= Özdemiroğlu Osman Pasha =

Grand Vizier of the Ottoman Empire from 1584 to 1585

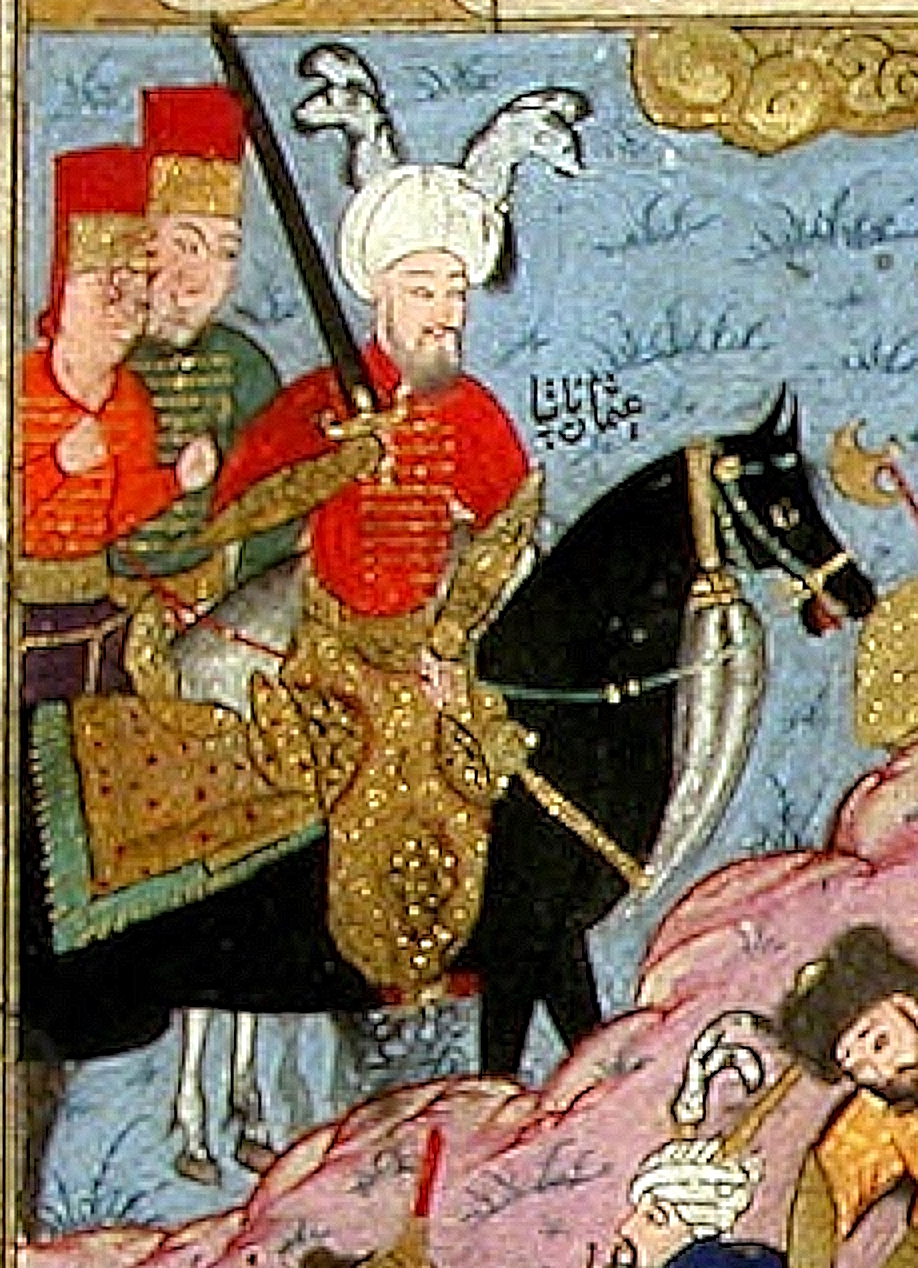
- Osman Pasha at the Siege of Shamakhi (1578). Şeca'atname (1586)

Grand Vizier of the Ottoman Empire
- In office 28 July 1584 – 29 October 1585
- Monarch: Murad III
- Preceded by: Kanijeli Siyavuş Pasha
- Succeeded by: Hadim Mesih Pasha

Governor General of Shirvan

Personal details
- Born: 1526 Cairo, Egypt Eyalet, Ottoman Empire
- Died: 29 October 1585 (aged 58–59) Tabriz, Safavid Iran
- Resting place: Diyarbakır, Turkey
- Spouse: Shamkhal's niece
- Relations: Özdemir Pasha (father)

Military service
- Allegiance: Ottoman Empire
- Branch/service: Ottoman Army; Ottoman Caucasus Navy
- Years of service: 1578–1585
- Rank: Serdar (field marshal)
- Battles/wars: Ottoman-Safavid War (1548-1549); Kemah; Ottoman-Ethiopian War (1557-1589); Battle of Enderta (1562); Yemen Campaign (1568-1570); Siege of Taiz (1569); Battle of Al-Qahira (1569); Battle of Ash-Shamayatayn; Ottoman–Safavid War (1578–1590); Battle of Çıldır; Siege of Tbilisi; Battle of Koyun Gecidi; Battle of Kanık Valley; Siege of Shamakhi (1578); Battle of Şah Oğlu; Battle of Torches; Battle of Alvar; Capture of Tabriz (1585); Battle of Şenbigazan; Ottoman-Kaitag Wars; Siege of Kala Koreysh; Battle of Rubas River; Ottoman-Küreli Wars; Battle of Kürkün; Crimean Khanate rebellion; Siege of Caffa (1584); Ottoman campaign in the North Caucasus; Battle of Sunzha River

Özdemiroğlu Osman Pasha (Turkish: Özdemiroğlu Osman Paşa) was a grand vizier of the Ottoman Empire (1584–1585) and a military commander who became celebrated in his country's history as the conqueror of the Caucasus (Turkish: Kafkas Fatihi).

Osman Pasha was the son of the Circassian Mamluk Özdemir Pasha (one of the Ottoman historians, Mustafa Selaniki, indicated that he was a Circassian from Dagestan) and a noble Arab woman. After the conquest of the Mamluk Sultanate by the Ottoman sultan Selim I in 1517, Osman's father, Özdemir, entered Ottoman service and distinguished himself in the campaign to conquer the Abyssinian Empire. Osman began his career at the age of 14 in Cairo, and following his father's death in 1560, he took his place as the beylerbey of Habesh Eyalet. His next place of service was Yemen, in the conquest of which his father had also participated. During the Yemeni campaign of 1568–1570, in the conflict between Koca Sinan Pasha and Lala Mustafa Pasha, Osman sided with the latter, which led to his disgrace and nearly cost him his life. In 1578, Lala Mustafa Pasha, who was appointed serdar of the Iranian expedition, took Osman Pasha with him, which became a turning point in his career. Osman Pasha played a pivotal role in the Ottoman victory on August 9, 1578, in the Battle of Çıldır and in September 1578 in the Battle of Koyun Gecidi on the Alazani River, and then volunteered to become the beylerbey of Shirvan. At the same time, he received the post of vizier. In 1583, by order of Murad III, Osman Pasha arrived in the Crimean Khanate to . On July 28, 1584, after executing the sultan's assignment, Osman Pasha was appointed grand vizier. After Özdemir Pasha subjected Dagestan, he ambushed and annihilated the Russians who intended to seize the army's treasury on the banks of the Terek River, He broke the ambush, and moved across the frozen rivers crossed the Koban River on the outskirts and reached kefe, to replace Khan Mehmed II Giray, who since 1579 had refused to send troops against the Safavids in Caucasus, with his brother İslâm II Giray. In 1585, he returned to the Transcaucasus and captured Tabriz, shortly after which he died.

Gelibolulu Mustafa Âlî praised Osman Pasha as "the greatest Ottoman pashazade (his father was also a pasha) and grand vizier."

== Biography ==
=== Origin and Early Years ===
After the Ottoman conquest of Egypt in 1517, representatives of the former Mamluk elite (Kipchaks and Circassians) recognized the supreme authority of the Ottoman sultan, joining the ranks of the military-bureaucratic apparatus of the Ottoman Empire. Among them was Özdemir Pasha, who for his merits received the nicknames "conqueror of Sanaa" (Turkish: San‘a fâtihi) and "subjugator of Abyssinia" (Turkish: Habeşistan Fatihi). By origin, Özdemir Pasha was a Circassian Mamluk (one of the Ottoman historians, Mustafa Selaniki, specified that he was a Circassian from Dagestan) and a relative of the last Mamluk sultan Qansuh al-Ghawri, while his wife came from the Abbasid dynasty. Their son, Osman, was born in 1527 in Egypt, where his childhood was also spent. He began his service from a young age; treasury records preserve entries regarding payments assigned to him starting from the age of 14. Initially, Osman held minor posts, receiving the rank of sanjakbey only in 1560. In the same year (or the previous one), his father, Özdemir Pasha, died, having captured a part of the Abyssinian Empire and thereby laying the foundation for Habesh Eyalet. Following Özdemir's death, the Ottomans were driven out of most of the territories he had captured; the Abyssinian army captured and destroyed Debarwa, which had previously been turned into a fortified city by Özdemir. Ottoman troops retreated to Massawa and Arkiko, holding onto them with difficulty. Everything changed when, in 1561, Osman Pasha was appointed to his father's former post as beylerbey in Habesh. By January 1562, Debarwa and its surroundings fell back under Ottoman control, and on April 20, 1562, exploiting the rivalries of local rulers, Osman defeated the Emperor of Ethiopia Minas at a locality called Enderte in the Tigray region (corresponding to the modern province of the same name). Within a short period, the new beylerbey subjugated all the lands previously captured by his father and expanded the eyalet's territory, establishing Ottoman rule in areas that had not been conquered before. Afterward, Osman Pasha erected a mosque with a tomb in Massawa in memory of his father, which Evliya Çelebi saw a century later. Osman returned to Cairo in August 1567 (though he remained the beylerbey of Habesh until January 16, 1568).

=== Yemen ===
Şehnāme-i Selīm hān (TSM, A. 3595)

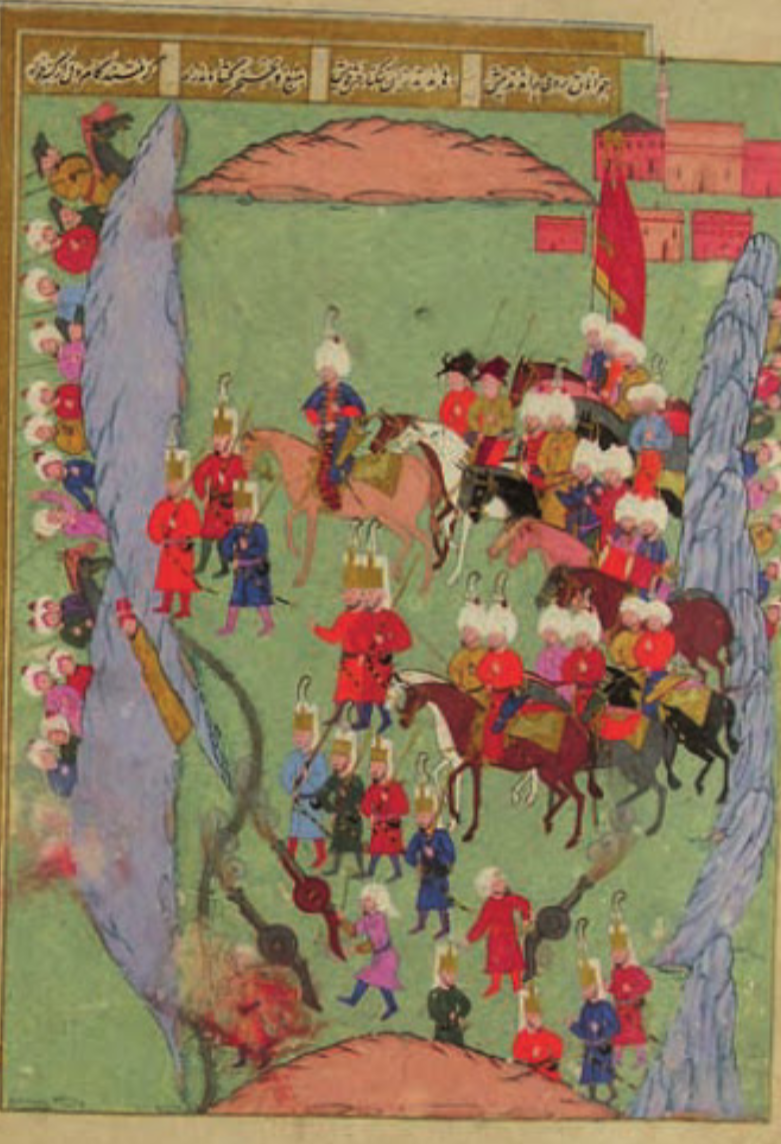
Özdemiroğlu Osman Pasha crosses the Shabaka Pass (Taiz). Şehnāme-i Selīm hān TSM, A. 3595, (Recto and verso fol. 75b)

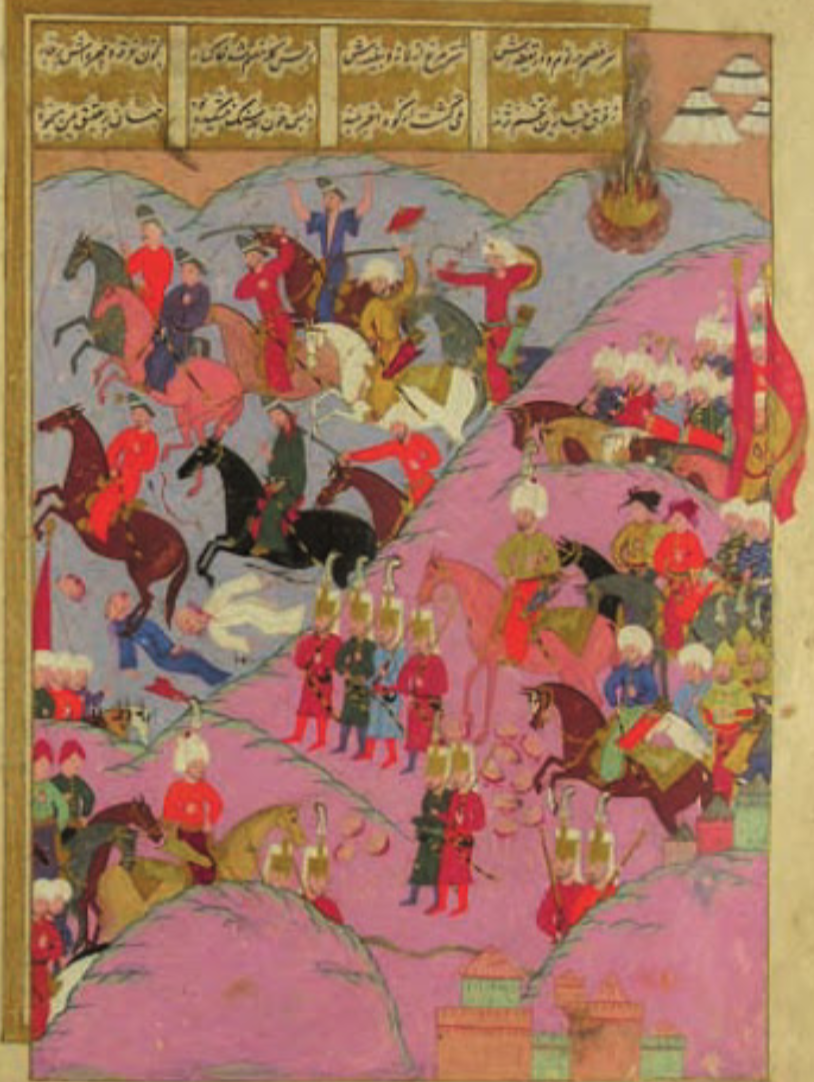
Battle of Osman Pasha with the enemy near Taiz during the Yemeni campaign (fol. 72b)

In 1567, news of the death of Sultan Suleiman I reached Yemen. The Zaidi Emir Al-Mutahhar decided that the time had come to shake off Ottoman rule and rose against them. The new sultan, Selim II, ordered the suppression of the rebellion and appointed Lala Mustafa Pasha as the serdar of the declared campaign.

In the winter of 1567/1568, Yemen was divided into two eyalets: Yemen and Sanaa. Osman was appointed beylerbey of Sanaa, while Murad Pasha became the beylerbey of Yemen. Murad Pasha was soon killed by the rebels, resulting in Osman Pasha taking charge of the unified eyalet. In mid-1568, Osman departed for his destination with a significant military contingent.

Meanwhile, the campaign of serdar Lala Mustafa against the Zaidis was delayed: the sultan ordered that the necessary forage, equipment, and provisions for the campaign be provided from the treasury of Egypt, which led to a conflict between Lala Mustafa and the beylerbey of Egypt, Koca Sinan Pasha. Both sent endless complaints and denunciations against each other to Istanbul. Lala Mustafa interpreted the instructions received from the divan as permitting him to take everything necessary for the campaign from the treasury in Cairo, but Sinan Pasha considered this an offensive violation of his rights. As a result, the dispatch of the army to Yemen was delayed for more than nine months. It is possible that the beylerbey of Yemen, Osman Pasha, and serdar Lala Mustafa Pasha, who were responsible for suppressing the Yemeni rebellion, delayed the expedition to cast a shadow on Koca Sinan Pasha, or perhaps Lala Mustafa was unwilling to risk his life and fortune in the Yemeni highlands. In any case, he claimed he lacked sufficient troops for a dangerous expedition against the Zaidis. Consequently, time was lost, and the positions of the rebels grew stronger. In his reports, Lala Mustafa accused Koca Sinan of withholding funds for the campaign, while Sinan accused Mustafa of delaying it. Furthermore, Koca Sinan Pasha accused Lala Mustafa of organizing a conspiracy: allegedly, Lala Mustafa Pasha intended to poison Sinan and hand Egypt over to his own son, Mehmed Bey, a maternal great-grandson of the last Mamluk sultan, Qansuh al-Ghawri. In this conflict, Grand Vizier Sokollu Mehmed Pasha, who was on hostile terms with Lala Mustafa, supported Koca Sinan Pasha, whereas Osman (also a relative of Qansuh al-Ghawri) sided with Lala Mustafa, thereby gaining one influential patron and two high-ranking adversaries.

Ultimately, in late 1568 or early 1569, Lala Mustafa Pasha was recalled to Istanbul and stripped of his posts as serdar and vizier, and the sultan appointed Sinan Pasha himself as the new serdar of the expedition. Having received information about the arrival of his adversary in Egypt, Osman Pasha prudently left for Yemen, and shortly thereafter, officials (chawushes) arrived in Cairo to investigate the events surrounding the delay of the campaign. According to an eyewitness of the events, the historian Gelibolulu Mustafa Âlî, they carried an order for the execution of Osman Pasha should they find him in Egypt. Sinan Pasha utilized the very supplies and troops he had previously denied to Lala Mustafa and set out for Yemen. The Ottoman army routed al-Mutahhar's forces near Taiz, after which the citadel of Taiz capitulated. After several months of skirmishes, advances, and retreats, al-Mutahhar sued for peace, and Sinan Pasha agreed, bringing the suppression of the rebellion to a close.

During the Yemeni campaign, Sinan Pasha attempted to eliminate Osman Pasha. He went so far as to commit forgery, issuing an order for Osman's execution on one of the blank forms bearing the sultan's tughra that he possessed as serdar. Osman Pasha managed to save himself only by fleeing Yemen via Mecca to Istanbul. However, another enemy awaited him in Istanbul—Grand Vizier Sokollu Mehmed Pasha, who refused to let Osman and his men into the capital. Some historians attribute this not to their confrontation, but to a plague epidemic in Istanbul. Osman allegedly lived in a tent outside the fortress wall near Topkapi due to quarantine. Sokollu supported Sinan Pasha's accusations and insisted that Osman Pasha deserved execution for disobedience. However, his friend and ally Lala Mustafa Pasha (who retained influence as the lala of Sultan Selim II) prevented his destruction. Ultimately, thanks to the intercession of his patron, Osman was appointed to the post of beylerbey of Al-Hasa in 1571, and after some time, on August 9, 1573, he was transferred to a similar position in Basra. In this position, he attempted to prevent the Portuguese from establishing themselves in the region by undertaking several raids into the Strait of Hormuz. On June 2, 1576, Osman was appointed to the post of beylerbey of Diyarbekir, without having managed to expel the Portuguese from the Persian Gulf, just as his father had previously driven them from the Red Sea.

=== Iranian Campaign ===
==== Beginning of the Campaign. From Kars to Tiflis ====
In 1576, Shah Tahmasp I died; his heirs squandered the accumulated wealth, and animosity between rival emirs fragmented the country and scattered its forces. Two years later, Sultan Murad III decided that the proper time had come to resume hostilities. Grand Vizier Sokollu Mustafa Pasha was opposed, but his influence had already weakened. In 1578, the Ottoman–Safavid War began, with Lala Mustafa Pasha appointed as serdar. On April 3, 1578, he called upon the beylerbey of Diyarbekir, Osman Pasha, to accompany him; Osman agreed and arrived at the army in Erzurum with a force of 1,000 men.

Before the start of combat operations, Lala Mustafa Pasha restored several fortresses in Kars and its surroundings, which was a clear violation of the Peace of Amasya of 1555. The campaign began in August (on the 9th or 7th) of 1578, when the army advanced eastward from Erzurum, followed by the capture of several small fortresses. On August 9, on the plain near Lake Çıldır, a battle took place, which Ibrahim Peçevi termed "great". The battle began when a 30,000-strong Persian army under the command of Imamquli Khan and Kara Khan clashed with the advanced detachments of the Ottoman army. At a critical moment, the beylerbey of Erzurum, Behram Pasha, and Osman Pasha—who, according to Peçevi, "displayed heroism"—managed to arrive to assist the vanguard. The hand-to-hand battle lasted until the following morning; due to heavy rain, neither side could utilize firearms. Ultimately, the Safavid forces were routed, and the Ottomans captured rich booty, with both sides suffering heavy losses. The crushing defeat of the Qizilbash was brought about by internal strife among the emirs, the defection of the Kurds to the Ottoman side, and the mistake of Tokhmaq Khan Ustajlu, who believed that the Ottoman army numbered no more than 40,000 men. When it became clear to him that he had engaged only the advanced detachments and that the main army was much larger, Tokmaq Khan began to retreat.

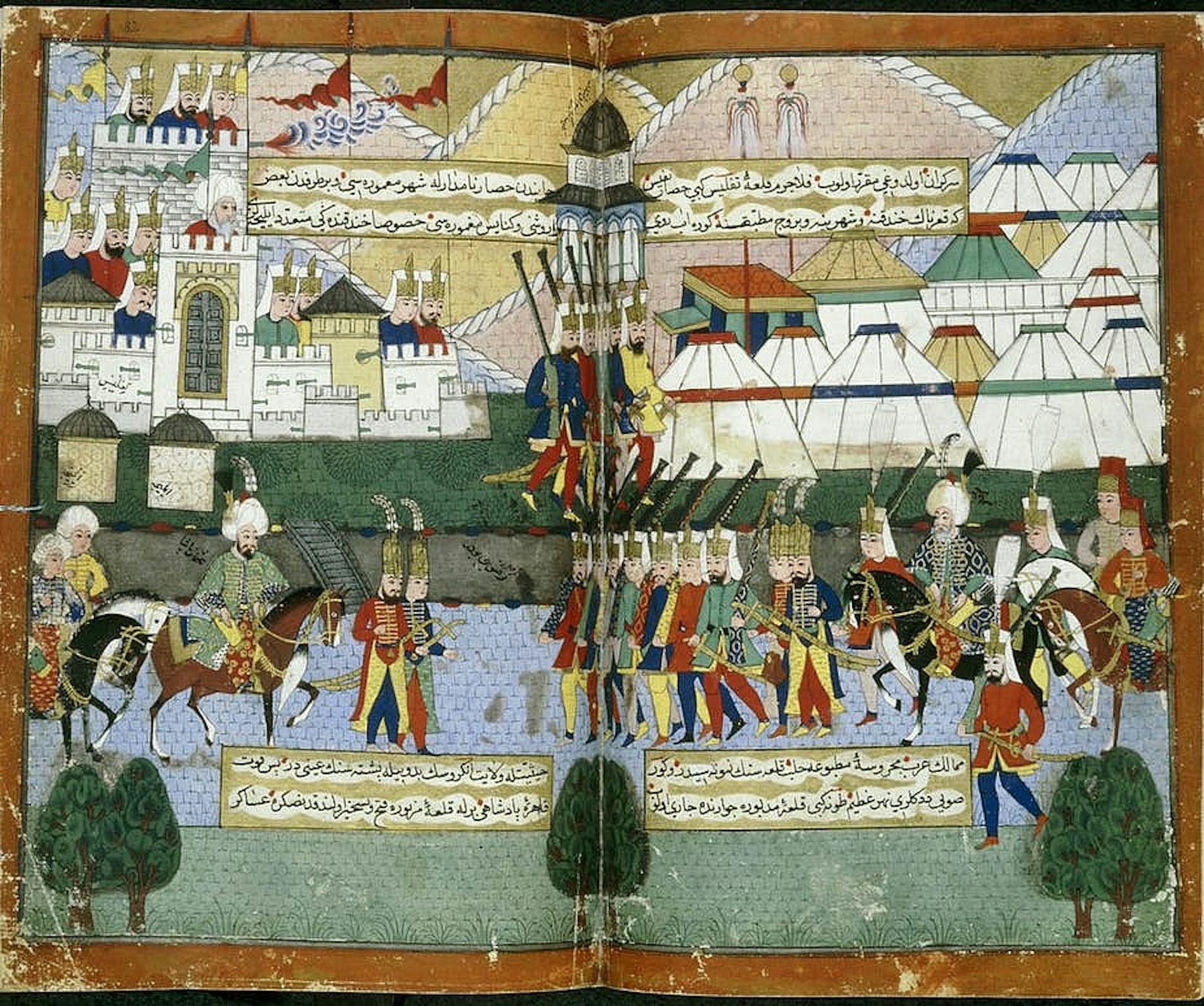
The Ottoman army enters Tiflis. Nusretname.

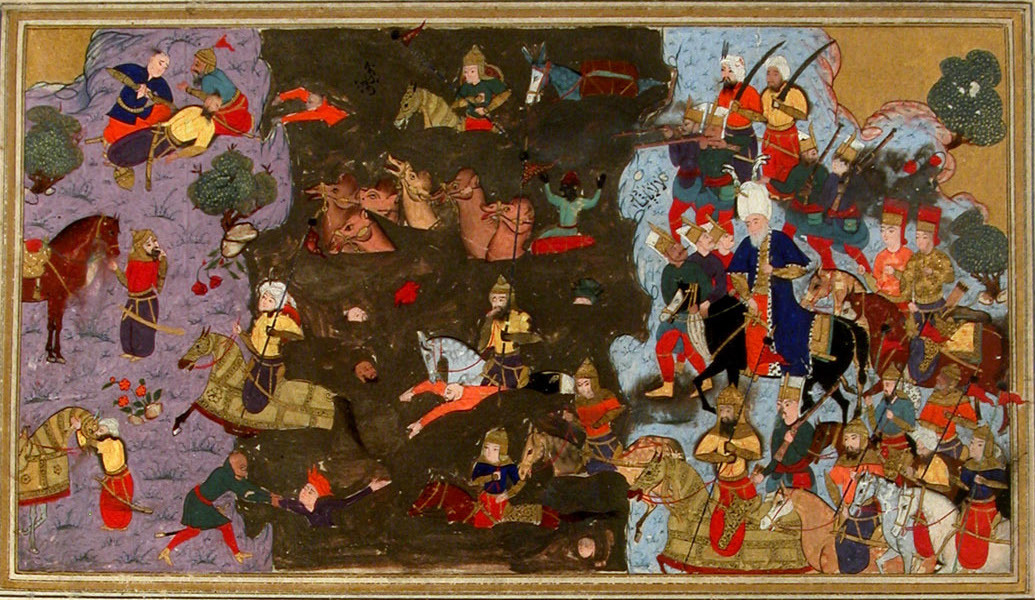
Battle on the Kanyk River. Şeca'atname (fol. 23), 1586

The victory at Çıldır opened the way to Georgia for the Ottoman troops. Despite the peace treaty of 1555, which divided Georgia into spheres of influence between the Ottoman Empire and the Safavid State, local rulers preferred to submit to the stronger side. After the battle of Çıldır, Manuchar and Qvarqvare IV Jaqeli of Samtskhe-Saatabago arrived to express submission to Mustafa Pasha. Prince Vakhtang Mukhranbatoni and Bardzim Amilakhvari (who ruled districts of the Kingdom of Kartli) entered into negotiations with the Ottomans and recognized themselves as vassals of the Ottoman sultan, and after the Ottomans took Tiflis, King Alexander of the Kingdom of Kakheti also arrived to meet Mustafa Pasha. He provided the Ottoman troops with provisions and took part in the fighting on the Ottoman side. Among the rulers of the Georgian states of that time, only the King of Kartli, Simon I the Great, refused to submit to the Ottomans and waged war against them.

The next battle between Ottoman and Safavid forces, in which Osman Pasha also distinguished himself, took place in September at the locality of Koyun Gecidi near the Kanyk River. Persian forces under the command of Amir Khan Turkman approached Aresh on the Kanyk River on September 9; later, many other Qizilbash emirs joined him, eventually gathering more than 20,000 warriors. On September 16, the Ottoman army also arrived at the Kanyk. The Persian beys decided to capture the Ottomans' pack animals; they crossed the Kura and attacked the advanced units of the Ottoman army at Koyun Gecidi. In response, an Ottoman detachment crossed a tributary of the Kura, the Gabyrry, and the Ottomans attacked from three sides simultaneously. One of the three detachments was commanded by Osman Pasha. The Qizilbash broke and fled, attempting to cross a bridge, but it could not bear the mass of people and collapsed. Those on the bridge drowned, while the rest either threw themselves into the water and consequently went to the bottom as well, or were cut down. The losses of the Persian army in this battle were immense—contemporaries estimated them at 15,000–20,000 men. A portion of the Qizilbash beys fell into Ottoman hands and were executed. The ruler of Shirvan, Aras Khan Rumlu, survived: he did not take part in the battle, having either arrived too late or failed to cross to the other bank with his army. Those who escaped the battle took refuge in the territory subject to him. This victory opened the way to Shirvan for the Ottoman troops.

In Aresh, Dervish Pasha (beylerbey of Diyarbekir and brother of Ferhad Pasha Sokolović) and Osman Pasha built a fortress within a week, "surrounded by a deep moat, with forts and towers, and warehouses for weaponry." One hundred cannons and a garrison under the command of Geytas Pasha were left in the fortress. The local Qizilbash population faced persecution from the Ottomans and local Sunnis. The day after the fortress was completed, the Ottoman army departed for Shirvan.

==== Shirvan ====
Shirvan marked a turning point in the career of Osman Pasha. Initially, Mustafa Pasha offered the post of beylerbey of Shirvan to Dervish Pasha, and following his refusal, to other beylerbeys, but they declined. To increase the attractiveness of the appointment, the serdar decided to raise the rank of whoever took the position and promised that he would add the title of vizier to the post of beylerbey of Shirvan. Following this, the beylerbey of Erzurum, Behram Pasha, agreed to remain in Shirvan, but changed his mind almost immediately, stating that "it is better to admit oneself defeated now than to be known as a traitor later." In such a situation, Mustafa Pasha was already considering that he might have to remain in Shirvan for the winter himself, but Osman Pasha saved the situation by offering his candidacy at the last moment. Thus, when Lala Mustafa Pasha led the army away for the winter to Erzurum, he left Osman Pasha in Shirvan with the rank of beylerbey, promoting him to the title of vizier and serdar. Ottoman garrisons were stationed in the fortresses, and Lala Mustafa promised to leave Osman Pasha, as beylerbey of Shirvan and Demir-kapi, a small force of 1,000 janissaries, more than 60 cannons, 200 chests of ammunition, and six months' pay for the soldiers, according to Peçevi (Mustafa Ali wrote of 66 cannons and 180 boxes of ammunition and weaponry). Also, before departing for Erzurum, Mustafa Pasha held negotiations with the rulers of the Avars, the Tabasarans, the Kaitags, Kumukh, and with Shahrukh Mirza of the Shirvanshah lineage, who promised to render Osman Pasha all possible assistance.

Şeca'atname, 1586

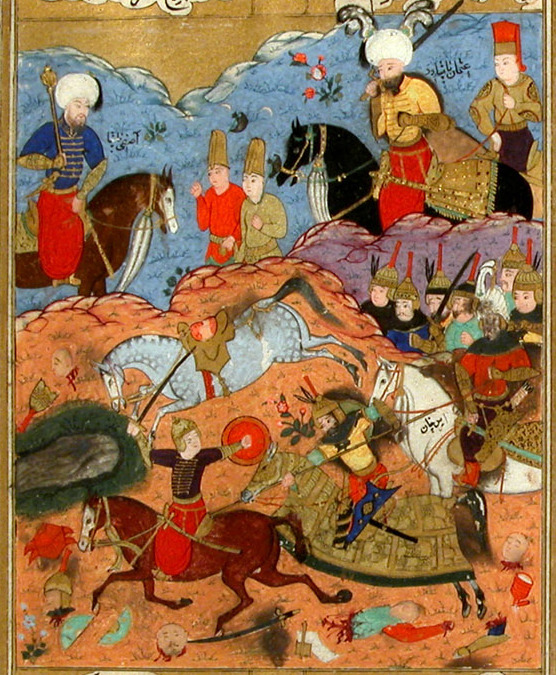
Osman Pasha (top right) and his secretary Asafi in battle against Aras Khan (fol. 57)

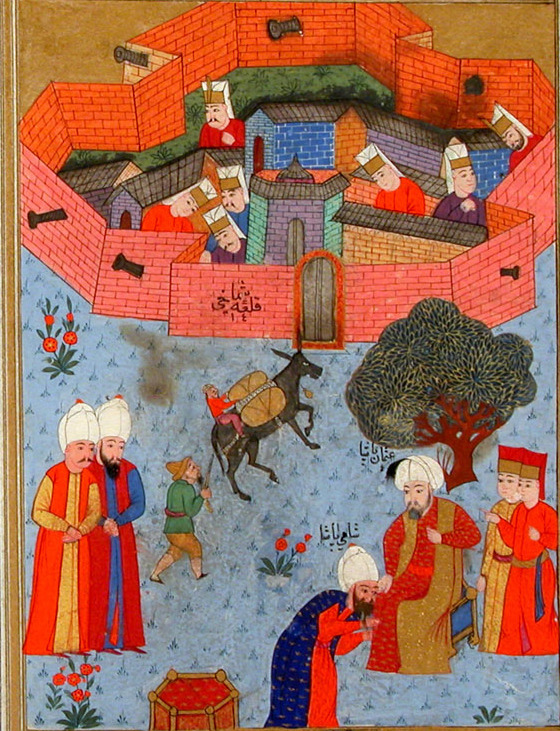
The fortress of Shamakha (fol. 183)

However, in the end, according to Harîmî İbrahim Çavuş, Mustafa "did not leave even 1/10th part of the amount of troops and treasury that had been promised" to Osman. Under conditions of resource scarcity, Osman Pasha decided that he had "no other choice but to fight until death, without lowering his dignity and his honor." To replenish supplies, he had to attack Portaloglu Ahmed, whose estates lay on the opposite bank of the Kura from Aresh. "Let the warriors of the victorious army test themselves in combat with the enemy and profit from his property," said Osman Pasha, according to Rahimizade. Over the Kabur River before Aresh, Özdemiroğlu Osman Pasha ordered the construction of a pontoon bridge in order to conduct a raid into Karabakh and Mugan. The ruler of Aresh, Geytas Pasha, by order of Osman Pasha, crossed the Kura over the bridge and attacked Portaloglu Ahmed. A portion of the Qizilbash warriors fled immediately; a battle ensued with the remaining ones, which was won by the Ottomans. Having captured trophies, Geytas Pasha returned to Osman Pasha, who had not crossed the bridge with his detachment but stood on his own bank, ready to intervene.

To establish himself firmly in Shirvan, Osman Pasha had to either subjugate, expel, or kill Aras Khan Rumlu, the Safavid beghlarbeg of Shirvan, who had managed to leave Shamakha before the arrival of the Ottoman army and was waiting on the other bank of the Kura. When an Ottoman detachment numbering about 250 men attacked Aras Khan, he defeated it, with both sides suffering perceptible losses. Osman Pasha learned of the defeat and arrived from Aresh to personally engage Aras Khan. The Qizilbash resorted to a favorite practice—they devastated the territory to deprive the enemy of the opportunity to replenish food supplies during the march. Realizing that without sustenance his army would be unable to fight, Osman Pasha took refuge in Shamakha and postponed the conquest of Shirvan, especially since he received news that reinforcements—the army of the Crimean Khanate—were on the way. Osman planned to wait for the Tatars and attack Aras Khan from two sides simultaneously, but the latter unexpectedly attacked first and surrounded the city. The size of the Qizilbash army was estimated differently. Rahimizade cited a figure of 20,000 men, while Peçevi cited 25,000.

According to Mustafa Selaniki, the battle for Shamakha began on November 17, 1578, while Peçevi indicated an earlier date—November 9. The battle continued all day, and only with darkness did both sides cease fighting. Simultaneously with Aras Khan's attack on Shamakha, Imamquli Khan and Geylani Amir Khan with 10,000–15,000 warriors crossed the Kura and attacked Aresh. In the evening, Osman Pasha received a message about this attack, when a messenger arrived from Geytas Pasha requesting aid. Osman Pasha sent about a thousand warriors to assist Geytas (according to Rahimizade and Bekir Kütükoğlu), who arrived in the midst of the battle. Both battles (at Shamakha and at Aresh) resumed in the morning and lasted the entire day. At Aresh, the Ottomans suffered a defeat, the cause of which Rahimizade considered to be the inexperience and unskillfulness of Geytas, but Imamquli Khan achieved victory thanks to his military talent. He understood that the Ottoman artillery on the walls of Aresh was dangerous for attackers and gave the Ottomans an advantage, so the commander, feigning flight, lured Geytas Pasha into the field far away from the cannons. Geytas Pasha, with a small detachment of approximately 250 men, rushed to pursue the "retreating" enemy, found himself surrounded, and died in battle. Almost all of his warriors either fell in battle or were killed by local inhabitants. News of the destruction of Geytas Pasha and the capture of Aresh by the Qizilbash reached Osman Pasha on the second day of the battle for Shamakha. He made the decision to conceal the sad news from his subordinates so as not to demoralize them. On the right flank of the Ottoman army fought the Dagestani Shamkhal and the bey of Sanjar, Budag; on the left flank was the atalyk of Adil Giray, Mehmed Bey, who had arrived ahead of his charge, and alongside him fought the Georgian vassals of the Ottomans (for example, Alexander), the rulers of Agdash and Sadarak. After capturing Aresh, Imamquli Khan arrived at Shamakha with his army to assist Aras Khan. The Qizilbash were gaining the upper hand in the battle, but on the morning of the third day, Tuesday, November 11, the Tatars under the command of Adil Giray arrived to assist Osman. This altered the situation; the 15,000 fresh warriors brought by him saved the Ottomans and routed the Safavid warriors who were exhausted by the battle. Aras Khan fought courageously but was taken prisoner along with his son, Dede Khan, and both were executed. Along with them, Osman Pasha executed many other captured Safavid beys. Among those executed, Rahimizade named Imamquli Khan, whereas Selaniki wrote that the khan drowned while fleeing. However, these are erroneous statements, since Imamquli Khan participated in the Battle of the Torches and in the battles for Tabriz 5 years later. The losses of the Qizilbash were immense. According to Rahimizade, only a thousand men from the entire army managed to save themselves. Kütükoğlu wrote that on the Qizilbash side there were 8,000 dead and 8,000 wounded and missing, and the few survivors among them took refuge in the mountains.

==== Winter of 1578–1579. Capture of Adil Giray ====
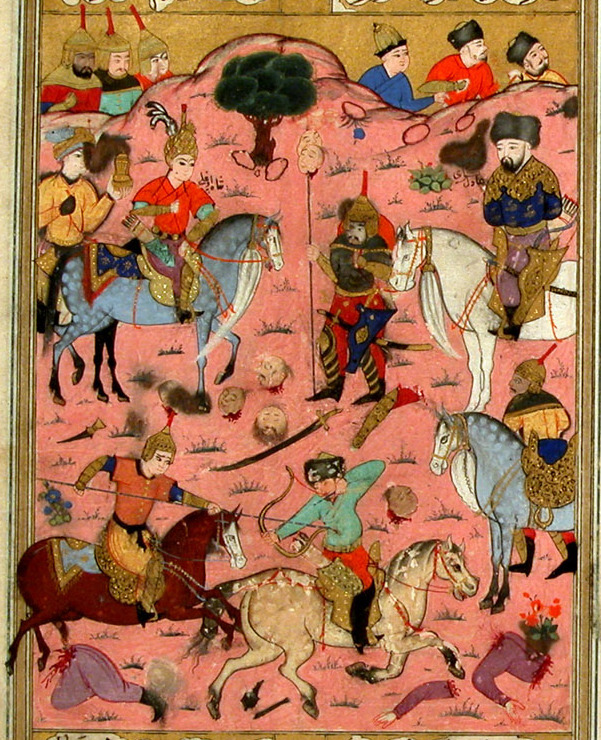
Adil Giray surrenders to Hamza Mirza. Şeca'atname (fol. 76), 1586

After the capture of Shirvan, the Shah's government dispatched envoys to Murad III, offering the sultan peace on behalf of the Shah under the terms of the Amasya treaty. This embassy met with no success, and the Safavids assembled an 80,000-strong army, at the head of which stood the heir to the throne, Hamza Mirza (a minor according to Peçevi, 8 years old according to Rahimizade), though actual command was held by the vizier Mirza Salman Jaberi. Ottoman sources estimate the size of the enemy army that approached Shamakha on November 26, 1578, at 50,000–100,000 men. Hamza Mirza besieged the city for three days. Even before the siege began, Adil Giray and the sanjakbey of Aresh, Piyale Bey, left Shamakha, having decided to plunder Aras Khan's camp located on the other bank of the Kura. On November 28, 1578, they suddenly attacked it and captured an immense number of trophies. Peçevi asserted that this attack took place by order of Osman Pasha. In the words of the historian: "The treasury of Eresh Khan, 70 of his beautiful daughters and wives, and about 50 of his beautiful concubines were captured; his young son was also seized there". Osman Pasha sent a letter to Adil Giray, requesting him to abandon the booty and urgently arrive in Shamakha, but the messenger was intercepted, and Mirza Salman made the decision to set out to meet the Tatars. On November 28, 1578, near the Aksu River at the locality of Mollahasan, Adil Giray clashed with Mirza Salman at the head of a 20,000-strong army. The careless Adil Giray, who was indulging in amusements and entertainment, "blinded by the beauty of his captives", failed to organize a defense. Although the Crimean prince himself "rushed into battle like an enraged lion," the Tatars were routed, and Adil Giray himself and Piyale Bey fell into captivity. The Ottoman troops were in a dejected state, so Osman Pasha concealed the news of the Tatars' defeat and announced their victory instead. To add credibility to the tale, he ordered cannons to be fired, but the truth came out, and soldiers began to desert en masse. The Qizilbash army from Shamakha headed for Aresh. After killing the Ottoman commanders and burning the Aresh fortress, the Safavid army returned to Karabakh.

In the winter of 1578–1579, Osman Pasha had to abandon Shamakha and retreat to Demir-kapi, as he realized he could not withstand the attacks of the Persian army with his small force. Demir-kapi attracted the Ottomans not only because of its impregnable fortress but also because they counted on the support of the local Sunni population, as well as the Dagestani rulers, particularly the Shamkhal. This winter was very severe, and the army's path was arduous. According to Rahimizade:

"There were such severe frosts as had not been seen since the time of the flood of Nuh. From the cold, some suffered frostbite in their feet, others in their hands, and most of the unfortunate warriors in their noses and ears. From the sufferings that fell to the lot of [the Ottomans], as well as from the harsh winter, as many people departed for the next world as had not perished during the entire time from the beginning of the eastern campaign to the present moment. Those who were still able to move on their own covered this path in 7-8 days, while the rest, completely exhausted, reached Demirkapy within 12 days".

The inhabitants of the city, upon learning of the Ottoman defeats, drove out their garrison, and the arriving Osman Pasha had to use "at times excessive flattery, at times frantic violence" to enter the fortress. Osman Pasha executed those among the population who were "disobedient and rebellious." The frosts did not abate, people starved, unburied bodies of those who froze and died of hunger lay in the streets, and barley and bread cost enormous amounts of money. There were no funds to pay the warriors, and Osman Pasha "cut money out of leather and put it into circulation." The warriors who survived this campaign surrendered this leather money upon their return and exchanged it in the treasury for real currency. A century later, Evliya Çelebi wrote that in the treasury of the local beys of Kabarda, many of these leather akçe coins were preserved, stamped with "Sultan Murad son of Selim Khan, conqueror of Shamakha, year 986 [1578-79]".

In the opinion of Sharaf Khan Bidlisi, Hamza Mirza's mother, through lack of foresight, did not make efforts to dislodge the Ottomans from Demir-kapi and returned to Qazvin, taking the captured Adil Giray with her. Osman Pasha, entrenched in the city, although cut off from his main forces, continued to harass the Qizilbash with raids; he was aided in this by the Dagestanis and the insurgent forces of the heir to the Shirvanshahs, Abu Bakr Mirza. Demir-kapi remained the only city in Shirvan where a Turkish garrison held out along with Osman Pasha himself.

==== 1579–1581 ====
The Persian Shah Mohammad Khodabanda sent a letter to Mehmed II Giray, promising to release Adil Giray in exchange for an alliance, but the Crimean khan forwarded this letter to the sultan. In response, the sultan called upon Muhammad Giray to avenge Adil Giray, who by then had already been killed, and to march with an army to assist Osman Pasha. On July 26, 1579, the khan set out on the campaign. Ahead, Mehmed Giray sent the sanjakbey of Azak, Mahmud Bey, who was well acquainted with Circassian, Russian, and Georgian lands. With 10,000 warriors, Mahmud Bey reached Demir-kapi in 74 days, while Mehmed Giray himself arrived with the army later, in October 1579. Rahimizade estimated the total number of the Tatar host at 80,000 men, while Peçevi placed it at 40,000–50,000 men. The Ottoman troops were exhausted by the construction of the citadel in Kars and constant skirmishes with the enemy. In view of this, as well as the approaching winter, the march to the south had to be postponed, and the Tatars attacked Shirvan. Having received a report about the arrival of the Crimean horde, Mirza Salman set out from Tabriz to meet the Ottomans at the head of an army of emirs. However, they did not arrive in time, and the emir of Shirvan, Muhammad Khalifa, engaged in an unequal battle with only his own forces, preferring death in combat to shameful flight. Ottoman sources do not even mention this clash, which is known only from Persian sources. Having plundered Shirvan, Karabakh, and Ganja, the Tatars captured large booty and 20,000–30,000 captives. The khan returned to Crimea, leaving Ğazı Giray in his stead, at the same time securing himself against the latter's presence in Kefe. With the help of 4,000–5,000 Tatar soldiers under Ğazı Giray, Osman Pasha attacked Baku and captured it. In Baku, he engaged in managing the oil fields and repairing the castle. After Mehmed Giray's departure, Osman Pasha, along with Ğazı Giray's detachment, marched from Demir-kapi against a combined force of local Kaitak, Kumyk, Tabasaran, and Kipchak tribes that were constantly attacking the Ottomans. A battle took place in a gorge near Kür Küre bogazy (in Kiurin district). A thousand warriors of Ğazı Giray began the fight, and then the Ottoman detachment and artillery entered the engagement. According to Rahimizade, the Ottoman losses amounted to 200 men killed, while thousands of men died on the side of their opponents, as Osman Pasha's troops destroyed 60–70 villages.

Perhaps this same campaign is described in other sources as a confrontation with Mirza Salman. Mirza Salman conducted a raid with the aim of dislodging Osman Pasha from Baku but was defeated and fled, wounded himself, on an unsaddled horse. According to rumors, only 300 enemy soldiers managed to survive this raid. The date of this event is unknown; according to A. Şeref, the divan documents allow this event to be assigned to the beginning of 1581. For this campaign, the Ottoman sultan rewarded Ğazı Giray with a "bonus" of 50,000 akçe.

In the essence of 1581 (H. İnalcık dated the event to 1580), Ğazı Giray was taken prisoner by the Qizilbash. He refused to cooperate with them against the Ottomans and was imprisoned in the Alamut Castle.

==== Negotiations ====
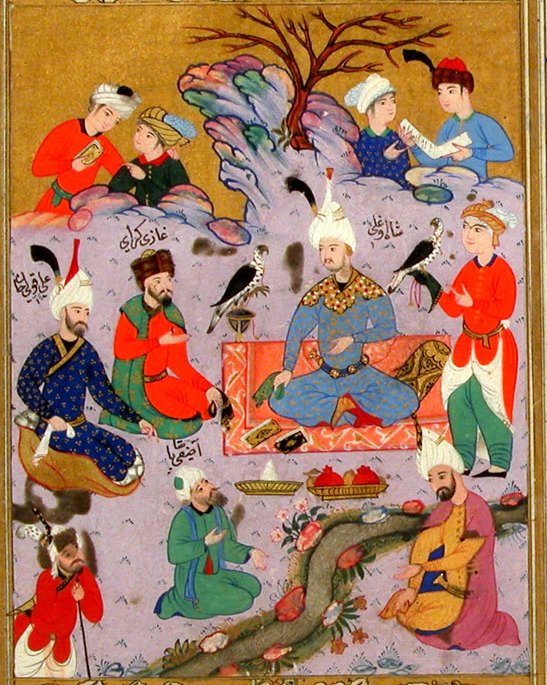
Ğazı Giray in captivity. Şeca'atname (fol. 246), 1586

When Murad learned of the situation in the Caucasus—about the capture of Shirvan by the Qizilbash, the retreat of Osman Pasha to Demir-Kapi, and the capture of Adil Giray—he angrily dismissed Mustafa Pasha from the post of serdar and recalled him to Istanbul, appointing his rival Koca Sinan Pasha as serdar. In August, Sinan Pasha was appointed to the post of grand vizier; the news of this reached him on his way to the east. Sinan Pasha arrived in Tiflis, but he was in a hurry to return to Istanbul, and therefore initiated a correspondence with the Shah, suggesting the start of negotiations. An ambassador, Ibrahim Khan Turkman, was sent from Persia to the sultan with gifts. Osman Pasha continued to hold Demir-kapi and Baku, so a truce on the old terms was not part of Sultan Murad III's plans. Moreover, the sultan learned that the initiative for negotiations came not from the Shah, but from Sinan Pasha. Growing angry, on December 6, 1582, he dismissed Sinan Pasha from the post of grand vizier and serdar, and placed Ibrahim Bey in prison.

==== Battle of Torches ====
Osman Pasha's position in Demir-kapi was difficult; on October 4, the English merchant Christopher Barrow observed how the long-awaited treasury was brought to Osman Pasha. According to the Englishman, the pasha was in great need of money, and the soldiers were ready to mutiny because they had not been paid for their service for a long time. In 1582, Imamquli Khan, with a 50,000-strong army as well as the joined beys of Georgia and Dagestan, marched to recapture Shamakha. Following a report sent to Istanbul by Osman Pasha describing the situation, a decision was made in the divan to send the army of Rumelia under the command of the sanjakbey of Silistra, Yakub Bey, through the Crimea to Derbent. He was ordered to arrive in Kefe within three days, and once in Kefe, the command of the expedition was assumed by the beylerbey of Kefe, Cafer Pasha. The army arrived in Derbent on November 14, 1582, after making an eighty-day march. Thus, the size of the Ottoman army increased significantly, after which Osman Pasha, accompanied by Yakub Bey, set out on a campaign with the aim of expelling the Safavids from the eastern Caucasus. In April 1583, in a battle against a 6,000-strong detachment of the Persian army, Yakub Bey received a mortal wound and died. Upon learning of Yakub Bey's death, Osman Pasha gathered the warriors from Silistra; he managed to raise their fighting spirit and convince them to avenge their commander, despite the fact that they had not been paid for a long time. After this, Osman Pasha, with the army of Rumelia, marched out of Demirkapi to meet the enemy. In the ensuing battle, which was called the "Battle of Torches" by the Ottomans and lasted three days and three nights, Osman Pasha achieved one of his greatest victories, which allowed him to establish himself in Shirvan. After the battle, Osman Pasha gave the army three days to rest and then led them to Shamakha, where earlier (May 6, 1583) the construction of a fortress had begun. Following the completion of the construction, which lasted 40 days, Osman Pasha accepted expressions of submission from Georgian and Dagestani rulers and departed for Demirkapi. Historians of that period connect the successes of the Ottomans in subjugating the Transcaucasus with the activities of Osman Pasha.

=== Change of Khan in Crimea ===
Even at the beginning of the campaign, the sultan had commanded Mehmed II Giray to arrive in the Caucasus to assist Osman Pasha with the Tatar cavalry, but the khan was so fat that he could not even ride a horse; he was carried in a cart, so the march to the Caucasus seemed very difficult to him. The khan's brothers and his son set out for the Caucasus with the Tatar force, while Mehmed himself moved toward Osman Pasha only after repeated orders from Istanbul. Furthermore, he did not remain for the winter in Shirvan but, contrary to the sultan's orders, returned to Crimea. From 1579, the khan refused to send troops against the Persians in the Caucasus. In 1582, when the army of Rumelia was moving through Crimea to the Caucasus, Mehmed Giray refused to set out on the campaign together with Cafer Pasha. In the summer of 1583, the recently appointed beylerbey of Rumelia and serdar, Ferhad Pasha, arrived in the Caucasus, and Osman Pasha received an order from Murad III to leave the Caucasus and punish the disobedient Mehmed II Giray. However, the main part of the Ottoman army was already on the march to Erzurum, so only 3,000 men remained at Osman Pasha's disposal. At this time, the treasury sent from Istanbul arrived, and Osman Pasha was able to pay the soldiers. On October 21, 1583, Osman Pasha handed over affairs to Cafer Pasha and departed for Crimea. The journey to Kefe was difficult; along the way from Beştepe, there was nowhere to replenish supplies of water, food, and forage. A very frosty winter set in early; in the words of Peçevi, "700–800 riding and pack animals perished daily," and the Ottoman troops crossed the Kuban River and the Kerch Strait on ice. Finally, after an arduous journey from Demir-kapi, Osman Pasha reached Kefe, where Osman Pasha presented the sultan's demands to Mehmed Giray. In response, Mehmed Giray declared to Osman Pasha that he was a "padishah, master of the khutbah and coin" (the khutbah and minting of coins were considered the rights of an independent ruler), and that no one had the right to depose him, and then besieged Osman Pasha in Kefe with a forty-thousand-strong army. Osman Pasha's position would have been hopeless if there had been unity within the Giray family. But Alp Giray, Mehmed's brother, was dissatisfied that after Adil Giray's death, Mehmed wanted to appoint his own son, Saadet II Giray, as kalga instead of Alp Giray, by seniority. Alp Giray made his way into the city besieged by his brother, and Osman Pasha resorted to a ruse—he declared Mehmed deposed and proclaimed Alp Giray as khan to divide the Tatars. Nevertheless, Mehmed continued to besiege Kefe, and local clashes between Mehmed's supporters and Ottoman warriors took place near the city walls.

The sultan approved the policy of dividing the Tatars chosen by Osman Pasha; however, instead of Alp Giray, another brother of Mehmed—Islam Giray, who had lived at the sultan's court since the time of Suleiman I and had eventually retired to a dervish monastery in Bursa, was sent from Istanbul to Kefe. The Ottoman nominee was accompanied by a squadron under the command of the celebrated admiral Uluç Ali Reis. As soon as the squadron arrived in Kefe, Mehmed Giray's supporters grew agitated, leading to a mass departure of warriors from him. Unable to stop the defectors, the deposed khan fled, attempting to reach the Nogais, but failed to do so in time because of his weight. The slowly moving cart was overtaken in Kanlycak by Alp Giray, who ordered Mehmed to be strangled. Having thus executed Murad's order, Osman Pasha returned to Istanbul on June 30, 1584, along with Uluç Ali's fleet.

Miniatures from the Şeca'atname (1586) dedicated to the campaign in Crimea

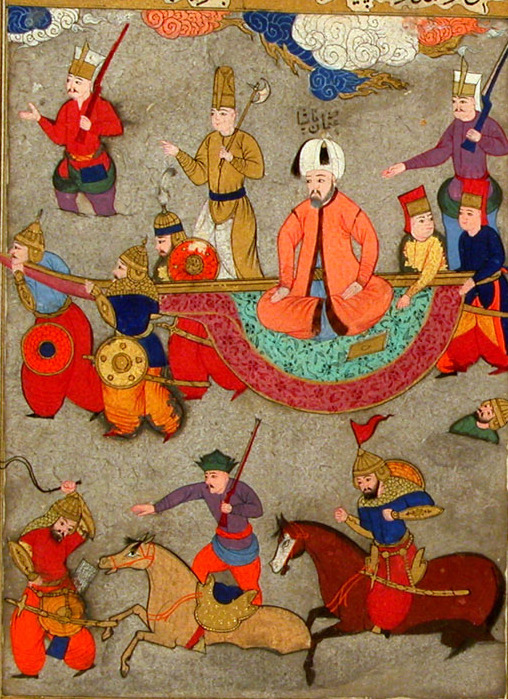
Osman Pasha is carried through snowdrifts on a litter (fol. 196)

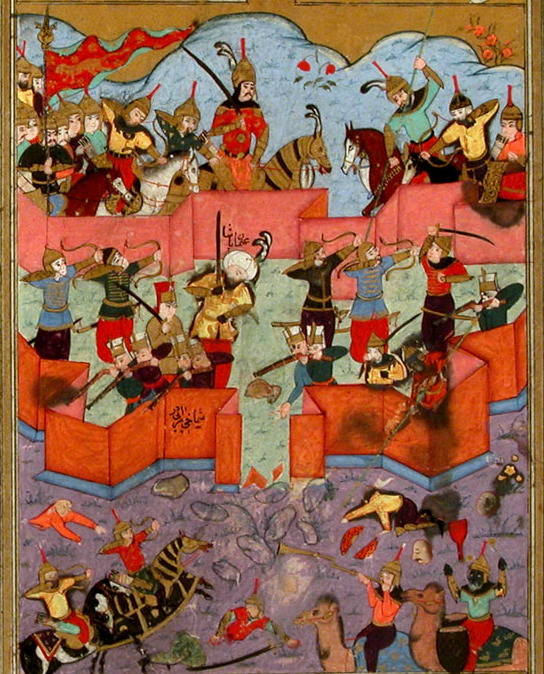
Osman Pasha under siege (fol. 72)

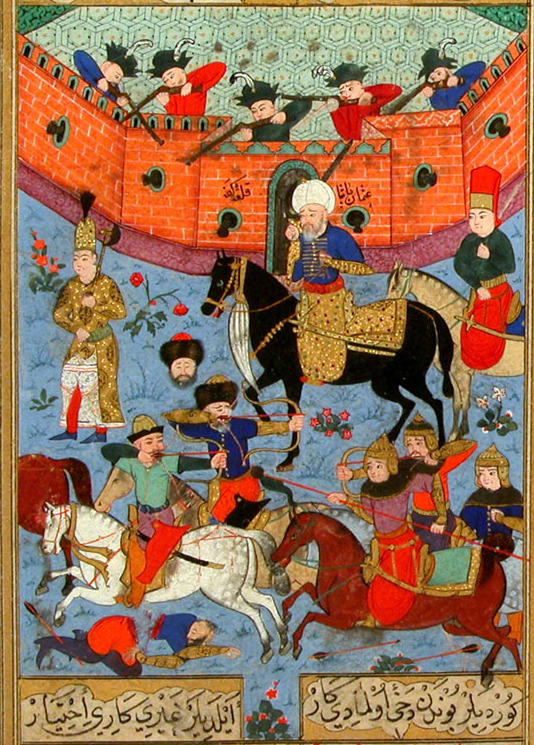
Defeat of Mehmed Giray during the siege of Kefe (fol. 213)

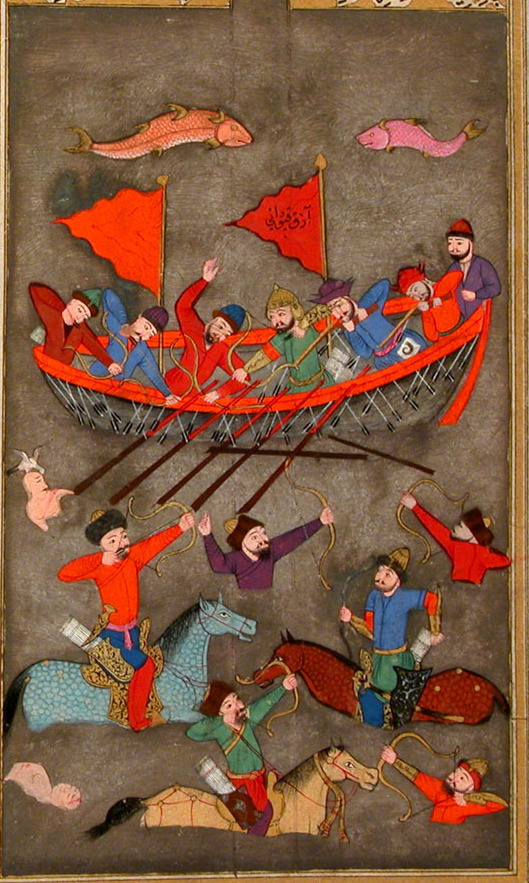
The Ottoman fleet in Crimea (fol. 215)

=== Grand Vizier ===
According to sources, the people welcomed Osman Pasha as a victorious commander and hero. Nevertheless, the Ottoman historian and contemporary of the events, Selaniki Mustafa, wrote that some viziers in conspiracy with Grand Vizier Siyavuş Pasha attempted to discredit him. But despite the rumors spread by rivals that Osman consumed drugs and alcohol, Murad received Osman Pasha, listened to his report, and praised him, and on July 28, 1584, the sultan appointed him grand vizier in place of Siyavuş Pasha.

Shortly thereafter, Saadet II Giray, the son of Mehmed Giray, appeared in Crimea with forces of Nogais and Don Cossacks and drove İslam Giray out of Bakhchisaray. The Ottoman nominee, who fled to Kefe, appealed to the sultan for help, and just two months after being appointed grand vizier, Osman Pasha was instructed to end the struggle between the khans in Crimea. On October 15, 1584, the last meeting of the council took place; having secured the sultan's approval of his plans at it, Osman Pasha headed to Üsküdar on October 16 to prepare for a new stage of the war in the Caucasus and to settle the Crimean problem. Osman Pasha supervised the loading and dispatch of ammunition and equipment, and on November 3 set out for Anatolia to winter in Kastamonu. From there, Osman sent the beylerbey of Bosnia, Ferhad Pasha Sokolović, to Crimea from the port of Sinop. Osman himself spent the winter in Kastamonu. When the question of Crimea was settled, Murad sent him to Iran; on March 15, 1585, an order appointing him serdar in the Caucasus caught up with him. Ibrahim Peçevi wrote: "Year 992 (1584). The Padishah appointed Vizier Osman Pasha as serdar and told him: 'Having someone like you, it is incongruous to send someone else as serdar to Iran'".

=== Capture of Tabriz ===
Miniatures from the Şeca'atname (1586) dedicated to the campaign in Tabriz

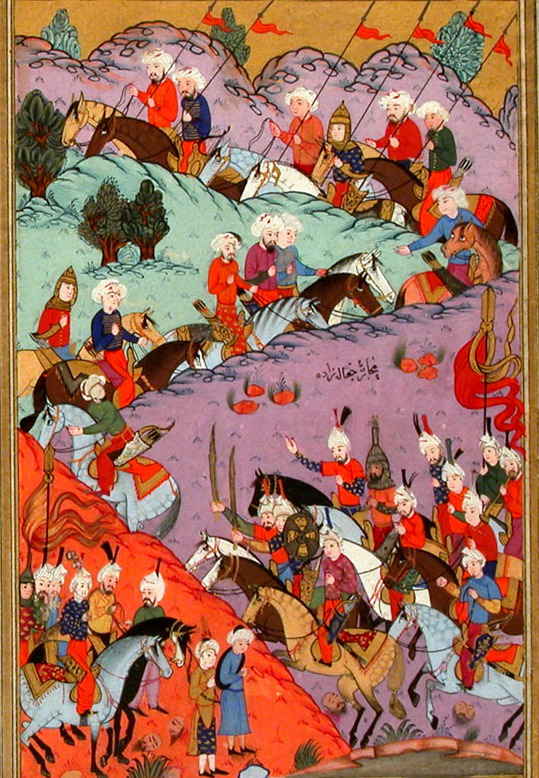
The Qizilbash pursue the Ottomans near Tabriz (fol. 270)

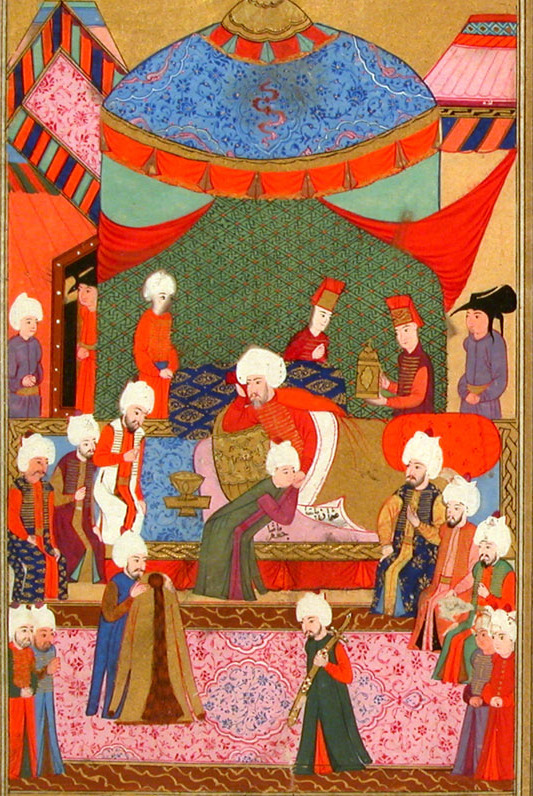
The sick Osman Pasha during the campaign in Iran (fol. 279)

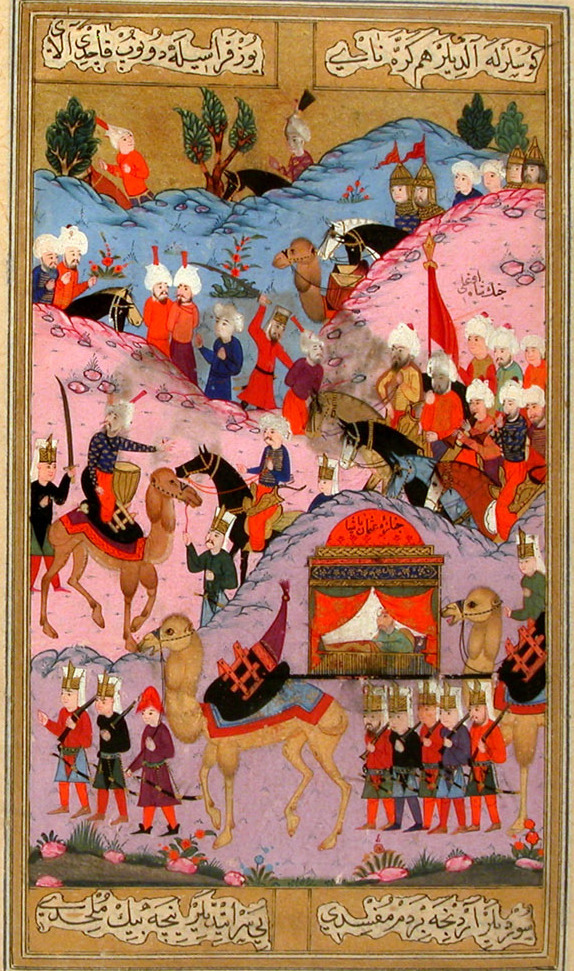
The deceased Osman Pasha is carried in a palanquin as if alive (fol. 282)

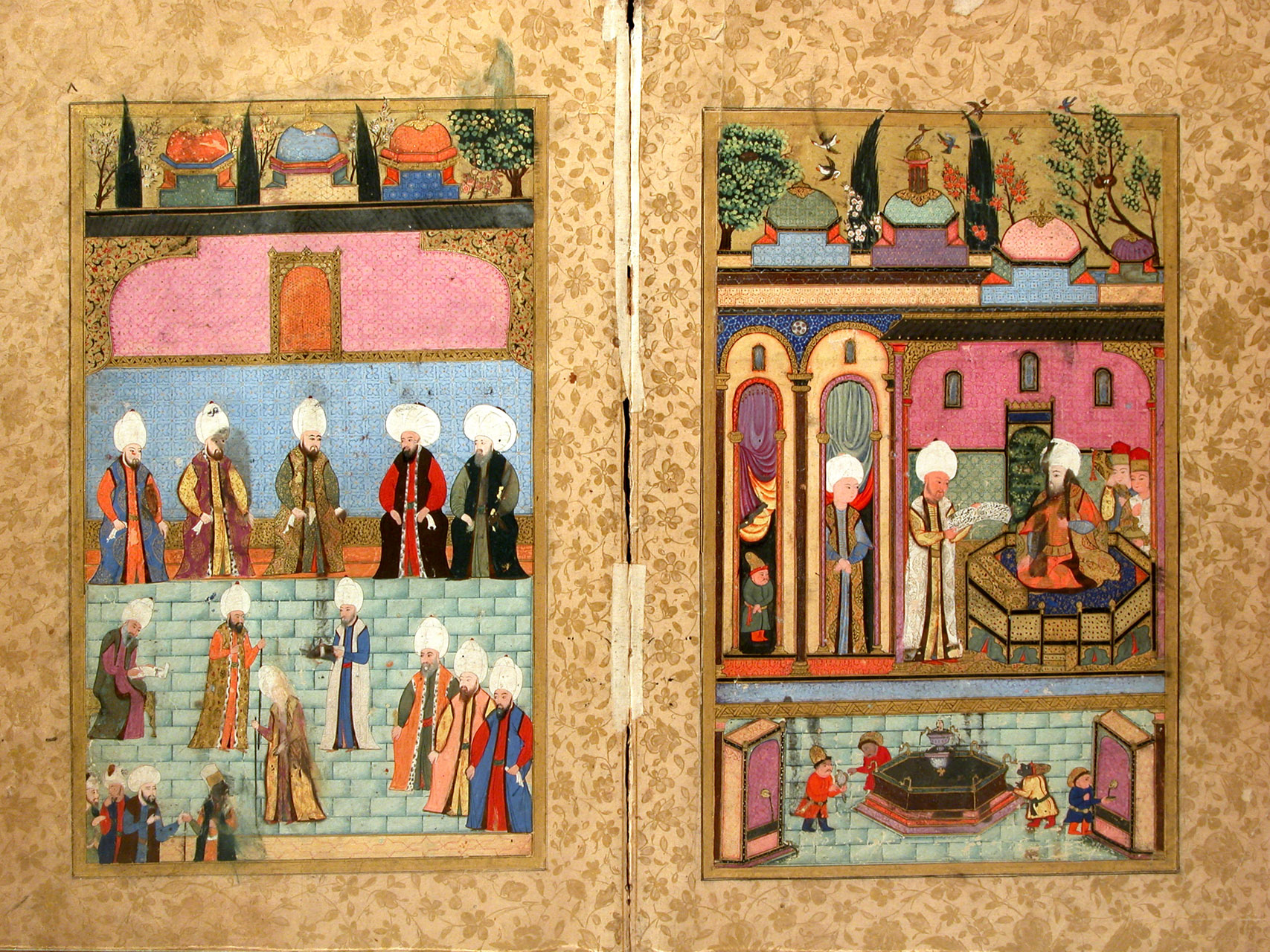
Murad appoints Osman Pasha as grand vizier (fol. 8)

On April 4, having completed preparations for the march, Osman Pasha set out for the east, to Amasya, where he met with Ferhad Pasha. Along the way, Osman Pasha made long stops. He stayed in Amasya for 22 days, then in Tokat for 20 days. He then arrived in Sivas, where he was joined by the beylerbey of Anatolia, Hasan Pasha, with a 40,000-strong army, and the beylerbey of Karaman, Murad Pasha. Osman Pasha arrived in Erzurum on August 2 and stayed in the city for 10 days. The reasons for such long stops are unknown; perhaps he was awaiting additional troops, or perhaps it was due to Osman's illness. Allegedly, he was so sick that he could not ride a horse, and from Erzurum he was carried in a palanquin. Oruç Bey Bayat wrote that there were between 230,000 and 300,000 men in the army, 50,000 of whom Osman Pasha decided to disband as inexperienced. As the army advanced, more and more troops joined it. In September 1585, the army was in Chaldiran, where it was joined by the beylerbey of Van, Cigalazade Yusuf Sinan Pasha, along with Kurdish emirs. Here Osman Pasha altered his plans. If in Erzurum he had intended to go to Nakhchivan, in Chaldiran he received confirmation from Ğazı Giray, who had escaped from captivity, that both the Shah and Hamza Mirza were absent from Tabriz. In connection with this, Tabriz proved to be a more interesting target, and the army advanced in its direction. Along the way, the Ottoman army destroyed several settlements, either killing or taking captive their population. Already near Tabriz, Osman Pasha learned that a Persian army led by Hamza Mirza was approaching. According to O. A. Efendiyev, Hamza Mirza's forces numbered no more than 20,000 men, while Selaniki cited a figure of 30,000.

In the ensuing battle, the vanguard of the Ottoman army was commanded by Cigalazade Sinan Pasha; on the right wing stood the troops of the beylerbeys of Anatolia, Sivas, and Egypt; on the left flank were the beylerbeys of Rumelia, Karaman, and Aleppo; and in the rear guard Osman Pasha placed the troops of Erzurum and Maras. The Ottoman army outnumbered the enemy's forces, but in the battle, which lasted two days, both sides suffered heavy losses. Rahimizade wrote that in the event of pursuing the retreating Qizilbash, the Ottomans would have achieved a complete victory, but according to Peçevi, the Ottoman losses would also have been significant. Fearing the consequences of a military capture of the city, the inhabitants of Tabriz decided to surrender it and appealed to Osman Pasha, who in response banned pogroms and plundering. Nevertheless, a portion of the Ottoman troops disobeyed and burst into the city, whose rulers were forced to make a decision to evacuate. On September 20, 1585 (September 25), Tabriz was occupied by Ottoman troops. On September 29, the construction of a fortress began in Tabriz, completed within a month.

The Qizilbash did not reconcile themselves to the loss of the city, and on October 15, a clash took place in the Timsah valley between Hamza Mirza and a small (500 warriors) detachment of Mahmudi Hasan Bey left behind by Sinan Pasha. Mahmudi Hasan Bey perished, as did his entire detachment. In the autumn of 1585, the Ottomans carried out a slaughter in Tabriz; the property of the citizens was plundered, thousands of men were killed, and women and children were led away into captivity. Osman Pasha did not want to or could not prevent the bloodshed. Historians describe Osman Pasha's role in this and the circumstances of the tragedy differently: Peçevi wrote that on September 22, 1585, several Persian detachments attacked the sleeping Ottomans and killed many soldiers in their sleep, and several townspeople killed about a dozen Ottoman soldiers in a hammam. According to Peçevi, when Osman Pasha learned of the attack, he ordered a slaughter that lasted for three days. Almost immediately, he regretted the order, but he was no longer able to stop the soldiers. The account of Iskandar Beg Munshi is close to Peçevi's account. According to Iskandar Beg, at night the townspeople attacked the tents of the Ottomans, plundered, and killed soldiers. During the night, the inhabitants of Tabriz destroyed the walls of the fortress being built by the Ottomans. It reached the point where an Ottoman soldier was killed in the baths. This angered Osman Pasha, and he said: "The Tabrizis are rebels and deserve to be killed!" According to Rahimizade, the slaughter occurred spontaneously, and not by order of Osman Pasha. Osman Pasha allegedly tried to prevent the massacre and executed the soldiers involved in the incident, but the unrest in the city continued. Meanwhile, information was received regarding the approach of the Persian army to Tabriz, and Osman moved to Shamb-i Ghazan, a suburb of Tabriz. This attack was repulsed, and after this Osman passed away; this occurred on the night of October 29 to 30, 1585. According to Oruç Bey, Osman Pasha died of rapid angina. The death of the serdar was concealed even from the Ottoman soldiers; he was carried in a palanquin as if alive, but command was exercised by Cigalazade. However, the news of Osman's death got out somehow. In the words of Peçevi, the Qizilbash rejoiced and said: "Your evil serdar has died!"

Osman Pasha bequeathed to be buried in Diyarbekir. His double-domed tomb is located near the current Kurşunlu Mosque.

== Family ==
In 1578, with the aim of strengthening the alliance with the Shamkhal—the ruler of Dagestan—Osman Pasha married the daughter of his nephew Chupalav Bey (later Chupalav Shamkhal). The girl was famous for her beauty; in Istanbul, she was called the "Dagestani Beauty". Namık Kemal, in his novel Cezmi, published in 1880, called her Rabia-Mihridil. Şerafettin Erel also calls her so, but this name does not appear in any source prior to the end of the 19th century. In 1579, Osman Pasha was offered to become a damad by marrying the daughter of Selim II, the widow of Sokollu Mehmed Pasha—Esmehan Sultan. However, he declined this honor, since marrying a princess implied divorcing his wife. From the marriage with the Shamkhal's niece, Osman left a daughter. After Osman Pasha's death, his widow married the beylerbey of Bosnia. Oruç Bey and Tommaso Minadoi accused Osman Pasha of his father-in-law's death: allegedly Osman Pasha suspected him of ties with the Shah, and when the Shamkhal arrived to visit his daughter, Osman Pasha executed him.

== Sources ==
- A. N. Badak; I. E. Voynich; N. M. Volchek, eds. (1999). "Beginning of the second war of the Safavid state with Turkey (1578 — 1590); Campaign of the Turks against Tabriz in 1583". Development of the States of Eastern Europe. World History. Vol. 11. Minsk: Sovremenny Literator. pp. 386–393. ISBN 985-456-152-6.
- Blackburn, Q.R. (1995a). P. Bearman; Th. Bianquis; C.E. Bosworth; E. van Donzel; W.P. Heinrichs (eds.). "Othman pasha, Ozdemir-oglu". Encyclopaedia of Islam, Second Edition. VIII. Leiden: E. J. Brill: 183–185.
- Blackburn, Q.R. (1995b). P. Bearman; Th. Bianquis; C.E. Bosworth; E. van Donzel; W.P. Heinrichs (eds.). "Ozdemir Pasha". Encyclopaedia of Islam, Second Edition. VIII. Leiden: E.J. Brill: 235–236.
- Çiçek, Kemal (2007). "Osman Paşa, Özdemiroğlu" (PDF). TDV İslâm Ansiklopedisi (in Turkish). 33: 471–473.
- Danişmend, İsmail Hami (1947). İzahlı Osmanlı tarihi kronolojisi (PDF). Vol. 3. Türkiye Yayınevi.
- Dankoff, R.; Tezcan, N.; Sheridan, M. D. (2018). Ottoman Explorations of the Nile: Evliya Çelebi’s Map of the Nile and The Nile Journeys in the Book of Travels (Seyahatname). Gingko Library. ISBN 9781909942172.
- Erel, Şerafettin (1961). Nuri Akbayar (ed.). Dağıstan ve Dağıstanlılar. İstanbul Matbaası.
- Evliya Çelebi (1983). A. D. Zheltyakov (ed.). Book of Travels (Extracts from the work of the Turkish traveler of the XVII century). Lands of the Transcaucasus and adjacent regions of Asia Minor and Iran. Moscow: Nauka. Archived from the original on 2020-01-21.
- Finkel, Caroline (2017). The History of the Ottoman Empire: Osman's Dream. Pages of History. Moscow: AST. ISBN 978-5-17-043651-4.
- Farah, C. E. (1990). "Yemen Fortification and the Second Ottoman Conquest". Proceedings of the Seminar for Arabian Studies. 20. Oxford: Archaeopress: 31–42. ISSN 0308-8421. JSTOR 41223256.
- Fleischer, Cornell H. (2014). Bureaucrat and intellectual in the Ottoman Empire : the historian Mustafa Ali (1541—1600). Princeton, New Jersey: Princeton University Press. ISBN 9781400854219.
- Iskandar Beg (1930). Roger M. Savory (ed.). History Of Shah Abbas The Great. Vol. 1. Boulder, Colorado: Westview Press.
- Guseyn, Farakh; Rahimizade, Ibrahim (2005). Ottoman-Safavid War of 1578–1590: based on the works of the Ottoman chronicler Ibrahim Rahimizade. Baku: Nurlan. Archived from the original on 2021-04-19.
- Hammer-Purgstall, J.; Hellert, J.-J (1836). Histoire de l'Empire ottoman, depuis son origine jusqu'à nos jours (in French). Vol. 6. Paris: Bellizard Barthès, Dufour & Lowell.
- Holt, P. M.; Daly, M. W. (2014). "The Eastern Bilad al-Sudan from the early Sixteenth to the early Nineteenth Century". A History of the Sudan: From the Coming of Islam to the Present Day. London: Routledge. ISBN 9781317863663.
- İnalcık, H. (1991). B. Lewis; Ch. Pellat; J. Schacht (eds.). "Gazi Giray II". Encyclopaedia of Islam, Second Edition. II. Leiden: E.J. Brill: 1046–1047.
- İpşirli, Mehmed (2002). "Koca Sinan Paşa". Islam Ansiklopedisi (in Turkish). 26: 137–139.
- Ivanov, N. A. (1984). The Ottoman Conquest of Arab Countries, 1516-1574. Main Editorial Office of Eastern Literature of the "Nauka" Publishing House.
- Minadoi, Giovanni Tommaso (1587). Historia Della Guerra Fra Turchi Et Persiani: Cominciando dall'anno MDLXXVII nel quale furo li primi movimenti di lei, segundo per tutto l'anno MDLXXXV. Tornerio & Donangeli.
- Minadoi, Giovanni Tommaso (1595). The history of the warres betweene the Turkes and the Persians. Translated by Abraham Hartwell. By [John Windet for] Iohn Wolfe.
- Nahrawālī, Muḥammad ibn Aḥmad (2002). Lightning Over Yemen: A History of the Ottoman Campaign in Yemen, 1569—71. I.B. Tauris. ISBN 1860648363.
- Orhonlu, Cengiz (1996). "Habeş Eyaleti" (PDF). Islam Ansiklopedisi (in Turkish). 14: 363–367.
- Oruç Bey Bayat (2007). Russia and Europe through the eyes of Oruç Bey Bayat — Don Juan of Persia. Translated by O. Efendiyev; A. Farzaliyev. St. Petersburg: SPbSU. Archived from the original on 2019-05-28.
- Peçevî, İbrahim (1982). Bekir Sıtkı Baykal (ed.). Peçevi tarihi. Vol. 2. İstanbul Matbaası.
- Peçevi, Ibrahim Efendi (1988). History. Translated by Z. M. Bunyatov. Baku: Elm. Archived from the original on 2016-04-24.
- Peirce, Leslie P. (1993). The Imperial Harem: Women and Sovereignty in the Ottoman Empire. Oxford: Oxford University Press. ISBN 0195086775.
- Rubinshtein, I. L., ed. (1937). "Christopher Barrow. 1579–1581". English Travelers in the Muscovite State in the XVI century. Translated by Yu. V. Gautier. Technical editor: O. S. Prokhorova. Leningrad: OGIZ. pp. 262–285.
- Sharaf Khan Bidlisi (1976). Sharaf-name. Monuments of Eastern Literature. Vol. XXI, 2. Translated by E. I. Vasilieva. Preface, notes, and appendices by E. I. Vasilieva. Moscow: Nauka.
- Smirnov, V. D. (1887). The Crimean Khanate under the supremacy of the Ottoman Porte until the beginning of the XVIII century. St. Petersburg: University Printing House. pp. 436–446.
- Tunca, Ece (2017). "Depiction of the enemy through the eyes of an Ottoman bureaucrat-soldier: Âsafi's Şeca'atname (The book of Valor) in the context of Ottoman-Safavid Rivalry" (PDF). MA Thesis in Comparative History. Budapest: Central European University. Archived (PDF) from the original on 2020-08-23.
- Türk, A. (2000). The Crimean Khanate Under the Reign of Ğazı II Giray (Thesis ed.). Ankara: Bilkent University.
- "Battle of the Torches". Kumyk World. Archived from the original on 2019-05-29.
