= Nedra (disambiguation) =

Nedra is a genus of moths of the family Noctuidae.

Nedra or NEDRA may also refer to:

- Nedra (film), 1915 silent film
- Nedra (given name)
- Jean-Emmanuel Nédra (born 1993), French footballer
- National Electric Drag Racing Association

== East Slavic ==
- Nedra Publishers (1922–1931), Soviet literary publisher, 1922–1931
- Nedra almanac, Soviet literary almanac
- Nedra Publishers, Soviet and Russian geosciences publishing house, since 1963
- Nedra River, Ukraine
- Nedra (village), Ukraine
