= Vladimir Fritsche =

Soviet literary and art scholar

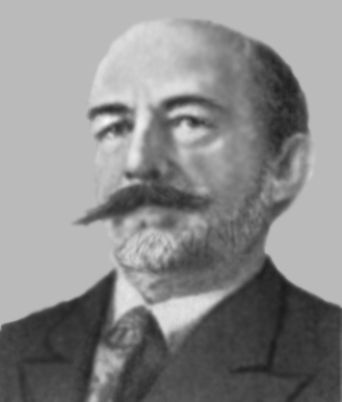
Vladimir Maksimovich Fritsche

Vladimir Maksimovich Fritsche (Russian: Владимир Максимович Фриче; 27 October [O.S.] 15 October] 1870 – 4 September 1929) was a Russian and Soviet Marxist literary and art scholar, critic and academic.

== Biography ==
Fritsche was born into a middle-class family of German origin in Moscow. After his family's departure to Germany, he supported himself financially by giving lessons. After graduating in 1889 with a medal from a German gymnasium, he entered the Faculty of History and Philology of Imperial Moscow University, where he studied first classical philology, then Western literature. He was the initiator of the creation, and then a member, of the Circle of Lovers of Western European Literature alongside Pyotr Kogan and Konstantin Balmont. After graduating from the university in 1894, Fritsche became a faculty member at the Department of General Literature. He joined the Russian Social Democratic Labour Party in 1905 and from 1905 to 1907 he was a member of the literary and lecture group of the RSDLP.

Fritsche was the founding editor of the magazine Zhurnalist in 1914, a magazine which was dedicated to analysis of mass media.

On 7 December 1917, he was appointed commissar for the protection of appanage and palace property in Moscow. In March 1918, he was Commissar for Foreign Affairs of the Council of People's Commissars of the Moscow City Council.

After the Russian Civil War he was involved in educational and scientific activities. A member of the Commission of the People's Commissariat of Education the RSFSR (known as the Rothstein Commission), he became director of the Institute of Language and Literature of the Academy of Sciences in 1922 as well as a professor at the Moscow State University.

Fritsche was director of the Literary Department of the Institute of Red Professors, and section of literature at the Communist Academy. He was rector of the Russian Association of the Social Science Institutions (RANION) from 1927. He was first editor of the journal Literature and Marxism.

In 1929 after the Soviet state decided to take control over the Academy of Sciences of the Soviet Union, Fritsche was chosen as a candidate alongside Nikolai Lukin and Abram Deborin to become Academicians of the Academy of Sciences. Despite the pressure, all three Communist candidates failed to get elected. Considering the real threat of the dissolution of the USSR Academy of Sciences, the leadership of the Academy was forced to decide on a second ballot with the participation of newly elected academicians. As a result, on February 13, all three were elected. Fritsche also took over editorship of the literary journal Print and Revolution, a journal published by Gosizdat.

Fritsche was the responsible editor of the first two volumes of the Literary Encyclopedia. He died during the preparation of the 3rd volume but until the 9th volume his name was on the list of the editorial board.

Vladimir Fritsche is buried at the Vvedenskoye Cemetery.
