= Literary Encyclopedia =

Soviet literary encyclopedia

Literary Encyclopedia (Russian: Литературная энциклопедия) is a 12-volume encyclopedia published in the USSR from 1929 until 1939. It contains more than 5000 entries with a focus on Russian and Soviet authors, as well as literary schools, trends, directions, and literary concepts. The 10th volume was delayed by Soviet censors in 1937, rumored to be a result of concerns about the article "Russian literature" The series was halted in 1939 after the publication of the 11th volume. The 12 volume was published later based on drafts.

== Volumes ==
- Volume 1: Abay - Byvalov (1930))
- Volume 2: Bylinas - Griboedov (1929)
- Volume 3: Grigorovich - Dyalsky (1930)
- Volume 4: The Gospel - Ishki (1930)
- Volume 5: Kaan - Kiichelbecker (1931)
- Volume 6: La Barth - (1932)
- Volume 7: Marly - German Literature (1934)
- Volume 8: German - Plutarch (1934)
- Volume 9: Pnin - Roman (1935)
- Volume 10: Romanov - "The Contemporary" (Journal of Nekrasov and II Panayeva) (1937)
- Volume 11: Stanzas - Forteguerri (1939)
- Volume 12: Fortunat - Iashvili (not completed)

Drafts and manuscripts of volumes 10 through 12 were preserved and have been used to construct the planned content. In 2005, ETS Publishing House released a CD-ROM which included some restored materials.

== Editors and contributors ==
Managing Editor (Volume 1–6), Editor (Volumes 7–11):

- V. M. Fritsche (Volumes 1–2)
- A. V. Lunacharsky (Volumes 3–11)

Executive secretary (Volumes 1–5), Academic Secretary (Volumes 6–11):

- O. Beskin (Volumes 1–5)
- M. S. Gelfand (Volume 6)
- E. N. Mikhailova (Volumes 7–11)

Editorial Board:

- I. M. Bespalov (Volumes 2–4)
- P. I. Lebedev-Polyansky
- Lunacharsky
- I. L. Matza (Volumes 2–9)
- I. M. Nusinov
- V. F. Pereverzev (Volumes 1–3)
- N. I. Skrypnyk (Volumes 1–6)
- V. M. Fritsche (Volumes 1–9)

== See also ==
- Soviet Concise Literary Encyclopedia (9 volumes, 1962–1978)
