= Artemic Khalatov =

Artemic Bagratovich Khalatov
- Артемий Багратович Халатов
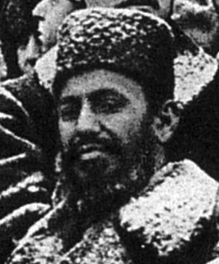
- Khalatov, 7 November 1919 at the celebrations of the second anniversary of the October Revolution

Head of the State Publishing House
- In office 1927–1932
- Preceded by: Otto Schmidt
- Succeeded by: Mikhail Tomsky

Personal details
- Born: Artashes Khalatiants; 27 April 1894 Baku, Russian Empire
- Died: 27 October 1937 (aged 43) Moscow, Russian Soviet Federative Socialist Republic, Soviet Union
- Education: Moscow Commercial Institute
- Profession: Publisher, economist

Artemic (Artashes) Bagratovich Khalatov (Russian: Артемий Багратович Халатов; 15 (27) April 1894 – 26 September 1937 or 27 October 1938) (sources differ) was a Bolshevik revolutionary and Soviet politician who was the director of the Soviet Union's State Publishing House, from 1927 to 1932. He was executed during the Great Purge.

== Biography ==
Khalatov was born Artashes Khalatiants in Baku. Although official biographies described him as coming from a working-class background, more recent research has shown that he was born into the family of a wealthy Armenian merchant. He was a student in the Moscow Commercial Institute and joined a Marxist circle while studying. After meeting Anastas Mikoyan he became involved in revolutionary activities.

After the February Revolution of March 1917, Khalatov became deputy chairman of the Moscow City Food Committee. From October 26, 1917 he served as Deputy Extraordinary Commissioner, from the beginning of 1918, as Moscow Extraordinary Commissioner for Food and Transport. During the Civil War of 1917-1923 he was in leading positions in the People's Commissariat of Food and the Main Directorate for the supply of the army. He was sent to Ukraine in order to negotiate with Pavlo Skoropadskyi (Hetman of Ukraine in 1918) for food supplies, but was arrested and then returned to the RSFSR. He became a member of the All-Russian Central Executive Committee and a permanent member of the Moscow City Council.

From to 1928 he was Chairman of the Commission for the Improvement of the Life of Scientists (Tsentral'naya komissiya po uluchsheniyu byta uchyonikh - TSEKUBU) under the Councils of People's Commissars of the RSFSR and the USSR and resolved issues relating to the supply of scientists. From 1922 he served as a member of the board of the People's Commissariat of Railways, and in 1927, he became a member of the board of the People's Commissariat of Education, chairman of the board of the State Publishing House and of its successor, the OGIZ. He played a significant role in the development of censorship and the ideologization of Soviet literature.

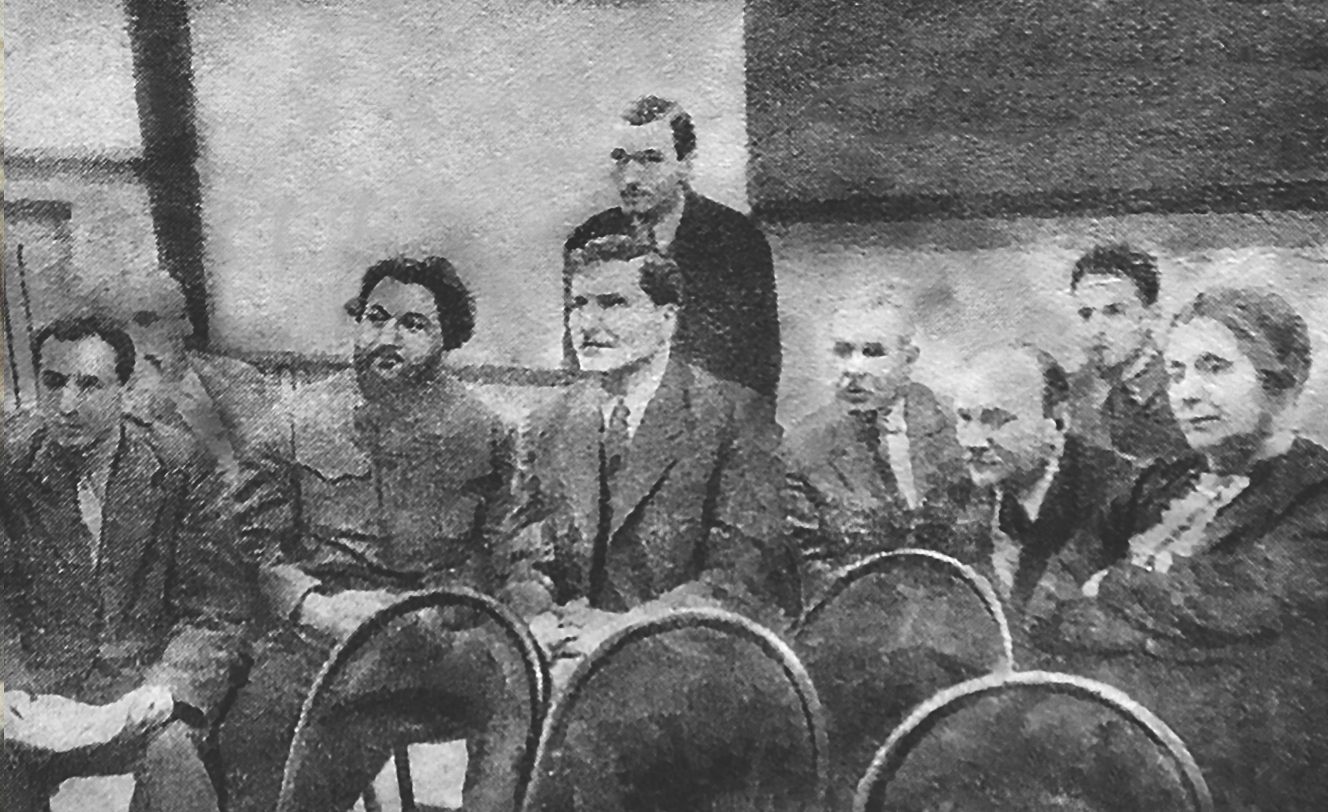
Artemic Khalatov (second from left) and Vlas Chubar (center), 1936

From 1935 to 1937 Khalatov was head of the Central Committee of the All Union Society of Inventors. He actively participated in the Great Purge of 1936-1938 by publishing defamatory articles about various groups of people who were already the focus of the Soviet state security (NKVD). During this period he wrote and published works on political economy as well. However, his loyalty to the party line did not prevent him from falling victim to the purge. In 1937 Khalatov was expelled from the Communist Party. Arrested in 1938, he was executed on October 27, 1938. Artemic Khalatov was posthumously rehabilitated in 1956.

His body is buried at the Donskoye cemetery in Moscow.
