= Print and Revolution =

Soviet literary magazine

First issue of Print and Revolution, 1921

Print and Revolution was a Soviet literary-critical magazine whose official subtitle was "a journal of literature, art, criticism and bibliography". It was published between 1921 and 1930 by Gosizdat, the State Publishing House of the RSFSR.

The magazine was set up by Vyacheslav Polonsky, at the time the head of the House of Press. As Editor in Chief he led an editorial board which included:

- Anatoly Lunacharsky
- Nikolai Meshcheryakov
- Ivan Skvortsov-Stepanov
- Mikhail Pokrovsky

== Dissolution of the magazine 1929-1930 ==
Vladimir Fritsche took over editorship of the magazine in 1929. He was supported by Valerian Pereverzev, Platon Kerzhentsev. After the book reviews had been transferred to another publication, the magazine continued for another year, largely reflecting the views and work of the newly formed Litfront group. Ivan Bespalov became editor in 1930 before the magazine finally ceased publication later that year.
