= Pyotr Kogan =

Russian literary historian, critic, and academic (1872–1932)

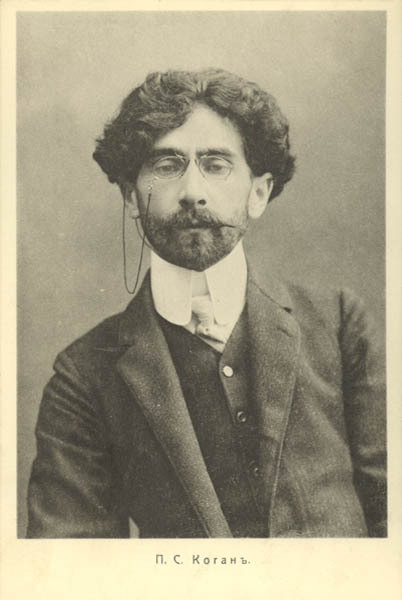
Pyotr Kogan, 1905

Pyotr Semyonovich Kogan (1 June 1872 – 2 May 1932) was Russian literary historian, philologist, literary critic and university professor.

== Biography ==
Born in to the family of a physician, Kogan attended high school in Mogilev and then studied at the historical and philological faculty of the Moscow University graduating in 1896. During his studies he was introduced to Marxist ideas and polemicized in publications against Yuly Aykhenvald and Mikhail Gerschenson and others. With Konstantin Balmont, Valery Bryusov and Vladimir Fritsche, Kogan founded the Circle of Friends of Western European Literature in 1894. He then taught in Moscow at various schools, including the Moscow Philharmonic Society School. He converted to the Russian Orthodox Church so that he could become a professor. However, the Minister of Education Nikolai Pavlovich Bogolepov, contrary to the law, did not allow him to prepare for a professorship.

In 1909 Kogan went to St. Petersburg and in 1910 he was elected private lecturer at the Chair of Germanic-Romance Philology at the St. Petersburg State University.

In 1917 Kogan returned to Moscow and taught at Moscow University after the October Revolution. In 1921 he became a professor of Germanic-Romance philology there. He also became president of the State Academy of Arts of the RSFSR in Moscow, founded in 1921, which pursued similar goals to the Bauhaus and existed until 1930. He was an employee of the People's Commissariat of Education of the RSFSR and served as chairman of the artistic section of the State Academic Council.

He was buried at the Novodevichy Cemetery in Moscow.
