= Battle of Sunzha River =

1583 battle of the Ottoman–Safavid War

Battle of the Sunzha River
- Part of Ottoman–Safavid War (1578–1590)
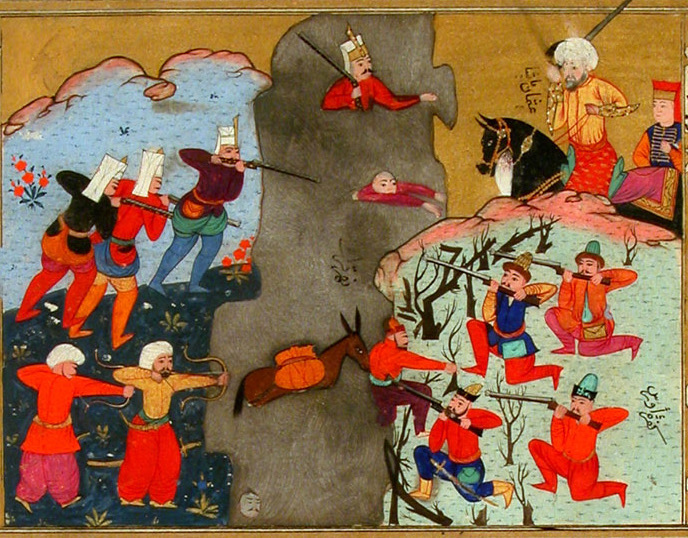
- Cossacks (right) attack the Ottoman army (left) at the crossing of the Terek.
Date	October 28–30, 1583
Location	Sunzha River, North Caucasus
Result	Ottoman victory

Belligerents
Ottoman Empire	Don Cossacks; Principality of Okotskaya

Commanders and leaders
Özdemiroğlu Osman Pasha	Shikh-Murza Okotsky

Strength
~4,000 (Ottoman veterans)	Thousands of Cossacks (Ottoman claim)

Casualties and losses
Heavy	Most of initial force killed; ~200 escaped

The Battle of the Sunzha River (Note: Turkish: Sunç Nehri Muharebesi; Russian: Битва на реке Сунже; Ukrainian: Битва на річці Сунжа; Chechen: Соьлжа хи тӀехь тӀом) took place between October 28 and 30, 1583, near the Sunzha River in the North Caucasus. The battle saw a 4,000-strong Ottoman column led by Özdemiroğlu Osman Pasha engage a combined force of Chechens and Don Cossacks, commanded by Shikh-Murza Okotsky.

As the Ottoman forces marched from Derbent toward Kerch, they were ambushed during a river crossing. Although they managed to repulse the initial assault and destroy a fortified Cossack camp, the Ottoman troops were subjected to repeated attacks and scorched-earth tactics in the aftermath of the initial ambush, which significantly disrupted their advance. After three days of continuous warfare, the Cossacks disengaged and fled, but only after inflicting considerable losses on the Ottoman army.

== Prelude ==
After the outbreak of war between the Ottoman and Safavid Empires in 1578, one of the primary supply routes for the army of Özdemiroğlu Osman Pasha—operating in Shirvan since the autumn of 1578—stretched from Kefe through the North Caucasus to Derbent. The increasing presence of Ottoman troops in the region prompted the resumption and strengthening of relations between Kabarda and Russia. Taking advantage of the conflict, the Kabardian Grand Prince Qambolet Yidar appealed to Moscow for assistance, requesting that the Russian Tsar protect them "from the Crimean Khan and other enemies." The Russian government provided assistance. A military leader, Lev Novosiltsev, was sent along with a group of streltsy to construct a new fortress in the area. The Tsardom, seeking to strengthen its influence in the region even further, sought to secure alliances with the local nobility of Kabarda. A directive from Moscow summoned two prominent Kabardian princes—Mamstruk Temruqo and Qaziy Pshiapshoqo—to enter Russian service with up to 300 Circassians. They were ordered to arrive in Astrakhan by the feast day of Saint Simeon and then proceed to Ukraine to join Temruqo Idar before winter. The two princes were then instructed to move their troops to the southern borders of the Tsardom in order to carry out border service and to prevent incursions by the Crimean Tatars into the interior regions of the country. In 1578, the senior prince of Kabardia, Kambulat Idarov, visited Moscow.

As a consequence of these political maneuvers, the relations between Kabarda and Russia, which had been interrupted in the beginning of the decade, were restored in 1578, and Russian military presence in the North Caucasus was reinforced, threatening the Ottoman supply route running from Kefe to Derbent. In the same year, a Crimean army led by Adil Giray marched to Shirvan to aid the Ottomans in their war against the Safavids. The Kabardian princes and the Russian voivode Lev Novosiltsev allowed the Crimeans to pass through Kabarda. After reaching Shirvan, the Crimean army was badly beaten by the Safavids in the Battle of Mollahasanli, with their commander being taken prisoner. The remnants of the army, which amounted to c. 10,000, were scattered by the Russians on their retreat back to Crimean territory.

Following this, the Russians and their allies, operating near the Terek River, increasingly started harassing Ottoman convoys traversing the route. In 1582, a supply mission dispatched by Serdar Ferhat Pasha succeeded in delivering treasury funds and provisions to Osman Pasha’s forces despite facing strong resistance. The convoy returned to Kefe under difficult conditions. By 1583, tensions in the North Caucasus had escalated further, as local groups including Don Cossacks and Chechen fighters increased their attacks on Ottoman movements along this route.

== Battle ==
Following his victory over the Safavids in the Battle of Torches in May 1583, which consolidated Ottoman control over Shirvan, Osman Pasha was ordered by the Sublime Porte to march to Kefe, with the aim of overthrowing the rebellious Crimean Khan Mehmed Giray, who had refused to send troops to the Caucasus to fight against the Safavids since 1579. The Pasha departed from Derbent on October 21 and headed west with an elite force of approximately 4,000 soldiers, mainly veterans of the Shirvan campaign.

On October 28, as the Ottomans attempted to cross the Sunzha River—a tributary of the Terek River known in Ottoman sources as Kanlı Sevinç Suyu—they were ambushed by a coalition army consisting of Don Cossacks and Chechens under the command of Shikh-Murza Okotsky.

According to Osman Pasha’s own account to a Russian envoy, the initial Cossack force was almost entirely wiped out, with only around 200 fighters escaping. However, the Ottomans soon found themselves under continued harassment: over the next three days, the retreating Chechen and Cossack forces launched guerrilla-style ambushes from the forests, and set fire to large sections of the steppe, slowing the Ottoman advance toward Kerch and inflicting further losses.

The Ottomans succeeded in repelling the initial assault and destroying a Cossack fortified camp.

== Aftermath ==
After regrouping, the Ottoman contingent continued its advance through the Northern Caucasus and moved westward across the Kuban River and the Taman Peninsula, eventually reaching Kerch and returning to Kefe. In the following year, elements of these forces participated in operations against the Crimean Khanate, successfully overthrowing Mehmed Giray and installing İslam Giray on the Crimean throne.

In subsequent years, the Ottoman Turks and Crimean Tatars continued to launch attempts to pass through the North Caucasus in order to reach the South Caucasus. The Muscovite tsar renounced any connection with the activities of ‘those fugitive and lawless Cossacks’.
