= Battle of Alvar =

1585 battle

- Part of Ottoman–Safavid War (1578–1590)
Date	September 21, 1585
Location	Alvar, Tabriz
Result	Ottoman victory

Belligerents
Ottoman Empire	Safavid Iran

Commanders and leaders
(Ottoman Empire) Osman Pasha (Ottoman Empire) Yusuf Sinan Pasha (Ottoman Empire) Mehmed Pasha	(Safavid Iran) Hamza Mirza (Safavid Iran) Qilinj Bey † (Safavid Iran) Unknown Garadagh Ruler (POW) (Safavid Iran) Divan Bey of Hamza (POW)

Strength
10,000–15,000	10,000

Casualties and losses
Light	500–1,000 casualties

The Battle of Alvar (also referred to as Alvar or Elver) was a significant engagement during the Ottoman-Safavid War of 1578–1590. On September 21, 1585, the Ottoman army, under the command of Özdemiroğlu Osman Pasha, defeated the Safavid forces led by Hamza Mirza. Following this victory, the Ottoman military advanced to capture Tabriz on September 25, 1585.

== Background ==
Following the capture of Erivan in 1583 and the subsequent defeat of the Safavid army at the Battle of Torches (Məşəl savaşı), which secured control over Shirvan, the Ottoman military designated the former Safavid capital of Tabriz as its next primary objective.

After wintering in Kastamonu during 1584–1585, the Ottoman army under the command of Grand Vizier and Serdar-i Ekrem (Commander-in-Chief) Özdemiroğlu Osman Pasha set out for the campaign. The Ottoman army subsequently reached Erzurum via the Amasya-Tokat-Sivas route.

Upon hearing that the Safavid ruler Mohammad Khodabanda was concentrating his forces near Tabriz, Osman Pasha also advanced toward the city. By the time the Ottoman army reached Sufian on September 20, the Safavids had created two strategies against them: First, to destroy grain and water resources along the Ottoman route, evacuate the civilian population of Tabriz, and then destroy the weakened Ottoman army by cornering them outside the city with a large-scale attack; and second, to wage a defensive war by relying on the people of Tabriz. Taking the second strategy as the basis, the construction of fortifications and barricades began within Tabriz.

== Battle ==
Advancing from Sufian toward Tabriz, the Ottoman army first encountered the Safavids near Sufian. The Ottoman army organized into battle formation and continued its advance. Governor of Van Cığalızadə Yusuf Sinan Pasha and Governor of Diyarbakır Solak Ferhad Pashazade Mehmed Pasha advanced to the front of the army with their troops. On the right flank stood Anatolian Governor Hasan Pasha with a limited number of Rumelian and Sivas soldiers, while the left flank was held by Aleppo Governor Okçuzade Mehmed Pasha alongside soldiers from Erzurum and Tripoli.

In response, troops under the command of the Safavid prince Hamza Mirza approximately 5,000 infantry and 5,000 cavalry lay in ambush within the gardens surrounding Tabriz along the Ottoman approach route. As the Ottoman army neared Alvar, roughly 18 kilometers northwest of Tabriz, the concealed Safavid forces emerged from their positions and launched an attack on the Ottoman left flank. Simultaneously, combat broke out with the Rumelian troops positioned on the Ottoman right flank on September 21, 1585.

Following the death of the commander of the Rumelian Delis in the initial clash, the Safavid forces intensified their pressure and began to push back the Ottoman right flank. As a result, Osman Pasha was forced to dispatch reinforcements under the command of Cığalızadə Yusuf Sinan Pasha and Solak Farhad to stabilize and strengthen the flank.

The newly arrived reinforcements launched a direct assault on the Safavid forces under the command of Hamza Mirza. Shaken by this offensive, the Safavid troops began to retreat, suffering losses and leaving behind prisoners of war. In the fighting that continued until the afternoon, Qochu Bey, the son of the Solak Farhad, killed the Safavid Pazuki ruler Qilinj Bey. Additionally captured the ruler of Garadagh and Hamza Mirza's Divan Bey. (Note: Chief of Justice) Hamza Mirza retreated and joined his father, Mohammad Khodabanda, who was waiting with the main Safavid army 12 miles away from Tabriz.

== Aftermath ==
After neutralizing the Iranian ambush at Alvar and forcing Hamza Mirza into a retreating defeat, the Ottoman army continued its advance. On September 23, they reached the Acısu river, which flows north of Tabriz, and arrived at the city’s outskirts. Recognizing that they could not withstand the superior firepower of the Ottoman artillery after the ensuing skirmishes, the garrison and the people of Tabriz surrendered on September 25, 1585.
