= Battle of Al-Qahira (1569) =

Clash during the Ottoman invasion of Yemen

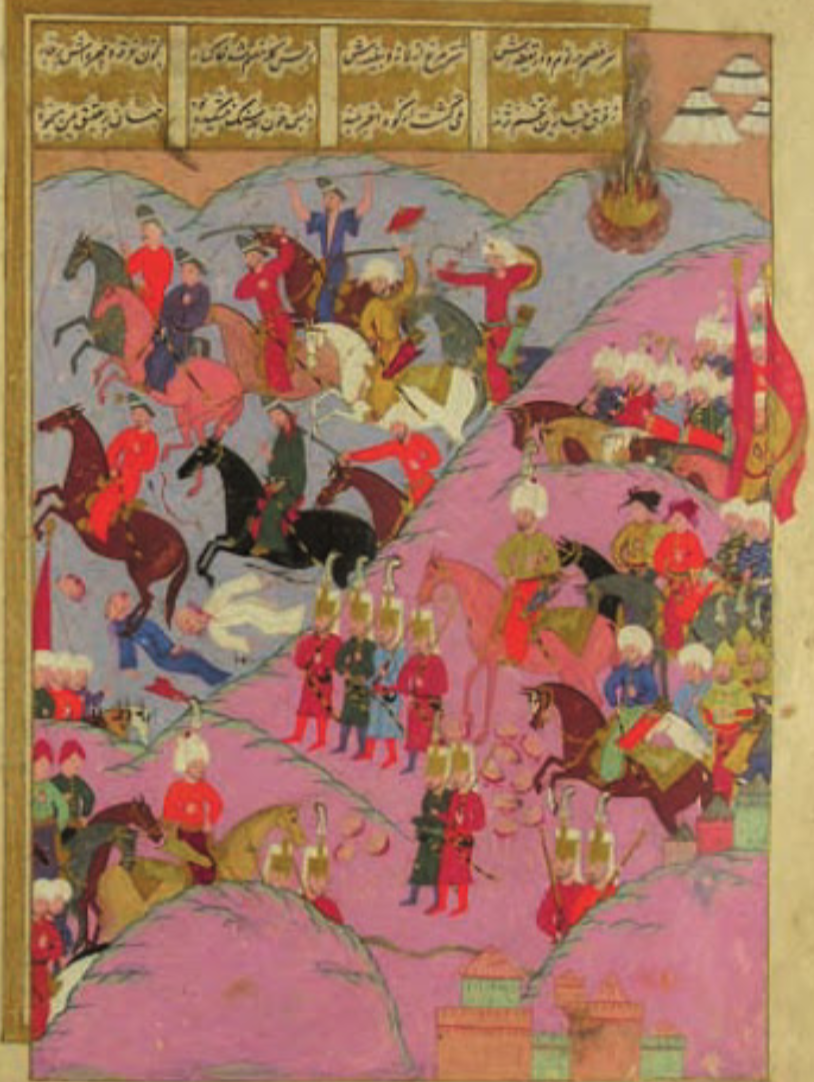
- Osman Pasha in Yemen
Date	April 29, 1569
Location	Al-Qahira, Yemen
Result	Ottoman victory

Belligerents
Ottoman Empire	Imams of Yemen

Commanders and leaders
Özdemiroğlu Osman Pasha; Koca Sinan Pasha	Al-Mutahhar; Saladin; İbn-i Şevi

Strength
3,000–4,000	40,000

Casualties and losses
Heavy	Heavy

The Battle of Al-Qahira (April 29, 1569) was a military engagement between Ottoman forces under Özdemiroğlu Osman Pasha and Koca Sinan Pasha and Yemeni forces under Al-Mutahhar, fought during the Ottoman campaign to reassert control over Yemen. The battle centered on the Al-Qahira fortress, a strategically important mountaintop fortification near Taiz. The engagement resulted in an Ottoman victory following the timely arrival of Sinan Pasha's reinforcements, after which Al-Mutahhar retreated to Sanaa and the fortress surrendered.

== Background ==
Departing Egypt, Osman Pasha marched on Yemen, taking with him 3,000-4,000 soldiers and the Red Sea fleet captain Hızır Reis. Setting out from Suez with 17 ships, Osman Pasha stopped at Jeddah, disembarked the cavalry, and ordered them to advance south by land. He himself landed at Hudaydah with the infantry.

== Battle ==
Osman Pasha marched on Taiz, which had been under Yemeni occupation for 10 months, and conquered the city. Following Osman Pasha's first military victory in Yemen, he laid siege to the Al-Qahira fortress, a strategically important mountaintop fortification in the region close to Taiz. However, during this siege, Saladin, the castle's keeper, reinforced the castle's defenses, while the sons of Ibn Shawi and Mutahhar, arriving from the provinces with a large army, attacked Osman Pasha's forces, putting the Ottoman forces in a difficult position. Osman Pasha continued his struggle despite being surrounded by enemy forces on multiple fronts. The Ottoman troops, further weakened by the tightening of the siege, were exhausted by hunger and thirst, and many perished. The martyrdom of several of the commanders, in particular, had a profound psychological impact on the army. Just when the army was desperately forced to make peace, Sinan Pasha arrived with his forces on April 29, 1569, relieving the besieged Ottoman troops. Sinan Pasha's arrival near Taiz with his army gave Osman Pasha a sigh of relief. Faced with new developments, Al-Mutahhar gathered his camp and retreated to Sanaa. As a result, the Ottoman army gained considerable booty, and the castle guard surrendered without hesitation. Thus, the city of Taiz was secured.
