= Battle of Koyun Gecidi =

- Part of Ottoman–Safavid War (1578–1590)
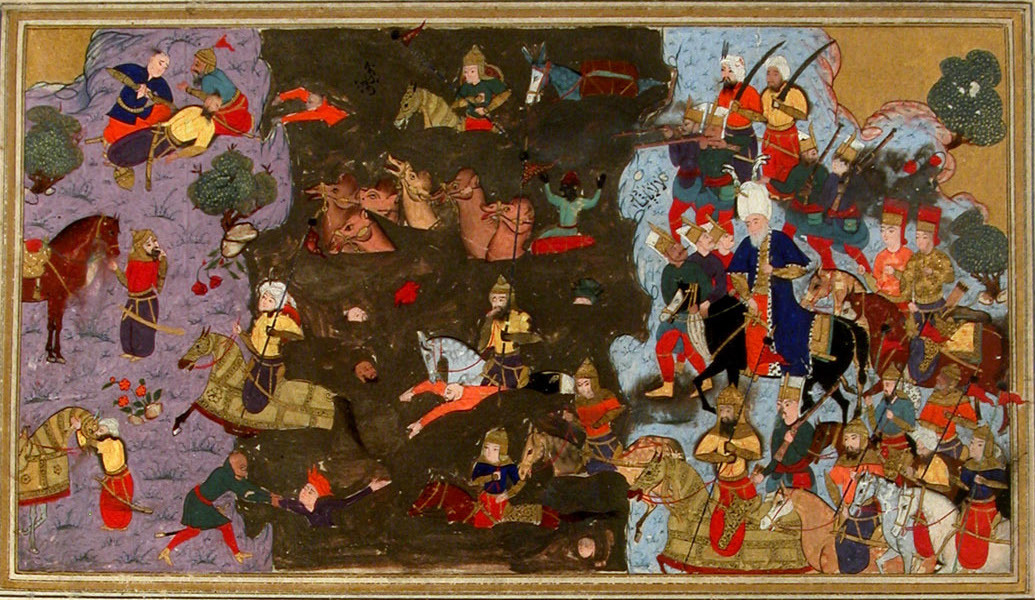
- Illustration of the battle
Date	September 9, 1578
Location	Koyun Gecidi, Mingachevir
Result	Ottoman victory

Belligerents
Ottoman Empire	Safavid Iran

Commanders and leaders
(Ottoman Empire) Osman Pasha (Ottoman Empire) Asafi Pasha (Ottoman Empire) Mustafa Pasha	(Safavid Iran) Amir Khan Turkman (Safavid Iran) Murad Khan † (Safavid Iran) Sharaf Khan Bitlisi (Safavid Iran) Khalifa Ansar (Safavid Iran) Dunbul Haji Bey

Strength
Unknown	20,000

Casualties and losses
Unknown	~15,000–20,000 killed

The Battle of Koyun Gecidi (Turkish: Koyun Geçidi Muharebesi) was a major battle during the Ottoman–Safavid War (1578–1590). The battle took place on September 9, 1578, and Ottoman victory achieved in this battle opened the way to Shirvan. The battle took place at the Koyun Gecidi crossing on the banks of the Alazani (Qanıq) River.

== Background ==
The Ottoman offensive commenced in the summer of 1578, as a force of approximately 100,000 men mobilized from Erzurum to begin an eastward campaign. During the initial stages of the march, Ottoman forces reduced several minor fortifications that had refused to surrender. The first major engagement of the campaign occurred near Lake Çıldır, where the Safavid army handicapped by inferior numbers and a lack of artillery, was decisively defeated.

Following the victory at Çıldır, the Ottoman military advanced and captured Tiflis without further resistance. On September 8, the army under the command of Lala Mustafa Pasha departed Tiflis, reaching the city of Aresh by September 16. Located in the modern-day Yevlakh District of Azerbaijan, Aresh was situated near the confluence of the Qanıq (Alazani) and Kura rivers. During this period, the Ottoman force began to suffer from severe logistical challenges and a shortage of provisions.

The Safavid army, under the command of Amir Khan Turkman, reached the banks of the River on September 8 or 9, 1578. Here, Amir Khan’s forces were joined by the armies of Murad Khan the Governor of Mughan and his son, Sharaf Khan Bitlisi the Governor of Nakhchivan, Khalifa Ansar the Governor of Karadagh, Dunbul Haji Bey, and others. The combined strength of this unified army consisted of 20,000 troops.

== Battle ==
Upon learning of the Safavid pursuit, Lala Mustafa Pasha devised a tactical maneuver to trap the Safavid forces. He concentrated his troops on the peninsula formed at the confluence of the Qanıq and Kura rivers, where he planned the primary engagement. Mustafa Pasha positioned Dervis Pasha on the left flank and Bahram Pasha on the right, while he personally commanded the center.

As the battle commenced, a segment of the Ottoman army crossed the river to strike the Safavid from the rear. Simultaneously, the main Ottoman force and its artillery entered the fray. Under the command of Osman Pasha, Asafi, and Mustafa Pasha, the Ottoman army launched a synchronized assault from three directions. Significantly outnumbered and lacking artillery, the Safavid army could not withstand the onslaught and began to retreat. Upon reaching the river, some soldiers managed to swim across, while many others drowned or were killed by Ottoman forces.

== Aftermath ==
In the aftermath of the battle, according to Rahimizade, half of the 20,000-strong Safavid army drowned in the river, while 5,000 were killed in combat. Evliya Çelebi notes that, "according to rumors, 10,000 Qizilbash died, and another 10,000 drowned in the river like a flock of sheep." Among the dead was Murad Khan, son of Amir Khan Turkman. As a result of the victory achieved at the Battle of Koyun Gecidi, the path toward Shirvan was opened for the Ottoman army.
