= Nedra (given name) =

Nedra is a female given name. Notable people referred to by this name include the following:

- Nedra Bonds (born 1948), American quilter, activist, and retired teacher
- Nedra Johnson (born 1966), American rhythm and blues and jazz singer/songwriter and multi-instrumentalist
- Nedra Pickler (born 1975), American national political journalist
- Nedra Talley (1946–2026), American singer
- Nedra Tyre (1912–1990), American social worker and author
- Nedra Volz (1908–2003), American actress

== See also ==
- Jean-Emmanuel Nédra (born 1993), French footballer
- Nedra (disambiguation)
