= Sokolovići, Sokolac =

Sokolovići
- Village
- Location within Bosnia and Herzegovina
- Coordinates: 43°56′33″N 18°55′55″E
- Country: Bosnia and Herzegovina
- Entity: Republika Srpska
- Municipality: Sokolac
- Time zone: UTC+1 (CET)
  - Summer (DST): UTC+2 (CEST)

Sokolovići (Serbian Cyrillic: Соколовићи) is a village in the municipality of Sokolac, Bosnia and Herzegovina. According to the 1991 census, the village had 80 inhabitants, all of whom were ethnic Serbs.

== Notable people ==
- Sokollu Mehmed Pasha (c. 1505 – 1579), Ottoman general and Grand Vizier
- Lala Kara Mustafa Pasha (c. 1500 – 1580), Ottoman general and Grand Vizier
