= Concise Literary Encyclopedia =

Russian-language literary encyclopedia

The Concise Literary Encyclopedia (Russian: Краткая литературная энциклопедия) was a Soviet encyclopedia of literature published in nine volumes between 1962 and 1978. The main 8 volumes were published in 1962–1975, the additional 9th volume in 1978. In the encyclopaedia more than 12 thousand author articles (personalities of writers, reviews of periods, characteristics of literary terms, trends, literary groups, literary criticism and the press, etc.); The alphabetical index contains about 35,000 names, titles and terms. Edition - 100 000 copies.

The editor-in-chief of the USSR SS was Alexey Surkov; in fact, the publication was managed by deputy editor-in-chief Vladimir Zhdanov, and since 1969, by A.F. Yermakov.

Russian scholar John Glad wrote, "For the specialist in Russian literature, this is undoubtedly the most basic an important reference tool to appear from the Soviet Union. Scholars Barry Lewis and Michael Ulman wrote, "despite its shortcomings, must be considered an achievement comparable to the best Western productions of its type."

The preface to the first volume says that the encyclopaedia is called brief encyclopaedia since “it is not an exhaustive body of literary knowledge” and that the creation of a fundamental literary encyclopaedia is “a matter of the future”, but the more complete literary encyclopaedia has not been subsequently published.

In general, it is a “carefully prepared and highly professional publication.”

== Volumes ==
- Volume 1: Aarne - Gavrilov (1962)
- Volume 2: Gavrylyuk - Zyulfigar Shirvani (1964)
- Volume 3: Jacob - Laxness (1966)
- Volume 4: Lakshin - Muranovo (1967)
- Volume 5: Murari - Chorus (1968)
- Volume 6: Saying - "Soviet Russia" (1971)
- Volume 7: "Soviet Ukraine" - Phlyax (1972)
- Volume 8: Flaubert - Yashpal (1975)
- Volume 9: Index, omitted authors, and recent topics (1978)

The ninth volume was famous for the fact that it included articles about writers originally excluded from the glossary by ideological reasons, first of all about representatives of unrealistic trends in Soviet literature (Konstantin Vaginov, Alexander Vvedensky) and the first emigration (Georgy Adamovich, Don-Aminado, Nikolai Evreinov).

The subject heading does not contain the names of the emigrants of the 1970s, even those to whom the separate articles in the previous volumes of the encyclopaedia are devoted (Alexander Galich, Vladimir Maksimov, Viktor Nekrasov).

== See also ==
- Literary Encyclopedia
