= Gosizdat =

State Publishing House founded in the Russian Soviet Federative Socialist Republic

State Publishing House of the RSFSR (Russian: Госуда́рственное изда́тельство РСФСР), also known as Gosizdat (Госиздат), was a publishing house founded in the Russian Soviet Federative Socialist Republic on 21 May 1919. It was to become one of the principal publishing houses in the Soviet Union. In 1930 it was superseded by the Association of State Book and Magazine Publishing Houses or OGIZ (Объединение государственных книжно-журнальных издательств, Obyedinenie gosudarstvennykh knizhno-zhurnalnykh izdatelstv).

== History ==
It was formed at the People's Commissariat of Education of the RSFSR on May 20, 1919 in accordance with the Regulations of the All-Russian Central Executive Committee and on the initiative of Anatoly Lunacharsky. The publishing house was headed by an editorial board, the chairman and members of which were provided by the People's Commissariat of Education, appointed by the Council of People's Commissars and approved by the All-Russian Central Executive Commission

The decree founding Gosizdat placed all private publishing in Soviet Russia under their control. Although publishers were required to submit manuscripts before publication, Gosizdat was remarkably inefficient and was unable to enforce this. The most significant problems were lack of paper and maintaining the printing presses. Also the book trade had been municipalised in Moscow by October 1918, and from April 1919 to autumn 1921 all books were distributed free of charge by Tsentropechat.

In February 1921, following the report of the Litkens Commission, Gosizdat was incorporated as a department within Narkompros.

On October 8, 1930 the publishing house was transformed into the Association of State Book and Magazine Publishing Houses (OGIZ). In total, in the years 1919–1930, Gosizdat published 29,555 titles of books and pamphlets with a total circulation of 610.3 million copies.

== Directors ==
- 1919–21 Vatslav Vorovsky
- 1921–24 Otto Schmidt
- 1927–30 Artemic Khalatov

== Publications ==
=== Periodicals ===
- Print and Revolution "a journal of literature, art, criticism and bibliography", 1921-1930

=== Book catalogs ===
- L.D. Trotsky Sochineniia: Katalog knig, 1926. (Leon Trotsky books in print, 1926).
