= Lala Mustafa Pasha =

Grand Vizier of the Ottoman Empire in 1580

Lala Kara Mustafa Pasha
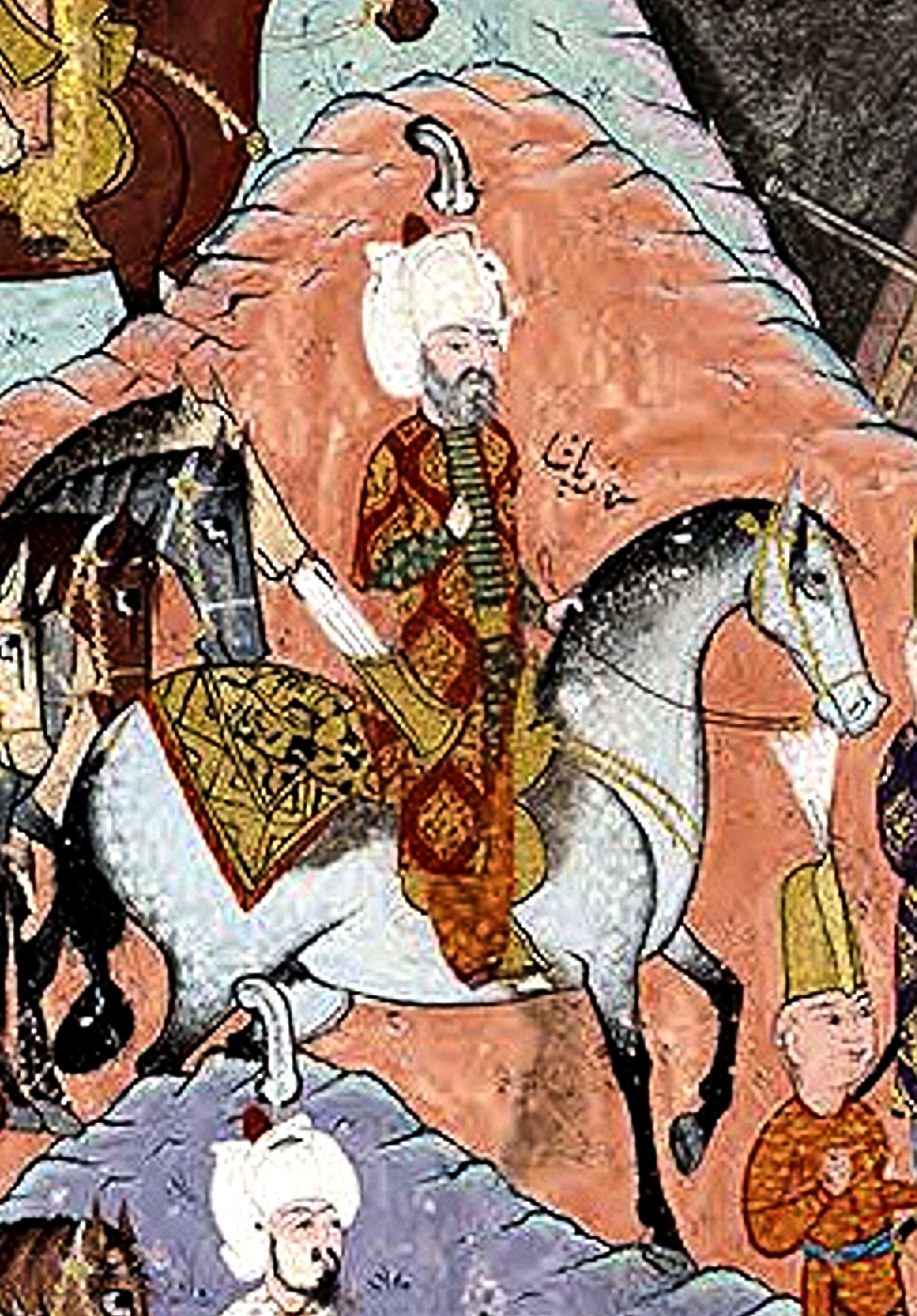
- Lala Mustafa Pasha (قره پاشا, "Qara Pasha") departing for war in 1578. Nusretname (1584)

Grand Vizier of the Ottoman Empire
- In office 28 April 1580 – 7 August 1580
- Monarch: Murad III
- Preceded by: Semiz Ahmed Pasha
- Succeeded by: Koca Sinan Pasha

Personal details
- Born: c. 1500 Sokolovići, Sanjak of Bosnia, Ottoman Empire
- Died: 7 August 1580 (aged 79–80) Constantinople, Ottoman Empire
- Spouse: Hümaşah Sultan (m. 1575)
- Relations: Sokollu Mehmed Pasha (cousin) Ferhad Pasha Sokolović (cousin or brother)
- Children: Sultanzade Abdülbaki Bey
- Occupation: Military strategist and Grand Vizier

Military service
- Battles/wars: Ottoman–Venetian War (1570–1573); Siege of Nicosia; Siege of Famagusta; Ottoman–Safavid War (1578–1590); Lala Mustafa Pasha's Caucasian campaign; Battle of Çıldır; Battle of Koyun Gecidi

Lala Mustafa Pasha (c. 1500 – 7 August 1580), also known by the additional epithet Kara, was an Ottoman general and Grand Vizier from the Sanjak of Bosnia.

== Life ==
He was born around 1500, near Sokolac in the Glasinac Plateau in the Sanjak of Bosnia to the Eastern Orthodox Christian Sokolović family. He is the younger brother of Deli Husrev Pasha. He had a long-standing feud with his cousin, Sokollu Mehmed Pasha.

Mustafa Pasha briefly served as kaymakam (acting governor) of the Egypt Eyalet in 1549. He had risen to the position of Beylerbeyi of Damascus and then to that of Fifth Vizier.

The honorific "Lala" means "tutor to the Sultan"; he was tutor to Sultan Suleiman the Magnificent's sons, including Şehzade Bayezid.

He commanded Ottoman land forces during the Ottoman–Venetian War (1570–1573) and the conquest of Venetian-held Cyprus (1570–1571), and the Caucasian campaign (1578). During the Cyprus campaign, Lala Mustafa Pasha, who was known for his cruelty towards vanquished opponents, ordered the Venetian commander of Famagusta, Marco Antonio Bragadin, flayed alive and other Venetian military officers killed on sight or executed, even though he had promised safe passage upon surrendering the city to the Ottoman army. This also meant that Mustafa had indicated his aggressive intentions to the Sultan's court.

He was a Damat ("bridegroom") to the Imperial family through his marriage to Hümaşah Sultan, the only daughter of Şehzade Mehmed. The two together had a son named Sultanzade Abdülbaki Bey.

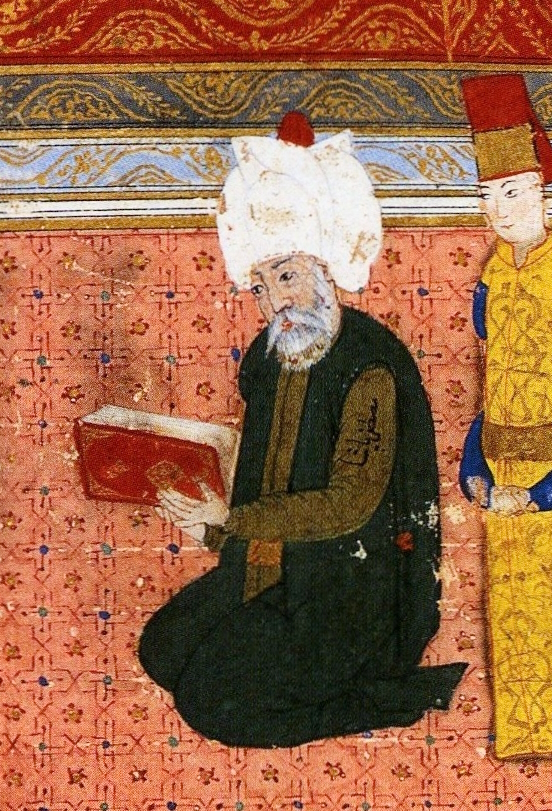
Lālā Muṣṭafa Paşa ("Mustapha Pasha") visiting the Mevlânâ ("Rumi") tomb in Konya

Following his succession of Semiz Ahmed Pasha as Grand Vizier, in the final three months of his life, he occupied the post from 28 April 1580 until his death. He is buried in the courtyard of the Eyüp Sultan Mosque in Istanbul. His tomb was designed by Ottoman architect Mimar Sinan.

== Death ==
Lala Mustafa Pasha died in 1580 in Constantinople due to old age or a heart attack. He was succeeded as Grand Vizier by the Albanian Koca Sinan Pasha.

== Issue ==
Lala Mustafa Pasha was the second husband of Hümaşah Sultan, Ottoman princess, daughter of Şehzade Mehmed and granddaughter of Sultan Suleiman the Magnificent and Hürrem Sultan. They married on 25 August 1575. By her, he had a son:

- Sultanzade Abdülbaki Bey. He married Safiye Hanımsultan, daughter of his mother's cousin Ismihan Sultan (daughter of Sultan Selim II and Nurbanu Sultan)

== Legacy ==
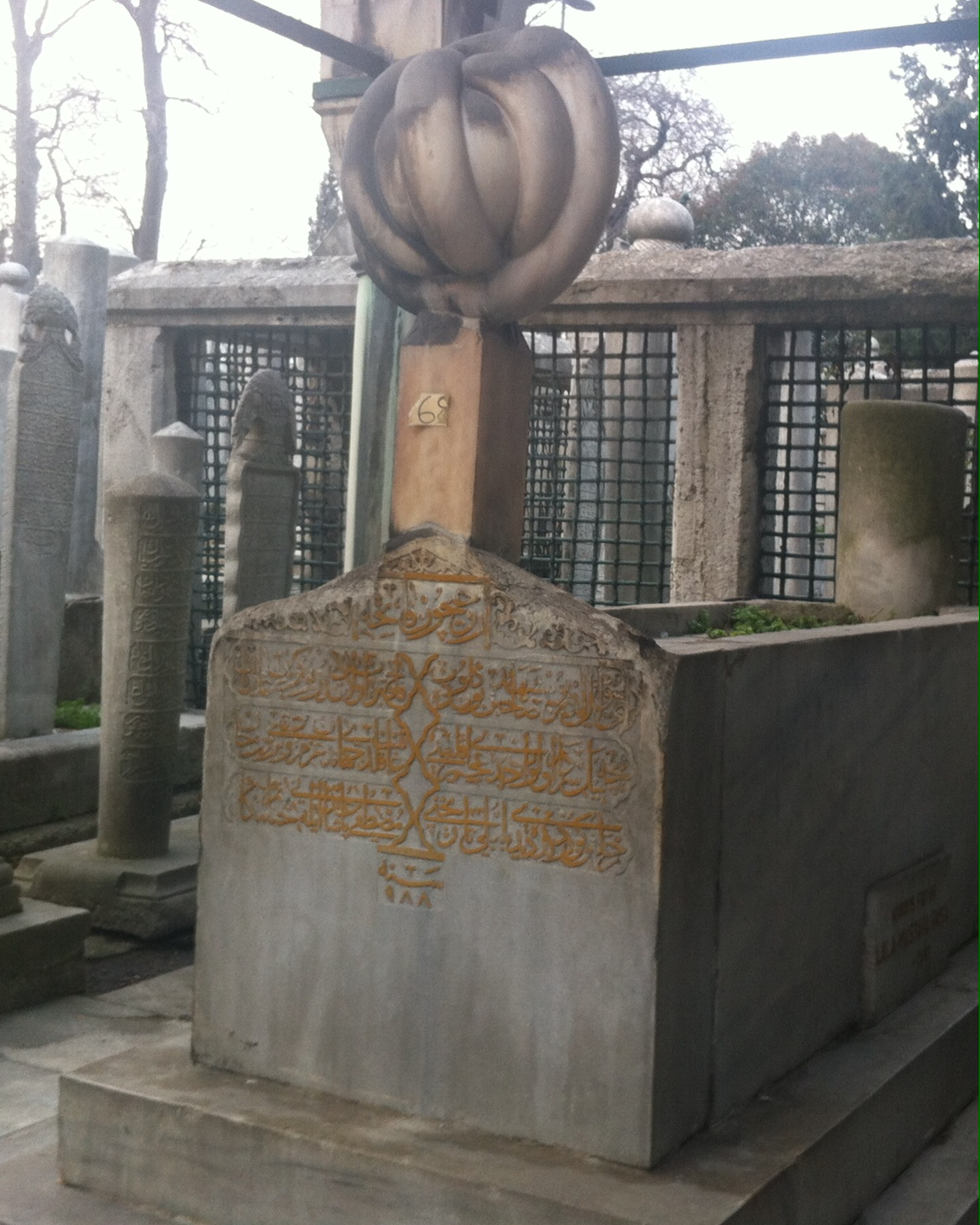
Tomb of Lala Mustafa Pasha in Eyüp Sultan Mosque

He has a street named after him in cities including Larnaca, Cyprus. He has a mosque named after him in Damascus, Syria. His invasion and brutal treatment of the Venetian leaders in Cyprus led to Pope Pius V promoting a Roman Catholic coalition against the Ottomans which turned into the Battle of Lepanto in 1571.

The Ottoman-Safavid war of 1578–1590 led to the creation of several illustrated manuscripts describing the accomplishments of commanders. One of them is the Nusretname ("Book of Victory") of the Ottoman bureaucrat Muṣṭafa ʿĀlī (d. 1600), which was devoted to Lala Mustafa Pasha’s campaigns or the Şeca'atname (Book of Valor) of Asafi (d. 1597–1598).

== In popular culture ==
In the 2011–2014 TV series Muhteşem Yüzyıl, he is portrayed by Macit Koper.

== See also ==
- Lala Mustafa Pasha's Caucasian campaign
- Ferhad Pasha Sokolović
- List of Ottoman governors of Egypt
- Ottoman Bosnia and Herzegovina

== Sources ==
- Bicheno, Hugh. Crescent and Cross: the Battle of Lepanto 1571. Phoenix, London, 2003. ISBN 1-84212-753-5.
- Costantini, Vera (2018). "Lala Mustafa Paşa". In Fleet, Kate; Krämer, Gudrun; Matringe, Denis; Nawas, John; Rowson, Everett (eds.). Encyclopaedia of Islam (3rd ed.). Brill Online. ISSN 1873-9830.
- Currey, E. Hamilton, Sea-Wolves of the Mediterranean,, London, 1910
- Foglietta, U. The sieges of Nicosia and Famagusta. London: Waterlow, 1903.

Political offices
Preceded by Davud Pasha as Governor	Ottoman Governor of Egypt (acting); 1549	Succeeded by Semiz Ali Pasha as Governor
Preceded by Şemiz Ahmed Pasha	Grand Vizier of the Ottoman Empire; 28 April 1580 – 7 August 1580	Succeeded by Koca Sinan Pasha
