= Ivan Bespalov =

Ivan Mikhailovich Bespalov (1900, Smolino, Yekaterinburgsky Uyezd, Perm Province-26 November 1937, Moscow) was a Russian Soviet literary critic.

He became editor of Print and Revolution briefly in 1930, during which time the journal primarily showcased the work of the Litfront literary group before ceasing publication. He was editor of Khudozhestvennaya Literatura, (the State Publishing House of Fiction in the Soviet Union) from 1934 until July 1937.

== Repression and death ==
He was arrested on 26 July 1937 and charged with espionage and participation in an "anti-Soviet Trotskyist right-wing organisation". He was convicted and executed in Moscow on November 26, 1937. He was buried in the Donskoye Cemetery.
