= Aresh =

Aresh अरेश
- Village development committee
- Location in Nepal
- Coordinates: 28.20°N 82.76°E
- Country: Nepal
- Province: Lumbini Province
- District: Rolpa District

Population (1991)
  - Total: 2,801
- Time zone: UTC+5:45 (Nepal Time)

Aresh is a village development committee in Rolpa District in Lumbini Province of north-eastern Nepal. At the time of the 1991 Nepal census it had a population of 2801 people living in 497 individual households.
