= Shamkhalate =

Shamkhalate could refer to:

- Shamkhalate of Gazikumukh
- Shamkhalate of Tarki
