= Atalik =

Atalik and Atalık are surnames of Turkish origin. People with those names include:

- Ekaterina Atalik (born 1982), Russian-Turkish chess player
- Suat Atalık (born 1964), Turkish/Bosnian chess grandmaster

== See also ==
- Atalik Ghazi ('Champion Father'), a title of Yaqub Beg (1820–1877), adventurer of Tajik or Uzbek descent
