= Valerian Pereverzev =

Valerian Fedorovich Pereverzev (Russian: Валерьян Фёдорович Переверзев; 17 October 1882 – 5 May 1968) was a Soviet literary scholar and critic. He and his associates published the 1928 collection Literary Criticism, a controversial key text in what was called the "Pereverzev school."

Pereverzev was born in Bobrov (now Voronezh Oblast). He studied physics and mathematics at the University of Kharkov from 1901 to 1905 but was expelled and exiled to Narym for participating in revolutionary activities, being a member of RSDLP since 1905. In 1911 he returned to Moscow to study and lecture. After the October Revolution in 1917, Pereverzev worked as a teacher and scholar. In 1921 he became a professor at Moscow State University. His work examined the works of Nikolai Gogol, Fyodor Dostoevsky, and Ivan Goncharov. Pereverzev maintained that an author's style is determined by class milieu. He was a professor of the Institute of Red Professors and a member of the Communist Academy. Pereverzev was also a member of the editorial board of the Literary Encyclopedia.

During the Great purge, Pereverzev was suppressed and sentenced to exile in Kolyma. He was released in 1948 only to be arrested in the same year and exiled to Krasnoyarsk Krai. He returned to Moscow in 1956 and was finally rehabilitated and continued his literary activities.

Pereverzev died in Moscow and was buried at the Pyatnitskoye Cemetery.

== Selected publications ==
- Tvorchestvo Dostoevskogo (1928)
- Tvorchestvo Gogolia (1928)
- Literary Encyclopedia
- U istokov russkogo realisticheskogo romana (1965)
- Literatura drevnei Rusi (1971)
