= Publishing houses in the Soviet Union =

Publishing houses in the Soviet Union were a series of publishing enterprises which existed in the Soviet Union.

== Centralization ==
On 8 August 1930, the Sovnarkom of the Russian Soviet Federative Socialist Republic (RSFSR) established the state publishing monopoly, OGIZ (ОГИЗ, Объединение государственных книжно-журнальных издательств, Union of the State Book and Magazine Publishers), subordinated to Sovnarkom. At its core was the former Gosizdat. Other union republics followed the same pattern.

During the era of centralization the names of most publishers contained the acronym "гиз" ("giz") standing for "государственное издательство" (gosudarstvennoye izdatelstvo, i.e., "State Publisher", S.P.).

== List ==
=== Early publishers ===
As of 1 January 1930, there were 995 publishers in the RSFSR alone.

- «Новая Москва» (New Moscow)
- «Долой неграмотность» (Down with Illiteracy)
- «Прибой»
- «Всемирная литература» (Vsemirnaya literatura) (World Literature) (1919–1924)
- Nedra Publishers (1922–1931), literary publisher

=== Period of centralization ===
- Gosizdat (Госиздат) (State Publishing House)
- «Земля и фабрика» (Land and Factory)
- «Московский рабочий» (The Moscow Worker)
- «Молодая гвардия» (The Young Guard)
- «Советская энциклопедия» (Soviet Encyclopedia)
- «Работник просвещения» (The Worker for Enlightenment)
- Госмедиздат
- Госюриздат
- Госсельхозиздат (State Agriculture Publishing House)
- Госхимиздат
- «Безбожник» (The Atheist)
- «Academia»
- «Федерация» (Federation)
- «Недра» (Nedra)
- Центроиздат
- Издательство АН СССР (Publishing House of the Academy of Sciences of the USSR)
- Издательство Коммунистической академии (Publishing House of the Communist Academy)
- Издательство НКВД (Publishing House of the NKVD)
- Издательство Осоавиахима
- OGIZ
  - Detgiz (Детгиз) - stands for "State Publishing House for Children's Literature"
  - Sotsekgiz (Соцэкгиз, Изд-во социально-экономической литературы, Publisher for Social-Economic Literature) -
    - Renamed as Государственное издательство экономической литературы, State Publishing House of Economic Literature
  - Uchpedgiz (Учпедгиз) - stands for "State Publishing House of Student and Pedagogical Literature", turned into the Prosveshcheniye Publishing House
  - Масспартгиз
  - Гостехиздат (Gostekhizdat)
  - Сельколхозгиз
  - Медиздат
  - Государственное издательство художественной литературы - ГИХЛ (State Publishing House for Literary Works)
  - Юндетиздат
  - Военгиз
  - Музгиз
  - Юриздат
  - Изогиз
  - Словарно-энциклопедическое издательство (Lexicographic-Encyclopedic Publishing House)
  - Гострансиздат
  - Снабкоопгиз
  - Физкультура и туризм (Physical Culture and Tourism)
- Издательство партийной литературы (Партиздат) (Publishing House for Party Literature)
  - Renamed into Госполитиздат (Gospolitizdat)
- Государственное издательство физико-математической литературы (Fizmatgiz/Физматгиз)
- Наука (Nauka) (= Science)
- РИА Новости (RIA Novosti) - for news
- Издательство "Мир" (Mir (= world) Publishers)
- Издательство "Прогресс" (Progress Publishers)
- Государственное технико-теоретическое издательство GTTI/ГТТИ
- Spin-offs of Gostekhizdat
  - Государственное научно-техническое издательство Наркомтяжпрома (ГНТИ НКТП), later decentralized into the Объединение научно-технических издательств ONTI (ОНТИ) that included Государственное объединённое научно-техническое издательство GONTI (ГОНТИ):
    - Техтеоретиздат (Tehteoretizdat) aka Государственное издательство технико-теоретической литературы (Gosudarstvennoe Izdatel'stvo Tehniko-Teoretičeskoj Literatury (ГИТТЛ / GITTL)
    - Машметиздат
    - Химтехиздат
    - Энергоиздат
    - Стройиздат
    - etc.
  - Гизлегпром
  - Гослестехиздат

=== Perestroika publishers ===
- Книжная возврата (RKP)
- Fizmatlit (Izdatelstvo fiziko-matematicheskói i tejnicheskói literatury Физматли́т) (Изда́тельство фи́зико-математи́ческой и техни́ческой литерату́ры) (1990–1998)

== List of printing houses ==
- «Полиграфкнига» (Polygraph Book)
- «Полиграф» (Polygraph)
