= Nedra Publishers =

Russian specialty publisher

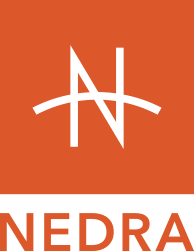
- Status: Active
- Founded: 1963
- Country of origin: Russia
- Headquarters location: Moscow, Russia
- Distribution: Worldwide
- Key people: Pavel A. Sobolev, Managing Director
- Publication types: Scientific and Technical Books and Magazines; scientific papers; Offshore Russia; Translations; Promotional and other publishing services
- Official website: www.nedrainform.ru

Nedra Publishers (Russian: Недра) is a Russian specialty publisher, focused primarily on the geosciences. It was founded in 1963 and is based in Moscow.

Nedra Publishers mainly issues textbooks, reference books, production and technical publications, scientific papers, and monographs, as well as scientific and popular literature, translated texts, posters, catalogs and other printed and digital materials.

== History ==
Nedra Publishers was founded in Moscow in 1963, via the union of four existing Russian publishers of technical literature: Gostoptekhizdat (Fuel Engineering Publishing House), Gosgortekhizdat (Mining Engineering Publishing House), Gosgeoltekhizdat (Geological Engineering Publishing House), and Geodezizdat (Geodesy Publishing House). At its height, Nedra Publishers produced over 1000 mining titles per year, with a print run of more than 21 million copies. According to the Great Soviet Encyclopedia, Nedra was the "scientific and technical publishing house" of the State Committee for Publishing of the Council of Ministers of the Soviet Union.

Throughout the 1960s and 1970s, Nedra Publishers focused exclusively on scientific, technical, educational, and reference literature covering the oil, gas, coal, and mining industries as well as the geosciences. It printed up to 15 scientific and technical journals of the USSR, among which were Sovetskaiageologiia (Soviet Geology), Gornyi zhurnal (Mining Journal), Neftianoe khoziaistvo (Petroleum Economy), Ugol' (Coal), and Torfianaiapromyshlennost' (Peat Industry). In 1973, Nedra had 600 titles, with 4.6 million copies in print – a total of 61 million printed pages. Mikhail Lvov ran Nedra from 1964 to 1987.

In 1979, Nedra was awarded the Order of the Badge of Honour for "outstanding achievements in production and scientific research" and for the "promotion of economic, scientific, and technological ties between the USSR and other countries".
