= Battle of Mollahasanli =

Battle between Safavid Iran and the Crimean Khanate

- Part of Ottoman–Safavid War (1578–1590)
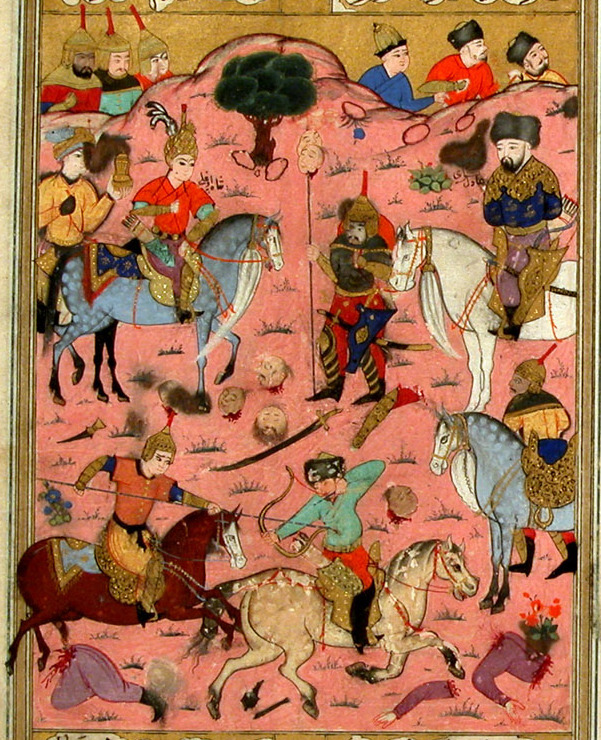
- In this 16th-century Ottoman miniature of Hamza Mirza (left, labelled شاه اوغلی Shah Oghli, "Son of the Shah"), receiving the surrender of Adil Giray.
Date	28 November 1578
Location	Pirgasanli village (present-day Agsu Rayon of Azerbaijan) 40°34′48″N 48°21′52″E
Result	Safavid victory: Most of Shirvan came under the control of the Safavids.

Belligerents
Safavid Iran	Crimean Khanate

Commanders and leaders
Hamza Mirza Safavi; Muhammed Khan Turkman; Muhammed Khan Ustajlu; Sharafaddin Takalu; Ismailgulu Khan Qajar	Adil Giray (POW)

Strength
20,000	15,000

Casualties and losses
Unknown	(Crimean Khanate) 2,000 captured

The Battle of Mollahasanli took place on 28 November 1578 during the Ottoman–Safavid War (1578–1590) in the town of Mollahasanli on the banks of the Agsu River in Shirvan. The Safavid army, under the command of the Crown Prince Hamza Mirza, defeated the army of the Ottoman ally, the Crimean Khan, under the command of the kalga Adil Giray. Adil Giray himself was captured.

== Background ==
By the mid-autumn of 1578, the Ottoman army occupied Tbilisi and captured Shirvan. Özdemiroğlu Osman Pasha was appointed Beylerbey of Shirvan with the ranks of Vizier and the title of Sardar. The post of beylerbey of Shirvan was dangerous due to the fact that the main part of the Ottoman army went to winter in Erzurum, and the task of defending the Ottoman conquests in Transcaucasia fell on the shoulders of the beylerbey of Shirvan, who had very limited forces. To gain a foothold in Shirvan, Osman Pasha must either conquer or defeat Aras Khan Rumlu, who previously ruled this region. Aras Khan managed to leave Shamakhi before the arrival of the Ottoman army and waited on the other bank of the Kura. For the beginning of the active operations, the action of the Crimean Khan played the role of a manoeuvrable cavalry in the Ottoman army. It was also known to the Safavids, therefore, an army of 12 thousand horsemen was sent to meet the Tatars, at the head of which was nominally the son of the Shah Muhammad Khudabanda, Hamza Mirza (a minor according to Pechevi, an 8-year-old according to Rahimzade). Osman Pasha planned to attack Aras Khan from two sides at the same time, however, he unexpectedly attacked first before the arrival of the Tatars and surrounded the city. Aras Khan hurried, because he knew about the approach of the main army with Hamza Mirza and his mother Mahd-i Ulya. The emirs of Shirvan feared the shah's displeasure for leaving Shirvan without any fight.

The battle for Shamakhi began on 9 November 1578 and lasted for several days. On the morning of the third day, the brother of the Crimean Khan, Adil Giray, at the head of 15 thousand Tatar horsemen, came to the aid of the Ottomans, this decided the outcome of the battle and the Safavids were defeated. Aras Khan and his son were taken prisoners by the mirakhur Adil Giray and were executed. The losses on both sides were enormous.

== Raid on Aras Khan's camp ==
Osman Pasha rewarded the Tatars and arranged a three-day feast for them, but the reward seemed insufficient to Adil, or he simply did not mind robbing. Adil Giray and the appointed Aresha Piyale-bey by the sanjakbey decided to attack the camp of Aras Khan. Having learned from the survivors of the battle and fled Qizilbashs that the horde of Tatars headed towards the camp, Hamza Mirza ordered the emirs to hurry towards the camp, guard it and organize patrols along the river. The Talysh emirs guarded the bridge in Javad (influenced by the Aras and Kura) for the passage of Qizilbash soldiers retreating from Shamakhi. While patrolling the banks of the river, they received news of the Adil Giray's approach. The emirs immediately blocked the bridge, but the Tatar cavalry rushed into the water, swam across the river and got into a fight.

At this time, the Safavid emirs learned that another detachment crossed the river in another place and attacked their rearward. In disorder, they retreated to the camp, causing panic. Those in the camp did not have time to escape when the Tatars attacked them. Capturing women and children, plundering supplies, Adil Giray on the same day withdrew across the river with his booty and returned to Shirvan. All historians noted that the Tatars suddenly attacked the camp and captured a huge number of trophies. “The treasury of Eresh Khan, 70 of his beautiful daughters and wives, and about 50 of his beautiful concubines were captured, and his young son was captured too”. The contemporaries of these events (Ibrahim Rahimizadeh, Mustafa Ali Gelibolulu and Dal Mekhmed Asafi) condemned the attack and the robbery because they took place in the month of Ramadan. Pechevi argued that the Tatars did not launch the raid on the camp on their own initiative; the historian stated that Osman Pasha sent the Tatars to destroy the Aras Khan camp.

== Battle ==
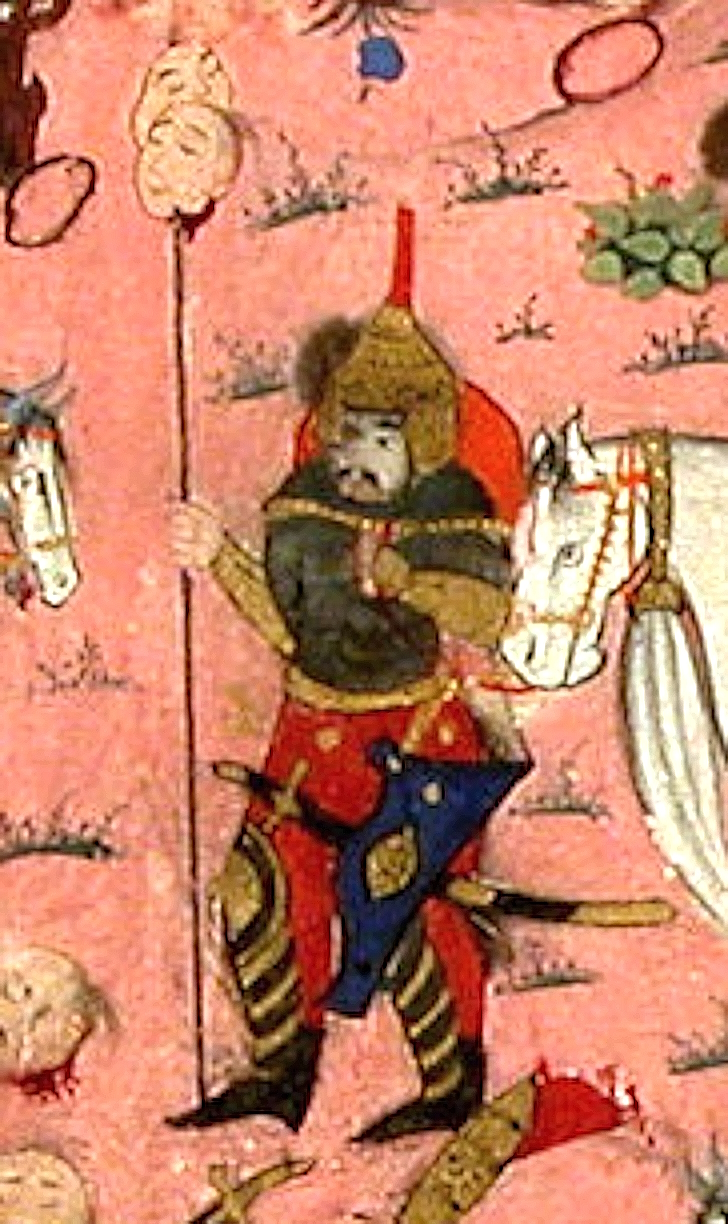
Safavid heavy Qizilbash soldier, at the Battle of Mollahasanli. Şeca'atname (1598)

The Safavids gathered an army led by the heir to the throne Hamza Mirza, however, in fact, the vizier of the Shah Muhammad Khudabanda, Mirza Salman, commanded. According to Oruj-bek, this was the same army that took Aresh. According to the Ottoman sources, the size of the enemy army ranged from 50 to 100 thousand people. Mirza Salman crossed the Kura, on 26 November 1578, and approached Shamakhi and besieged the city for three days. Osman Pasha sent a letter to Adil Giray, asking him to abandon the booty and come to Shamakhi, but it was intercepted, and Mirza Salman decided to go to meet the Tatars. Leaving part of the army to continue the siege, Mirza Salman led 20,000 troops, along with emirs, among whom were Mohammed Khan Turkman, Mohammed Khan Ustajlu, the grandson of Durmish Khan Shamlu, Sharaf ad-Din Tekkelu, Imamgulu Khan Qajar and others, and went to meet the Tatars. Adil Giray moved to Shamakhi and on 28 November 1578, near the Agsu River, at Mollahasanli, he faced Mirza Salman in battle.

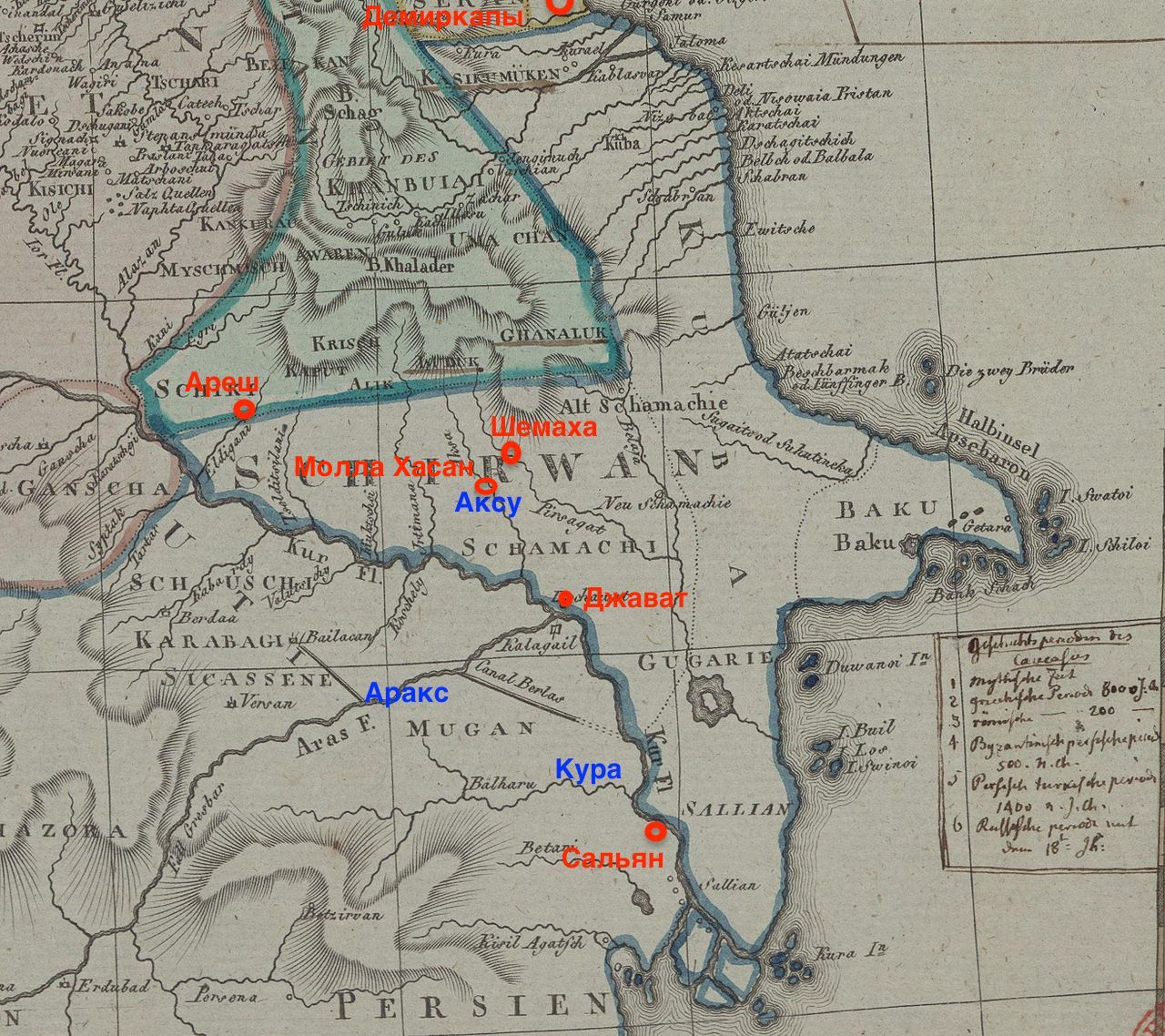
Map of Shirvan

According to Oruj-bek and Sharaf-khan, Mirza Salman attacked Adil Giray who was imprudent in choosing the place for the camp and did not post sentries. In total, Adil Giray had 12,000 Tatars and four to five thousand Lezgins. The Tatar army was dispersed, as each dragged and guarded their prey, and for Adil Giray only about 2,000 guards remained. The Tatar prince carelessly got indulged in amusements and entertainment and, according to Rahimizadeh "was blinded by the beauty of his captives", therefore he was unable to organize a rebuff in the battle that had begun.

The first to attack the Tatars were the advanced units of the Safavid army under the commandment of Hamza Khan Ustajlu.

The descriptions of the battle vary. According to Iskandar Beg Munshi and Sharaf-khan, the Tatars courageously resisted, the battle lasted all day, while according to Oruj-bek: the Safavids acted quickly, and when the Tatars came to their senses from the attack, more than a half of them were killed, and Adil Giray had already been taken prisoner. According to Ibrahim Pechevi: “The endless rain pouring down from heaven did not give them the opportunity to act with their hands and feet, and the enemy masses surrounded them from all sides”. Historians call the arrogance and carelessness as reason for the defeat of the Tatars.

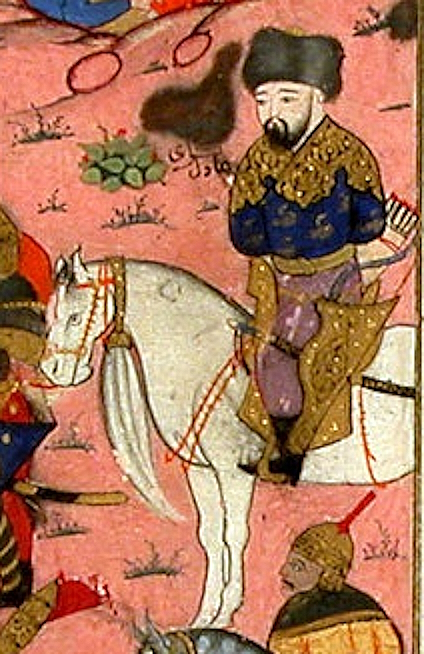
Crimean Khanate commander Adil Giray Khan, brother of Mehmed II Giray, captured by the Safavids in Shirvan in November 1587. Şeca'atname (1598)

According to Ibrahim Rahimizadeh, Adil Giray himself "like an angry lion rushed into battle". The Safavid warrior named Baba Kalifa Dankaralu threw the Tatar leader off his horse with a spear and wanted to kill him, but Adil Giray gave his name and was captured. Left without a leader, the Tatars fled and many of them were killed. The Lezgins and Shirvans, familiar with the area, managed to escape. When the victors saw the rich booty, they abandoned the pursuit of the Tatars. Almost everything that the Tatars seized in the Aras Khan camp ended up in the hands of the victors at Mollahasanli. About 30 noble Tatars and 2,000 ordinary soldiers were captured. The Ottoman sanjak-bey Aresha Piyale-bey, was also captured.

== Aftermath ==
The Ottoman troops were in a depressed state. Osman Pasha hid the news of the defeat of the Tatars and announced their victory. To give credibility to the story, he ordered to fire the cannons, but the truth was revealed and the soldiers began to massively desert.

The Qizilbash army from Shamakhi went to Aresh. After the murder of the Ottoman commanders and the burning of the Aresh fortress, the Safavid army returned to Karabakh. Most of Shirvan came under the control of the Safavids. However, they failed to consolidate their successes.

== Sources ==
- Don Juan of Persia (2007). Россия и Европа глазами Орудж-бека Баята - Дон Жуана Персидского / Oktay Afandiyev and Farzaliyev Akif. Sankt-Peterburg: Saint Petersburg State University.
- İbrahim Peçevi (1988). История / Ziya Bunyadov. Baku: Elm.
- Фарах Гусейн (2005). Османо-Сефевидская война 1578 - 1590 гг.: по материалам трудов османского летописца Ибрахима Рахимизаде. Baku: Nurlan.
- Sharafkhan Bidlisi (1967). Шараф-наме / E. I. Vasilyeva. Moscow: Nauka.
- Iskandar Beg Munshi. History Of Shah Abbas The Great Vol. 1 / Roger M. Savory. — Boulder, Colorado: Westview Press, 1930. (1930). History Of Shah Abbas The Great Vol. 1 / Roger M. Savory. Colorado: Westview Press.
- Купели Озер (2014). Походы крымских татар и турок-осман против Ирана. Золотоордынское обозрение.
- Çiçek Kemal (2007). Osman Paşa, Özdemiroğlu // Islam ansiklopedisi.
- Farah Hüseyn (2019). Farah Hüseyn. 1578-1590 Osmanlı-Safevî Savaşı ve Kırım Hanlığı (Османо-сефевидская война 1578-1590-х гг. и Крымское ханство). Akademik Tarih ve Düşünce Dergisi.
- Kütükoğlu Bekir (1962). Osmanli-Iran Siyâsî münâsebetleri. Edebiyat Fakültesi Matbaasi.
