= Hamza Mirza =

Safavid Crown Prince (1568–1586)

Hamza Mirza حمزه میرزا
- Mirza
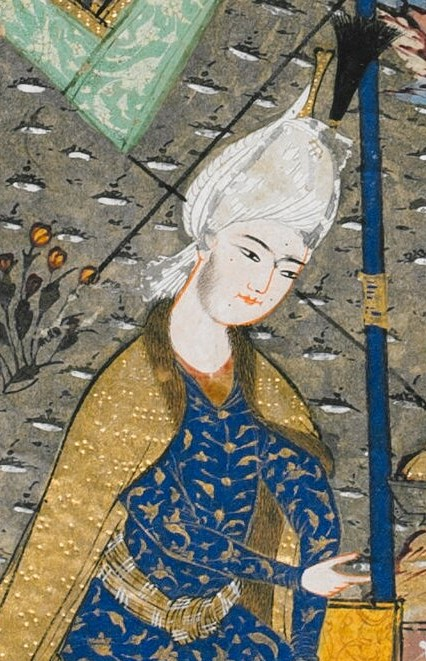

Safavid Crown Prince
- Tenure: 11 February 1578 - 6 December 1586
- Successor: Abu Talib Mirza
- Shah: Mohammad Khodabanda
- Born: 4 September 1568; Herat, Safavid Iran
- Died: 6 December 1586 (aged 18); Qarabagh, Safavid Iran
- Burial: Ardabil
- Issue: Ismail Mirza; Haydar Mirza
- Dynasty: Safavid
- Father: Mohammad Khodabanda
- Mother: Khayr al-Nisa Begum
- Religion: Twelver Shia Islam
- Military career
- Conflicts: Ottoman–Safavid War of 1578–1590; Battle of Mollahasanli; Battle of Torhces

Hamza Mirza (Persian: حمزه میرزا, romanized: Ḥamzā Mīrzā; 4 September 1568 – 6 December 1586) was the Safavid crown prince of Iran during the reign of his father Mohammad Khodabanda (r. 1578–1587). His mother was Khayr al-Nisa Begum, a Mar'ashi princess from Mazandaran.

== Biography ==
He was born on 4 September 1568 (11 Rabi al-Awwal AH 976) in Herat, and was named after Muhammad's uncle Hamza. He was appointed as governor of Herat by his grandfather Tahmasp I in 1573. However, due to his father's complaints, Hamza was relocated to Shiraz and was replaced by his infant brother Abbas.

Ismail II ordered the executions of his brother and nephews in 1577, but died before the order could be carried out, after which his brother Mohammad Khodabanda ascended the throne. Hamza was officially created crown prince, at the behest of his mother in February 1578. Turkmen and Takalu emirs played a significant role on his appointment and became his main supporters. He followed his mother to Karabakh after the battle of Çıldır in 1578.

Following his mother's murder on 26 July 1579, Hamza became a central figure in the conflict between Ali-Qoli Khan Shamlu and his Shamlu–Ustajlu coalition, who favoured young Abbas against the reigning shah, Mohammad Khodabanda. Mirza Salman Jaberi, his mother's supporter, managed to have Hamza Mirza's vizier Hossein Beg Shamlu dismissed and took over the office himself in August 1580. Meanwhile, the sides came to an understanding only after 1581 and accepted Hamza as crown prince. In 1585, the gholam (slave-soldier) Farhad Beg was appointed as Hamza Mirza's main deputy.

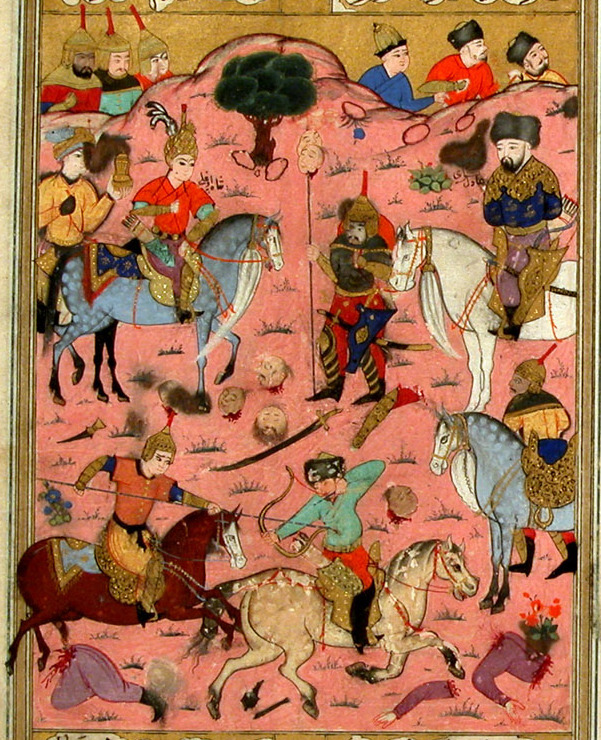
Hamza Mirza (left, labelled شاه اوغلی Shah Oghli, "Son of the Shah"), receiving the surrender of the Crimean Khanate general Adil Giray at the Battle of Mollahasanli in 1578. Ottoman miniature (Secaatname, 1586).

Hamza Mirza was part of the Safavid army when the Ottomans attacked Tabriz in 1585. However, the assassination of Amir Khan Mawsillu-Turkman, the governor of Azerbaijan province, allegedly on the orders of Hamza Mirza caused a rift among the Qizilbash tribes. According to Hamza, Amir Khan obstructed his efforts to identify those responsible for his mother's murder.

Upon learning of the Ottoman forces nearing Tabriz, Hamza Mirza requested help from the Takalu and Turkman tribes. However, many of the prominent commanders, such as Mohammad Khan Turkoman (governor of Kashan), Vali Khan Takalu (governor of Hamadan), and Masib Khan Sharaf al-Din Oghli Takalu (governor of Ray), who were resentful over the killing of Amir Khan, refused to obey his command and started an open rebellion in support of his younger brother Tahmasp Mirza on 21 February 1586. However, the rebellion was suppressed and Tahmasp Mirza was imprisoned in Alamut on 23 May 1586.

== Death ==
Worried that Hamza Mirza would take revenge for his mother's murder, the Qizilbash resolved to have the crown prince assassinated. He was stabbed to death in Karabakh on the night of 6 December 1586 in his camp by Khodi, his personal barber, and was buried in Ardabil, after which the murderer was promptly executed. After Hamza Mirza's death, the Ottoman army easily took Tabriz, and his younger brother Abu Talib Mirza was appointed as the Safavid crown prince by the Qizilbash emirs.

== Family ==
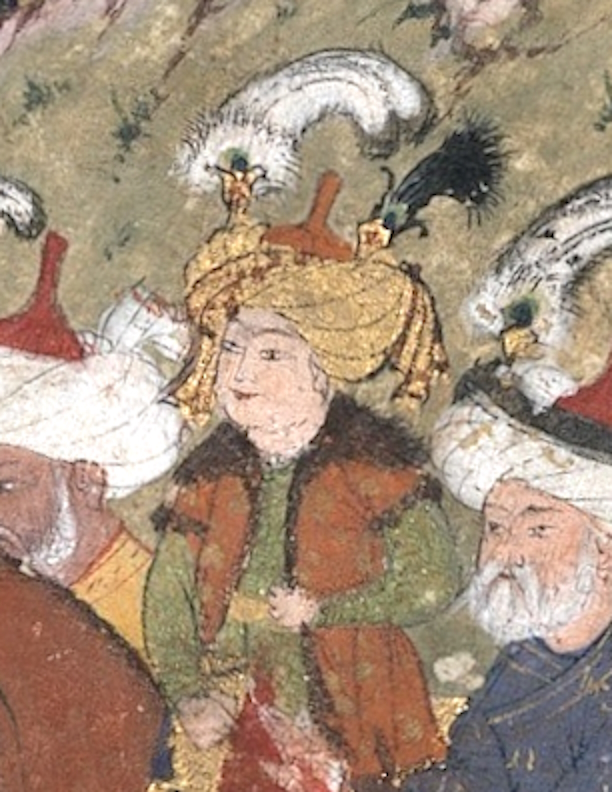
Entrance of Safavid Prince Haydar Mirza, son of Hamza Mirza, in Constantinople as a hostage in 1590. Divan of Mahmud Abd al-Baki, 1590–95.

Hamza Mirza initially married Oghlan Pasha Khanum, daughter of Soltan Hosayn Mirza and granddaughter of Bahram Mirza in 1578. Hamza Mirza, upon the advice of Mirza Salman Jaberi, married Tinatina, daughter of Alexander II of Kakheti in 1579 and Fakhrijan-Begum, daughter of Simon I of Kartli in 1582. Later in April 1582, Mirza Salman Jaberi, seeking closer ties to the royal family, married his own daughter Safiya Begum to Hamza Mirza.

According to Antonio de Gouvea, who quoted Simão de Moraes, Augustinian missionary stationed in Hormuz, Tinatina once convinced Hamza to convert to Christianity when he was gravely ill. However, according to Gouvea, this story was forged by an Armenian priest who met de Moraes. De Gouvea further claimed that Abbas told him that Hamza greatly favoured Christianity.

His son, Ismail Mirza, was sent to Alamut upon Abbas's accession to the throne and was blinded in 1591. His younger son Haydar Mirza was sent as a hostage to the Ottoman court in 1590 in order to secure the Treaty of Constantinople (1590) and seal the end of the Ottoman–Safavid War (1578–1590), but he died there in 1596.
