= Abu Talib Mirza =

Safavid Crown Prince
- Tenure: 6 December 1586 - 1 October 1587
- Successor: Abbas the Great
- Shah: Mohammad Khodabanda
- Born: 1574; Shiraz, Safavid Iran
- Died: 1619 (aged 44–45); Alamut Castle, Safavid Iran
- Dynasty: Safavid
- Father: Mohammad Khodabanda
- Mother: Khayr al-Nisa Begum
- Religion: Twelver Shia Islam

Abu Talib Mirza (Persian: ابوطالب میرزا, romanized: Abū Ṭāleb Mīrzā) was the fourth son of Shah Mohammad Khodabanda from his wife Khayr al-Nisa Begum.

== Biography ==
He was born in 1574, Shiraz as fourth son of Mohammad Khudabanda. After the assassination of Hamza Mirza in 1586, Qizilbash commanders Fath Oglu Ustajlu and Ismayil Qoli Khan Shamlu in the west selected Abu Talib Mirza as the crown prince as Mohammad Khudabanda was a blind ruler and was seen weak.

Meanwhile, in the east Murshid Qoli Khan Ustajlu raised Abbas his own candidate, seizing him from Ali-Qoli Khan Shamlu. During the first ten days of Ramadan 1586, Abbas, his new guardian and a small escort of not more than a few hundred horsemen, started to ride towards Qazvin. As they rode along the Silk Road, Qizilbash amirs from the powerful Takalu, Afshar and Dulkadir tribes, who controlled many of the key towns on the way, came to pledge their allegiance. By the time they approached Qazvin, their small force had increased to 2,000 armed horsemen.

When the news arrived that Abbas Mirza and his entourage had passed through Shahrud, Mohammad Khodabanda, Abu Talib Mirza, and their supporters went to Isfahan, intending to confront Abbas there and, if necessary, later in Shiraz. The lord mayor of Qazvin and the Qizilbash emirs inside the city at first urged resistance ro Abbas. But they gave up when crowds of citizens and soldiers, anxious to avoid fighting, came out onto the streets and voiced their support for Abbas, who rode into the capital beside Murshid Qoli Khan in late-September 1587. Two or three days later, the Takalu and Turkoman arrived in the capital with Tahmasp Mirza, declared their loyalty to Abbas, and joined his forces.

When Abbas captured Qazvin and ascended to the throne, Ustajlu and Shamlu tribes who were encamped near Qom, along with Abu Talib Mirza and Shah Mohammad Khodabanda changed sides and fled. Khodabanda now had no choice but to return to Qazvin with Abu Talib Mirza and plead for clemency for his younger son from his elder brother. Abbas Mirza, accompanied by a small group, went approximately 36 kilometers out of the city to meet his father, kissed his hand, embraced Abu Talib, and escorted them back to the capital in a royal procession. Soon Mohammad resigned and handed the throne over to Abbas. Abu Talib was sent to Alamut Fortress, where his brother Tahmasp Mirza was also imprisoned.

In the third year of Shah Abbas's reign, in 1591 CE, Abu Talib Mirza, his brother Tahmasp Mirza, Ismail Mirza (the son of Hamza Mirza), and Sultan Ali Mirza (9th son of Tahmasp I) were transferred to Tabreh Castle, where all the princes were blinded and then returned to Alamut. Eventually, Abu Talib Mirza died in 1619.
