= Farhad Beg (gholam) =

Farhad Beg (Persian: فرهاد بیگ: died 1589) was an administrator in Safavid Iran during the reign of Shah Tahmasp I (r. 1524–1576), Shah Mohammad Khodabanda (r. 1578–1587) and Shah Abbas I (r. 1588–1629).

Coming from the recently incorporated Georgian and Circassian elements, Farhad Beg was a member of the gholam corps. During the final years of Tahmasp I's reign, he served as the main administrator of the imperial household. In 1585, he was appointed as the main deputy for Hamza Mirza, a son of Mohammad Khodabanda. Using material salvaged from a palace belonging to Shah Ismail I (r. 1501–1524), Farhad Beg established a large personal mansion within the Naqsh-e Jahan Square of Isfahan.

During this period, the success of officials like Farhad Beg rose and fell in direct correlation with the influence of their patrons. After Hamza Mirza's murder in 1586, Farhad was imprisoned and his mansion was raided by the Afshar soldiers of Mohammad Khodabanda.

After Abbas I became the new shah in 1587, Farhad Beg entered into the service of the latters main supporter, Morshed Qoli Khan Ustajlu. After Abbas I had Morshed Qoli Khan killed in 1589, Farhad Beg was imprisoned and his property was seized. He was soon killed by poison. By 1598, his mansion had been transformed into a palace.

== Sources ==
- Floor, Willem (2021). "The Safavid court and government". In Matthee, Rudi (ed.). The Safavid World. Routledge. pp. 203–223. ISBN 978-1138944060.
- Newman, Andrew J. (2008). Safavid Iran: Rebirth of a Persian Empire. I.B.Tauris. ISBN 978-0857716613.
