= Gholaman-e khasseh-ye sharifeh =

Elite slave soldiers, courtiers, bureaucrats in Safavid Iran

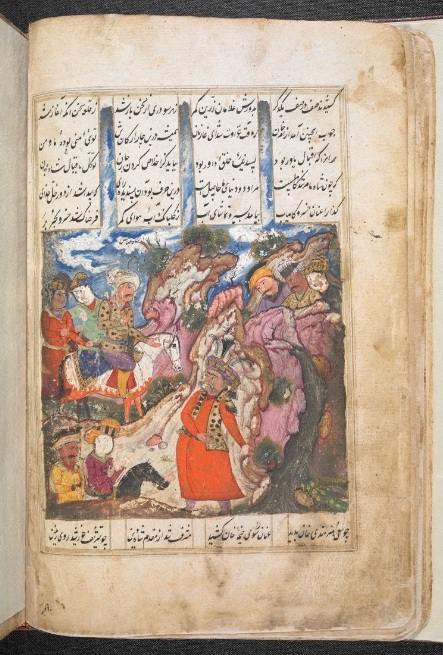
Shah Abbas I with the gholam Emamqoli Khan, dated 1697

Gholaman-e khasseh-ye sharifeh (Persian: غلامان خاصه شریفه, lit. 'Royal Household Slaves'), commonly referred to as gholams, were an elite corps of slave soldiers, courtiers, and bureaucrats in Safavid Iran. It was mostly made up of Shia converts of Georgian, Armenian and Circassian origin.

This concept was introduced during the reign of Shah Tahmasp I (r. 1524–1576), but first established in its definitive form by Shah Abbas I (r. 1588–1629). The 17th-century Safavid political landscape was defined by three distinct factions: the Persian administrative and religious elite, the Turkic Qizilbash military, and the newly established Caucasian gholams. This "Third Force" became the primary political and military authority until the collapse of the Safavid government in 1722.

In 1627, 21 of the 92 powerful emirs were gholams. They controlled 8 of 14 key provinces at the end of Shah Abbas I's reign. This figure dropped to 3 out of 11 under Shah Safi (r. 1629–1642), before rising again under Shah Abbas II (r. 1642–1666) to levels similar to those under Shah Abbas I. The gholams generally held the qollar-aghasi (commander of the gholams) office and, increasingly, that of the sepahsalar (commander-in-chief). In contrast to the Ottoman system, Safavid slaves could pass their positions down to their offspring.

The use of slaves started to decline in 19th century Iran. While the Qajar ruler Fath-Ali Shah (r. 1797–1834) still had gholams in his royal bodyguard, Russian expansionism necessitated a transition from these to a modernized professional army.

== Terminology ==
According to the Iranologist Rudi Matthee, "The term ghulams is often translated as slaves (of the shah), but, since not all of them were originally Caucasian slaves, they might more appropriately be called servants of the shah." In Safavid writings, "gholam" could also refer to one loyal to the royal Safavid family rather than a slave of them.

== Legal status and privileges ==
The Islamic model of slavery generally focused on military slavery and domestic slavery. In this context, religion served as the primary justification for enslavement rather than ethnicity. The legal process encouraged the conversion and manumission of enslaved non-Muslims. This distinction allowed for significant social advancement, where former slaves frequently gained powerful positions as generals, governors, viziers or monarchs.

The template for Islamic slavery was the manumission and adoption of Zayd ibn Haritha al-Kalbi as a Muslim son by the Islamic prophet Muhammad. Muslims copied this behavior to obtain religious rewards. Through conversion, enslaved persons were incorporated into the Muslim community and often into domestic roles as adopted children or concubines. The master possessed total physical and legal control which often resulted in the abuse of those in their possession. However, the domestic nature of the practice also created close connections with the master's family. These personal relationships often continued after the slave had been freed.

Under the Safavids, enslaved individuals could inherit the positions held by their fathers, which distinguished them from their counterparts in the Ottoman Empire. This practice led to the development of specific Safavid factions organized around elite slave families. The governorship of Lar and Kong (from 1640), as well as Bandar Abbas (from 1668) was more or less held by the gholam family of Evaz Beg until the fall of the Safavid dynasty. To reinforce their legitimacy and associate themselves with ancient Iranian glory, the Safavids gave their personal slaves names of pre-Islamic figures found in the Shahnameh.

Highly capable and loyal gholams including Qarachaqay Khan rose to elite positions and enjoyed direct proximity to the shah. These gholams resided near the royal court in Isfahan and joined the shah during military operations as well as leisure activities like hunting and formal receptions. Paintings from the Safavid and Mughal periods illustrate the close friendship between the shah and these high ranking slaves. While the Imam Reza shrine in Mashhad was a cemetery specifically for the royal Safavid family, exceptions were made for prominent slaves. Allahverdi Khan and Qarachaqay Khan with his son were buried in this shrine as a sign of their elevated status.

== Composition ==
Most gholams were Shia converts of Georgian, Armenian and Circassian origin. Both Persian-language and European writings suggest that the Georgians were the most prevalent element within the gholam corps. Slaves used their shared heritage to work together or to outmaneuver one another in the pursuit of political favor. Success depended on getting close to the primary authorities in household politics, such as the shah, his mother or the chief eunuchs.

Although the shah could in rare cases raise more than 100,000 soldiers, the usual number was between 10,000–40,000. In 1618 there were approximately 30,000 gholams of whom 15,000 served in the army. Subsequent estimates of the gholam population fluctuated between 8,000–14,000 individuals. By 1684 there were approximately 15,000–18,000 gholams.

== History ==
=== Establishment under Tahmasp I (1524–1576) ===
Prominent families across the Islamic world frequently utilized domestic slavery. Both Shah Ismail I (r. 1501–1524) and Shah Tahmasp I (r. 1524–1576) employed household slaves as evidenced by early mentions of slaves attached to the Safavid family in historical chronicles. The concept of the gholams was first introduced during the reign of Tahmasp I.

To address the risk of uprisings by his family members, Tahmasp I frequently rotated his brothers and sons among various provincial governorships throughout the realm. However, in order to have enduring stability he needed to curb the overall military and political power of the Qizilbash. This strategy followed the precedent set by his father who placed distinguished Persians as Najm-e Sani into high ranking bureaucratic offices. Tahmasp I maintained this approach through his close friendship with the grand vizier and vakil Qadi Jahan Qazvini from 1535 onward. Although Persians successfully maintained their positions as the state's administrators and religious authorities, the military influence of the Qizilbash remained strong.

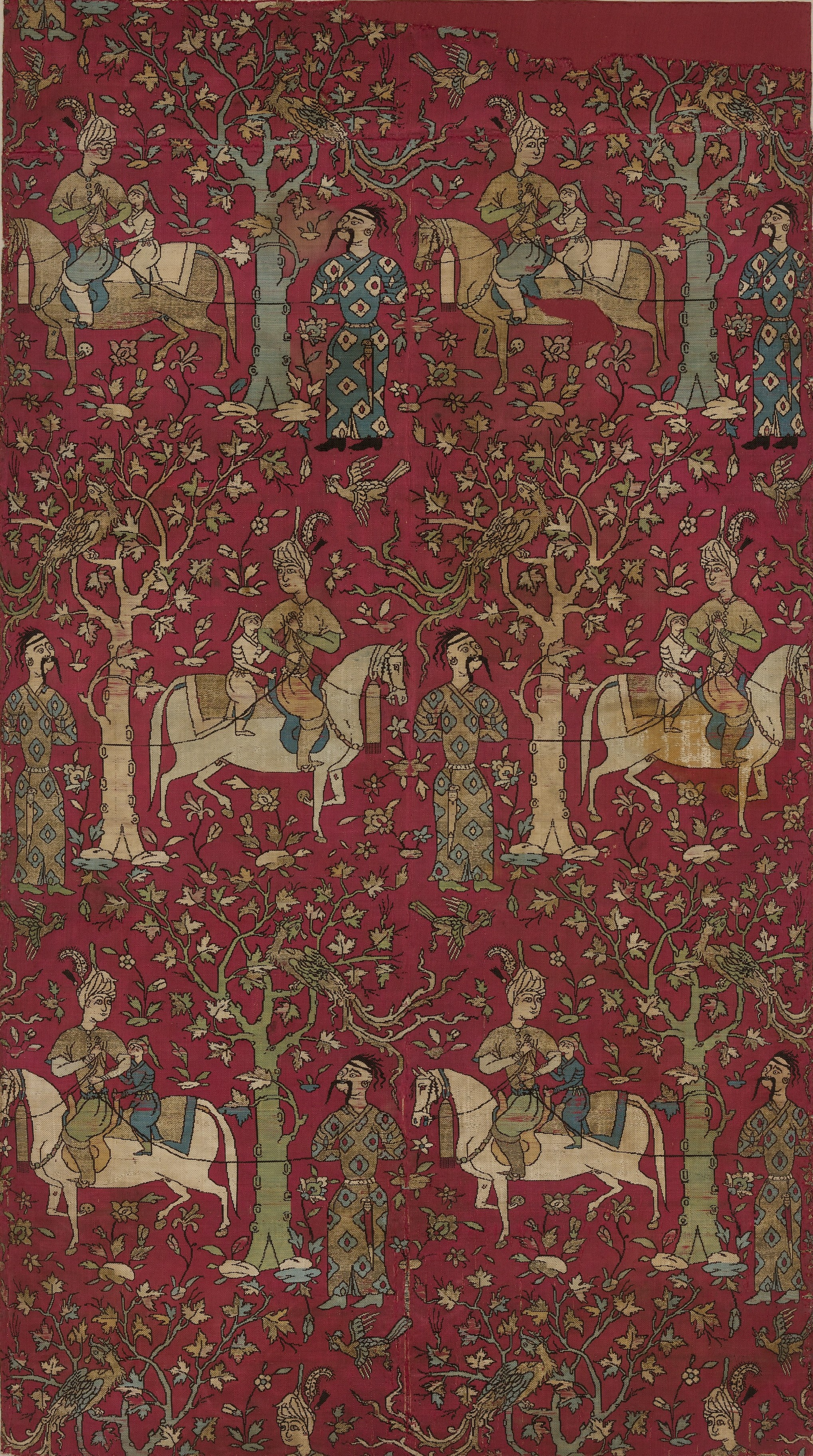
Safavid courtiers leading Georgian captives. A mid-16th century Persian textile panel from the Metropolitan Museum of Art

To address this, Tahmasp I began the first of several organized incursions into the Caucasus which resulted in the acquisition of vast wealth and a large population of Christian captives. Following the fourth incursion in 1553 he demonstrated that he intended to annex territory and resettle the conquered locals. He successfully incorporated the Kingdom of Kartli and the city of Tbilisi into his realm and had more than 30,000 of its residents (mostly women and children) resettled to the central Iranian plateau. This marked the beginning of the gholam corps who would later establish their supremacy over the Safavid military throughout the late 16th and early 17th centuries.

Due to an upbringing marred by Qizilbash power struggles, Tahmasp I preferred the gholams because of their lack of tribal ties and family responsibilities. Numerous women from these displaced populations were integrated into the royal household as the wives and concubines of Tahmasp I. Their arrival turned the Safavid imperial harem into a competitive environment fueled by ethnic power struggles. Groups of Turkmen, Circassian, and Georgian women and courtiers frequently attempted to win the favor of the shah. Tahmasp I had four known Georgian wives; Soltanzadeh Khanum, Zahra Baji, Huri Khan Khanum and a sister of Waraza Shalikashvili.

The gholam Farhad Beg served as the main administrator of the imperial household during the final years of Tahmasp I's reign. In 1585, he was appointed as the main deputy for Hamza Mirza, a son of Mohammad Khodabanda (r. 1578–1587). Using material salvaged from a palace belonging to Ismail I, Farhad Beg established a large personal mansion within the Naqsh-e Jahan Square of Isfahan.

=== Centralization of the gholam system under Abbas I (1588–1629) ===
The gholam was first established in its definitive form by Shah Abbas I (r. 1588–1629). According to the Iranologist Abbas Amanat; "Similar to the Ottoman Janissaries, the introduction of the gholam recruits injected fresh blood into the Safavid army, with more loyalty to the person of the shah. It can even be argued that the gholam element made it possible for the Safavids to recapture their lost western provinces."

A fundamental change in the Safavid administration coincided with the rise of Isfahan as the capital. The government shifted from placing princes in provinces under Qizilbash supervision to keeping them within the court in Isfahan. Eunuchs took over the responsibilities of the Qizilbash tutors and served as loyal household attendants. This ended the Qizilbash practice of using royal heirs as political tools to challenge the authority of the shah.

The evolution of the Safavid royal household coincided with the transformation of state lands (mamalek) into crown property (khasseh). Previously, Qizilbash governors exercised significant authority over the financial and military affairs of their governed provinces. These officials remained financially independent of the royal treasury because they were given land (toyul). In exchange for this, they provided the shah with military forces and supplies for warfare. Abbas I started to alter this structure by appointing gholams to replace Qizilbash governors. This change enabled the shah to transform state lands into crown property.

== Sources ==
- Amanat, Abbas (2017). Iran: A Modern History. Yale University Press. ISBN 978-0300112542.
- Bosworth, Clifford Edmund (1988). "Barda and Barda-Dāri v. Military slavery in Islamic Iran". In Yarshater, Ehsan (ed.). Encyclopædia Iranica (Online ed.). Encyclopædia Iranica Foundation. ISBN 978-0710091215.
- Babaie, Sussan; Babayan, Kathryn; Baghdiantz-McCabe, Ina; Farhad, Massumeh (2004). Slaves of the Shah: New Elites of Safavid Iran. I.B. Tauris. ISBN 978-1860647215.
- Floor, Willem (2001). Safavid Government Institutions. Mazda Publishers. ISBN 978-1568591353.
- Floor, Willem (2021). "The Safavid court and government". In Matthee, Rudi (ed.). The Safavid World. Routledge. pp. 203–223. ISBN 978-1138944060.
- Maeda, Maeda (2021). "Against all odds: the Safavids and the Georgians". In Matthee, Rudi (ed.). The Safavid World. Routledge. pp. 125–143. ISBN 978-1138944060.
- Matthee, Rudi (2011). Persia in Crisis: Safavid Decline and the Fall of Isfahan. I.B. Tauris. ISBN 978-0857731814.
- Mitchell, Colin Paul (2009). "Ṭahmāsp I". In Yarshater, Ehsan (ed.). Encyclopædia Iranica (Online ed.). Encyclopædia Iranica Foundation. ISBN 978-1934283288.
- Mitchell, Colin P. (2011). New Perspectives on Safavid Iran: Empire and Society. Routledge. ISBN 978-0415774628.
- Mitchell, Colin (2021). "Custodial politics and princely governance in sixteenth-century Safavid Iran". In Matthee, Rudi (ed.). The Safavid World. Routledge. pp. 79–110. ISBN 978-1138944060.
- Newman, Andrew J. (2008). Safavid Iran: Rebirth of a Persian Empire. I.B. Tauris. ISBN 978-0857716613.
- Savory, Roger M. (2007). Iran Under the Safavids. Cambridge University Press. ISBN 978-0521042512.
- Szuppe, Maria (2003). "Status, knowledge, and politics : women in Sixteenth-Century Safavid Iran". In Nashat, Guity (ed.). Women in Iran from the Rise of Islam to 1800. University of Illinois Press. pp. 140–170. ISBN 978-0252071218.
