= Mohammad Khodabanda =

Safavid Shah of Iran from 1578 to 1587

Mohammad Khodabanda محمد خدابنده
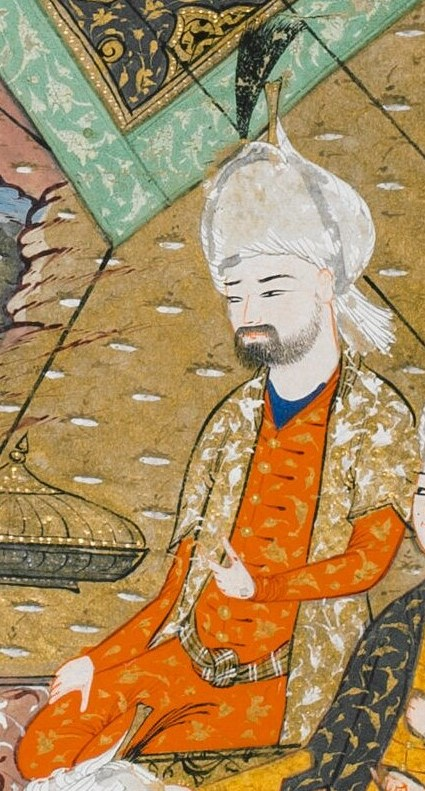
- Mohammad Khodabanda (detail) by Ahmad Monshi Qomi, Kholāsat al-tavārikh, c. 17th-century

Shah of Iran
- Reign: 11 February 1578 – October 1587
- Predecessor: Ismail II
- Successor: Abbas I
- Born: 1532; Tabriz, Safavid Iran
- Died: 1595 (aged 64); Qazvin, Safavid Iran
- Burial: Imam Husayn Shrine, Karbala, Iraq
- Consort: Khayr al-Nisa Begum
- Issue: Hamza Mirza; Abu Talib Mirza; Abbas I; Hasan Mirza; Tahmasp Mirza; Shah Begum
Names
- Mohammad Khodabandeh
- Dynasty: Safavid
- Father: Tahmasp I
- Mother: Sultanum Begum
- Religion: Twelver Shia Islam

Mohammad Khodabanda (also spelled Khodabandeh; Persian: محمد خدابنده, born 1532; died 1595 or 1596) was the fourth Safavid shah of Iran from 1578 until his overthrow in 1587 by his son Abbas I. Khodabanda had succeeded his brother, Ismail II. Khodabanda was the son of Shah Tahmasp I by a mother from the Turcoman Mawsillu clan of the Aq Qoyunlu confederation, Sultanum Begum Mawsillu, and a grandson of Ismail I, founder of the Safavid dynasty. After the death of his father in 1576, Khodabanda was passed over in favour of his younger brother Ismail II. Khodabanda had an eye affliction that rendered him nearly blind, and so in accordance with Persian royal culture he could not contend for the throne. However, following Ismail II's short and bloody reign Khodabanda emerged as the only heir and became Shah in 1578 with the backing of the Qizilbash tribes.

Khodabanda's reign was marked by a continued weakness of the crown and tribal infighting as part of the second civil war of the Safavid era. An important figure in the early years of Khodabanda's reign was his wife Khayr al-Nisa Begum, who helped secure her husband's reign. However, her efforts to consolidate central power brought about opposition from the powerful Qizilbash tribes, who had her murdered in 1579. Khodabanda has been described as "a man of refined tastes but weak character". As a result, Khodabanda's reign was characterised by factionalism, with major tribes aligning themselves with Khodabanda's sons and future heirs. This internal chaos allowed foreign powers, especially the rivalling and neighboring Ottoman Empire, to make territorial gains, including the conquest of the old capital of Tabriz in 1585. Khodabanda was finally overthrown in a coup in favour of his son Shah Abbas I.

== Early life ==
Born as Soltan-Mohammad Mirza in Tabriz, he was named titular governor of Herat at the age of four, shortly after the city was recovered from the Uzbeks in 1537. The real power was his lala (tutor-mentor), the Qizilbash amir Muhammad Sharaf al-Din Oghli Takkalu, who was responsible for the massive public works in the 1540s which brought irrigations complexes, gardens, shrines and other public buildings to Herat. These efforts met with the approbation of Shah Tahmasp, and attracted to the city poets, illustrators and calligraphers, with whom Soltan-Mohammad became acquainted.

Soltan-Mohammad was named governor of Shiraz in 1572. He had acquired a reputation as a poet in Herat, one "noted for his education and cognitive acuity," according to prince Sam Mirza, a contemporary biographer of poets. Muhammad brought a retinue of artists and pets with him to Shiraz, a city that had been a center of philosophic inquiry since the late fifteenth century and more recently as a venue for widely regarded manuscription illumination. Soltan-Mohammad was at Shiraz when his brother, the shah, died.

== Initial power struggle ==
On 25 November 1577, Mohammad Khodabanda's younger brother Ismail II died abruptly and without any initial signs of bad health. The court doctors, who checked the corpse, surmised that he may have died from poison. The general agreement was that his half-sister Pari Khan Khanum had resolved to have poisoned him with the help of the mistresses of the inner harem in retaliation for his bad behaviour towards her. With Ismail II out of the way, Pari Khan Khanum regained her authority and control. Every state grandee, clan chieftains, officers and officials carried out the orders delivered by her deputies and served according to her word.

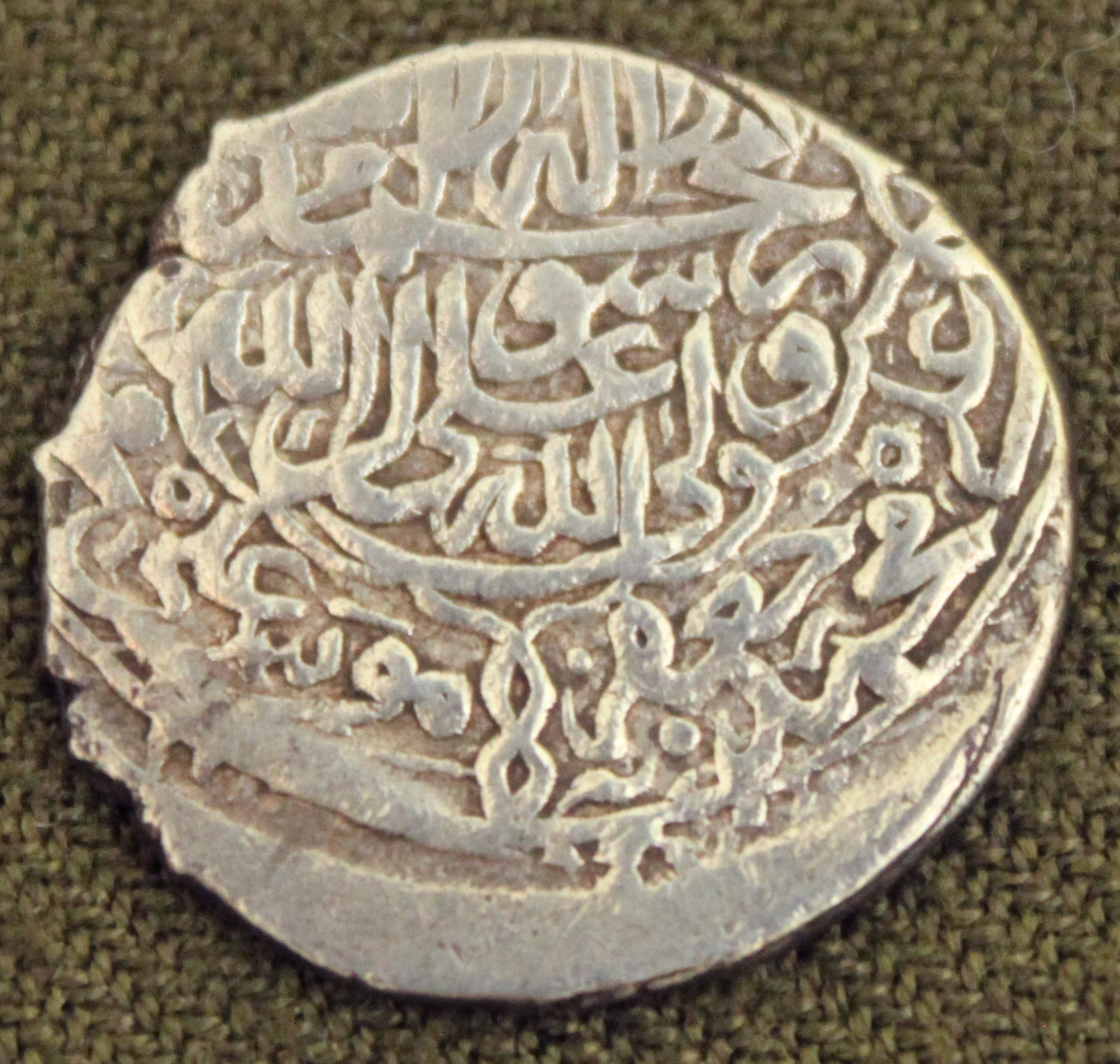
Coin minted during the reign of Mohammad Khodabanda

In order to clear up the succession crisis, the Qizilbash chieftains agreed to appoint the future shah after a conference with each other and then notify Pari Khan Khanum of their settled choice. At first, they discussed the resolution that Shoja al-Din Mohammad Safavi, the eight-month-old infant son of Ismail II, should be crowned as shah while in reality state affairs would be taken care of by Pari Khan Khanum. This suggestion, however, did not get the green light of most of the assembly since it would have swayed the balance of power among many Qizilbash clans. Ultimately the assembly agreed to appoint Mohammad Khodabanda as shah.

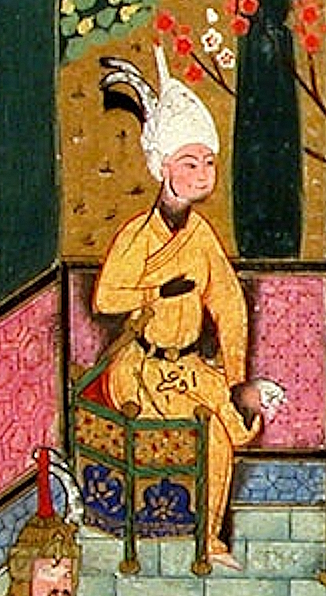
Contemporary depiction of Prince Hamza Mirza, son of Mohammad Khodabanda. Şecāʿatnāme (1586).

The appointment of Mohammad Khodabanda was supported and approved by Pari Khan Khanum, due to him being a man of old age, almost blind, and pleasure-seeking. Thus, he was the appropriate successor, so Pari Khan Khanum could take advantage of his weakness and rule herself. She made an agreement with the Qizilbash chieftains that Mohammad Khodabanda would remain shah in name, whilst her and her envoys would continue controlling the interests of the state.

When Mohammad Khodabanda was crowned shah, the Safavid aristocracy, officers, and provincial governors wanted approval from Pari Khan Khanum to give him a congratulating visit. Pari Khan Khanum's sphere of influence and authority was so dimensional that no one had the courage to visit Shiraz without her unambiguous approval. From the day Mohammad Khobanda was appointed shah, his wife Khayr al-Nisa Begum, who was better known by her title of Mahd-e Olya, took control of his affairs. She was knowledgeable of her husband's deficiency and to atone for his lack of uprightness and quality she resolved to try to become the practical ruler of the Safavid state.

Mohammad Khodabanda and Mahd-e Olya entered the environs of Qazvin on 12 February 1578. This brought an end to the indisputable rule that Pari Khan Khanum had enjoyed for two months and 20 days. Although she was still the practical ruler of the state, she would now meet opposition from Mahd-e Olya and her allies. When they reached the city, Pari Khan Khanum showed up to gladly receive them with great grandeur and parade, sitting in a golden-spun litter, whilst being guarded by 4,000–5,000 private guards, inner-harem personal assistants and court attendants. However, Pari Khan Khanum was eventually strangled the same day by Khalil Khan Afshar under the orders of Madh-e Olya.

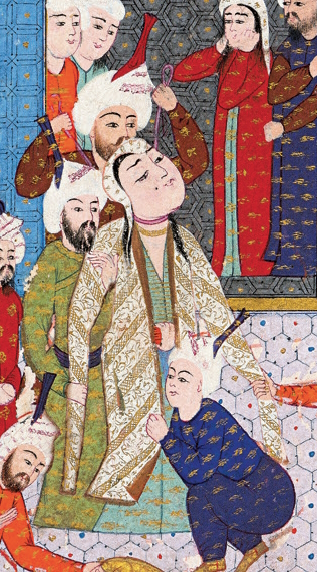
The strangulation of the queen Khayr al-Nisa Begum by the Qizilbash on 26 July 1579. Nusretname (1584)

Mahd-e Olya now took personal control of Iran and began to promote the career of her elder son, Hamza Mirza (she cared little for her younger son Abbas Mirza). But she antagonised the Qizilbash who eventually asked the shah to remove her from power. When she refused to concede to their demands, a group of Qizilbash conspirators burst into the harem and strangled her on 26 July 1579.

== Conflict over succession ==
The Qizilbash factions increasingly came to dominate Iran. In 1583 they forced the shah to hand over his vizier, Mirza Salman, for execution. The young Hamza Mirza took over the reins of state but on 6 December 1586 he too was murdered in mysterious circumstances.

== Foreign threats ==
Foreign powers took advantage of the factional discord in the Iranian court to seize territory for themselves. Uzbek bands attempted to invade northeastern Iran before being repulsed by the governor of Mashhad. The most important event of Khodabanda's reign was the war with the Ottomans. In 1578, the Ottoman sultan Murad III began a war with Safavid Iran which was to last until 1590. In the first attack, the sultan's vizier Lala Mustafa Pasha invaded the Safavid territories comprising Georgia and Shirvan. Shirvan fell before the end of the summer of 1578; as a result, the Ottomans gained control over most of the western coast of the Caspian Sea and could now march on Armenia and Azerbaijan. These territories were subsequently attacked in 1579 by an Ottoman army including a large contingent of Crimean Tatars led by Adil Giray, brother of the Crimean khan. The invasion was repulsed by a remarkable counterattack led by Mirza Salman Jabiri and Hamza Mirza in which Adil Giray was captured. (Later, the Qizilbash amirs accused Mahd-e Olya of having a love affair with Adil Giray and put them both to death.)

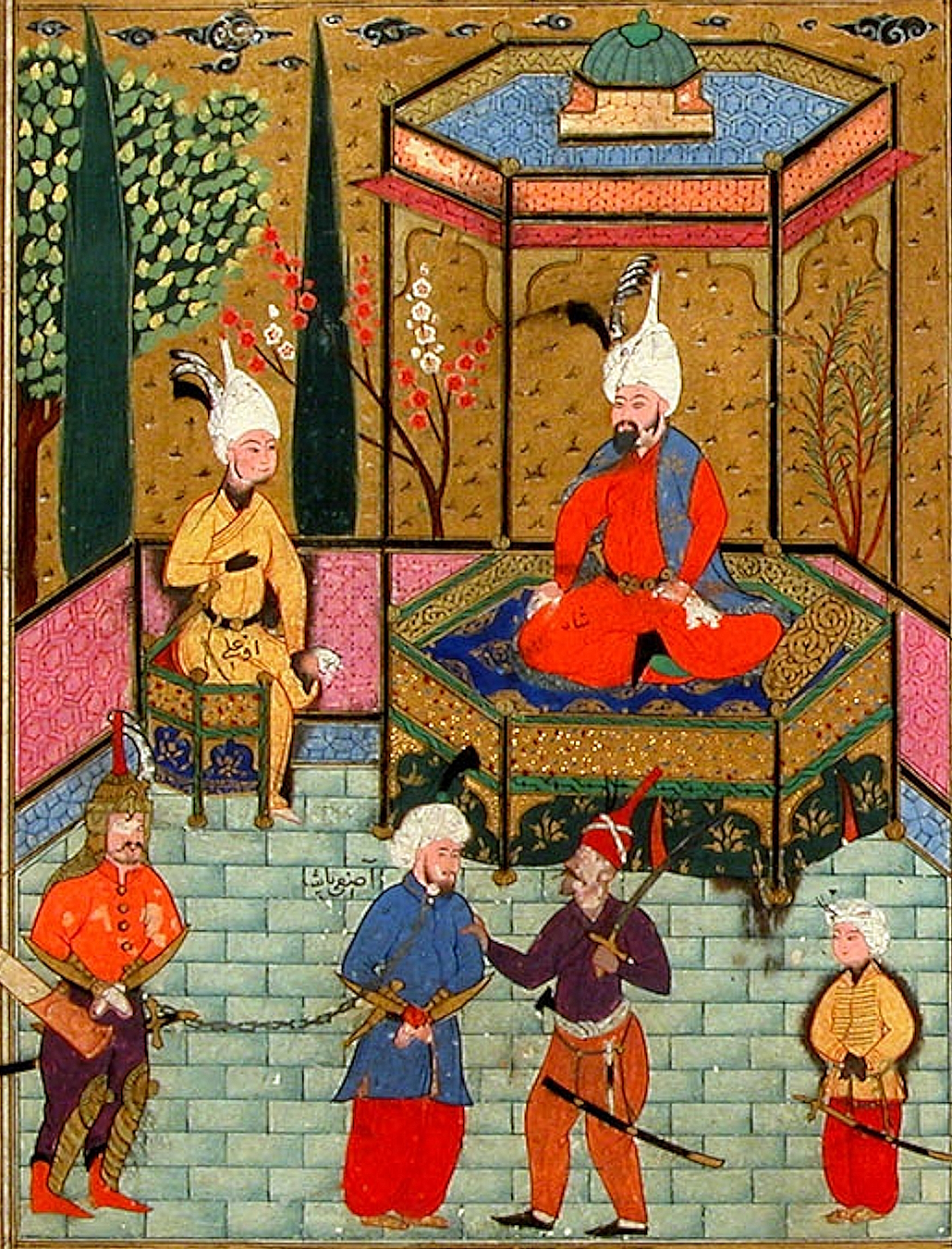
Imprisoned Ottoman officer and author Āṣafī, brought before Muḥammad Khudābanda (enthroned) and his son Prince Ḥamza Mirzā (seated). Şecāʿatnāme (1586).

Another Ottoman army under the leadership of Osman Pasha and Ferhat Pasha crossed into Iran and captured Tabriz in 1585. Khodabanda sent Hamza Mirza to fight the Ottomans, but the young prince was murdered during this campaign, and the city remained in Ottoman hands for 20 years.

== End of reign ==
When the Uzbeks launched a large-scale invasion of Khurasan, the leader of the Ustajlu Qizilbash faction in the province, Murshid Quli Khan, decided the time was right to overthrow the shah and replace him with Khodabanda's son Abbas Mirza, who was Murshid's ward. Murshid and Abbas rode to Qazvin, where the prince was proclaimed the new shah of Iran in October 1587. Khodabanda made no attempt to challenge the coup and accepted his dethronement.

=== Final years ===
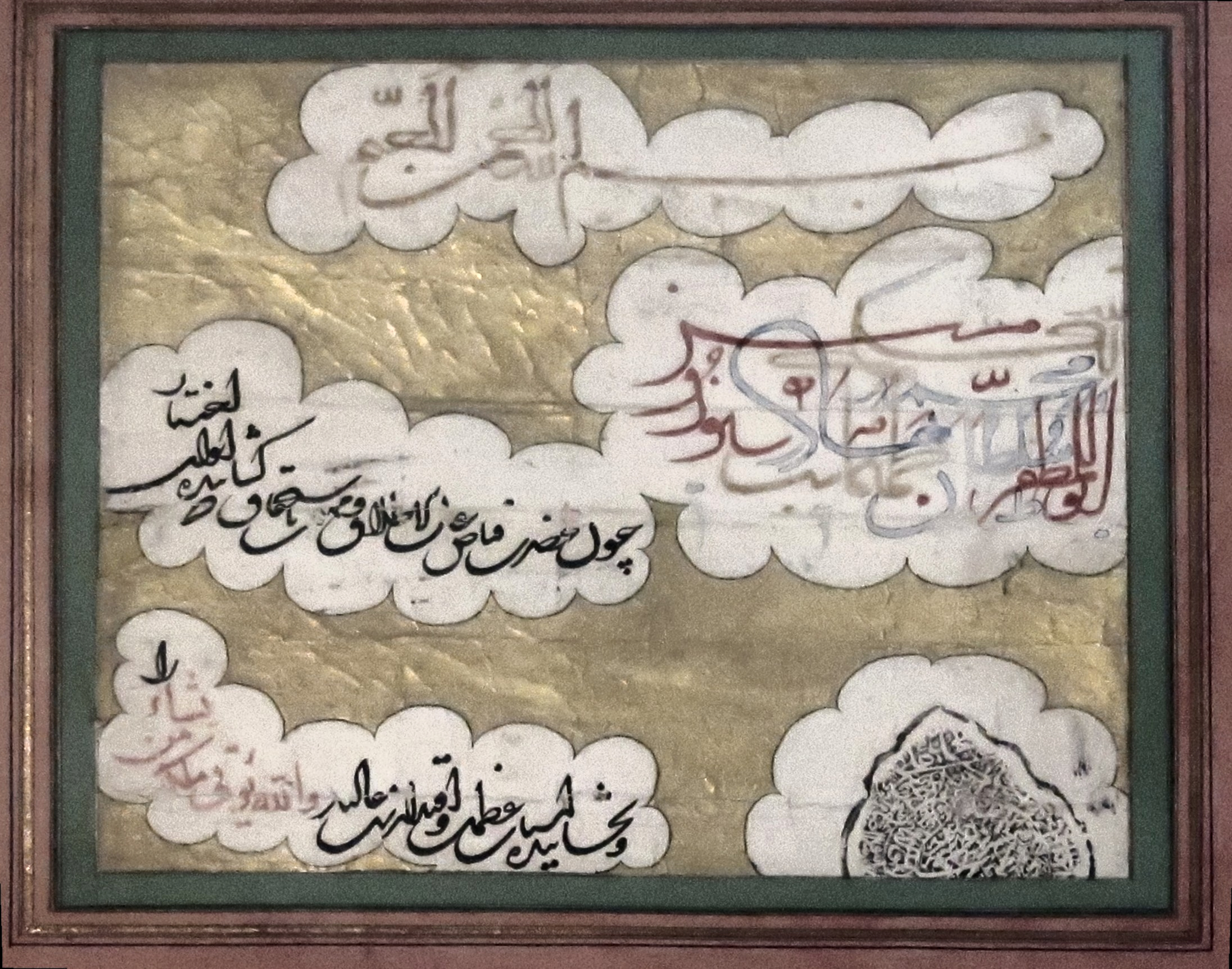
A decree (farman) bearing Mohammad Khodabanda's seal

He lived in the capital for a time but was then apparently banished to the prison of Alamut, although Iskandar Beg Munshi records him dying in Qazvin sometime between 21 July 1595 and 10 July 1596.

== Government ==
Under Khodabanda, important military and political offices in the state were managed by high-ranking members of the Qizilbash. The distribution of these offices fluctuated based on political partnerships. The office of qurchi-bashi (head of the qurchis, the royal bodyguard) was held by members of the Afshar tribe. Tribal leaders held provincial governorships through appointments by the government or by retaining control when the government was too weak to remove them. These regional authorities had significant autonomy under either condition.

The administration of central and provincial government remained under Tajik control. Ismail II's grand vizier Mirza Salman Jaberi of the Jaberi Ansari family from Isfahan, retained his office under Khodabanda. After the murder of Khayr al-Nisa, Khodabanda and Hamza Mirza yielded Mirza Salman to the Turkman–Takkalu faction, which controlled Qazvin and required his surrender in exchange for their continued support. Although Mirza Salman was killed soon afterwards, his family retained the vizierate of the Fars province until the 18th century.

The Tajik presence in the civil and provincial service showed more continuity during this period than in the first Safavid civil war. Administrative roles were held by Tajiks and seyyeds without regard for religious leanings or tribal alliances. This consistency was especially evident in the ongoing appointment of these groups to the post of sadr.

The Tajik chief accountants of Tahmasp I generally remained in their positions. Tahmasp I's final mostowfi ol-mamalek (comptroller general) was Mirza Shokrollah Isfahani, who served as the vizier of Khorasan and warden of the Imam Reza shrine in Mashhad under Khodabanda. Morshed Qoli Khan Ustajlu also employed a member of the Khuzani family in Khorasan.

The Tajik seyyed community was particularly favoured by Khodabanda. In 1578, he appointed the Marashi family as the wardens of the shrine in Qazvin. He also granted an audience to Mir Damad upon his arrival from Mashhad. The latter was a grandson of Ali Karaki and a member of a notable Astarabadi seyyed family.

While the central government continued to be dominated by Turkic and Tajik elements, Georgian and Circassian figures also began to gain prominence. The gholam Farhad Beg was appointed as the main deputy for Hamza Mirza in 1585.

== Art and culture ==
Khodabanda was also a poet who wrote verse under the pen name Fahmi.

== Sources ==
- Babaie, Sussan (2004). Slaves of the Shah: New Elites of Safavid Iran. I.B.Tauris. ISBN 9781860647215.
- Bidlisi, Sharaf Khan ibn Shamsaddin (1976). Sharaf-name Шараф-наме (in Russian). Moscow: Nauka.
- Garthwaite, Gene R. (2005). The Persians. The Peoples of Asia, Vol. 9. Blackwell. pp. 172–173. ISBN 1557868603.
- Ghereghlou, Kioumars (2021). "ESMĀʿIL II – Encyclopaedia Iranica". www.iranicaonline.org.
- Matthee, Rudi (2008). "Safavid dynasty". In Yarshater, Ehsan (ed.). Encyclopædia Iranica (Online ed.). Encyclopædia Iranica Foundation.
- Mitchell, Colin P. (2009). The Practice of Politics in Safavid Iran: Power, Religion and Rhetoric. London: I.B. Tauris.
- Newman, Andrew J. (2006). Safavid Iran: Rebirth of a Persian Empire. London: I.B. Tauris. ISBN 978-1-86064-667-6.
- Parsadust, Manuchehr (2009). "Pariḵān Ḵānom". In Yarshater, Ehsan (ed.). Encyclopædia Iranica (Online ed.). Encyclopædia Iranica Foundation.
- Roemer, H. R. (1986). "The Safavid period". The Cambridge History of Iran, Volume 6: The Timurid and Safavid periods. Cambridge: Cambridge University Press. pp. 189–351. ISBN 9780521200943.
- Savory, Roger (1980). Iran under the Safavids. Cambridge University Press. ISBN 978-0-521-22483-3.
- Sicker, Martin (2001). The Islamic World in Decline: From the Treaty of Karlowitz to the Disintegration of the Ottoman Empire. Greenwood Publishing Group. ISBN 027596891X.
- Taner, Melis (2020). "Illustrated Manuscripts Attributed to Baghdad". Caught in a whirlwind: a cultural history of Ottoman Baghdad as reflected in its illustrated manuscripts. Leiden; Boston: Brill. p. 233, note 549. ISBN 978-9004412699.

Mohammad Khodabanda Safavid dynasty Born: 1532 Died: 1595
Iranian royalty
Preceded by Ismail II	Shah of Iran; 1578–1587	Succeeded by Abbas I
