= Adil Giray (Kalga) =

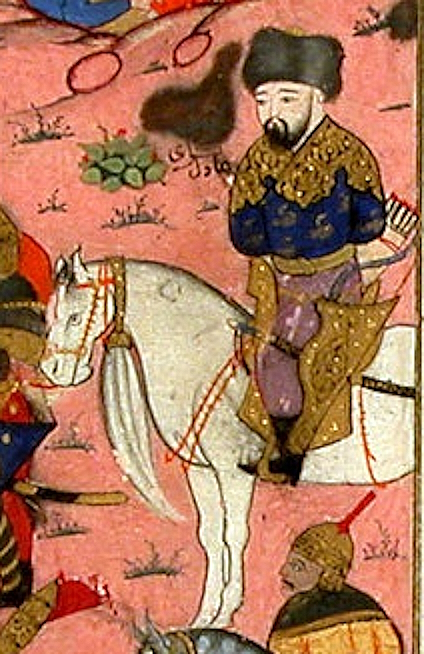
- Crimean Khanate commander Adil Giray Khan, brother of Mehmed II Giray, captured by the Safavids at the Battle of Mollahasanli in Shirvan in November 1578. Şeca'atname (1586).

Kalga
- Khan: Mehmed II Giray
- Died: July 1579; Qazvin, Safavid Iran
- Dynasty: Giray
- Father: Devlet I Giray
- Military career
- Conflicts: Crimean–Circassian wars; Battle of Afips (1570); Ottoman–Safavid War (1578–1590); Siege of Shamakhi (1578); Battle of Mollahasanli (POW)

Adil Giray (عادل گیرای), Adil Khan Giray or Adil Giray Khan (died 1579) was a younger brother of the Crimean Khanate ruler and Khan Mehmed II Giray. He was a Kalga, the second highest rank after that of Khan.

Adil had poor relations with his older brother Mehmed, so he moved to the steppe, built the town of Bola-Serai on the Kalmius River and gathered Nogai supporters. The brothers were ultimately reconciled by their father Devlet I Giray before his death.

During the Ottoman–Safavid War (1578–1590), the Ottoman Empire sultan Murad III ordered the Crimeans to fight the Persians near the southwest corner of the Caspian Sea. In 1551 his predecessor, Sahib I Giray, had been overthrown by the Ottomans for refusing a similar order. Mehmed sent 20,000 men under his brothers Adil, Mubarak and Gazi. After a 3-month march along the north side of the Caucasus and down the Caspian coast, in November they reached Safavid Shirvan (approximately modern Azerbaijan) and joined Özdemiroğlu Osman Pasha. They completely defeated 25,000 Persians under Shirvan Beylerbey Aras Khan Rumlu who were besieging Shamakhi. This victory gave to the Ottomans control of the Western Caspian region, and access to Azerbaijan and Armenia. They moved south to the Mugan plain where they defeated the Rumlu tribe of Qazilbash nomads. During this period, the Georgians allied with the Ottomans.

In the meantime, the Uzbeks of Abdallah Khan were attacking the central Persian region of Khorasan, but he was soon forced to retreat due to pressure from the Kirghiz-Kazakh tribes of Central Asia.

An Iranian army arrived under Hamza Mirza, the Safavid prince, and Mirza Salman, and on 28 November 1578 the Crimean Khanate forces were completely defeated at the Battle of Mollahasanli. All their booty was captured as was Adil Giray. The battle was fought in heavy rain which made their horses slip and weakened their bows. Adil was unhorsed by a spear and saved his life by identifying himself as a valuable captive.

Adil was executed in July 1579 in Qazvin during the next campaign, partly as a result of a palace intrigue involving the Shah's wife Khayr al-Nisa Begum, with whom he was accused of having had an illicit love affair.

After these events, the Georgians again allied with the Persians, and massacred numerous Sunnis.

The Persians would suffer a large defeat against the Ottomans at the Battle of Torches, in early May 1583. The Ottomans then took back control of the western Caspian. The Persians lost a large part of their frontier territories to the Ottomans and the Uzbeks, until the advent of the new Safavid shah Abbas the Great.

Following the death of Adil Giray, the position of Kalga, the second highest rank after that of Khan, was given to Alp Giray, while Sa'adet Giray received the newly created dignity of nureddin, second after the qalga.

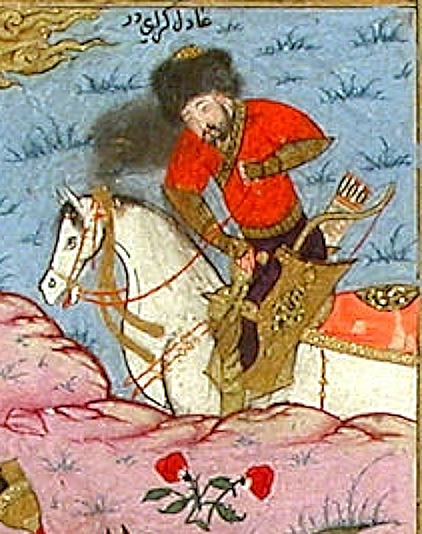
Adil Giray on horse. Şeca'atname (1586)

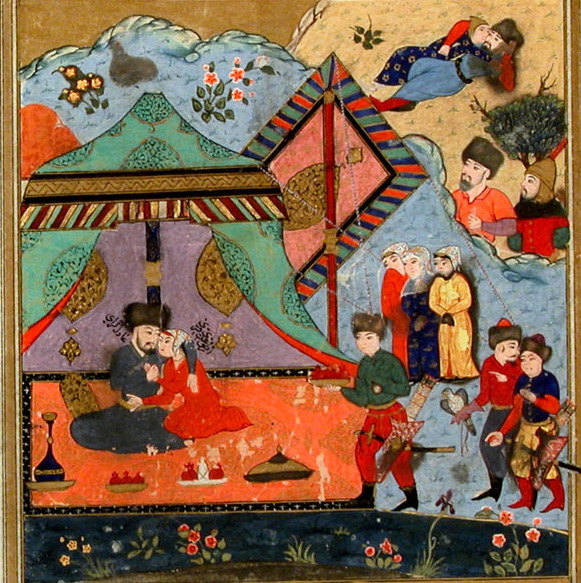
Adil Giray with Khayr al-Nisa Begum, wife of Shah Mohammad Khodabanda, Şeca'atname (1586)

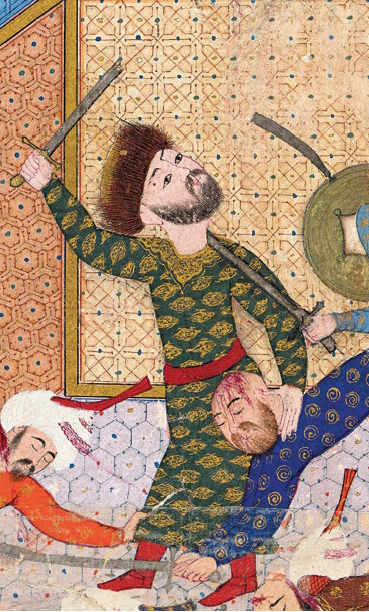
Assassination of Adil Giray at the Safavid court. Nusretname (1584)
