= Khayr al-Nisa Begum =

Wife of Safavid shah Mohammad Khodabanda (died 1579)

Khayr al-Nesa Begum
- Mahd-e 'Oliā
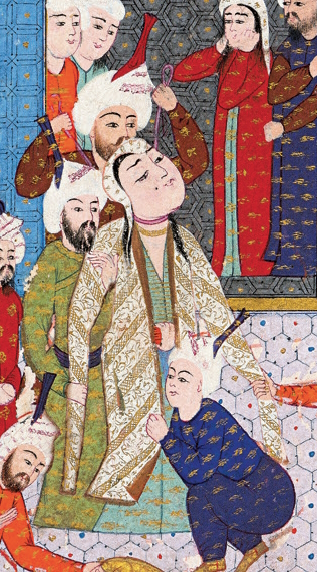
- The strangulation of Khayr al-Nisa Begum by the Qizilbash, at the Safavid court on 26 July 1579. Nusretname (Topkapi, H.1365) (1584).

Chief consort of the Safavid Shah
- Tenure: 11 February 1578 – 26 July 1579
- Born: Mazandaran, Safavid Iran
- Died: 26 July 1579; Qazvin, Safavid Iran
- Burial: Fatima Masumeh Shrine
- Spouse: Mohammad Khodabanda (m. 1565)
- Issue: Sultan Hamza Mirza; Abbas I; Abu Talib Mirza; Tahmasp Mirza; Shah Begum
- Dynasty: Mar'ashi (by birth); Safavid (by marriage)
- Father: Mir Abdollah Khan II
- Mother: Fakhr al-Nesa Begum
- Religion: Twelver Shi'ism

Khayr al-Nisa Begum (Persian: خیرالنساء بیگم; known under the royal title Mahd-i Ulya (مهد علیا), "the highest-ranked cradle"; died 26 July 1579) was an Iranian Mazandarani princess from the Marashi dynasty, who was the wife of the Safavid shah (king) Mohammad Khodabanda (r. 1578–1587) and mother of Abbas I. During the early part of her husband's reign, she was a powerful political figure in her own right and governed Iran de facto between February 1578 and July 1579. She gained power with the assassination of Pari Khan Khanum.

== Biography ==
=== Background ===
She was the daughter of Mir Abdollah Khan II, the Marashi ruler of the province of Mazandaran, who claimed descent from the fourth Shi'a Imam Zayn al-Abidin. She was related to Khan Ahmad Khan of Gilan. Members of the family had ruled Mazandaran since the mid-14th century. In 1565–66 Mahd-i Ulya fled to the Safavid court after her cousin Mir Sultan-Murad Khan murdered her father. Here she was married to Shah Tahmasp I's son Mohammad Khodabanda. The desire for revenge on her father's killer would remain with her for the rest of her life.

=== Rule ===
In 1578, on the death of his brother Ismail II, Mohammad Khodabanda became Shah of Iran. Khodabanda was a weak-willed ruler and the leading woman at the court, his ruling sister Pari Khan Khanum (who had allied with the all powerful Qizilbash army factions) believed she could easily control him. From the day Khobanda was appointed king, Mahd-i Ulya, took control of his affairs. She was knowledgeable of her husband's deficiency and to atone for his lack of uprightness and quality she resolved to try to become the practical ruler of the Safavid state.

Mohammad Khodabanda and Mahd-i Ulya entered the environs of Qazvin on 12 February 1578. This brought an end to the indisputable rule that Pari Khan Khanum had enjoyed for two months and twenty days. Although she was still the effective ruler of the state, she would now meet opposition from Mahd-i Ulya and her allies. When they reached the city, Pari Khan Khanum showed up to receive them with a parade, sitting in a golden-spun litter, whilst being guarded by 4,000–5,000 private guards, inner-harem personal assistants and court attendants.

Mahd-i Ulya was continually informed by the welcoming social gatherings in Qazvin about the large amount of influence and power that Pari Khan Khanum held, thus confirming what she had already been told by Mirza Salman Jaberi, the former vizier of Ismail II. She then realized that as long as Pari Khan Khanum was alive, she would not be able to control the affairs of the Safavid state and become the de facto ruler of the country. She thus began planning to have her killed.

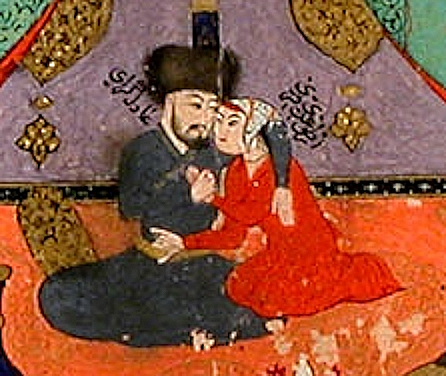
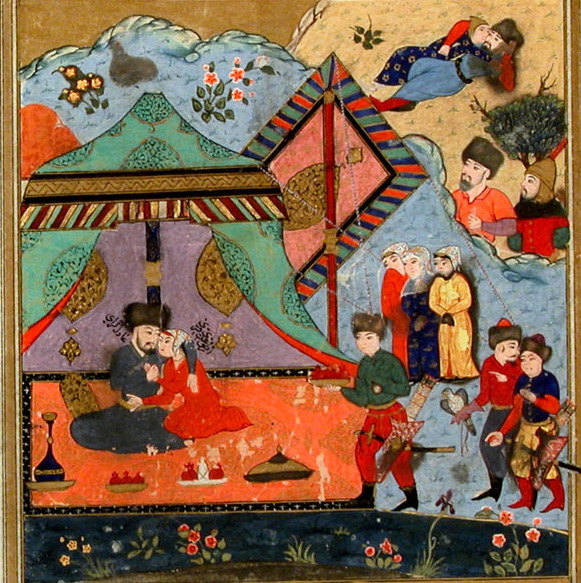
Depiction of the affair between the Crimean Tatar commander Adil Giray and Khayr al-Nisa Begum. Şeca'atname (1598)

The order was carried out in 12 February 1578, when Khalil Khan Afshar, who had served as Pari Khan Khanum's tutor during the reign of Tahmasp, had her strangled to death. Pari Khan Khanum's powerful uncle, Shamkhal Sultan, was executed shortly after, whilst Ismail II's infant son Shoja al-Din Mohammad Safavi was murdered.

Mahd-i Ulya now assumed effective control of Iran. She was kept informed of all political developments in the country and built up her own network of support by appointing friends and relatives to important posts. She favoured the "Tajiks" (Persians) instead of the Qizilbash. Her chief aims were promoting the career of her elder son Hamza Mirza (at the expense of his brother Abbas) and seeking revenge for her father. Since his killer, Sultan-Murad Khan, had already died, she turned her attention to his son Mirza Khan. Qizilbash leaders had given Mirza Khan a promise of safe-conduct but as he was travelling to the capital Qazvin the queen's supporters seized and killed him.

=== Downfall ===
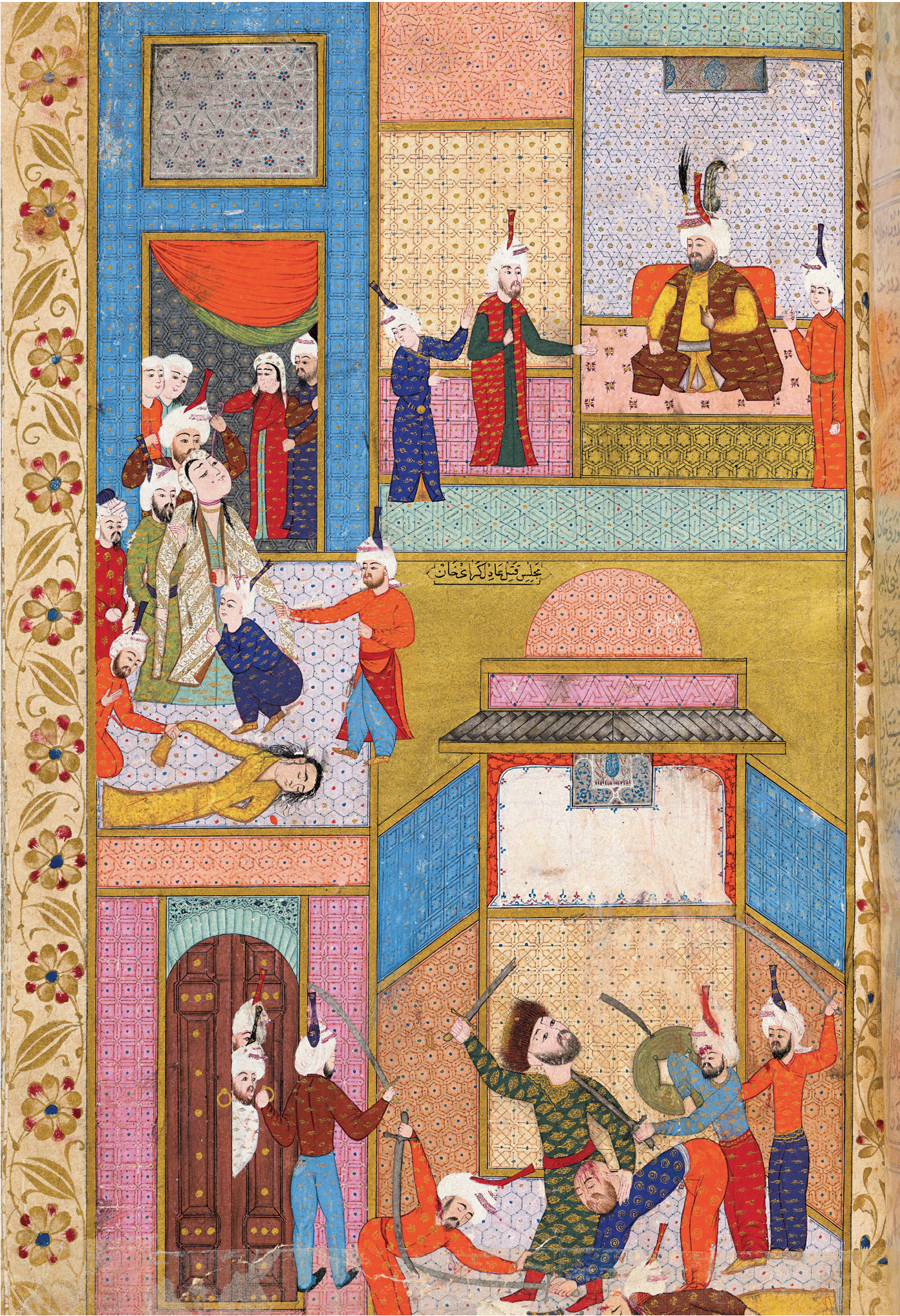
Execution of Khayr al-Nisa Begum and Adil Giray. Nusretname (1584).

Angered by the queen's actions, the Qizilbash sent a petition to the Shah, asking him to remove her from power or face revolts. The Shah considered sending her into exile but Mahd-i Ulya refused to concede to their demands. The Shah even offered to abdicate and retire to Shiraz, in vain.

Finally, a group of Qizilbash conspirators accused the queen of having a love affair with Adil Giray, brother of the Crimean Tatar Khan, who was being held captive at the Safavid court by Brajan Bodo. They burst into the harem and strangled her on 26 July 1579, together with many of her retinue, family and countrymen. Adil Giray too was assassinated on the same occasion.

== See also ==
- List of the mothers of the Safavid Shahs

== Sources ==
- Nashat, Guity; Beck, Lois (2003). Women in Iran from the Rise of Islam to 1800. University of Illinois Press. pp. 1–253. ISBN 978-0-252-07121-8.
- Savory, Roger (2007). Iran under the Safavids. Cambridge University Press. pp. 1–288. ISBN 978-0521042512.
- Parsadust, Manuchehr (2009). "PARIḴĀN ḴĀNOM". Encyclopaedia Iranica.
- Uluç, Lâle (2013). "The representation of the execution of the Safavid Begum from the Ottoman Historian Mustafa Ali's Nusretname". 14th International Congress of Turkish Art Proceedings (PDF). Paris: Collège de France. pp. 799–820. ISBN 978-9751736970.
