= Nusretname =

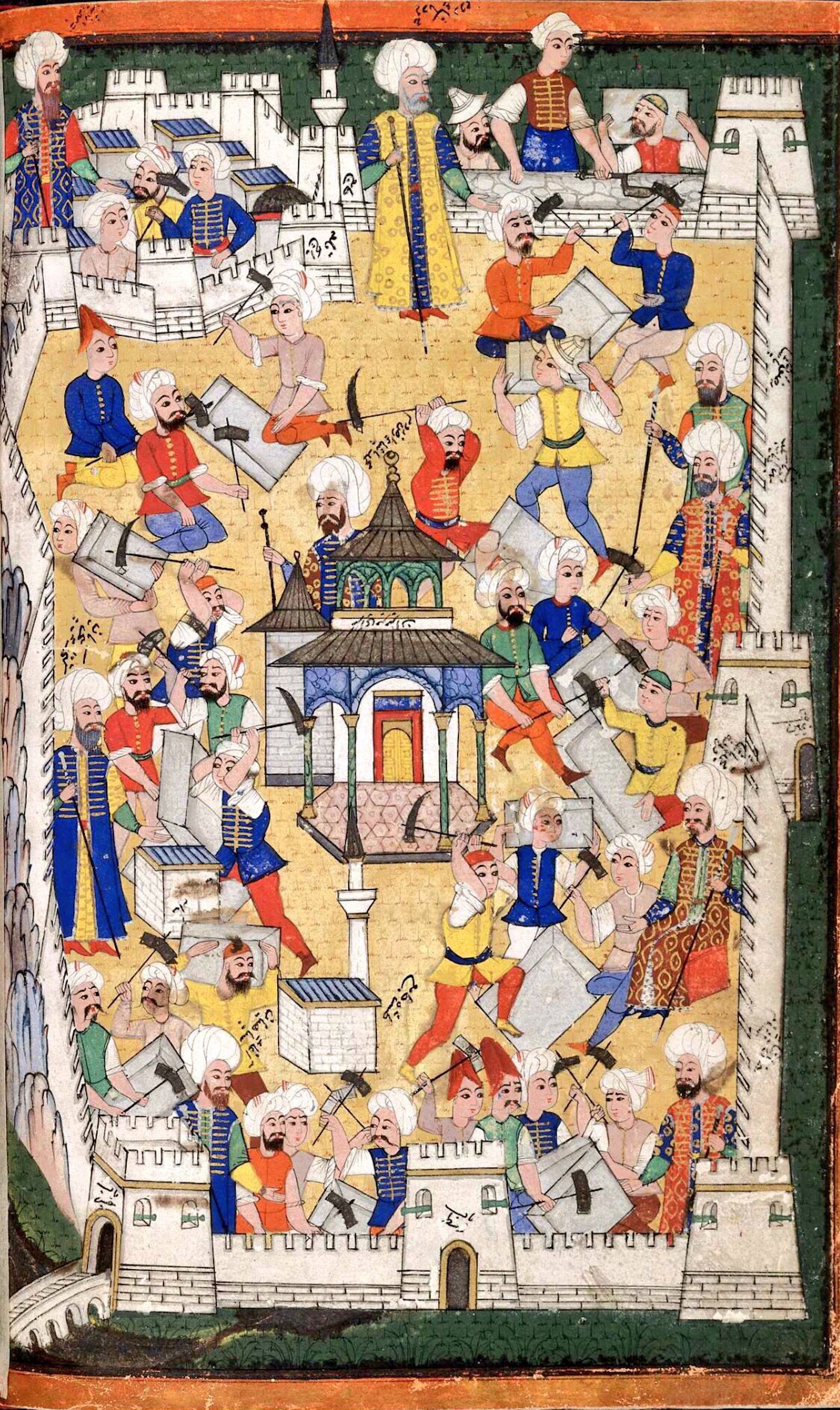
- Construction works at the castle of Kars, Nusretname (1582), British Library Add. 22011, f.198v
- Author: Gelibolulu Mustafa Ali
- Publication date: 1582-1584

The Nusretname or Nusratnama (Ottoman Turkish: نصرت‌نامه Nuṣretnāme, "Book of victory") was an Ottoman account of the campaigns of Lala Mustafa Pasha in the Caucasus, Georgia and Shirvan in 1578–1580, at the onset of the Ottoman–Safavid War (1578–1590). The first copy was created in 1582 in Aleppo by the Ottoman bureaucrat Gelibolulu Mustafa Ali (Muṣṭafa ʿĀlī, d. 1600), during the reign of Murad III, and a second more lavish copy was created at the court in Istanbul in 1584.

== British Library, Add. 22011 (1582) ==
A first copy of the Nusretname was completed by Muṣṭafa ʿĀlī in the winter of 1580-81, while he was in post in Aleppo. This early copy is now in the British Library: Nuṣretnāme (The British Library, Add. 22011). It has six paintings, and is dated 1582.

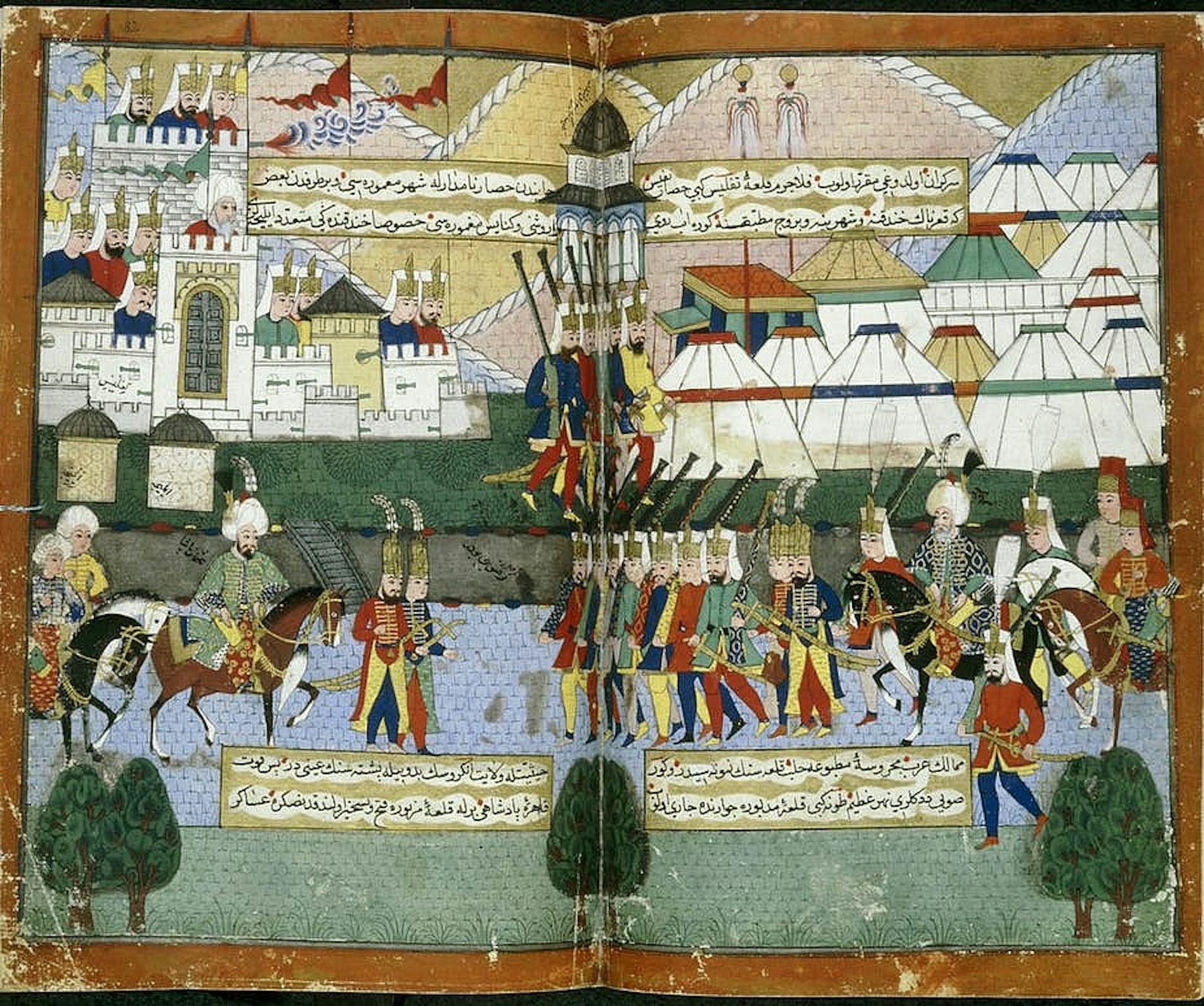
Ottoman army at Tiflis in the autumn of 1578. Nusretname ff.81v-82r

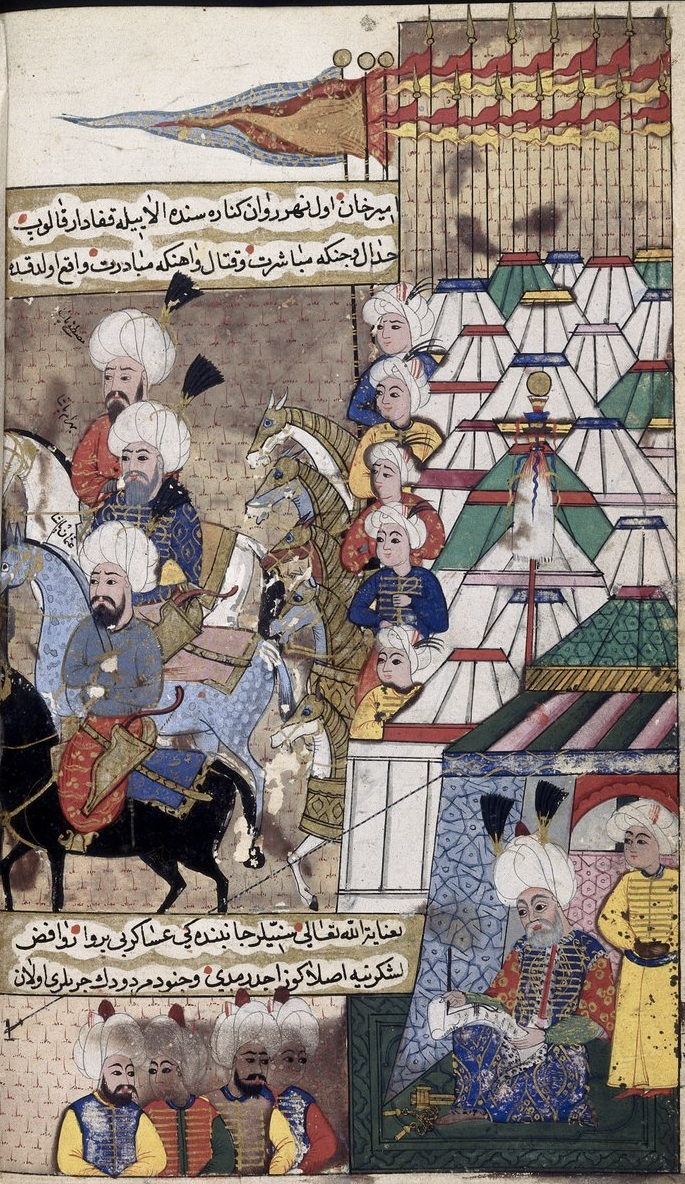
Nusretname (1582) f.98

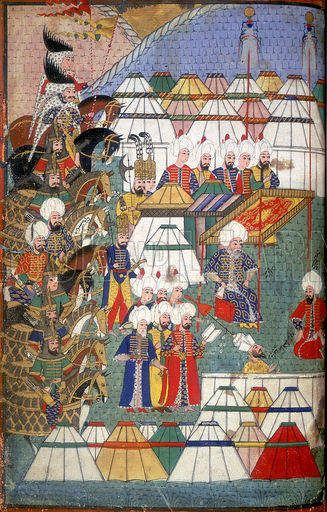
Lala Mustafa Pasha in camp after his victory at Kars. Nusretname f.199r

== Topkapi, H.1365 (1584) ==
When Muṣṭafa ʿĀlī presented his work to Sultan Murad III in Istanbul, the Sultan was highly impressed, and requested an even more lavish copy to be made. This copy is now in the Topkapi Palace: Nusretname (Topkapi, H.1365), dated 1584. It has 48 illustrations, including 8 double-page illustrations, with illuminated margins throughout the manuscript. This second copy was also created under the supervision of Muṣṭafa ʿĀlī, and was made in the Ottoman palace workshop.

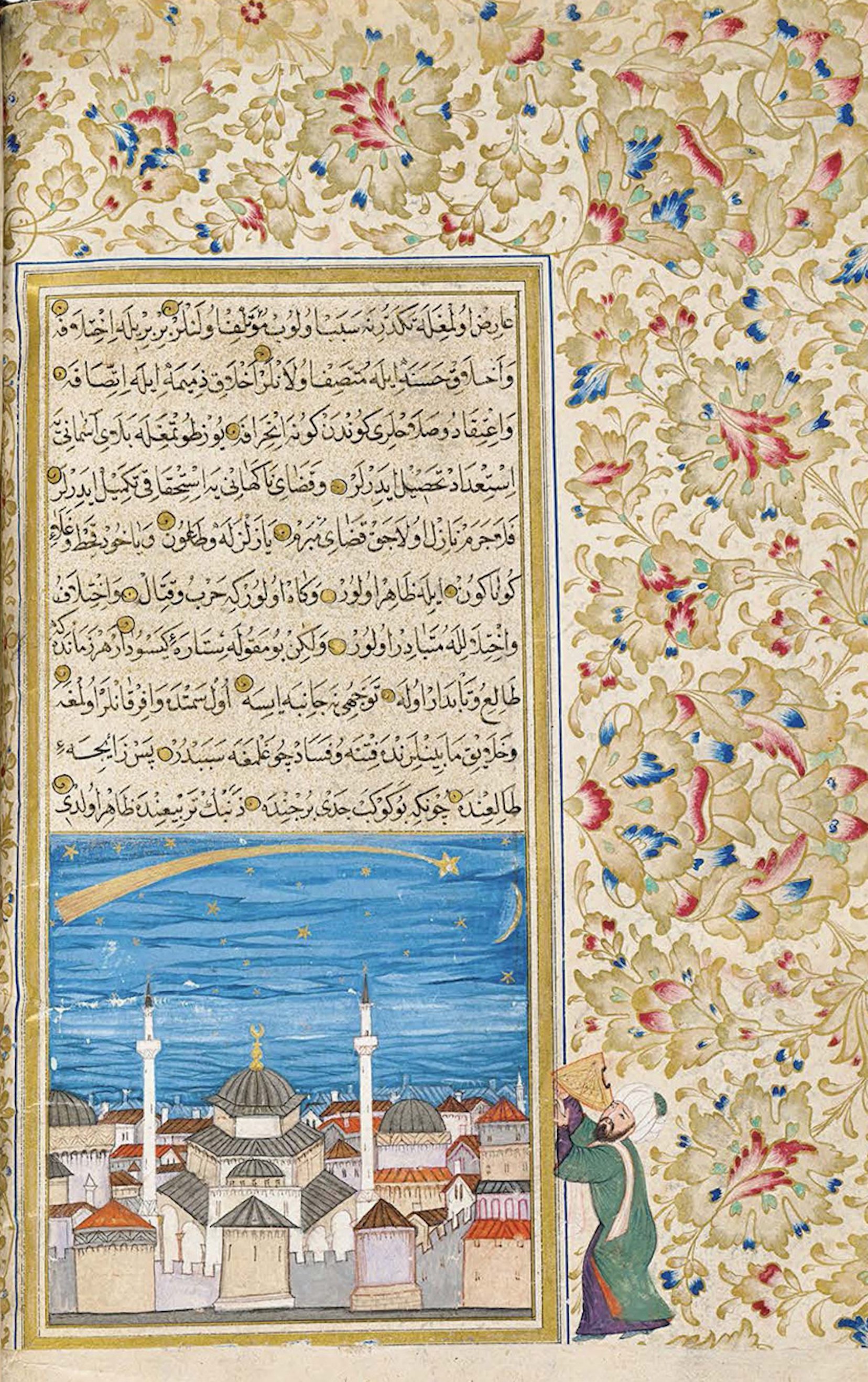
An auspicious star before the Ottoman-Safavid war

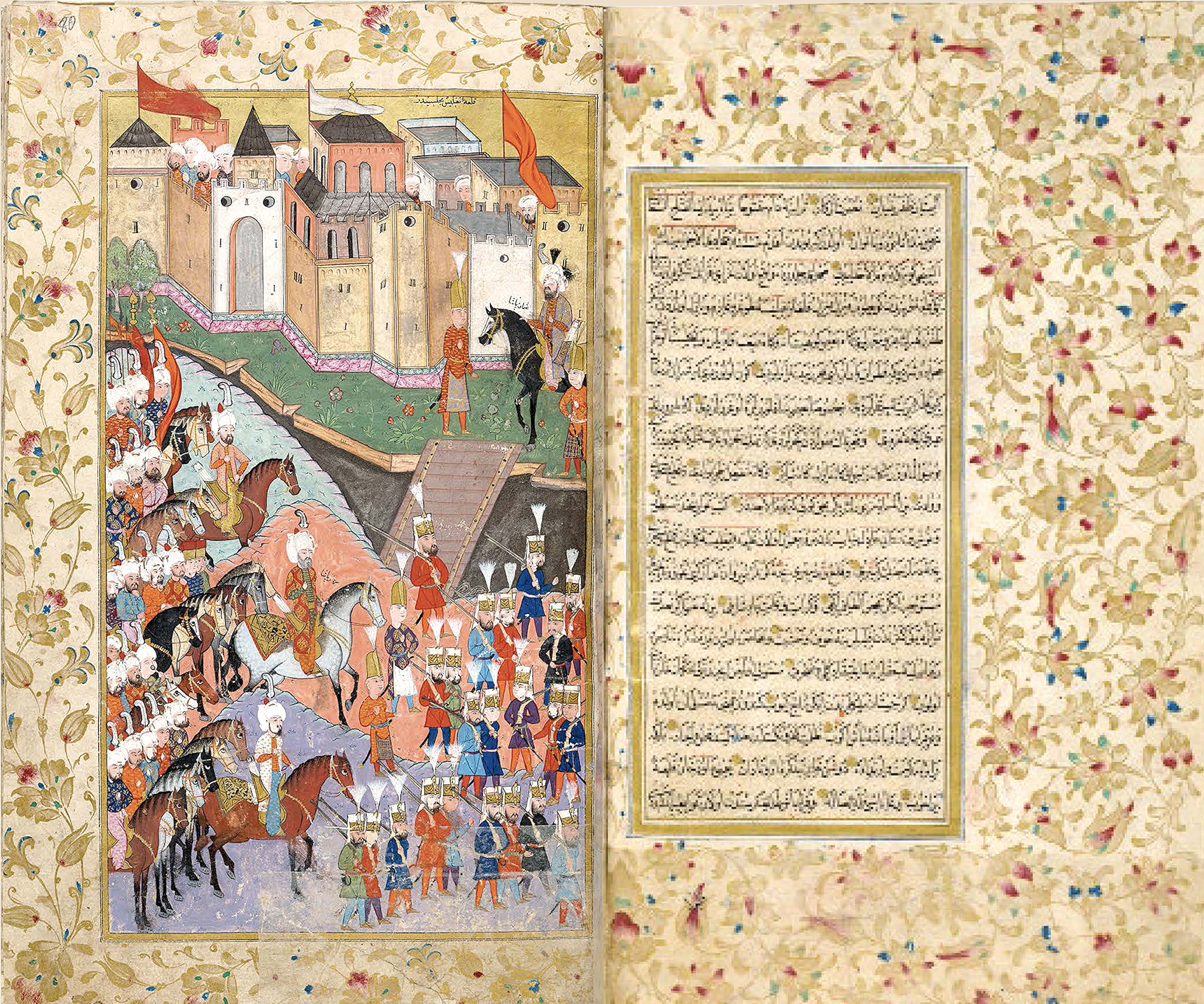
Departure of the Ottoman army for the war under Lala Mustafa Pasha, parading before Osman Pasha (عثمان باشا)

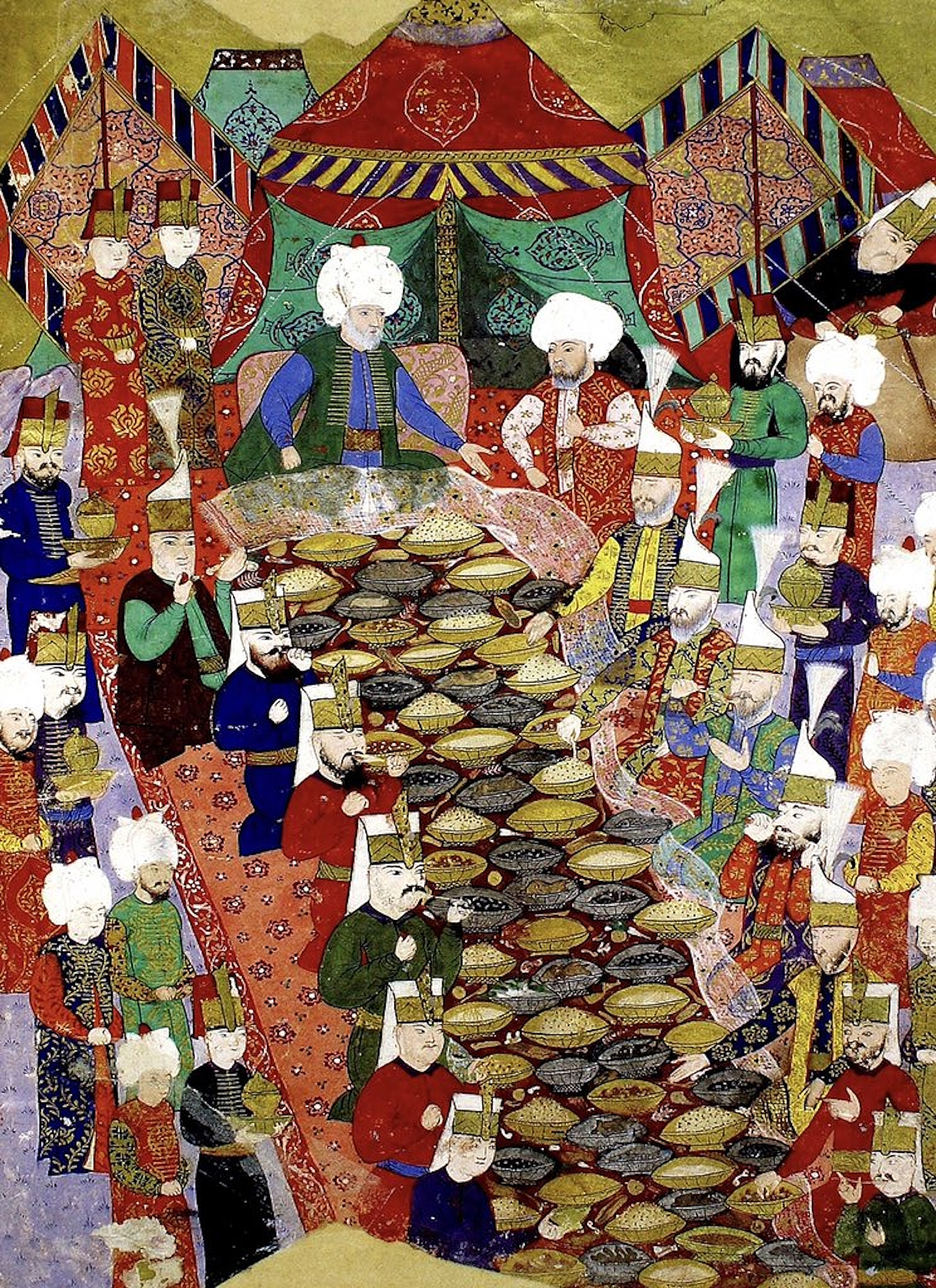
Banquet given by Lala Mustafa Pasha to the Jannissaries in Izmit in 1578

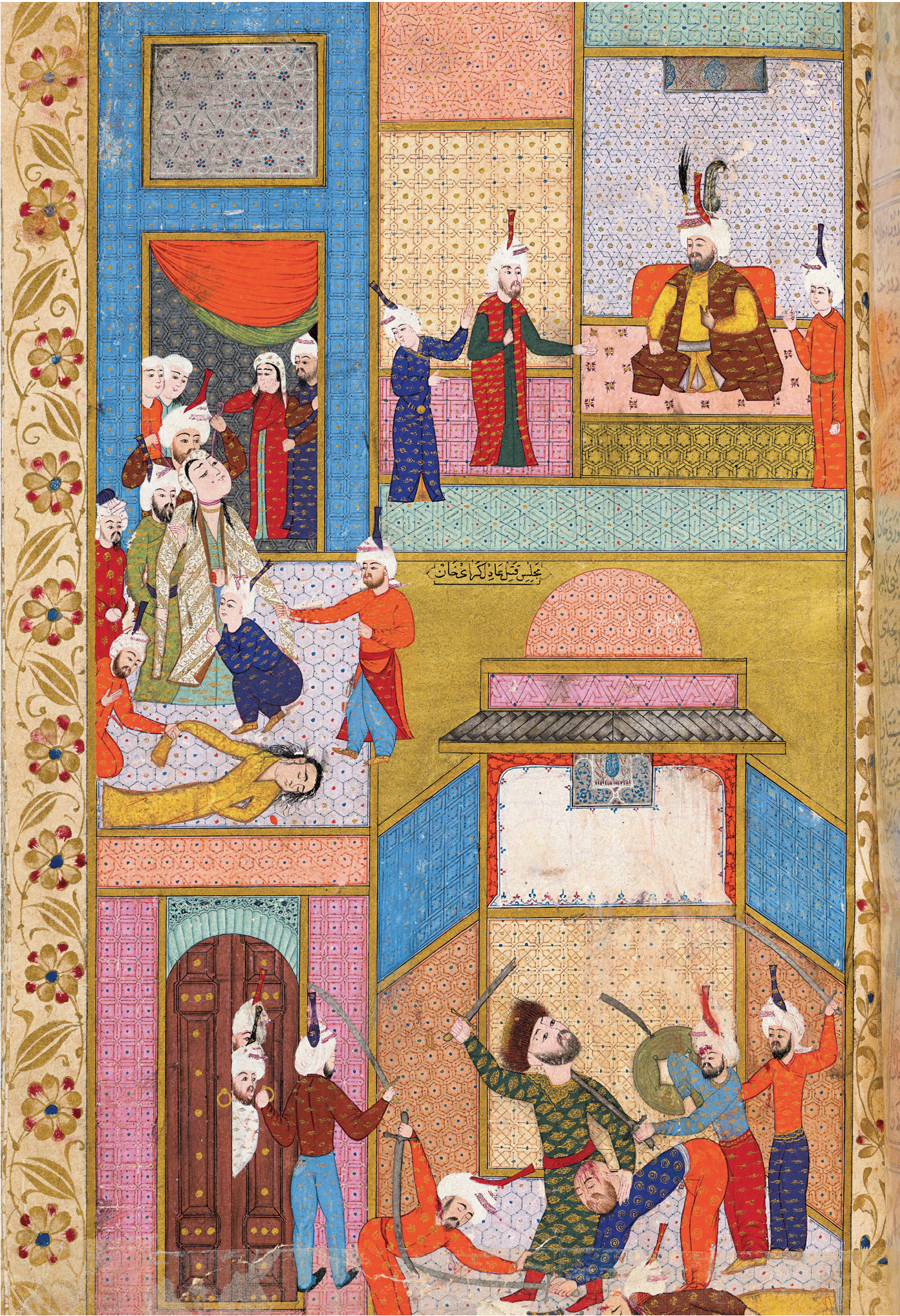
The assassination of Adil Giray Khan and Khayr al-Nisa Begum

== Related works ==
Several major Ottoman illustrated manuscripts were created to relate the war against the Safavids, such as the Nuṣretnāme ("Book of Victory") of the Ottoman bureaucrat Muṣṭafa ʿĀlī (d. 1600) detailing the campaigns of Lālā Muṣṭafa Paşa, the Şecāʿatnāme ("Book of Valor") of Āsafī Dal Meḥmed Çelebi (d. 1597–98) and the Tārīh-i ʿOsmān Paşa ("History of ʿOsmān Paşa") by an anonymous author reporting the campaigns of Özdemiroğlu Osman Pasha (d. 1585), governor of Şirvān.

== Sources ==
- Uluç, Lâle (2013). "The representation of the execution of the Safavid Begum from the Ottoman Historian Mustafa Ali's Nusretname". 14th International Congress of Turkish Art Proceedings. Paris: Collège de France. pp. 799–820. ISBN 978-9751736970.
