= Tabreh Castle =

Castle in Isfahan Province, Iran

Coordinates: 32°39′20.31″N 51°41′24.84″E

- قلعه طبره
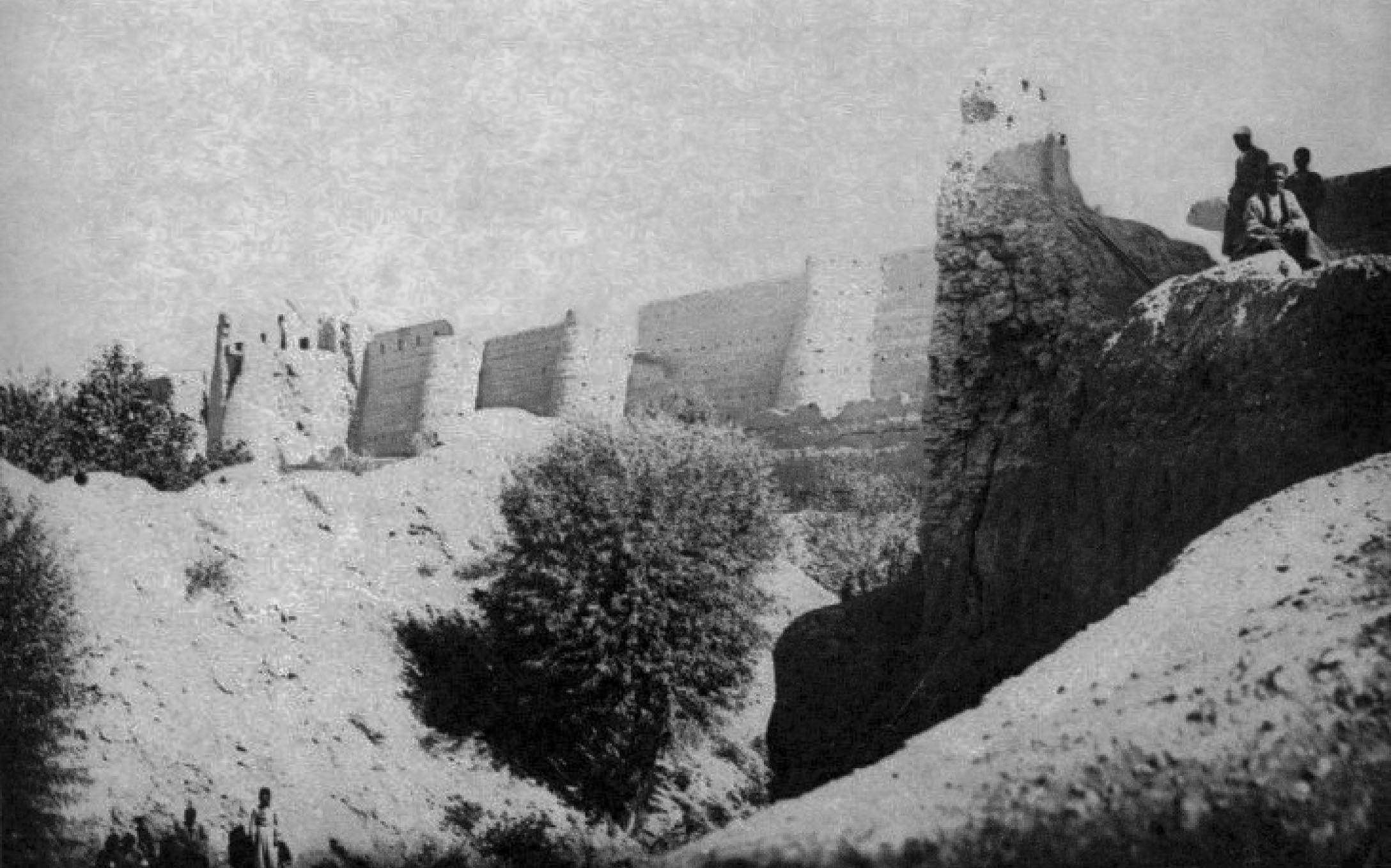
- Interactive map of the Tabreh Castle area

General information
- Type: Castle
- Location: Isfahan County, Iran

Tabreh Castle (Persian: دژ طبره) was a historical castle in Isfahan County in Isfahan Province, The longevity of this fortress dates back to the Sasanian Empire.
