= Şeca'atname =

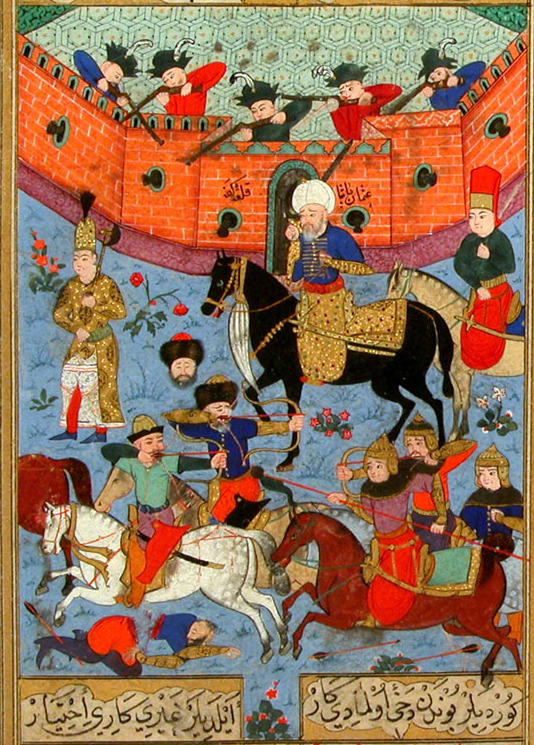
- Osman Pasha at the Siege of Caffa during the Crimean campaign (1584). Şeca'atname
- Author: Dal Mehmed Çelebi Asafi
- Publication date: 1586

The Şeca'atname (Ottoman Turkish: شجاعة نامه, Şecāʿatnāme or Šajāʿat-nāme, "Book of Valor" or "Book of Bravery") was an illustrated record of the exploits of the Ottoman statesman and general Özdemiroǧlu Osman Pasha during the Ottoman–Safavid War (1578–1590), written by his secretary Dal Mehmed Çelebi Asafi (d. 1597–98) and completed in September 1586.

The Şeca'atname deals with the event of the Ottoman-Safavid wars between 1578 and 1585. Şecāʿat (شجاعت) is an Arabian word meaning "bravery", "boldness", "courage". There are two copies: one, unillustrated, is in the Topkapı Palace Museum Library (R. 1301), and the other, illustrated, at the Istanbul University Rare Books and Manuscripts Library (T.6043). Both manuscripts were copied by ʿAli b. Yūsuf. The Book of Valor is written in Turkish, in the naskh script and uses rather plain language. It represents a developing trend in Ottoman literature, away from the Persianate aesthetic in terms of both visual idiom and language, where court histories were written by bureaucrats rather than poets, using plain Turkish rather than Persian, and employing the naskh and dîvânî scripts rather than the poetic ta'liq. Still, Asafi displayed a taste for Persian literature, and his illustrations have Persian characteristics.

Asafi joined the conflict in 1577–78, first as a secretary to Lala Mustafa Paşa, and then to Özdemiroǧlu Osman Pasha. In 1581, Asafi was captured by the Safavid Kizilbas, and kept in captivity in Qazvin and Isfahan, but was released in 1585. He was then made governor-general of Kefe (Caffa) in Crimea. After three years, he became governor-general of Semahi (Sirvan).

Asafi had a remarkable career progression, from scribe to financial official and member of a Pasha's household, to Sancak (Governor) Begi, and then to Pasha.

Another famous war account of the period is the earlier Nusretname (1582-84), which records the campaigns of Lala Mustafa Pasha in the Caucasus.

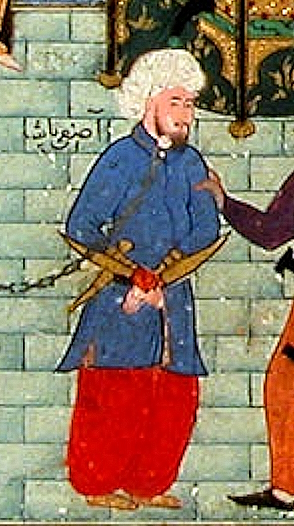
The author, Dal Mehmed Çelebi Asafi, imprisoned circa 1584–85 at the Safavid court of Mohammad Khodabanda

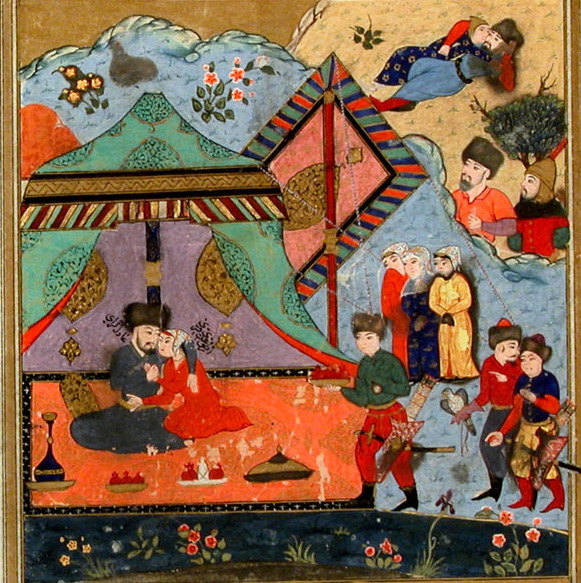
Depiction of the affair between the Crimean Tatar commander Adil Giray and the Safavid queen Khayr al-Nisa Begum

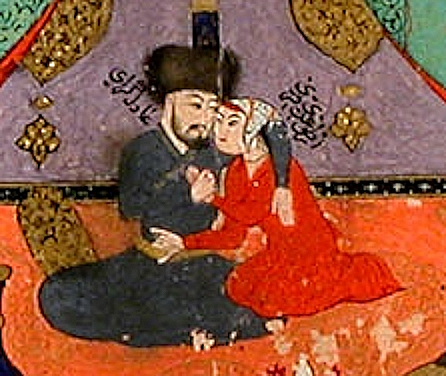
The affair between the Crimean Tatar commander Adil Giray and the Safavid queen Khayr al-Nisa Begum (detail)

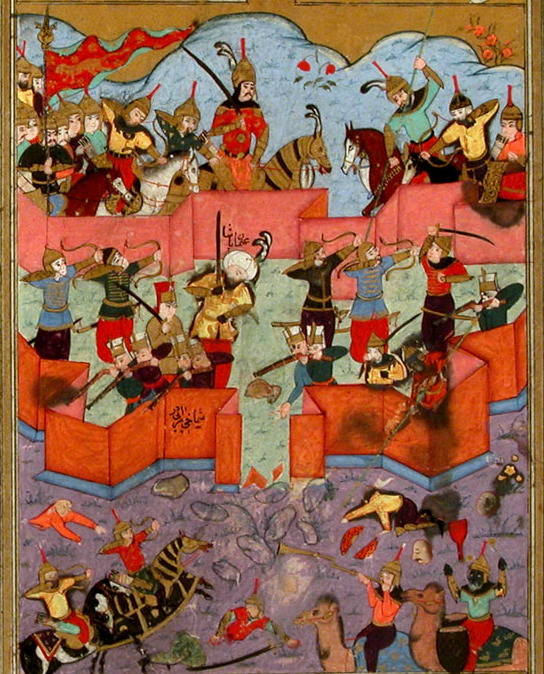
Siege of Shamakhi (1578)

== Sources ==
- Fleischer, Cornell H. (1986). Bureaucrat and Intellectual in the Ottoman Empire: The Historian Mustafa Ali (1541-1600). Princeton University Press. ISBN 978-0691638447.
- Eravci, H. Mustafa (18 April 2023). "The Role of the Crimean Tatars in the Ottoman-Safavi Wars". Selçuk Üniversitesi Türkiyat Araştırmaları Dergisi (57). doi:10.21563/sutad.1285102.
- Papuashvili, Tamar (10 December 2020). "The Childiri Battle According To Şecâ'atnâme" (PDF). 2nd Intertational Conference on Research in Social Sciences and Humanities: 55. doi:10.33422/2nd.icrsh.2020.12.08.
- Taner, Melis (2020). "Illustrated Manuscripts Attributed to Baghdad". Caught in a whirlwind: a cultural history of Ottoman Baghdad as reflected in its illustrated manuscripts. Leiden; Boston: Brill. ISBN 978-9004412699.
- Tunca, Ece (2017). Depiction of the enemy through the eyes of an Ottoman bureaucrat (thesis) (PDF). Budapest: Central European University.
