= Lala Mustafa Pasha's Caucasian campaign =

1578 Ottoman campaign against the Safavids

- Part of the Ottoman–Safavid War (1578–1590)
Date	1578–1579
Location	Caucasus
Result	Ottoman victory
Territorial changes	Kingdom of Kartli became vassal of the Ottoman Empire

Belligerents
Ottoman Empire	Safavid Iran; Kingdom of Kartli; Kingdom of Kakheti; Principality of Samtskhe; Principality of Guria; Principality of Okotskaya; Terek Cossacks

Commanders and leaders
Lala Mustafa Pasha; Özdemiroğlu Osman Pasha; Dervis Pasha	Tokhmaq Khan Ustajlu; Imam Kulu Khan; Qara Khan (WIA); Simon I of Kartli; Alexander II of Kakheti; Shikh-Murza Okotsky

Lala Mustafa Pasha's Caucasian campaign was a military expedition launched in 1578 by Lala Mustafa Pasha, a grand-vizier of the expanding Ottoman Empire. It is also considered a part of the larger conflict, Ottoman–Safavid War (1578–90).

== History ==
The main objective of the campaign was to conquer the South Caucasus, most of which, at the time, belonged to or was subject to the Safavid Empire. On August 7, the Ottomans crossed what is nowadays the Georgian border, namely the Samtskhe-Saatabago principality. The Georgians fought fiercely, but political fragmentation rendered them incapable of stopping the Ottoman advance. On August 9, 1578, Turkish armies defeated the coalition of Irano-Georgian forces in the Battle of Çıldır, about 150km southwest of Tiflis, the capital of the Georgian Kingdom of Kartli.

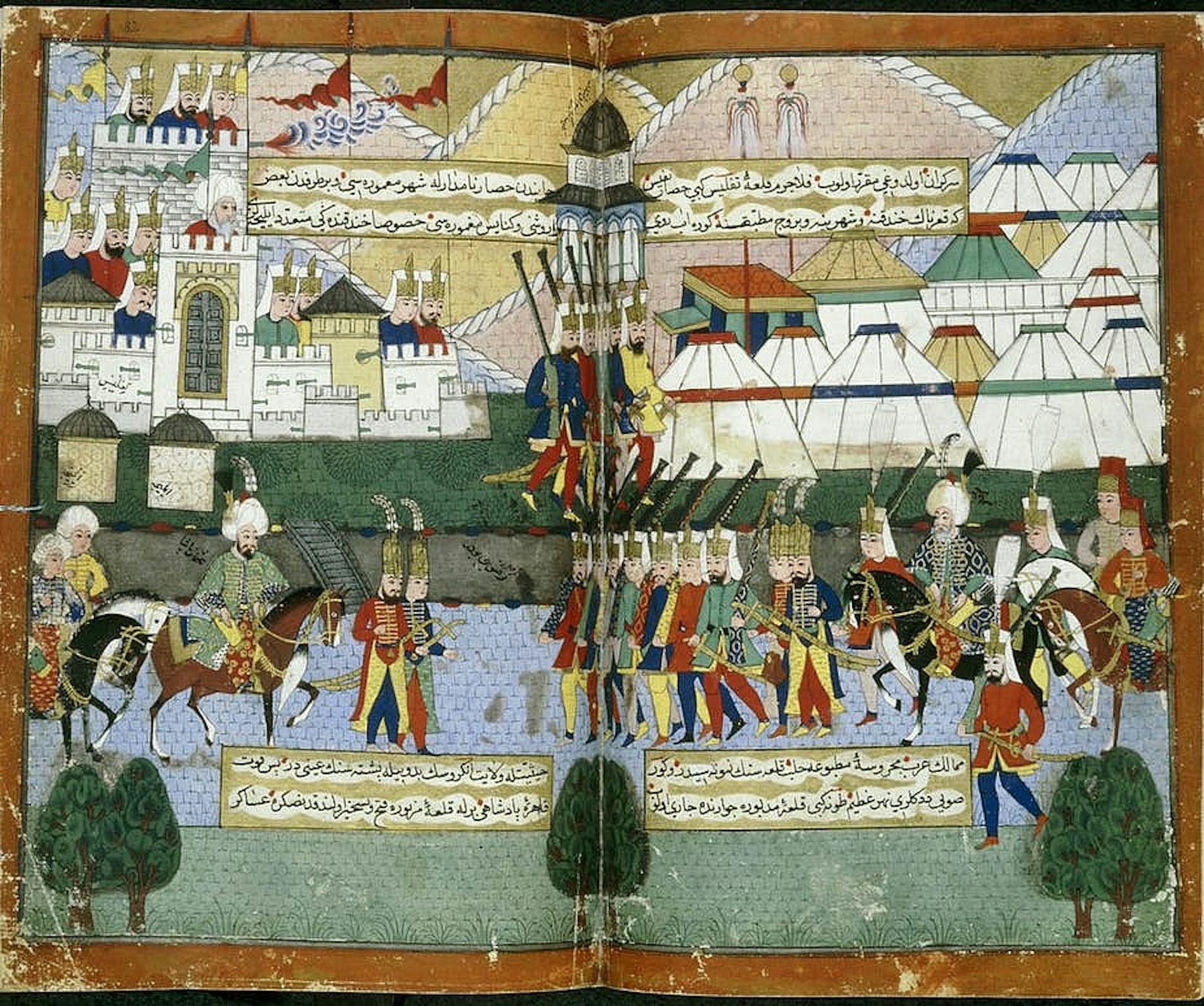
Lala Mustafa Pasha's Ottoman army parading before the walls of Tbilisi in August 1578. Nusretname, Topkapi, H.1365.

The Georgian Prince Manuchar II Jaqeli, brother of the ruler of Samtskhe Qvarqvare IV Jaqeli, was present at the Battle of Çıldır, where he watched the Ottomans win from a nearby mountaintop. After the battle ended, on August 10th, Manuchar descended, and handed over the keys of the nearby castles, while at the same time he looked on the thousands of captured men of the combined Safavid-Georgian army being executed on the spot. Subsequently, the Ottomans took the rest of Samtskhe, and divided it into eight sanjaks. Manuchar II was appointed head of one of these sanjaks, that of Khakhuli.

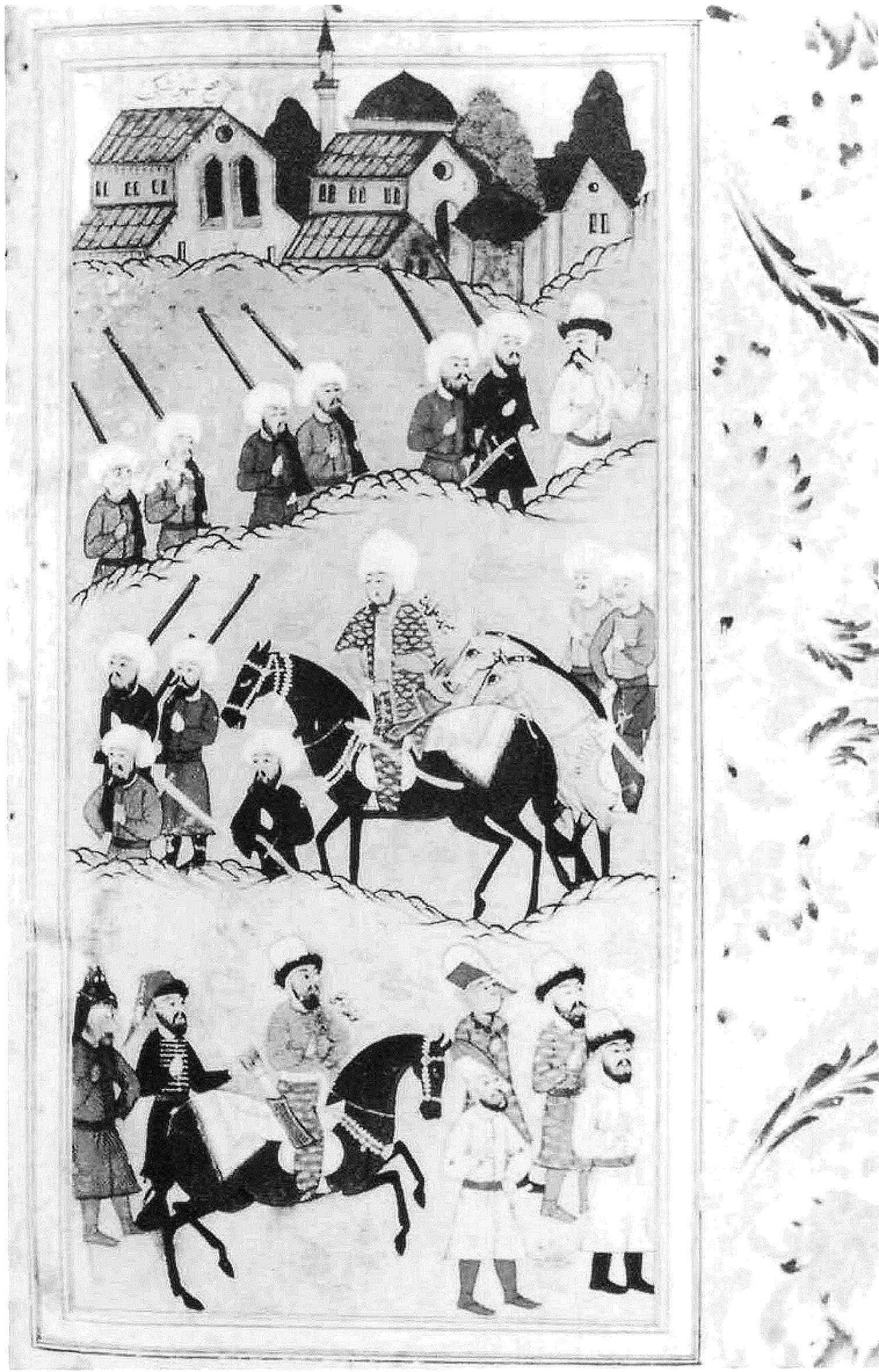
Ottoman troops under Lala Mustafa Pasha, and Alexander II of Kakheti with his Georgian troops (bottom) at the conquest of Sheki in Shirvan from the Safavids on 10 September 1578. Nusretname, Topkapi, H.1365.

The Ottomans continued their expansion against the Safavids, and by the August 24 took the Georgian capital of Tbilisi, the capital of the Kingdom of Kartli as well, which was subordinate to Safavid Iran. The King of Kakheti, Alexander II of Kakheti acted wisely and made peace with the Ottomans on September 1, agreeing on the payment of annual tribute. Because of this agreement, the Kingdom of Kakheti managed to escape the war completely unharmed, but had to participate in the Ottoman military campaign in Shirvan. After this, Lala Mustafa Pasha headed to Shirvan and Dagestan, which he sought to conquer as well from the Safavids.

After campaigning in the eastern Caucasus, Mustafa returned to Erzurum by crossing Kartli and Samtskhe and left Özdemiroğlu Osman Pasha in charge of defending the Ottoman conquests as far as Shirvan. The counter-attacking Safavids suffered a major defeat at the Siege of Shamakhi (1578) in 9–12 November 1578 but were successful at the Battle of Mollahasanli at the end of the month and forced Osman Pasha to regroup in Derbent.

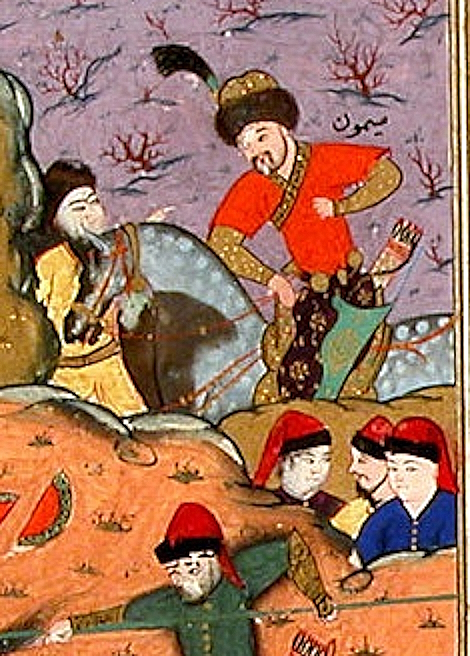
Simon I of Kartli with his troops in a battle with the Ottoman Erzurum army circa 1579-80. Secaatname (1586)

The Georgians started a number of uprisings against their new Ottoman overlords. The Shah of Iran, exploiting the weakness of the Ottomans, released Simon I of Kartli, who earlier fought against Safavid domination, from captivity. The Safavids hoped that Simon would now start a war against the Turks and their expectations came true, ending the short-lived Ottoman domination in the Caucasus and allowing them to install their puppet David XI on the throne of Kartli.

The Turks also established territorial units with Ottoman officials in the conquered areas, for example - Beylerbeylik of Tbilisi (Kartli), Sanjak of Gori, Eyalet of Childir, and others.

The campaign, which was part of the greater war that lasted between 1578-1590, was largely successful. For around two decades after the end of the war, most of the regions conquered from the Iranian Safavids in the North and South Caucasus, remained in Ottoman hands.

== See also ==
- Ottoman–Iranian Wars
- Treaty of Istanbul (1590)

== Sources ==
- Rayfield, Donald (2012). Edge of Empires: A History of Georgia. Reaktion Books. ISBN 978-1780230702.
- Georgian Soviet encyclopedia. Vol. 7. Tbilisi. 1984. p. 211.
