= Dervis Pasha =

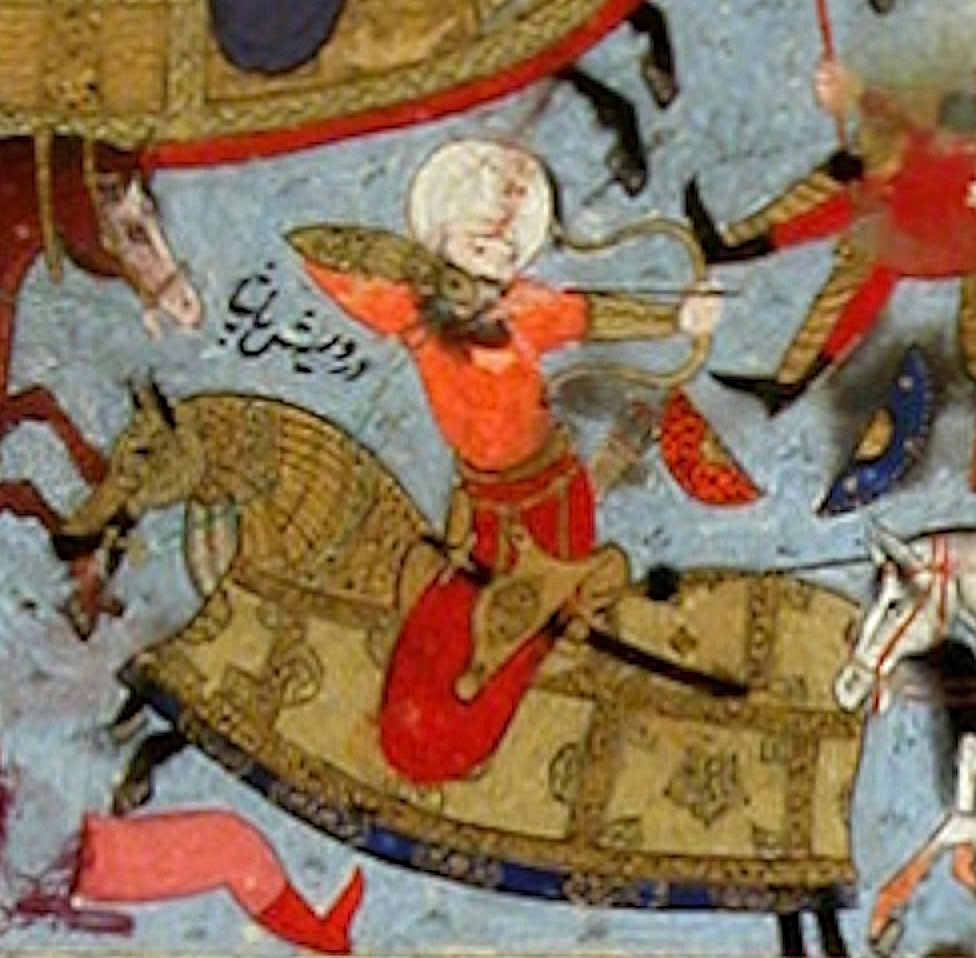
Ottoman commander Dervis Pasha at the 1578 Battle of Çıldır. Secaatname (1586).

Dervis Pasha (-1578) was the Ottoman Governor of Diyarbekir in the 1570s. He played an important role in the Ottoman–Safavid War (1578–1590), as an Ottoman commander at the 1578 Battle of Çıldır.

Derviş Pasha was a member of the Bosnian Sokolović family, and a brother of Ferhad Pasha Sokolović, an Ottoman statesman and governor (sancakbeyi until 1580, and beylerbeyi thereafter) of Bosnia from 1574 to 1588. He had another brother named Kara Ali Bey, who was appointed to be the Klis sancakbeyi in 1574, and then the governor of Isztolni Beograd and Esztergom for fifteen years. Kara Ali Bey took part in the Ottoman campaigns in Hungary and died in 1595 at the Siege of Esztergom.

During the 1578 Georgian campaign of Ottoman Commander-in-Chief of Lala Mustafa Pasha, the Ottoman army was descending onto the Çıldır plain via Ardahan to conquer Georgian fortresses. Dervish Pasha was in charge of a small force of advance guards composed of about 300-400 soldiers. Dervish Pasha was surprised by a 20,000-strong Safavid force led by Tokmak Khan, İmam Kulu, and Kara Khan, whose objective was to prevent the Ottoman army from crossing the mountains. Dervish Pasha nevertheless engaged the superior Safavid forces and incurred major losses. Realizing the seriousness of the situation, Mustafa Pasha sent Osman Pasha to Dervish Pasha's aid. Osman Pasha came to the rescue with 600 soldiers, providing support to the struggling Ottoman army. Osman Pasha ordered his troops to take precautions, sending his musketeers into a constant barrage of fire on the Safavid army. Thanks to Osman Pasha's bravery, a difficult victory was achieved against the Safavids.

Dervis Pasha is depicted during his engagement in the Battle of Çıldır in the Şecāʿatnāme (1586).

Derviş Pasha died in 1578 during this expedition to Georgia.

== Sources ==
- Dakic, Uros (2012). The Sokollu family clan and the politics of vizieral households in the second half of the sixteenth century (thesis) (PDF). Budapest: Central European University.
- Eravcı, H.Mustafa (2017). Özdemiroğlu Osman Paşa. Akçağ. ISBN 9786053423928.
- Matthee, Rudi (2014). "The Ottoman-Safavid War of 986-998/1578-90: Motives and Causes". In Karpat, Kemal; Balgamış, Deniz (eds.). International Journal of Turkish Studies. Vol. 20, Nos 1& 2.
- Papuashvili, Tamar (10 December 2020). "The Childiri Battle According To Şecâ'atnâme" (PDF). 2nd Intertational Conference on Research in Social Sciences and Humanities. doi:10.33422/2nd.icrsh.2020.12.08.
- Rayfield, Donald (2012). Edge of Empires: A History of Georgia. Reaktion Books. ISBN 978-1780230702.
