= Capture of Tabriz (1585) =

Part of Ottoman–Safavid War (1578–1590)

- Part of the Ottoman–Safavid War (1578–1590)
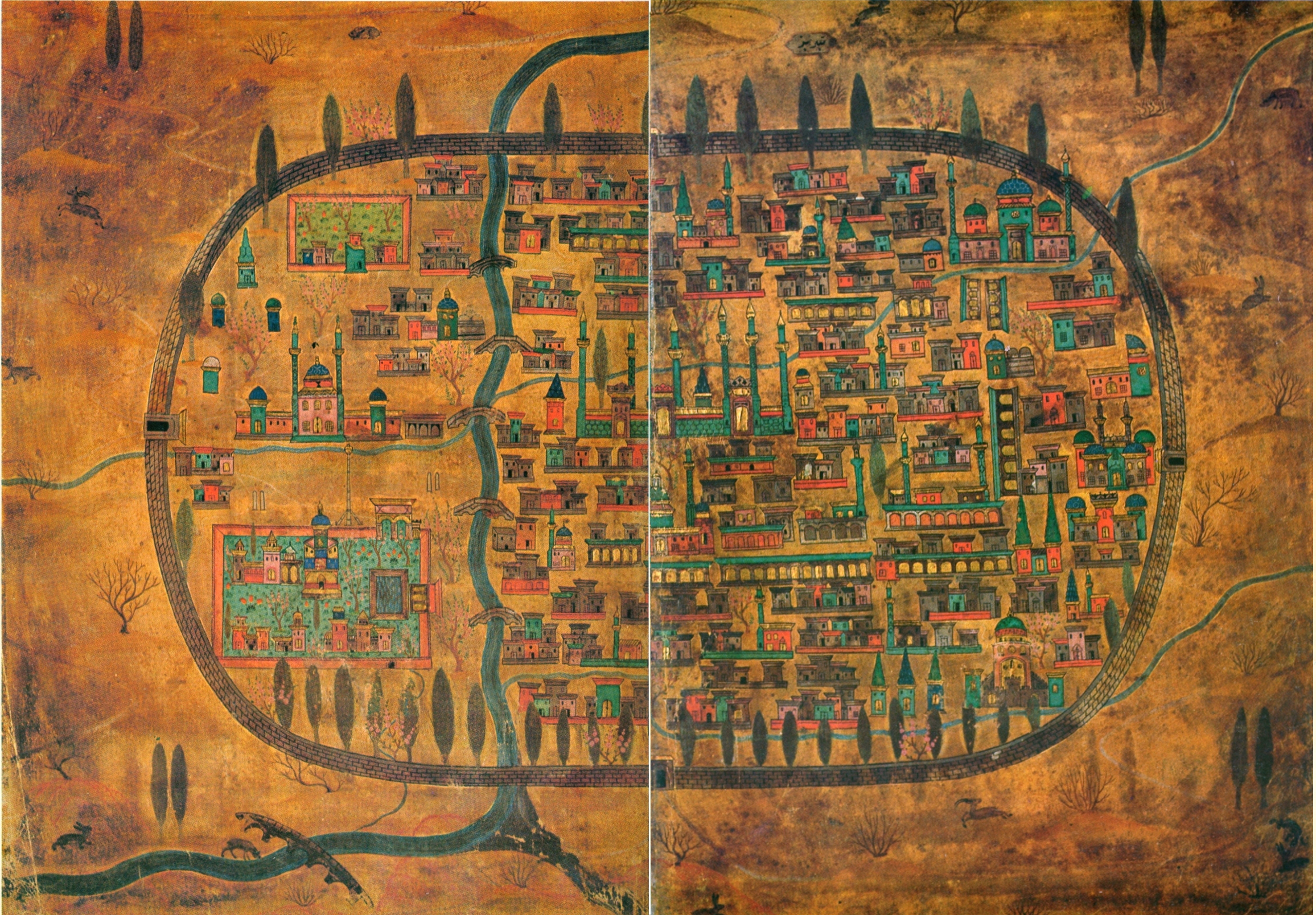
- Ottoman map of Tabriz, by Matrakçı Nasuh, circa 1537–38
Date	23–25 September 1585
Location	Tabriz, Iran
Result	Ottoman victory
Territorial changes	The Ottomans capture Tabriz from the Safavids

Belligerents
Safavid Iran	Ottoman Empire; Crimean Khanate

Commanders and leaders
(Safavid Iran) Mohammad Khodabanda	Murad III; Osman Pasha (Crimean Khanate) Gazi Giray

The Capture of Tabriz by the Ottoman Empire in 1585 was a momentous event in the Ottoman–Safavid War (1578–1590).

Tabriz was one of the main cities of the Safavid Empire, and their capital until circa 1555, when the Safavid capital was moved by Shah Tahmasp from Tabriz to Qazvin, in order to put a greater distance from the Ottoman Empire. During the Ottoman–Safavid War, the fall of the city followed some important Safavid defeats against the Ottomans, particularly at the Battle of Torches in 1583.

In 1585, an Ottoman force under Osman Pasha and Ferhat Pasha crossed into Iran and managed to capture Tabriz. The Ottoman forces also included Tatar and Circassian troops led by Gazy Giray, who had recently escaped from captivity among the Safavids. Tabriz would remain under Ottoman rule for the next two decades (18 years exactly), until the Safavid capture of Tabriz (1603), when it was recovered by Abbas the Great. It would again be plundered in 1618 by the Ottoman Grand Vizier Damat Halil Pasha during the Ottoman–Safavid War (1616–1618), and would again fall briefly to the Ottomans in the Capture of Tabriz (1635).

The next year the Safavid Emperor Mohammad Khodabanda sent his son, prince Hamza Mirza to fight the Ottomans, but the young prince was murdered during this campaign, and the city remained in Ottoman hands.

The city was administered by the new Ottoman Governor Jafar Pasha, who held the post from 1586 until 1591. He destroyed the royal Hasht Behesht Palace in Tabriz, an original creation of the Aq Qoyunlu ruler Uzun Hasan, in order to build the Castle of Jafar Pasha in its place a massive defensive structure, which the French traveler Jean Chardin depicted in 1673.

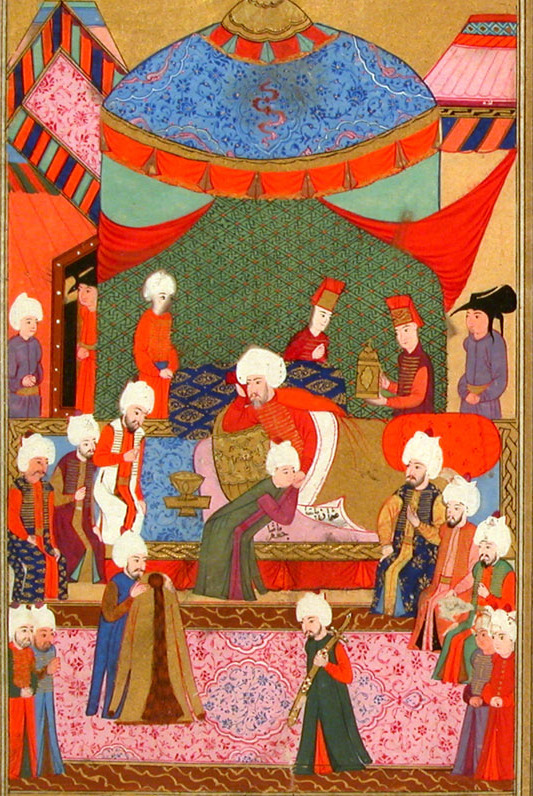
Jafar Pasha saluting dying Özdemiroğlu Osman Paşa, as he receives the robe of Governor of Tabriz. Secaatname

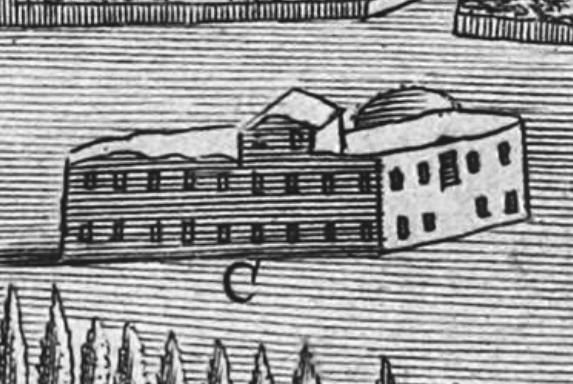
Castle of Jafar Pasha (detail), Tabriz (Jean Chardin, 1673)

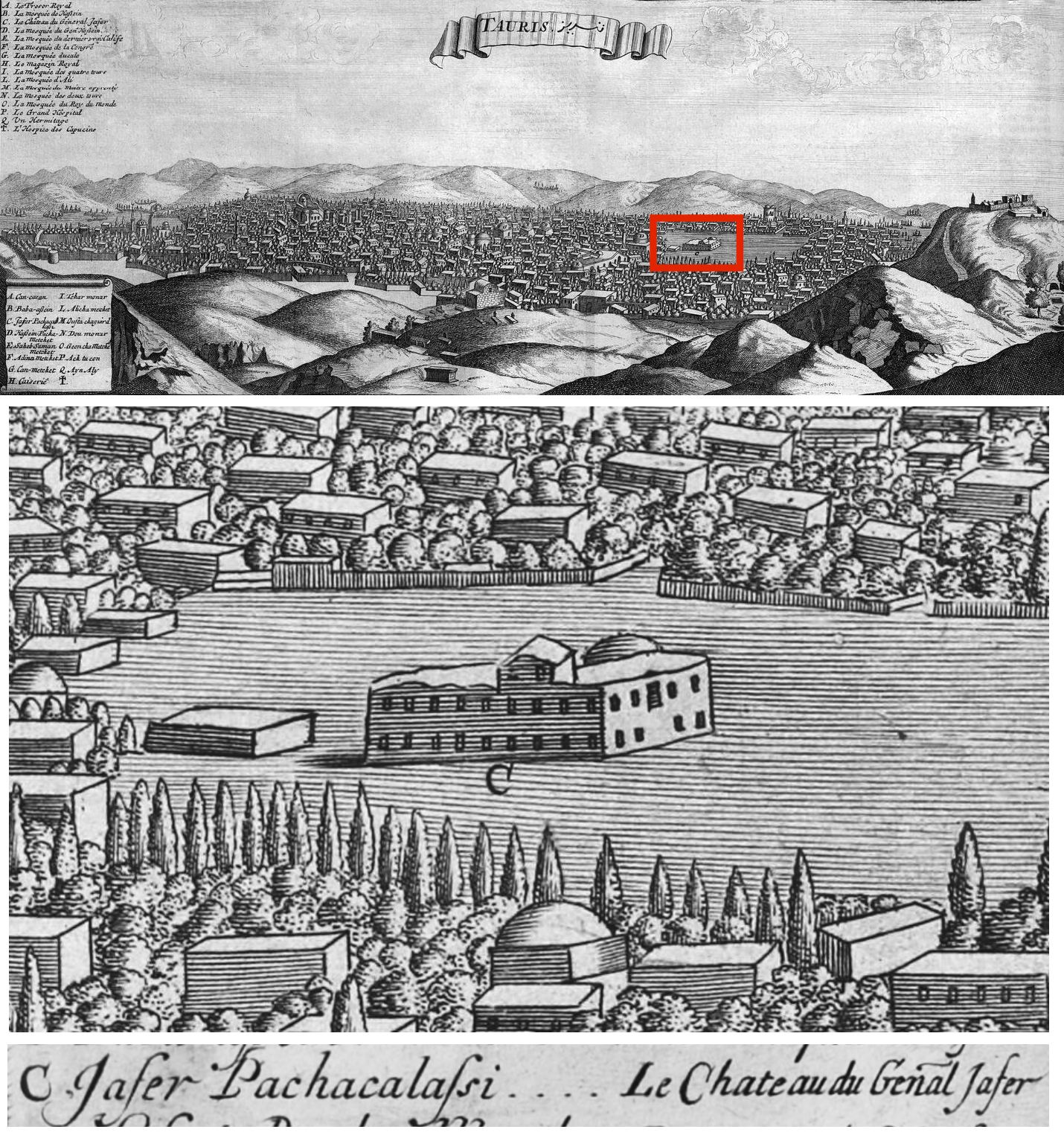
Location of the Castle of Jafar Pasha, Tabriz (Chardin, 1673)

== Sources ==
- Eravci, H. Mustafa (18 April 2023). "The Role of the Crimean Tatars in the Ottoman-Safavi Wars". Selçuk Üniversitesi Türkiyat Araştırmaları Dergisi (57): 25. doi:10.21563/sutad.1285102.
- Roemer, H. R. (1986). "The Safavid period". The Cambridge History of Iran, Volume 6: The Timurid and Safavid periods. Cambridge: Cambridge University Press. pp. 189–351. ISBN 9780521200943.
- Roxburgh, David J. (1 January 2005). The Persian Album, 1400-1600: From Dispersal to Collection. Yale University Press. p. 30. ISBN 978-0-300-10325-0.
- Savory, Roger (1980). Iran under the Safavids. Cambridge University Press. ISBN 978-0-521-22483-3.
