= Battle of Çıldır =

Battle between the Ottoman Turks and Iran in the 16th century

- Part of the Ottoman–Safavid War (1578–1590)
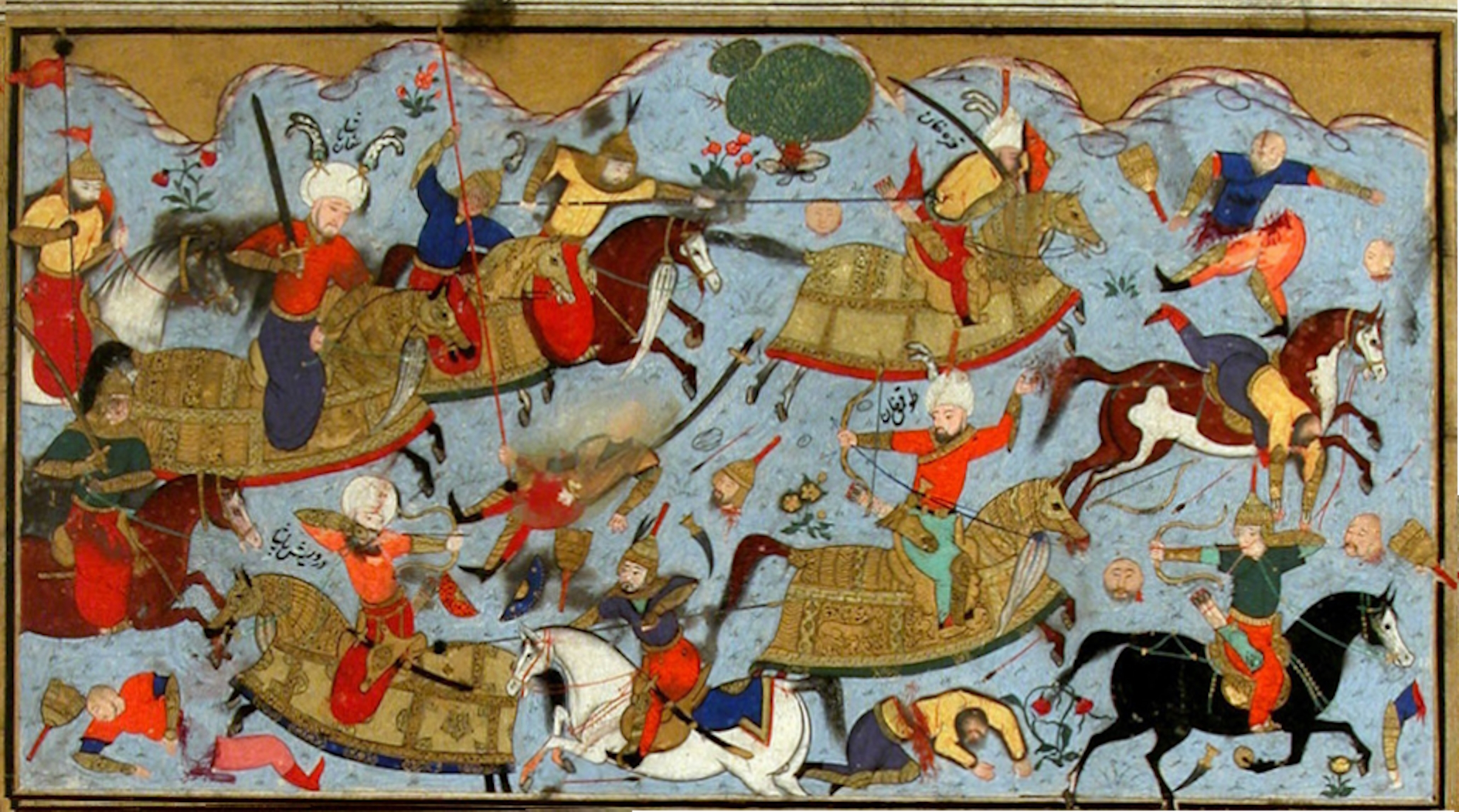
- Depiction of the Battle of Çıldır during the Ottoman–Safavid War (1578–1590). Osman pasha with sword (top left), Derviş Pasha (bottom left), Kara Khan wounded (top right), and Tokmak Khan drawing the bow (below right). Şeca'atname (1586).
Date	August 9, 1578
Location	Çıldır, near Kars 41.1289°N 43.1328°E
Result	Ottoman victory
Territorial changes	The Ottoman army entered Tbilisi and took control of the Georgian Kingdoms of Kartli and Kakheti

Belligerents
Ottoman Empire	Safavid Iran; Kingdom of Kartli

Commanders and leaders
Osman Pasha; Dervis Pasha (Governor of Diyarbakır)	Tokhmaq Khan Ustajlu (Governor of Erevan); Imam Kulu Khan (Governor of Ganja); Qara Khan (WIA)

Strength
300–400 initially, before the reinforcement of Osman Pasha	Safavids: 20,000; Georgians: 7,000

Casualties and losses
200–400	5,000–7,000 killed 3,000 captured and executed

The Battle of Çıldır was fought on 9 August 1578 during the Ottoman–Safavid War (1578–1590). The battle took place in Çıldır, about 150 km southwest of Tiflis, the capital of the Georgian Kingdom of Kartli.

== Background ==
The peace between the Ottoman Empire and Persian (Safavid) Empire after the treaty of Amasya continued from 1555 to 1578. When Murat III of the Ottoman Empire ascended to the throne in 1574, Tahmasp I of Persia sent presents to Murat III. But before the Persian delegation left Istanbul, the Ottoman capital, Tahmasp died (1576). The new shah was Ismail II who changed the peaceful policy towards Ottomans and began hostilities in the border area. Meanwhile, the governor of Lorestan, a part of Persia, took refuge in Ottoman lands, an event which further created tension between the two empires. İsmail II soon died and during the interregnum following his death, the Ottoman Porte decided to declare war. The war continued during the reign of Mohammed Khodabanda in Persia.

== Battle ==
The Ottoman army descended onto the Çıldır plain via Ardahan to conquer Georgian fortresses. However, approximately twelve khans, including Tokmak Khan, İmam Kulu, and Kara Khan, and a 20,000-strong Safavid force commanded by the Sultan, determined to prevent the Ottoman army from crossing the mountains, disrupt the campaign, and force them into the region. While Lala Mustafa Pasha and his main army were conquering fortified fortresses in Georgia, he sent a small advance guard forward for reconnaissance. As they approached Lake Çıldır, they engaged the Safavid forces lying in wait. After three hours of fighting, the sheer number of the enemy was realized, and Mustafa Pasha was informed. Dervis Pasha's reckless entry into battle with 300-400 soldiers resulted in heavy military losses. Realizing the seriousness of the situation, Mustafa Pasha sent Osman Pasha to Dervish Pasha's aid. Osman Pasha came to the rescue and the Safavids were surprised by their sudden appearance, providing support to the struggling Ottoman army. Osman Pasha ordered his troops to take precautions, sending his musketeers into a constant barrage of fire on the Safavid army. Thanks to Osman Pasha's bravery, a difficult victory was achieved against the Safavids.

The Georgian Prince Manuchar II Jaqeli, brother of the ruler of Samtskhe Qvarqvare IV Jaqeli, was present at the Battle of Çıldır, where he watched the Ottomans win from a nearby mountaintop. After the battle ended, Manuchar descended, and handed over the keys of the nearby castles, while at the same time he looked on the thousands of captured men of the combined Safavid-Georgian army being executed on the spot. Subsequently, the Ottomans took the rest of Samtskhe, and divided it into eight sanjaks. Manuchar II was appointed head of one these sanjaks, that of Khakhuli.

== Aftermath ==
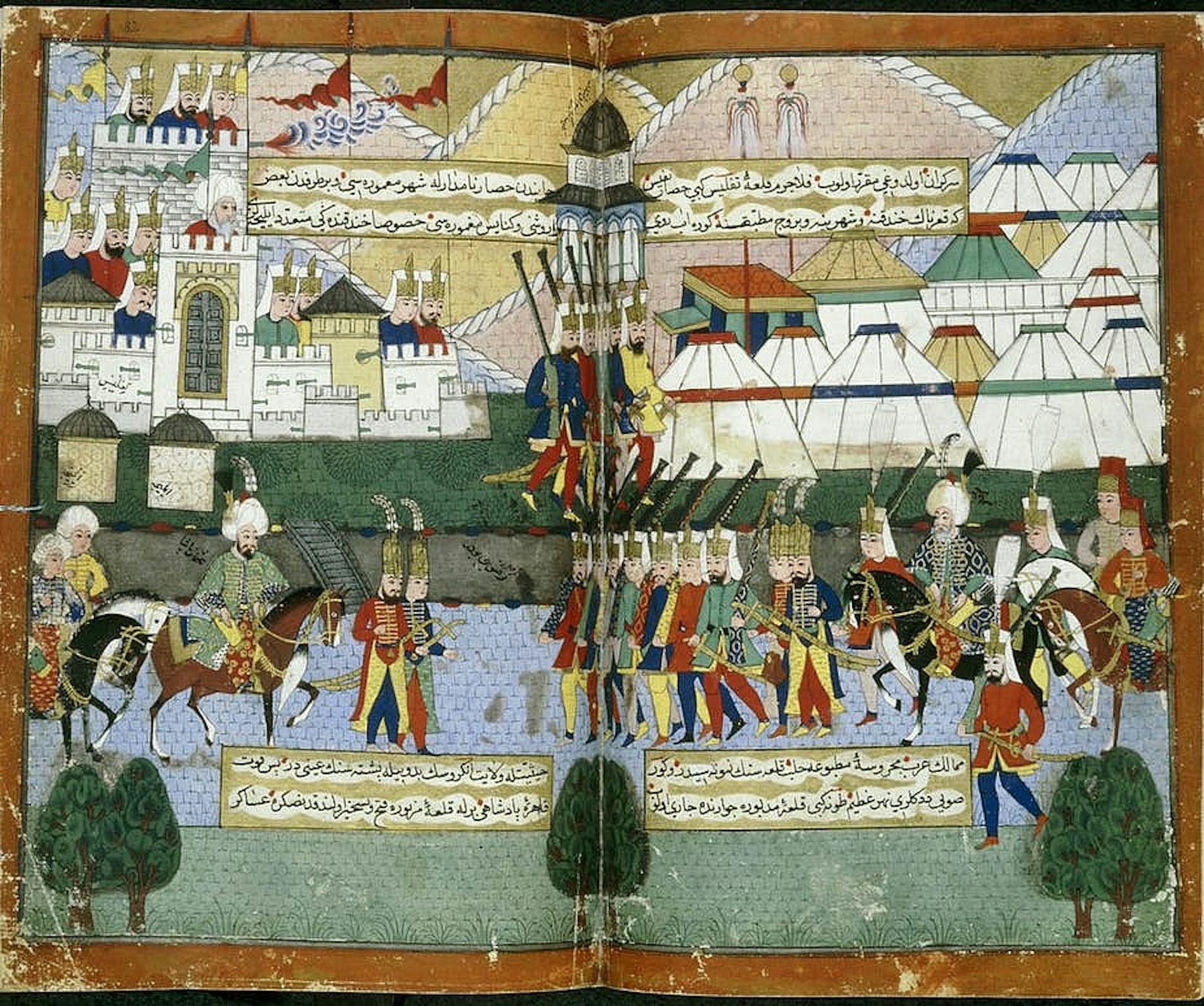
Ottoman army at Tiflis (Tbilissi) in 1578 (Nusretname miniature).

Although Persians tried to attack Ottoman supply units after the battle, they were forced to retreat and when a bridge was wrecked during this retreat they lost further troops. These defeats left the Caucasus to Ottoman conquest. Lala Mustafa Pasha soon conquered Tiflis, the Georgian capital. The next step was the conquest of Derbent (present Republic of Dagestan in Russia). By this conquest Ottomans were able to reach the Caspian Sea.

== See also ==
- Lala Mustafa Pasha's Caucasian campaign
- Battle of Torches
- Treaty of Istanbul (1590)
- Ottoman–Iranian Wars

== Sources ==
- Matthee, Rudi (2014). "The Ottoman-Safavid War of 986-998/1578-90: Motives and Causes". In Karpat, Kemal; Balgamış, Deniz (eds.). International Journal of Turkish Studies. Vol. 20, Nos 1& 2.
- Papuashvili, Tamar (10 December 2020). "The Childiri Battle According To Şecâ'atnâme" (PDF). 2nd Intertational Conference on Research in Social Sciences and Humanities: 55. doi:10.33422/2nd.icrsh.2020.12.08.
- Rayfield, Donald (2012). Edge of Empires: A History of Georgia. Reaktion Books. ISBN 978-1780230702.
