= Shikh-Murza Okotsky =

Shikh Ursharamov
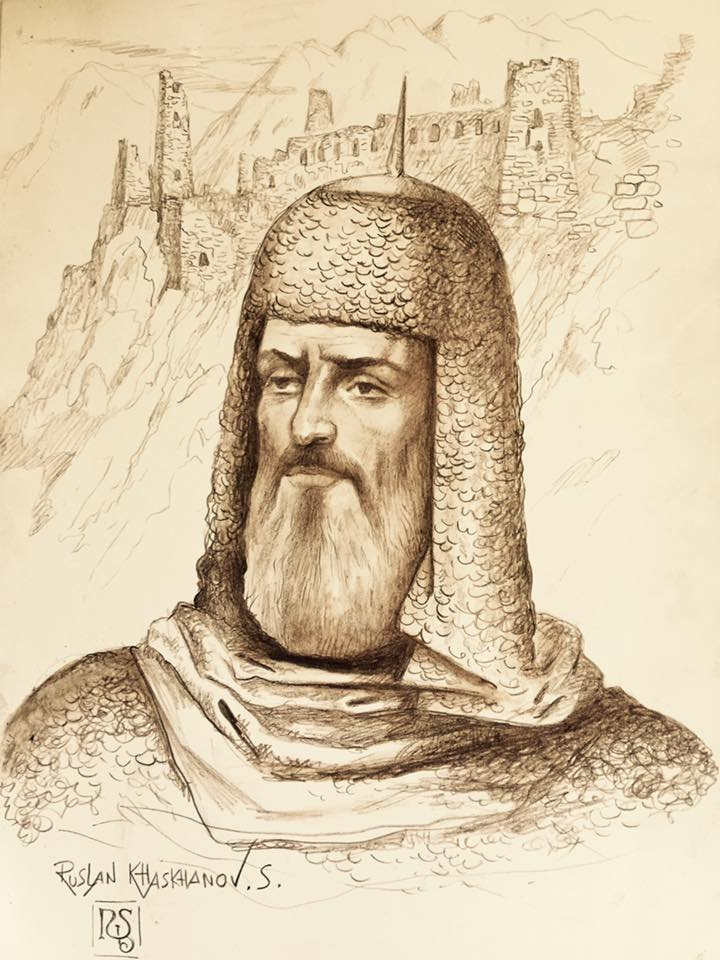
- Shikh Ursharamov (Unreliable portrait, made by Ruslan Khakhanov)

Ruler of Okotskaya
- Reign: fl. 1588 – 1595
- Predecessor: Urshary-Murza Okotsky
- Successor: Batai-Murza Okotsky
- Born: 16th century Okotskaya
- Died: 1595; Shircha Aukh
- Issue: Sons: Batai Shikhov
- Father: Urshary-Murza Okotsky
- Religion: Sunni Islam

Shikh Ursharamov, (Note: Russian: Ших Уршарамов) more commonly known as Shikh-Murza Okotsky, (Note: Russian: Ших-Мурза Окоцкий Chechen: Ӏовхойн Ших-мирза) (died 1595) was a Chechen prince who ruled the Principality of Okotskaya, generally identified with the historical Chechen society of Aukh. During the late 16th century, he emerged as one of the principal allies of the Tsardom of Russia in the northeastern Caucasus, playing a prominent role in regional diplomacy, military campaigns, and Russo-Chechen relations.

Shikh-Murza commanded a force of approximately 1,000 men, including Terek Cossacks in Russian service, and exercised influence across the region from the Darial Gorge to Derbent. He participated in the anti-Ottoman coalition aligned with the Safavid Empire, assisted in securing Russian diplomatic missions to Georgia, and formally entered into a vassal-allied relationship with Tsardom of Russia in 1589. He was killed in 1595 during a conflict with the Kumyk prince Akhmat Khan.

== Identity ==
=== Ethnicity ===
Ingush historians B. G. Aliev and M. Ya. Mirzabekov argued that Shikh-Murza Okotsky was an Ingush prince belonging to the Metskhal Ingush society. Nataliya Volkova also attributes Ingush origins to Shikh, citing the fact that Sultan Larsinsky, the Ingush prince of Lars, referred to Shikh as his "brother". However, E. N. Kusheva, the Soviet researcher who noted this reference, did not interpret it as evidence of a literal familial relationship. Instead, she wrote:

Let me remind you that in the article list of Prince S. Zvenigorodsky, Saltan-murza calls Shikh-murza Okotsky his brother. The Nakh origin of Saltan-murza and the population of Lars of that period has been proven in historical science and does not need an argument in the form of a conditional assumption about his “blood ties” with Shikh-murza.

Taking this circumstance into account, E. N. Kusheva introduces this turn of speech precisely as a feudal "brotherhood". Calling another feudal lord of equal status a brother was common practice in that era; even feuding kings called each other brothers. Therefore, Sultan-murza speaks of brotherhood to emphasize that his own status is higher than other nobles of Caucasus, and that he is instead a ruler like Shikh-Murza. Many historians accept Shikh was of Chechen origins, and Okochans are generally associated with the Aukh society of the Chechens. The son of Shikh-murza, Batai Shikhov, is also referred to as a "Chechen feudal lord" in historical documents.

=== Name ===
The name of Shikh, ruler of the Okotskaya and holder of the title "owner of the Okotsk Land", appears in numerous Russian-language documents dating from the late 16th to the early 17th century, including charters, petitions, and reports. Researchers have transcribed his Nakh name, recorded in these documents according to contemporary Russian orthographic conventions, into modern Russian in different ways. In his 1889 work, the historian and archaeographer Sergey A. Belokurov referred to this military and political figure as Shikh-murza or Shikh-mirza (pre-reform Russian: Шихъ-мурза / Шихъ-мирза), a form also adopted by Soviet-era Caucasus scholars, including E. N. Kusheva and N. G. Volkova. In documents from the late 16th and early 17th centuries, his title was used inconsistently. He was variously referred to as a murza or mirza—a title commonly applied in the Russian state of the period to Eastern feudal lords—or as a prince. Both murza and mirza appear with either lowercase or uppercase initial letters in the documents.

The Old Russian form "Shikh" may be a distortion of the word "sheikh". In that case, it would be more accurate to transcribe the ruler's name into modern Russian as Sheikh, and if the Okochans of the Old Russian documents are identified with the Aukhs, his full name may possibly be transcribed as Shikh Akkinsky. Some researchers write the name of Shikh Okotsky together with the Turkic title mirza/murza using a hyphen — Shikh-murza Okotsky.

== Biography ==
=== Political life ===
By the 1580s, the domains of Shikh-Murza, successor of his father Ushary-Murza, encompassed the northwestern regions of modern lowland-foothill Dagestan and certain eastern lands of Chechnya (centered around the Aukh region), extending down to the lower reaches of the Sunzha River. During the reign of Shikh, the population was fully Islamized, however it did not yet possess its own local Islamic clergy.

Shikh-Murza consolidated considerable military strength for the period, reportedly commanding around 1,000 warriors, consisting of approximately 500 Terek Cossacks who entered his service following the abandonment of the Terek fortress and another 500 of his own retainers. With these forces, he emerged as a prominent military and political figure across the northeastern Caucasus, extending his influence from the Darial Gorge to Derbent.

During the early 1580s, Shikh-Murza participated in an anti-Ottoman coalition of North Caucasian rulers aligned with the Safavid Empire. In a petition addressed to the Russian Tsar, he later recalled his involvement in the conflict, stating that he had "suffered much hardship" on the Tsar's behalf at Derbent (referred to in the source as the "Iron Gates") and had "borne [his] sword" there. At the time, Derbent was one of the principal frontier cities contested between the Ottoman and Safavid empires during the Ottoman–Safavid War.

=== War with Ottomans ===
After the outbreak of war between the Ottoman and Safavid Empires in 1578, one of the primary supply routes for the army of Özdemiroğlu Osman Pasha—operating in Shirvan since the autumn of 1578—stretched from Kefe through the North Caucasus to Derbent. The increasing presence of Ottoman troops in the region prompted the resumption and strengthening of relations between Kabarda and Russia. Taking advantage of the conflict, the Kabardian Grand Prince Qambolet Yidar appealed to Moscow for assistance, requesting that the Russian Tsar protect them "from the Crimean Khan and other enemies." The Russian government provided assistance. A military leader, Lev Novosiltsev, was sent along with a group of streltsy to construct a new fortress in the area. The Tsardom, seeking to strengthen its influence in the region even further, sought to secure alliances with the local nobility of Kabarda. A directive from Moscow summoned two prominent Kabardian princes—Mamstruk Temruqo and Qaziy Pshiapshoqo—to enter Russian service with up to 300 Circassians. They were ordered to arrive in Astrakhan by the feast day of Saint Simeon and then proceed to Ukraine to join Temruqo Idar before winter. The two princes were then instructed to move their troops to the southern borders of the Tsardom in order to carry out border service and to prevent incursions by the Crimean Tatars into the interior regions of the country. In 1578, the senior prince of Kabardia, Kambulat Idarov, visited Moscow.

As a consequence of these political maneuvers, the relations between Kabarda and Russia, which had been interrupted in the beginning of the decade, were restored in 1578, and Russian military presence in the North Caucasus was reinforced, threatening the Ottoman supply route running from Kefe to Derbent. In the same year, a Crimean army led by Adil Giray marched to Shirvan to aid the Ottomans in their war against the Safavids. The Kabardian princes and the Russian voivode Lev Novosiltsev allowed the Crimeans to pass through Kabarda. After reaching Shirvan, the Crimean army was badly beaten by the Safavids in the Battle of Mollahasanli, with their commander being taken prisoner. The remnants of the army, which amounted to c. 10,000, were scattered by the Russians on their retreat back to Crimean territory.

Following this, the Russians and their allies, operating near the Terek River, increasingly started harassing Ottoman convoys traversing the route. In 1582, a supply mission dispatched by Serdar Ferhat Pasha succeeded in delivering treasury funds and provisions to Osman Pasha's forces despite facing strong resistance. The convoy returned to Kefe under difficult conditions. By 1583, tensions in the North Caucasus had escalated further, as local groups including Don Cossacks and Chechen fighters increased their attacks on Ottoman movements along this route.

Following his victory over the Safavids in the Battle of Torches in May 1583, which consolidated Ottoman control over Shirvan, Osman Pasha was ordered by the Sublime Porte to march to Kefe, with the aim of overthrowing the rebellious Crimean Khan Mehmed Giray, who had refused to send troops to the Caucasus to fight against the Safavids since 1579. The Pasha departed from Derbent on October 21 and headed west with an elite force of approximately 4,000 soldiers, mainly veterans of the Shirvan campaign. On October 28, as the Ottomans attempted to cross the Sunzha River—a tributary of the Terek River known in Ottoman sources as Kanlı Sevinç Suyu—they were ambushed by a coalition army consisting of Don Cossacks and Chechens under the command of Shikh-Murza Okotsky.

According to Osman Pasha's own account to a Russian envoy, the initial Cossack force was almost entirely wiped out, with only around 200 fighters escaping. However, the Ottomans soon found themselves under continued harassment: over the next three days, the retreating Chechen and Cossack forces launched guerrilla-style ambushes from the forests, and set fire to large sections of the steppe, slowing the Ottoman advance toward Kerch and inflicting further losses. The Ottomans succeeded in repelling the initial assault and destroying a Cossack fortified camp.

=== Foreign policy ===
Although the relationship between the Okotskaya and the Tsardom of Russia had not yet been formally established, Shikh-Murza had already become an important regional ally of Moscow. In 1587, a royal charter entrusted him, alongside the Kabardian prince Mudar Alkhas, with ensuring the safe passage of a Muscovite embassy traveling to Georgia through the North Caucasus.

In 1588, Russian streltsy and Cossacks began constructing a large wooden fortress on one of the branches of the lower Terek River, completing it the following year. Shikh-Murza supported the construction and, with the assistance of the Tsar's Cossacks, reportedly captured the settlement of "Indili" along with seven additional fortified settlements. During this period, he also played an important role in securing alliances on Moscow's behalf with the Avar Khan, the "Black Prince" (Karakishi), and the Nakh ruler of Lars in the Darial Gorge, Sultan Larsinsky.

After Shikh-Murza Okotsky received various gifts, including a royal charter, Sultan Larsinsky requested Russian citizenship from Russian officials. The village of Lars had a strategic position, controlling an important section of the road in the Darial Gorge. Sultan-Murza, motivating his desire to enter into Russian citizenship, stated: "I want to serve the sovereign in my own way death, as my brother Shikh-Murza Okotsky." The Soviet researcher E. N. Kusheva noted that Sultan-Murza referred to Shikh-Murza Okotsky as his "brother". However, she interpreted this as an expression of their political status in the Caucasus rather than evidence of a blood relationship.

Shikh-Murza's influence continued to expand during this period. His political alignment was reportedly shared by many of the principal Nakh societies, and he strengthened Moscow's position in the eastern Caucasus by securing the allegiance of several regional rulers. Among those said to have entered his sphere of influence was Alkas, a son of the Dagestani Shamkhal. In October 1588, envoys representing Shikh-Murza arrived in Moscow alongside a Georgian diplomatic mission. The delegation, regarded as the first known Chechen embassy to Moscow, was headed by Shikh-Murza's son, Batai-Murza, who was accompanied by three attendants. The embassy delivered Shikh-Murza's petitions to Tsar Feodor I of Russia through the Ambassadorial Prikaz, requesting closer political ties and continued cooperation with the Russian state.

On 21 November 1588, Shikh-Murza's son Batai-Murza and the Kabardian prince Aslanbech Qeytuqo, were formally received by Tsar Feodor I of Russia in Moscow with full ceremonial honors. On 25 February 1589, Batai and Aslanbech entered into negotiations with several of the Tsardom's leading officials, including the treasurer Ivan V. Trakhaniotov and the senior clerks (duma secretaries) Andrey Shchelkalov and Posnik Dmitriev, concerning relations between Shikh-Murza and the Russian government. The formalization of Shikh-Murza's oath of allegiance, together with that of his ulus, took place in August 1589 when the Russian envoys S. Zvenigorodsky and T. Antonov arrived at Terki on their way to Georgia. Shikh-Murza was received in the ambassadors' tent, where the envoys presented the Tsar's charter, delivered the sovereign's address, and bestowed the gifts and salary granted to him in accordance with the Tsar's decree.

The ceremony effectively formalized the vassal-allied relationship between Shikh-Murza's domain and the Tsardom of Russia, with the arrangement being confirmed by a corresponding state charter issued by the Tsar. The successful passage of the Russian embassy to Georgia was largely attributed to the support provided by Shikh-Murza and his military forces. In the years that followed, however, the political situation in the North Caucasus shifted against Moscow and its regional allies, weakening the position of the pro-Russian factions in Chechnya, Dagestan, and Kabardia.

=== Khvorostinin's Dagestan campaign ===
==== Participation of Shikh-Murza ====
In 1594, Russian forces under the command of the voivode Andrey Khvorostinin, together with several allied North Caucasian rulers, including Shikh-Murza, launched a campaign against the Shamkhalate of Tarki. The expedition sought to establish Russian influence in northern Dagestan while fulfilling Moscow's commitments to its allies, the Safavid Empire and the Kingdoms of Georgia.

==== The campaign ====
After reaching agreements with the Georgian tsar Alexander II, as well as with the Kumyk Qrym-Shamkhal (Vice-Shamkhal, a relative of Shamkhal, who traditionally was considered as an heir to the throne), the Russian army of 5,000 people, under the command of voivode Khvorostinin, departed the Koisinsky fortress and began its advance towards Tarki. Shamkhal preferred not to engage in open battles against the Russians. Tarki, with its fortifications being not strong enough, was quickly occupied. Shamkhal did not negotiate and avoided direct clashes with the Russians, exhausting the latter with small raids and keeping Tarki in a wide blockade. The mountaineers did not give the Russians any rest day or night. According to V. Potto:

"Shamkhal was a supporter of the wait-and-see method of warfare and followed the Dagestani rule – To catch the scorpion by the tail."

The Russians' rear communications were targeted. Not a single supply dispatch could reach Tarki or travel out of it safely. Meanwhile, due to hot weather and the lack of food, a fever began to develop within the Russian army. The number of sick and wounded in the clashes with Kumyks grew every day. At the same time, the Shamkhal's army was continuously replenished with the arrival of new reinforcements. The blockade ring was gradually closing in.

The situation of the besieged became catastrophic, and Khvorostinin decided to withdraw from Tarki. On a dark night, Russian troops set out to move back towards the Koisinsky fortress. At first, retreating troops managed to withstand scattered attacks of the Dagestanis, but the arrival of the main forces led by Shamkhal himself forced the Russians to abandon their heavy loads and wounded.

In the end, only a quarter of the total number of the Russian troops, that had previously marched from the Koisinsky fortress, returned. The total losses of the Russian army in that campaign amounted to 3,000 people. According to some local tales, out of 1,000 Terek (Grebensky) Cossacks who marched, no more than 300 people returned home. The campaign ended with no success.

=== Death ===
Shikh Okotsky was killed in 1595 during a clash with the Kumyk prince Akhmat Khan, who sought to replace him and establish himself as the ruler of Aukh. According to historians V. B. Vinogradov and T. S. Magomadova, Shikh's young son was also killed in the same encounter. Following the death of Shikh, around 160 Aukhs fled to the Russian fortress of Terki in 1596 rather than submit to neighboring rulers. There they established the settlement known as "Okotsk Kuyu", and many entered Russian service. After this, the Okotskaya Lands came under the control of Saltan-Magmut, a pro-Ottoman prince from the Principality of Endirey.

According to Chechen oral tradition, Shikh was buried at the cemetery known as Shikh-Keshnash ("Shikh's Cemetery"), which is said to have derived its name from him. The cemetery is located on the eastern outskirts of the village of Shircha-Aukh (modern-day Kalininaul).

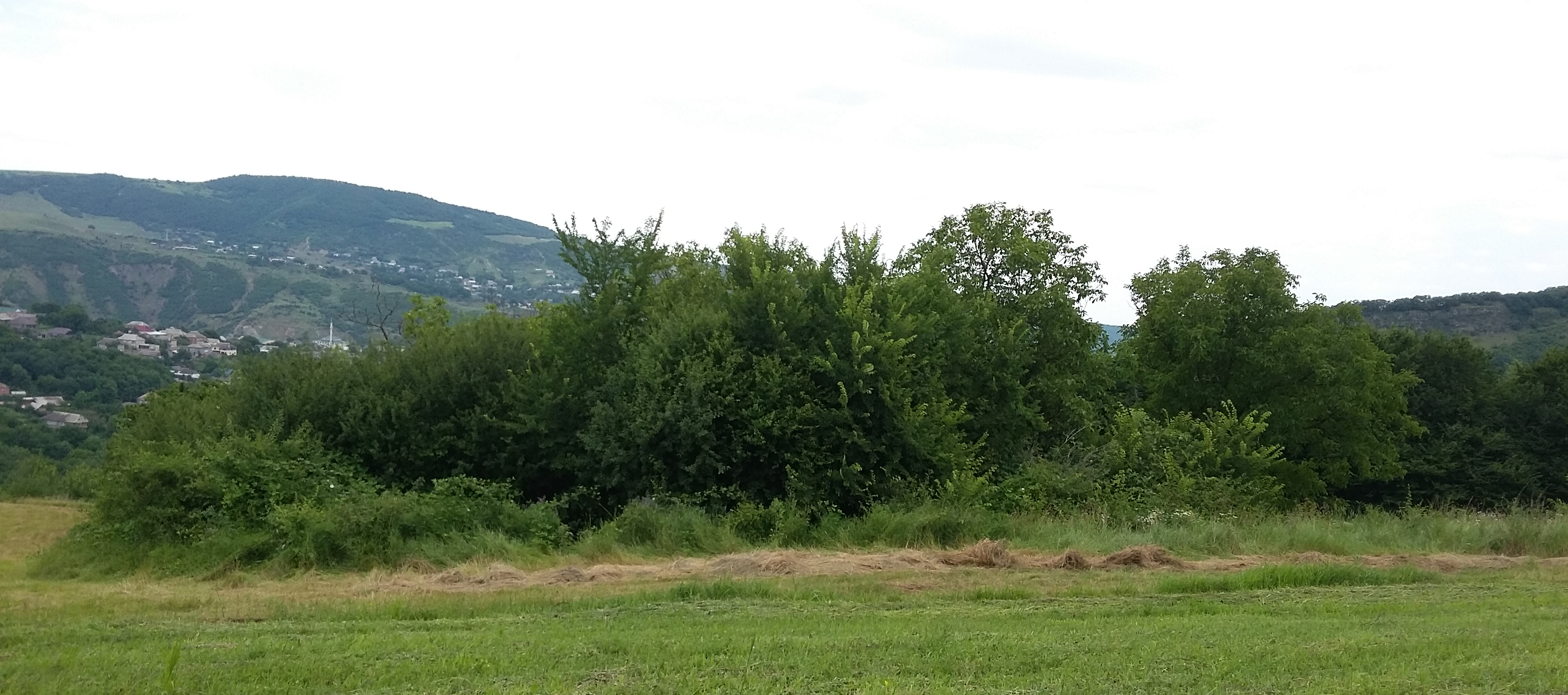
Shikh-Keshnash Cemetery, traditionally regarded as the burial place of Shikh Okotsky.

Shikh-Murza was succeeded by his son, Batai-Murza, as ruler of the Okochans. In 1605, Batai-Murza traveled to Moscow alongside the Kabardian prince Sunchaley Yanglychev and his retinue. The visit took place during the reign of False Dmitry I, by whom the North Caucasian envoys were formally received.

== Sources ==
- Gapurov, Sh. A.; Magamadov, S. C. (2020). Historical Figures of Chechnya (11th–21st centuries). Volume I. Book I. Political and Public Figures (in Russian). Grozny: AO "IPK Groznensky rabochiy". ISBN 978-5-4314-0422-1.
- Kusheva, E. N. (1963). The Peoples of the North Caucasus and Their Connections with Russia (Second Half of the 16th Century–1630s) (in Russian). Moscow: Publishing House of the USSR Academy of Sciences.
- Belokurov, S. A. (1889). Relations between Russia and the Caucasus (in Russian). Vol. 1. Moscow: University Press.
- Dolgieva, M. B.; Arapkhanova, L. Y.; Yandieva, U. T. (2020). "Ingushetia in the context of Russian foreign and domestic policy in the 16th-21st centuries". 250 years of unity of Ingushetia with Russia: Time, events, people: Collection of scientific articles based on materials from the international scientific and practical conference. Magas, 2020 (in Russian). Nazran: Kep. pp. 23–30.
