= Mohammad Khan Tokhmaq Ustajlu =

Safavid governor of Erivan in 1568–75 and 1578–83

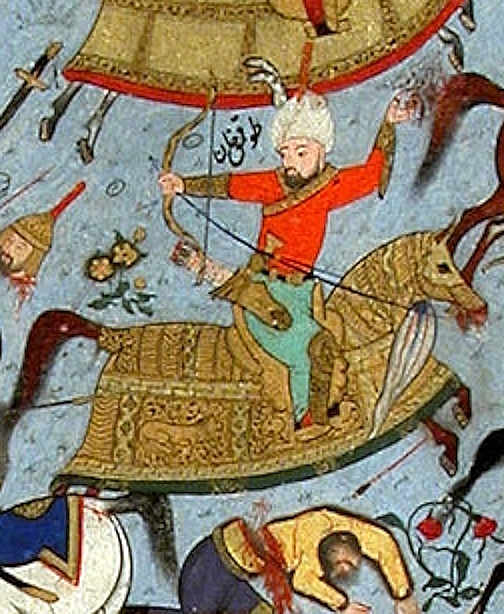
- Mohammad Khan Tokhmaq Ustajlu at the Battle of Çıldır in 1578. Secaatname (1586).

Governor of Erivan Province
- In office 1568–1575
- Monarch: Tahmasp I
- Preceded by: Shahqoli Soltan Ustajlu
- Succeeded by: Abu Torab Soltan
- In office 1578–1583
- Monarch: Mohammad Khodabanda
- Preceded by: Khalil Khan Afshar
- Succeeded by: Ottoman rule

Personal details
- Parent: Shahqoli Soltan Ustajlu (father)
- Occupation: Official, diplomat, military leader
- Tribe: Ustajlu

Military service
- Allegiance: Safavid Iran
- Battles/wars: Ottoman–Safavid War of 1578–1590; Battle of Çıldır

Mohammad Khan Tokhmaq Ustajlu (Persian: محمد خان تخماق استاجلو, romanized: Mohammad Xān Toxmāq Ostājlu), also commonly known as Tokhmaq Khan Ustajlu (تخماق خان استاجلو), was a 16th-century Iranian official, diplomat and military leader from the Turkoman Ustajlu tribe. He was appointed as governor (beglarbeg) of Erivan Province (also known as Chokhur-e Sa'd) in 1568–1575. Thereafter, he led an embassy to the Ottoman Empire. On his return, he participated in some judicial developments, and was reappointed as governor of Erivan Province in 1578. In the same year, he served as main commander at the Battle of Çıldır during the Ottoman–Safavid War of 1578–1590, where his army was routed. A few years later, in 1583, Mohammad Khan Tokhmaq's second tenure over the Erivan Province was brought to an end due to encroachments by the Ottomans, who controlled the province until 1604.

== Biography ==
=== Embassy to the Ottomans ===
Mohammad Khan Tokhmaq was the son of the previous governor of Erivan Province, Shahqoli Soltan Ustajlu, and was thus a member of the Turkoman Ustajlu tribe. The Erivan Province was centered on present-day Armenia, its provincial capital being Erivan (Yerevan). In 1568, Shah ("King") Tahmasp I (r. 1524-1576) appointed him as his father's successor. Several years later, shortly before his death, Tahmasp I sent Mohammad Khan Tokhmaq as an ambassador to the neighboring Ottoman Empire to congratulate Murad III on his accession to the Ottoman throne. Tahmasp I wished to maintain the cordial relations that were initiated by the Peace of Amasya in 1555. The embassy, comprising some 250 men and 500 camels, arrived in Scutari, adjacent to the imperial capital, Constantinople, in May 1576. They brought numerous costly gifts, including precious manuscripts and stones, as well as weapons and fine rugs. The most costly gift of all was an imperial tent decorated with jewels.

A grand reception followed, and the envoys were sent back with two luxuriously harnessed horses as well as 5,000 ducats. Both the ceremony and the construction of the tent are depicted in the first volume of the Shahanshah-nameh (dated 1581). The tent, considered to be a "magnificent piece of art" according to Zeren Tanındı, has not survived. Tahmasp I's letter of greeting, which Mohammad Khan Tokhmaq presented to Murad III, is in the archives of the Topkapı Palace. (Note: In 1568, Mohammad Khan Tokhmaq's father had also led an elaborate embassy to the Ottomans. The rich gifts carried by the 1568 mission included the famed Shahnameh of Shah Tahmasp.)

=== Judicial participation ===
During the short reign of Shah Ismail II (r. 1576–1577), the Shah ordered Mohammad Khan Tokhmaq, Grand Vizier Mirza Shokrollah Isfahani, and Mirza Ali Qajar to function as members of the orf court within the court of justice, in order to assist the incumbent divanbegi (chancellor, chief justice) Soltan Ebrahim Mirza, in giving judgement on individual cases involving finance as well as matters affecting the interests of the state in general. (Note: Willem Floor notes that the common law or orf court was one of two courts within the Safavid Empire, and was secular in nature. The other court, the shar'i court, was religious in nature and dealt with "religious and civil matters and litigation". The orf court was the most important of the two, as it was headed by the most important judicial official in the empire, the divanbegi, "who was the shah's representative in all matters of common law, in particular criminal law". Floor adds: "The orf court, in principle, dealt with all activities against the state, i.e. political (treason, oppression), fiscal (malversation, corruption), administrative (disputes between high-ranking officials), and criminal (murder, theft) crimes.") The mandates and judgements proposed by Mohammad Khan Tokhmaq and the others were eventually endorsed by the "supreme divan", with Ismail II's approval, and for a few months, they were put to practise.

=== War ===
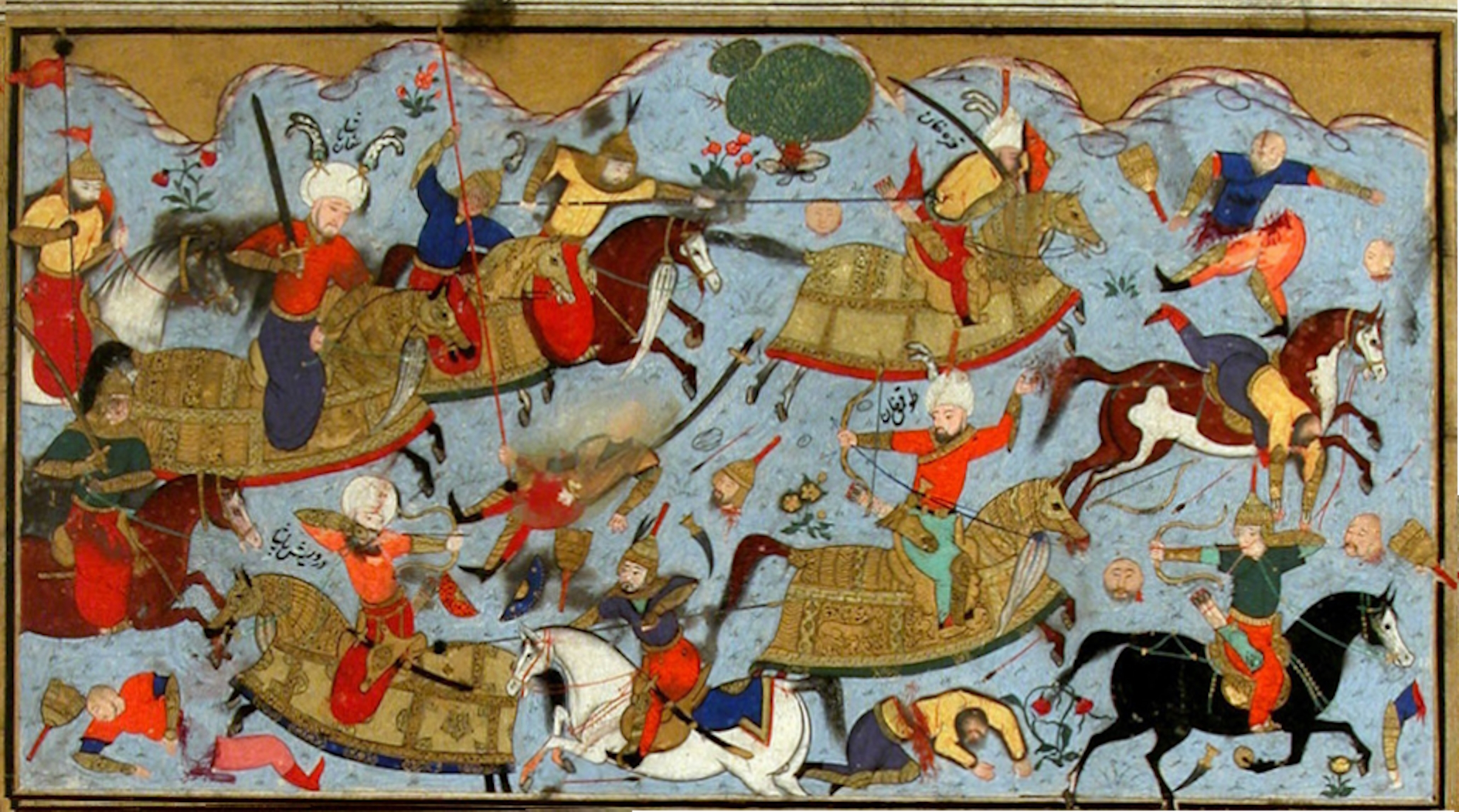
Depiction of the Battle of Çıldır during the Ottoman–Safavid of 1578–1590. Osman pasha with sword (top left), Derviş Pasha (bottom left), Kara Khan wounded (top right), and Mohammad Khan Tokhmaq drawing the bow (below right). Şeca'atname (1586).

In 1578, Shah Mohammad Khodabanda (r. 1578–1587) reappointed Mohammad Khan Tokhmaq as governor of Erivan Province. During the prelude to the Ottoman–Safavid of 1578–1590 the Safavids were well informed about the coming Ottoman assault but not about its magnitude. Mohammad Khan Tokhmaq was ordered by the Shah to recruit troops from all over northwestern Iran. Having assembled an army of some 15,000–30,000 men, he marched to the vicinity of Çıldır, not far from the Ottoman army, which was commanded by Lala Mustafa Pasha. The modern historian Rudi Matthee states that his spies miscalculated the size of the Ottoman army, "only counting the ones that were visible to them". According to Iskandar Beg Munshi (died c. 1633/4) and Juan Tomas Minadoi (died 1615), Mohammad Khan Tokhmaq, "emboldened" by the news from his spies, decided to attack. Munshi put the blame on the Qizilbash, stating that they ruined "their potential strength through disunity and internal bickering and of foolhardily rushing into war, taking on an army of 100,000 with a mere 15,000 troops rather than waiting until all reinforcements had arrived".

On 9 August, Mohammad Khan Tokhmaq and his men engaged the Ottomans. Heavily outnumbered, the Safavid forces were defeated, and some 5,000-7,000 were slain on the battlefield, while another 3,000 were taken captive and beheaded.

=== Loss of Yerevan to the Ottomans (1583) ===
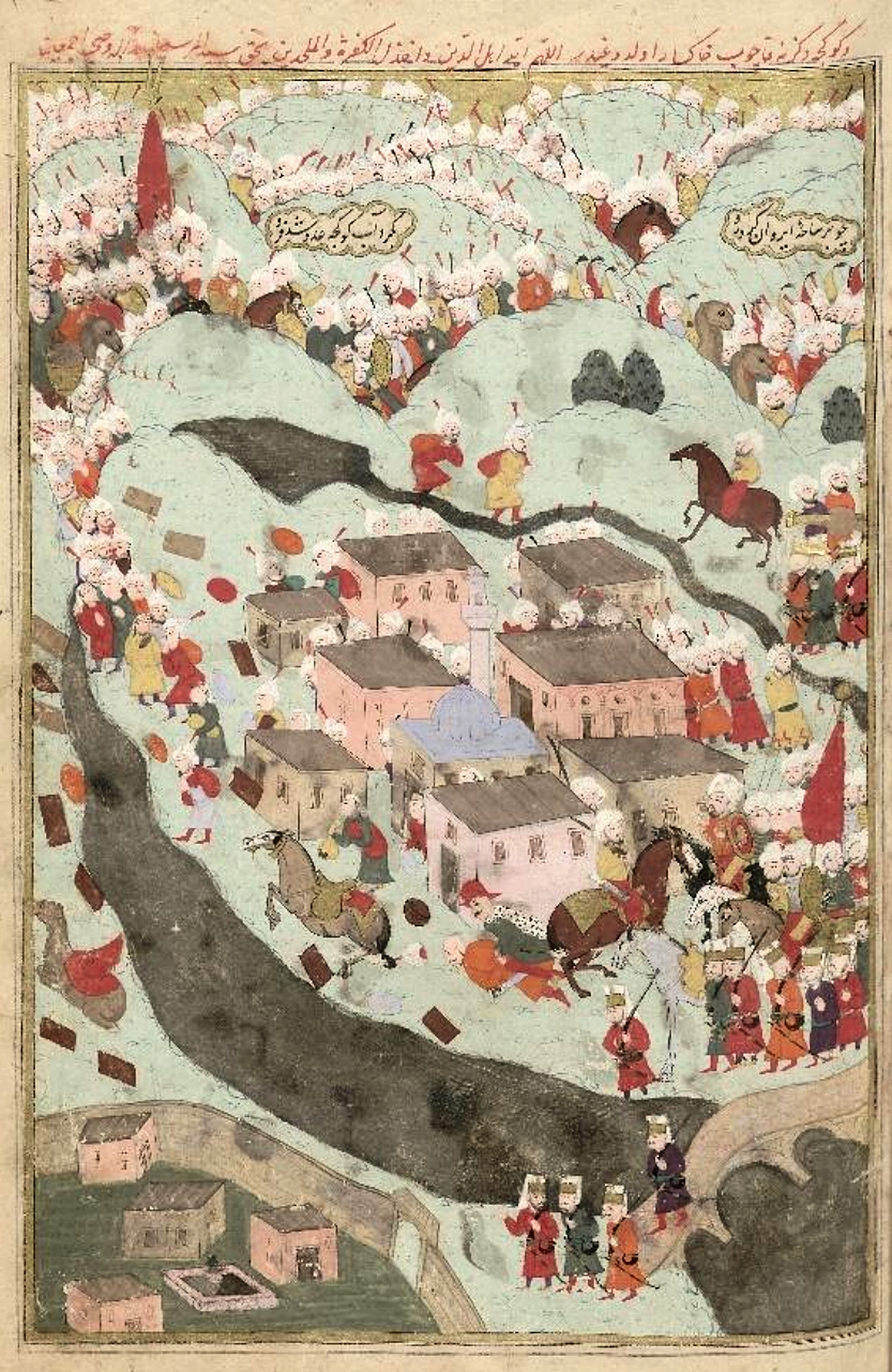
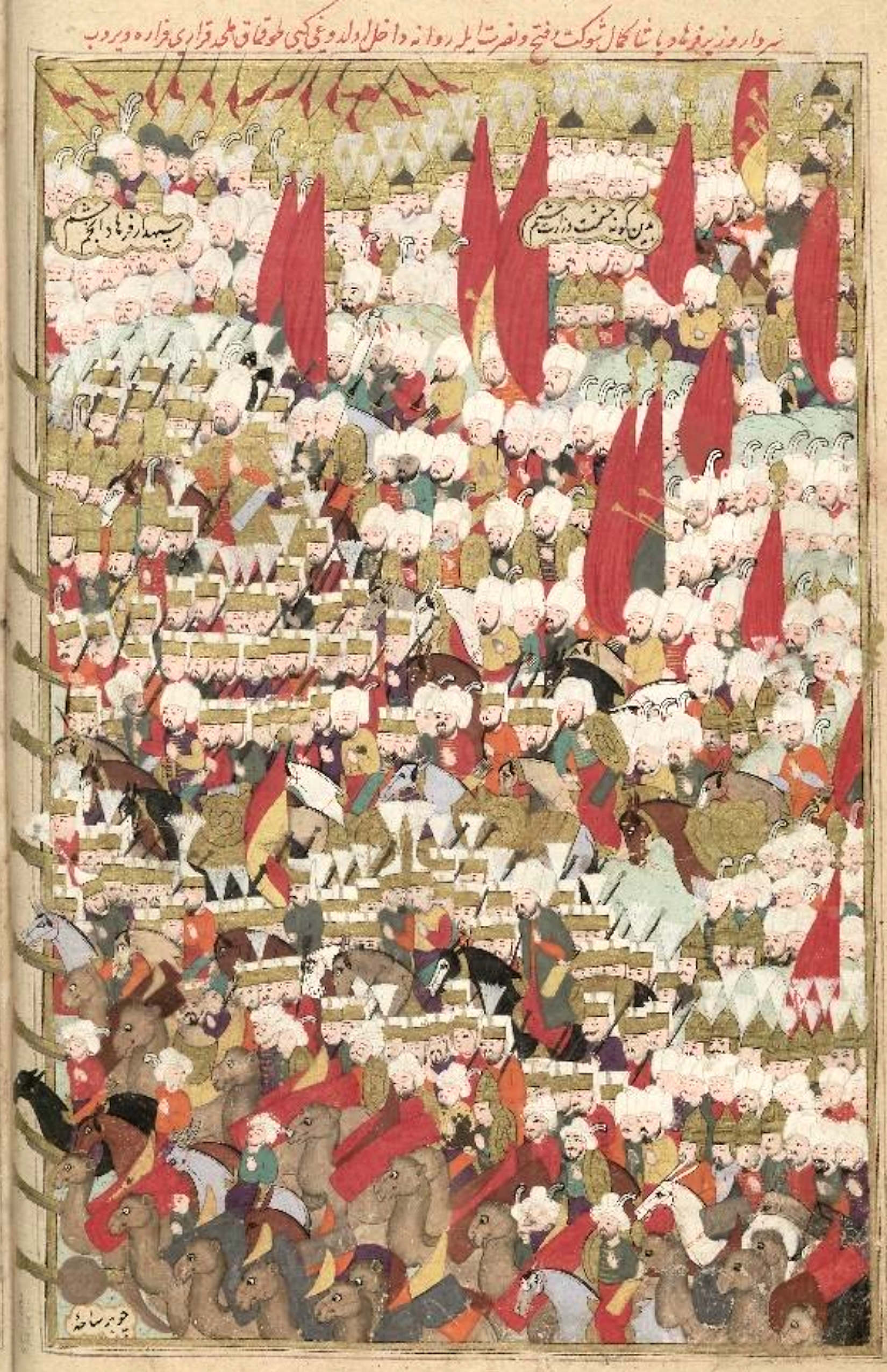
Ottoman commander Serdar Ferhat Pasha's conquest of Yerevan against Tokhmaq Khan Ustajlu in 1583. Şehinşahname, TSKM B.200 (1592).

Mohammad Khan Tokhmaq's second tenure over the Erivan Province was brought to an end in 1583 due to Ottoman encroachment, which resulted in an Ottoman takeover of the province until 1604.

A gholam (slave-soldier) of Mohammad Khan Tokhmaq, Behbud Agha, was a Georgian who hailed from a Kartlian noble family (tavadi). He converted to Islam during his service to Mohammad Khan Tokhmaq. Two of Behbud Agha's sons, Ali-Qoli Beg and Emamqoli Beg, together briefly served as governors of Kartli in the 1610s.

== Sources ==
- Floor, Willem (2000). "The Secular Judicial System in Safavid Persia". Studia Iranica. 29 (1). Peeters Publishers: 9–60. doi:10.2143/SI.29.1.565532.
- Floor, Willem (2001). Safavid Government Institutions. Costa Mesa, California: Mazda Publishers. pp. 1–311. ISBN 978-1568591353.
- Floor, Willem (2008). Titles and Emoluments in Safavid Iran: A Third Manual of Safavid Administration, by Mirza Naqi Nasiri. Washington, DC: Mage Publishers. ISBN 978-1933823232.
- Ghereghlou, Kioumars (2018). "Iskandar Beg Munshī". In Fleet, Kate; Krämer, Gudrun; Matringe, Denis; Nawas, John; Rowson, Everett (eds.). Encyclopaedia of Islam (3rd ed.). Brill Online. ISSN 1873-9830.
- Maeda, Hirotake (2012). "Exploitation of the Frontier: the Caucasus Policy of Shah 'Abbas I". In Floor, Willem; Herzig, Edmund (eds.). Iran and the World in the Safavid Age. I.B.Tauris. ISBN 978-1780769905.
- Matthee, Rudi (2014). "The Ottoman-Safavid War of 986–998/1578–90: Motives and Causes". In Karpat, Kemal; Balgamış, Deniz (eds.). International Journal of Turkish Studies. Vol. 20, Nos 1& 2.
- Papuashvili, Tamar (10 December 2020). "The Childiri Battle According To Şecâ'atnâme" (PDF). 2nd Intertational Conference on Research in Social Sciences and Humanities: 55. doi:10.33422/2nd.icrsh.2020.12.08.
- Tanındı, Zeren (2008). "TOPKAPI PALACE". In Yarshater, Ehsan (ed.). Encyclopædia Iranica (Online ed.). Encyclopædia Iranica Foundation.

Preceded by Shahqoli Soltan Ustajlu	Governor of Erivan Province (Chokhur-e Sa'd) (1st term); 1568–1575	Succeeded by Abu Torab Soltan
Preceded by Khalil Khan Afshar	Governor of Erivan Province (Chokhur-e Sa'd) (2nd term); 1578–1583	Succeeded by Ottoman pashas
