= Batai-Murza Okotsky =

Batai Shikhov
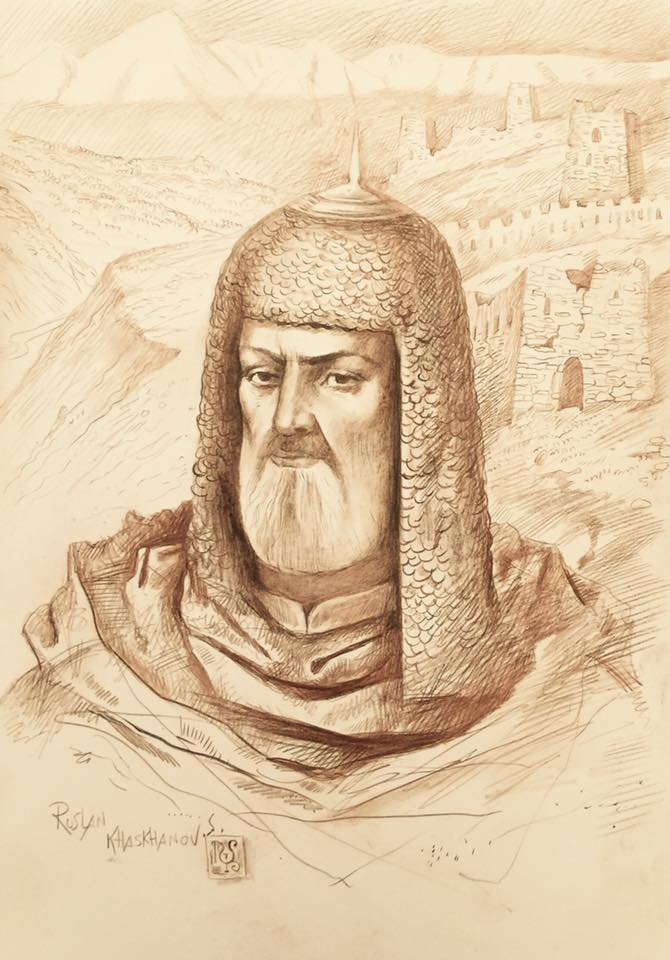

Prince of Okotsk
- Reign: 1596 – 1616
- Predecessor: Shikh-Murza Okotsky
- Successor: Kohostrov Beitemirov
- Issue: Sons: Albir Bataev
- Father: Shikh-Murza Okotsky
- Religion: Sunni Islam

Batai Shikhov (Chechen: Ширча-Ӏовх/Ширча-Аух), more commonly known as Batai-Murza Okotsky, was the third Chechen prince of the Principality of Okotskaya, son of the famous prince Shikh-Murza Okotsky. He was a Chechen feudal lord, native to the village of Stary Okokh

== Biography ==
In 1588, he headed the first Chechen embassy to Moscow

In November 1588, Batay-Murza Okotsky was received in Moscow by the tsar of Russia, Fyodor Ivanovich. Batay arrived accompanied by five Terek Okochans In 1605, Batai broke the oath given to the Russian tsar, which forced him to flee from the Terek city to the land of the Aukhov people in Okoh, after which all of his property, intercepted, was transferred to the residents of the city and the Cossacks.

In the spring of 1616, Batai-Murza again took the oath and was accepted into Russian citizenship, but in the following years he remained in the Okotsk land. The okoks of the Terek city continued to play a prominent role in maintaining ties between Russia and the mountain peoples of the North Caucasus. Between 1614 and 1621, serving okoks repeatedly visited Moscow, bringing various petitions "from all the Okotsk residents." The okoks were also sent "to all the mountain lands" in the areas adjacent to Terek with various assignments.

=== Family ===
He had several wives, one of whom was called Altyn. One of the wives, the name of one son is known: Albir-murza Bataev (Alburi). The source mentions two sons and two daughters from his first wife; how many children he had from the other wives is not specified. Batai-Murza's father was the famous ruler Shikh-Murza Okotsky, son of Urshary.
