= Ustajlu =

Historical Turkoman tribe in Iran

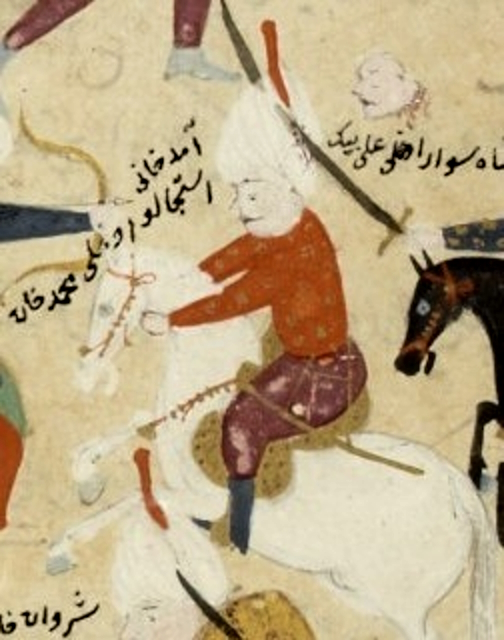
Mohammad Khan Ustajlu at the Battle of Chaldiran in an Ottoman miniature from Hoja Sa'd al-Din's Taj al-Tewarih.

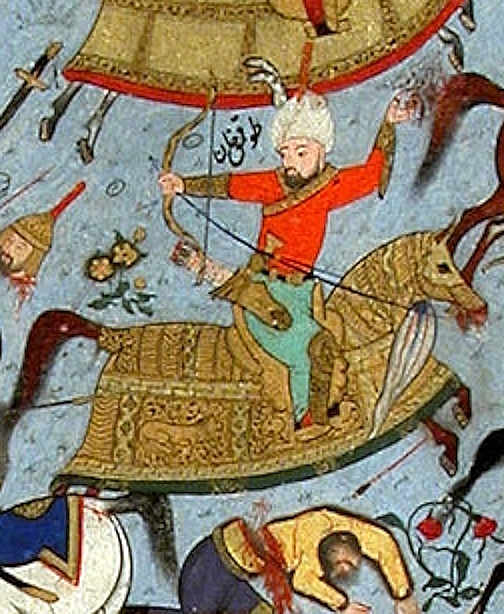
Tokhmaq Khan Ustajlu (طوقماغ خان) at the Battle of Çıldır in 1578. Secaatname (1586).

The Ustajlu were a powerful Turkoman tribe, with a main presence in Azerbaijan (in the northwest of Persia) and in Khorasan (north central Persia). They were particularly active during the early Safavid period in the 16th century. The Ustajlu were particularly powerful during the reign of Shah Ismail (1504–1524), as they held some of the most important positions in the Safavid state, including the position of qurchibashi (Commander of the Shah's guard regiment). Other powerful tribes (oymaqs) were the Shamlu and the Tekkelu.

Some notable people with the surname include:

- Abdollah Khan Ustajlu (died 1566/67), Iranian dignitary of Turkoman origin
- Badr Khan Ustajlu, Turkoman military officer
- Evaz Beg Ustajlu, Turkoman military officer
- Mohammad Khan Ustajlu (died 1514), Iranian military commander
- Mohammad Khan Tokhmaq Ustajlu, 16th-century Iranian official
- Salman Khan Ustajlu, Turkoman military leader

== Sources ==
- Papuashvili, Tamar (10 December 2020). "The Childiri Battle According To Şecâ'atnâme" (PDF). 2nd Intertational Conference on Research in Social Sciences and Humanities: 55. doi:10.33422/2nd.icrsh.2020.12.08.
