= Ali-Qoli Beg of Kartli =

Safavid official and governor of Kartli

Ali-Qoli Beg (died 1615) was a Safavid official, who briefly served as governor of Kartli together with his brother Emamqoli Beg, during the reign of king (shah) Abbas I (r. 1588–1629).

He was appointed as governor of Kartli together with his brother when Abbas I launched his punitive campaigns in Georgia.

Ali-Qoli Beg and his brother Emamqoli Beg were the sons of Behbud Agha, a Georgian gholam of Mohammad Khan Tokhmaq Ustajlu, the former governor of the Erivan Province. Behbud Agha hailed from a Kartlian noble family (tavadi), and had converted to Islam during his service to Mohammad Khan Tokhmaq.

In 1615, during the revolt in Georgia against the Safavid rule, Ali-Qoli Beg was killed.

== Sources ==
- Floor, Willem; Herzig, Edmund, eds. (2012). Iran and the World in the Safavid Age. I.B.Tauris. ISBN 978-1850439301.
