= Ottoman–Safavid War (1578–1590) =

16th-century war between the Ottoman Empire and the Safavid Empire

Ottoman–Safavid War of 1578–1590
- Part of the Ottoman–Persian Wars
Date	1578–1590
Location	Ottoman Iraq, Caucasus (North and South Caucasus)
Result	Ottoman victory: Treaty of Constantinople (1590)
Territorial changes	Ottomans gain the Safavid provinces of Georgia, the Erivan Province, Daghestan, Shirvan, Karabakh, Lorestan, Khuzestan, and most of Azerbaijan

Belligerents
Safavid Iran And others: Kingdom of Kartli (1578–1588); Kingdom of Kakheti (1578); Principality of Samtskhe (1578, 1582–1587); Principality of Guria (1583–1587); Don Cossacks (1583); Principality of Okotskaya (1583)	Ottoman Empire And others: Crimean Khanate; Lezgins; Kingdom of Imereti; Principality of Guria (1578–1583, after 1587); Principality of Mingrelia; Principality of Samtskhe (1578–1582); Shaybanids; Circassia; Chemguy Principality; Kheghach Principality; Hatuqay Principality; Besleney Principality; Zhane Principality; Kabardian Princedom

Commanders and leaders
Mohammed Khodabanda; Shah Abbas I Commanders: Imam Kulu Khan; Mirza Salman Jabiri X; Hamza Mirza X; Aras Khan †; Simon I of Kartli; Alexander II of Kakheti	Murad III Commanders: Sokollu Mehmed Pasha X; Lala Kara Mustafa Pasha #; Sinan Pasha; Özdemiroğlu Osman Pasha #; Cığalazade Yusuf Sinan Pasha; (Crimean Khanate) Adil Giray Khan (POW); (Kingdom of Kakheti) Prince Heraclius; Aledjuq of Hatuqay

Strength
130,000–150,000	80,000–100,000

Casualties and losses
40,000–55,000	20,000–25,000

The Ottoman–Safavid War of 1578–1590 was one of the many wars between the neighboring arch-rivals of the Safavid Empire and the Ottoman Empire.

Starting several years prior to the war and up to and including most of the war itself, the Safavids were experiencing significant domestic issues and rivalling noble factions within the court since the death of Shah Tahmasp I. The Ottomans decided to declare war in 1577–1578 to exploit the chaos. The war, despite swift Ottoman victories in the first few years and extensive support from the Ottoman vassal Crimean Khanate during several stages of the war, eventually became geo-politically and military relatively stable for several years with both parties losing and winning smaller battles till around 1580. It eventually had a turning point following the Battle of Torches on 7–11 May 1583 and the assassination of the Safavid generals Mirza Salman Jaberi and Hamza Mirza. Following these turns of events and internal chaos in the Safavid state, the Ottomans headed towards the eventual victory in 1590.

== Prelude ==
At the Sublime Porte, Grand Vizier Sokollu Mehmed Pasha was constantly urging against another war, but was overridden by the Sultan. The sultan however, pushed by the pro-war activists, decided to start the attack. Following Shah Tahmasp I's death, the central government in Qazvin had not been stable yet. The sultan saw it as a unique opportunity to conquer once again the territories that had been conquered by Suleiman the Magnificent over Safavid Iran decades earlier, but was not able to hold them for long. The sentiment for war was once again fueled by the fact that the Uzbeks had made an appeal to the Ottomans to make a combined attack from two fronts, as well as the Ottoman clergy that pushed the sultan to step up as the rightful defender of the Sunnis in the Safavid Empire. The latter pleaded that the sultan should seize the opportunity of Safavid weakness in order to bring a complete end to Shiism in Persia and its territories. When the Uzbeks started to attack the Safavids' far eastern territories comprising Khorasan, the Ottomans started the attack, effectively starting the war.

== War ==
=== Georgia and Shirvan (1578) ===
The Ottomans started the war, with the objective of conquering Azerbaijan and the Caucasus. They invaded the Safavids' Caucasian territories through Ardahan, taking Akhaltsikhe in August 1576, Tiflis in August 1578, while pressing Kartli to become a tributary vassal of the Ottoman Empire.

The Safavids, who were left unable to conduct effective campaigns on both the eastern and western fronts, were met with repeated setbacks that forced them back into Iran's heartlands. The seizure of much of the Caucasus had now given the Ottomans a direct land route from the east with their allied Crimean Khanate.

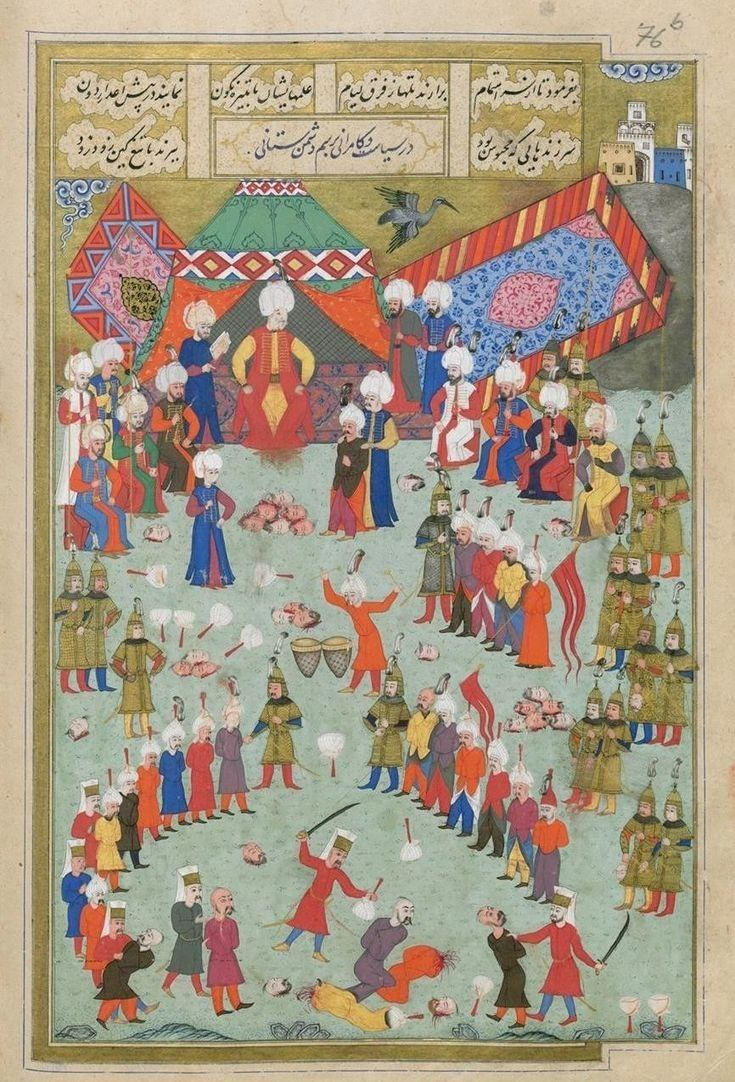
Ottoman capture of Shirvan from the Safavids in 1578, with execution of Safavid prisoners. Nusretname

Shirvan fell before the end of the summer of 1578. The Ottomans had now control of almost all territories west of the Caspian Sea coast, and this also opened the way for an attack on what is nowadays the core of Armenia and Azerbaijan, which were subsequently attacked in 1579 by a large contingent of Crimean Tatars, led by Adil Giray, who was captured in a remarkable counterattack led by Mirza Salman Jaberi and Hamza Mirza, and later executed in Qazvin, the Safavid capital at that time. In the meanwhile, on the far eastern Safavid front, the Uzbeks were forced to retreat due to problems with the Kirghiz-Kazakh tribes of Central Asia. As a result of this, the Georgian princes who had fallen under Ottoman rule several years before now changed their allegiance back to Safavid Iran, which they demonstrated by killing large numbers of Sunnis.

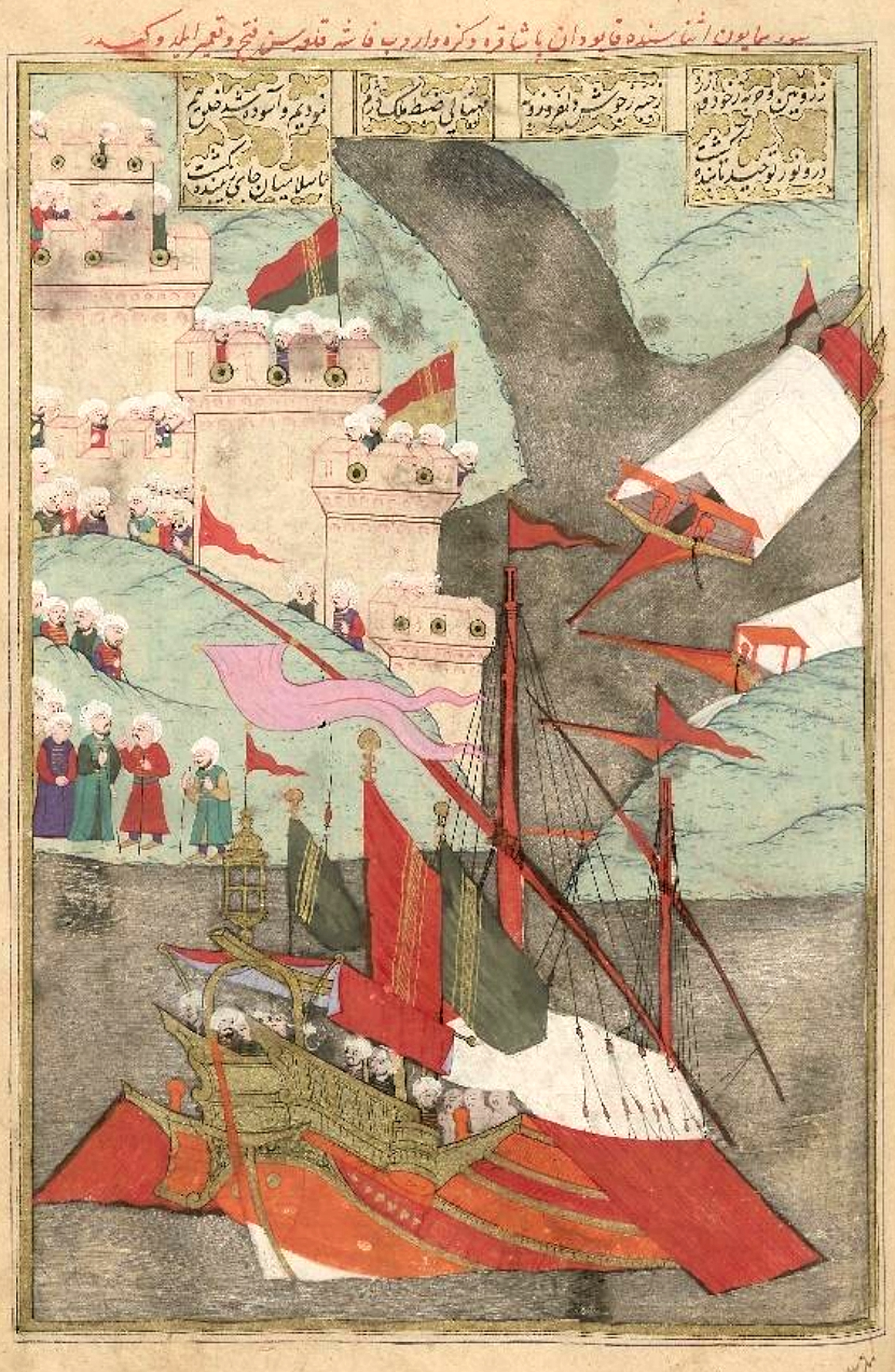
Ali Pasha's conquest of Faş Castle and repair of the castle in 1578-1579. Şahanşahname (TSKM B.200, 1592)

On the Black Sea, the Ottomans under Admiral Ali Pasha captured and reinforced the Georgian fortress of Farş.

=== Ottoman retreat in 1581 ===
In the spring of 1581 a combined Ottoman-Crimean Tatar force, led by Gazi Giray and Dal Mehmed Çelebi, was decisively defeated by the Safavids, which forced the Ottomans of Osman Pasha to just leave a garrison at Baku and retreat to Derbent. The Safavid forces under Piri Muhammed Beg and İmam Kulu Khan, harassed the retreating troops along the Caspian shore to the ramparts of Derbent. A diversionary action was established by the Ottomans, led by Gazi Giray, who made a foray to the area between Shabaran and Shamakhi. Following the betrayal of the troops of Abu Bakr Mirza, the son of the former Shirvanshah Sultan Burhan Ali, Gazi Giray was captured in the confusion and sent in captivity to the castle of Alamut where he remained for the next four years.

Nevertheless, the war headed for an Ottoman victory, which was becoming clearer and clearer following the Battle of Torches in 1583. With that victory, the Ottomans had consolidated control as far as the Caspian, including the Safavid possessions of Dagestan and Azerbaijan until the end of the war.

During the campaign in Shirvan the Ottomans tended to work together with the Sunni population of Shirvan and Dagestan. Lezgin tribal fighters actively aided the Ottomans in clearing Safavid garrisons from the area. This joint effort allowed the Ottomans to temporarily establish the short-lived Eyalet of Shirvan and Dagestan.

=== Crimean campaign (1584) ===
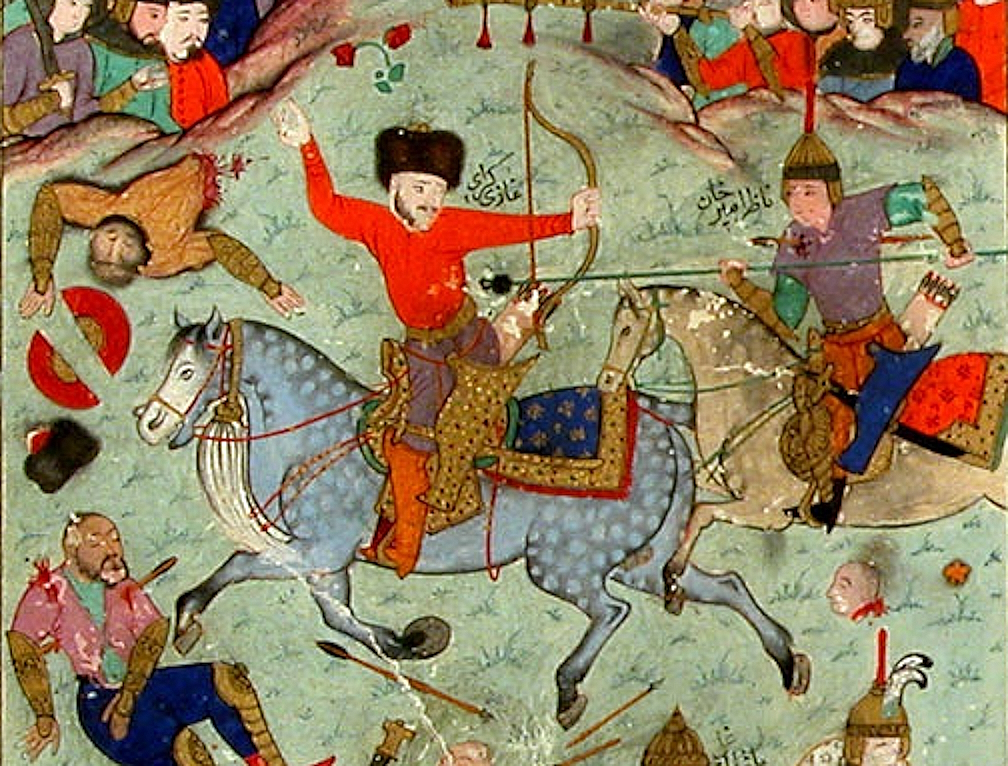
The Crimean Tatar Ğazı Giray being defeated in 1581. Secaatname

In 1583, the Crimean Khan Mehmed II Giray refused to send more troops to the Ottoman Empire for the campaigns of the Ottoman–Safavid War, depriving Osman Pasha of support against the Safavids in the region of Shirvan. This started the Crimean campaign (1584), in which the Ottomans led two military operations, one under Osman Pasha and the other under Kılıç Ali Pasha, to punish the rebellious Crimean Khan and to reestablish dominance in the Crimean Khanate. They reestablished control of the peninsula and enthroned a new Khan favorable to the Ottomans, Islam II Giray.

The reverses that the Safavids suffered on the battlefield also intensified several internal factional power struggles, in which Mirza Salman and Hamza Mirza were assassinated by assassins of the other faction within the court, with Hamza Mirza, son of Mohammad Khodabanda, being assassinated on 10 December 1587. With their deaths, the war efforts of the Safavids deteriorated even more.

=== Fall of Tabriz in 1585 ===
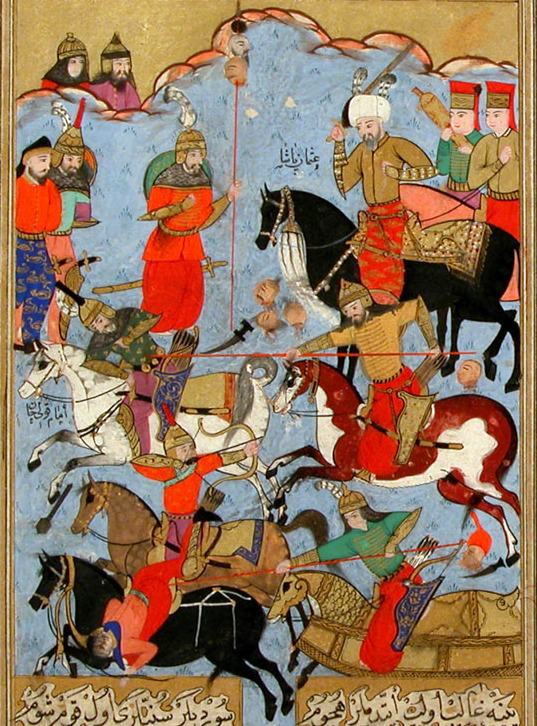
Ottoman commander Osman Pasha defeating the Safavid Imam Kulu Khan in the Battle of Torches in 1583. Secaatname

In 1585, an Ottoman force under Osman Pasha had managed to capture Tabriz, which would remain under Ottoman rule for the next two decades. They also took the city of Kars the same year. In 1587, Ottoman forces under the Governor of Baghdad, Cığalazade Yusuf Sinan Pasha, managed to take Luristan and Hamadan. That same year, the Uzbeks had concluded their own problems back in Central Asia, and had started to attack the Safavids' eastern provinces once again. It appeared that the very existence of the Safavid state was now in question. In 1588, the Ottoman commander Farhād Pasha advanced into Karabakh through Georgia. Many of the Turkic Qizilbash tribes, which formed the backbone of the Safavid military, submitted without any significant resistance in order to protect their own interests.

=== Treaty of Constantinople (1590) ===
In the face of all these difficulties -and even a staged coup in Qazvin by Murshi Quli Khan, of the Ustajlu Qizilbash clan- Mohammad Khodabanda decided to abdicate, favouring the throne to his son Shah Abbas I (who would be later be known as Abbas the Great). At the time he took over, all Iranian provinces in the Caucasus, Mesopotamia, Anatolia, and even in western Iran were occupied by the Ottomans, while the Uzbeks had seized swaths of its eastern territories.

Therefore, in order to settle matters at home first and to defeat the Uzbeks, he decided to sign a humiliating peace treaty on 21 March 1590, by which the war ended. The peace treaty, known as the Treaty of Constantinople, with the Ottomans in 1590, ceding to them the provinces of Azerbaijan, Karabagh, Ganja, Dagestan and Qarajadagh, as well as parts of Georgia, Luristan and Kurdistan. This demeaning treaty even ceded the previous capital of Tabriz to the Ottomans. Finally, Shah Abbas had to give as hostage to the Ottomans one of the possible successors to the Safavid throne: his nephew the young Haydar Mirza went sent to Constantinople in 1590, where he would die in 1596.

== Aftermath ==
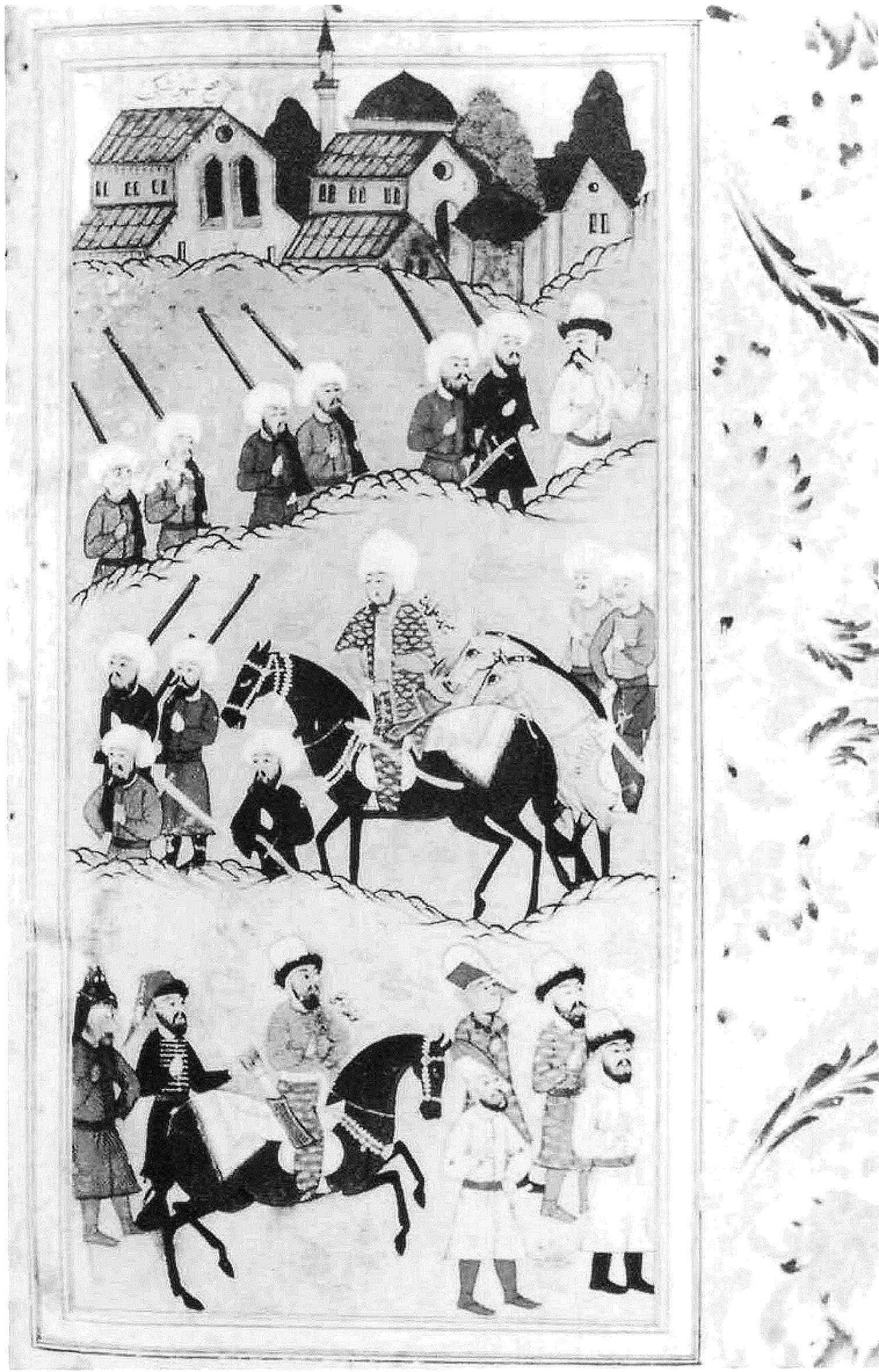
Ottoman troops under Lala Mustafa Pasha, and Alexander II of Kakheti with his Georgian troops (bottom) at the conquest of Sheki in Shirvan from the Safavids on 10 September 1578. Nusretname, Topkapi, H.1365

A peace of Constantinople was concluded on 21 March 1590, in which the Safavids were forced to confirm these Ottoman conquests, as well as promising to end Shiite propaganda in Ottoman territories and persecution of Sunnis in its own lands. By ceding many of its integral regions to the Ottomans, Abbas could settle matters in his crumbling state first, which had been neglected for so long by his father Mohammad Khodabanda. After having the matters settled and the state and military significantly reorganised, Abbas would declare war again on the Ottomans in 1603, crushingly defeating them and reconquering all lost territories by the Treaty of Constantinople.

The advent of the Ottoman-Safavid war temporarily deflected Ottoman interest from European affairs, where the Ottoman Empire had been active with the Franco-Ottoman alliance and the support of the Dutch Revolt, in an interesting episode of mutually-supportive relations between Islam and Protestantism.

== Literature ==
Several major Ottoman illustrated manuscripts were created to relate the war against the Safavids, such as the Nuṣretnāme ("Book of Victory") of the Ottoman bureaucrat Muṣṭafa ʿĀlī (d. 1600) detailing the campaigns of Lālā Muṣṭafa Paşa, the Şecāʿatnāme ("Book of Valor") of Āsafī Dal Meḥmed Çelebi (d. 1597–98) and the Tārīh-i ʿOsmān Paşa ("History of ʿOsmān Paşa") by an anonymous author reporting the campaigns of Özdemiroğlu Osman Pasha (d. 1585), governor of Şirvān.

== Main battles ==
The main battles and events of the war included:

- Lala Mustafa Pasha's Caucasian campaign
- Battle of Çıldır (9 August 1578)
- Siege of Shamakhi (1578) (9–12 November 1578)
- Battle of Mollahasanli (28 November 1578)
- Battle of Torches (9–11 May 1583)
- Battle of Sunzha River (October 28 and 30, 1583)
- Capture of Tabriz (1585) (23–25 September 1585)

== See also ==
- Ottoman–Safavid War (1603–1618)
- Crimean Khanate

== Sources ==
- Casale, Sinem Arcak (2023). Gifts in the Age of Empire. Ottoman-Safavid Cultural Exchange, 1500–1639. The University of Chicago Press. ISBN 978-0226820422.
- Eravci, H. Mustafa (18 April 2023). "The Role of the Crimean Tatars in the Ottoman-Safavi Wars". Selçuk Üniversitesi Türkiyat Araştırmaları Dergisi (57): 25. doi:10.21563/sutad.1285102.
- Kolodziejczyk, Dariusz (22 June 2011). The Crimean Khanate and Poland-Lithuania: International Diplomacy on the European Periphery (15th-18th Century), A Study of Peace Treaties Followed by an Annotated Edition of Relevant Documents. BRILL. pp. 105–106. ISBN 978-90-04-21571-9.
- Matthee, Rudi (2014). "The Ottoman-Safavid War of 986-998/1578-90: Motives and Causes". In Karpat, Kemal; Balgamış, Deniz (eds.). International Journal of Turkish Studies. Vol. 20, Nos 1& 2.
- Newman, Andrew J. (2006). Safavid Iran: Rebirth of a Persian Empire. Library of Middle East History. London, UK: I. B. Tauris. ISBN 1-86064-667-0.
- Roemer, H. R. (1986). "5: The Safavid Period". In Jackson, Peter; Lockhart, Lawrence (eds.). The Cambridge History of Iran. Vol. 6: The Timurid and Safavid Periods. Cambridge, UK: Cambridge University Press. ISBN 0-5212-0094-6. LCCN 67012845.
- Savory, Roger M. (1980). Iran under the Safavids. Cambridge, UK: Cambridge University Press. ISBN 0-521-22483-7. LCCN 78073817.
- Sicker, Martin (2001). The Islamic World in Decline: From the Treaty of Karlowitz to the Disintegration of the Ottoman Empire. Greenwood Publishing Group. ISBN 027596891X.
