= Principality of Okotskaya =

Chechen Principality during the 16th to 17th centuries

Principality of Okotskaya Okotskaya Zemlya Okochenya
- 16th century–late 17th century
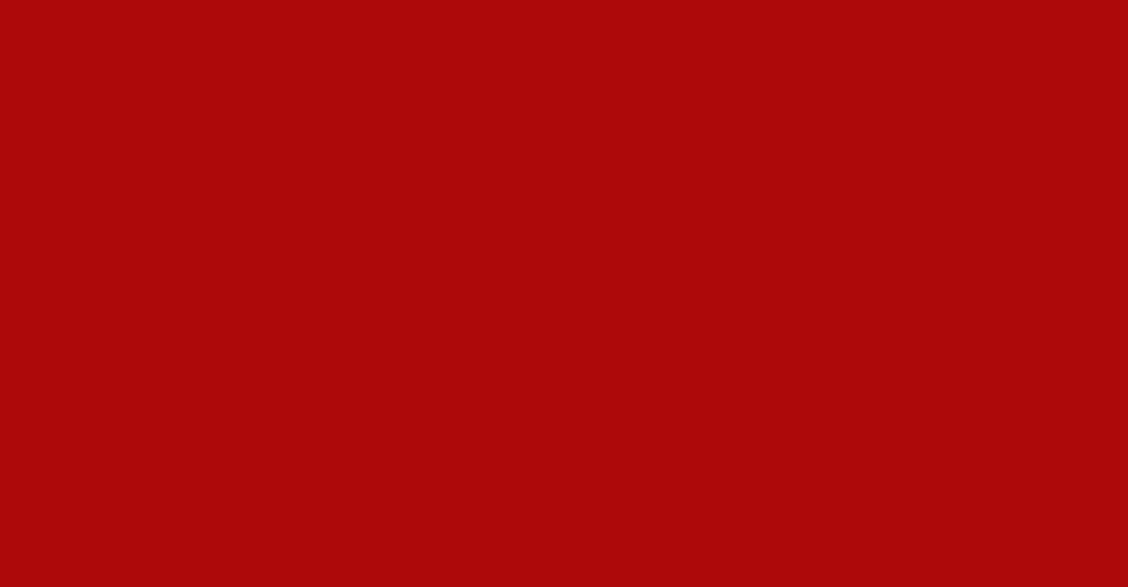
- Flag of the Nakh peoples

- Villages (taverns) and lands of the North-Eastern Caucasus
- Capital: Stary Okokh (Note: Meaning "Old Okokh")
- Official languages: Aukh dialect of Chechen language
- Ethnic groups: Aukh Chechens; Ichkerian Chechens; Terek Cossacks
- Religion: Sunni Islam
- Demonym: Mainly: Okochans/Okochens; Also called: List: Okokhs; Okukhi; Akozy
- Government: Principality
- Prince
  - fl. 1567 – 1580s: Urshary Okotsky
  - fl. 1588 – 1595: Shikh Ursharamov
  - 1596 – 1616: Batai Shikhov
  - 1616 – 1623: Kohostrov Beitemirov
  - 1623 – 1645: Albir Kohostrov
  - 1645 – 1653: Chopan Kohostrov
  - 1653 – 1680: Eltutar Chopanov
  - 1680 – 1686: Ibak Elmurzin
  - 1686 – 1680s: Elmurza Aleburiyev (Note: Also called "Yavla Aleburiyev")
- History
  - Established: 16th century
  - Declared loyalty to the Tsardom of Russia: 1588
  - Disestablished: late 17th century
- Today part of: Russia: Chechnya; Dagestan

Principality of Okotskaya, also called Okochenya, or Okotskaya Zemlya, (Note: meaning "Land of the Okoks" (Aukhs)) (Note: Less commonly known as Akhotskaya, Okoki, Okokh, Okochane, Okochany, Okuki, Okuchane, Akozy, Akochane) was a 16th and 17th century ethnically Chechen principality made up of Aukh teips, known in Russian sources as the Okokhi. The name frequently appeared alongside other regions of the northeastern Caucasus, which were collectively described under the common designation "Mountain lands" (Gorskie Zemlya).

== Localization ==
=== Origin ===
Most researchers, including the Soviet Caucasus specialist and historian Ekaterina Nikolaevna Kusheva, identify the Okochans mentioned in Russian documentary sources with the Akkintsy-Aukhs, an ethnic group that formed part of the ethnogenesis of modern Chechens and was at that time united within the traditional Nakh "society". Their historical homeland is generally associated with the region of Arenan-Akka (later known as Aukh). Kusheva dates the migration of the Akkintsy from the mountainous Aukh area to the plains along the Michik River, under the protection of the Avar Khan, to approximately the period between 1550 and 1570.

=== Lands ===
The Chechen Principality of Okotskaya was centered around the Aukh region. It reached its peak during the reign of Shikh-Murza Okotsky, where the lands of Okochenya included Ichkeria, Aukh, and briefly expanding into northern Dagestan. Shikh's influence was spread throughout all of northeastern caucasus from Derbent to the Darial Gorge. In the sphere of his influence were: The Avar Khanate, Gazikumukh, Ingush tribes and Dargins

== History ==
In the second half of the 16th century, the rulers of Okotskaya Land established close relations with the Russian state. During the 1580s, Shikh Okotsky emerged as one of Russia’s most influential allies in the Caucasus, with his authority extending over Aukh, the lowland regions of Chechnya, and parts of northern Dagestan. Following the assassination of Shikh-murza in 1596, approximately 160 Okotsky families fled to the city of Terek, where they founded the Okotsk settlement. The settlement was later replenished by migrants from Chechnya and other Mountain lands and continued to exist until the 19th century.

After the end of the Time of Troubles and the accession of Mikhail Romanov, Moscow renewed its political relations with the peoples of the North Caucasus. Several Kabardian and Dagestani rulers subsequently received royal charters confirming Moscow's patronage and protection. Alongside a letter of congratulation, the envoys also brought a written petition addressed to the tsar. One of the ambassadors, Akhmat Inalov, reported to Moscow: "And I, your serf Akhmetok, have been chosen by my comrades to inquire about your royal majesty and your continued good health." He appears in the sources as the head of this small Chechen embassy in Moscow. On behalf of 160 Okochans, the petition was signed by Akhmat Inalov together with 19 of the most respected members of the diaspora, referred to in the document as the “best people of the Okochans.” The petition opens with a list of the signatories addressed to Tsar and Grand Prince Mikhail Fedorovich of all Russia, naming the Okochans of Terek city, including Urak Itinov, Taburka Urakov, Adyga Biberdin, Urak Molodoy, Kelya Ilziyarov, Didey Mustaparov, Yuzyashar Yanbekov, Batyr Akin, Okhmat Inalov, Odya Yatekov, Kentia Kerbekov, Churyubash Alebekov, Tabura Urakov, Urak Yanmekov, Terbulat Biberdin, Arakhcha Machyukin, Smailka Ichin, and Psenchey Chorobashov, together with their 160 comrades, who "bow their heads." The main aim of the petition was to describe the difficulties of their service and to request the issuance of bread and monetary salaries that the Terek administration reportedly owed them.

On 6 September 1614, the Okotsk envoys Akhmat and Achelei were received by Tsar Michael. In Moscow, the importance of their service in a distant frontier town was clearly understood, as the Chechen enclave on the border held a significant role in the development of Russian–Caucasian relations. The envoys were formally presented to the tsar by the ambassadorial clerk of the Posolsky Prikaz, Pyotr Tretyakov. The mission proved successful, as their petition was approved. A tsarist decree granting salaries to the Okochans was issued and dispatched to the Terek voivodes, sent back together with Akhmat and Achelei.

In the 17th century, documents of the Ambassadorial Prikaz record the Okochans in service to the Russian Tsardom, often referring to them under the designation Okochenya. The list of articles from the 1650–1652 embassy of the stolnik N. Tolochanov and the clerk A. Ievlev to the Kingdom of Imereti mentions the Okochans twice. According to the document, 60 Okoki took part in escorting the embassy from Terek, together with Terek service people, 50 mounted archers, and 30 newly baptized individuals. The same source also refers to the Okoki during the march "from Zazaruka (Note: A village on the very east of the Terek river and the west of Didoeti-Dagestan used to reffer to the Durdzuks by Georgians) to Bolkhar (Note: Balkaria – Land where the Balkar peoples lived.)", where, during the crossing of the Psygansu River, many horses reportedly fell while carrying pack loads.

== Use of the toponym ==
Beginning in the 1580s, various Mountain lands were increasingly mentioned in the reports of the Terek voivodes and in documents concerning the Russian government's diplomatic relations with the Caucasus that have survived to the present day. In some cases, the sources contain entire lists of these territories. The recorded forms of their names remained relatively stable, allowing modern researchers to identify the range of Mountain lands that fell within the sphere of influence and contact of the Russian administration of the Terek town, and, with varying degrees of certainty, to correlate these Russian exotoponyms with historical Nakh territories.

Old Russian sources preserve several variants of the toponym Okotskaya zemlya, including the less common forms Akotskaya zemlya and Akhotskaya zemlya. Alongside the term zemlya, meaning a particular land or country, documents also employed the archaic word zemlitsa with a similar meaning. In the Russian vocabulary of the period, state formations or territories were often designated by the name of the people inhabiting them; accordingly, synonyms for Okotskaya zemlya included Okoki, Okokhi, Okochane, Okochany, Okochenya, Okuki, and Okuchane, while the forms Akozy and Akochane appear more rarely. In Old Russian orthography, such ethnonyms were typically written with capital letters.

== Sources ==
- Belokurov, Sergey Alekseyevich (1889). Relations of Russia with the Caucasus (materials extracted from the Moscow Main Archive of the Ministry of Foreign Affairs of the Russian Empire). Issue 1, 1578–1613. Moscow: University Printing House.
- Kusheva1, Yekaterina Nikolayevna (1963). Peoples of the North Caucasus and Their Relations with Russia (second half of the 16th century–1630s). Moscow: USSR Academy of Sciences Publishing House.
- Zhurtova, A. A.; Maksimchik, A. N. (2017). Historiography of Russian–Caucasian Relations in the 16th–19th Centuries: Two Approaches to Understanding the Problem (PDF). Vladikavkaz: SOIGSI VNC RAN. ISBN 978-5-91480-280-3.
- Ageeva, Ruf Alexandrovna (2000). What Tribe and Clan Are We From? Peoples of Russia: Names and Destinies. Moscow: Academia. ISBN 5-87444-033-X.
- Boguslavsky, Vladimir Volfovich (2004). Slavic Encyclopedia. 17th Century. Vol. 2. Moscow: Olma-Press. ISBN 5-224-03660-7.
- Kusheva, Yekaterina Nikolayevna, ed. (1997). Russo–Chechen Relations. Second Half of the 16th–17th Century. Moscow: Vostochnaya Literatura. ISBN 5-02-017955-8.
- Tolstov, Sergey Pavlovich (1960). Peoples of the Caucasus. Peoples of the World: Ethnographic Essays. Vol. 1. Moscow: Publishing House of the USSR Academy of Sciences.
- Vinogradov, Vitaly Borisovich (1980). Time, Mountains, People: A Book of Essays and Local History Reports. Chechen-Ingush Book Publishing House.
- Bliyev, Mark Maksimovich (2004). Russia and the Highlanders of the Greater Caucasus on the Path to Civilization. Mysl. ISBN 5-244-01004-2.
- Tishkov, Valery Alexandrovich (1999). Peoples and Religions of the World: Encyclopedia. Moscow: Great Russian Encyclopedia. ISBN 5-85270-155-6.
- Turkayev, Khasan Vakhitovich (2015). Chechens in the History, Politics, Science and Culture of Russia: Studies and Documents. Moscow: Nauka. ISBN 978-5-02-038056-1.
- Cherepnin, Lev Vladimirovich (1976). From the History of the Economic and Social Life of Russia: Collection of Articles for the 90th Anniversary of Academician N. M. Druzhinin. Moscow: Nauka.
- Borchashvili, E. A. (2001). From the Past of the Chechens and Ingush. Tbilisi: Telavi State University named after Ya. Gogebashvili.
- Akhmadov, Ya. Z. (2005). "Akkins". Encyclopedia of the Cultures of the Peoples of Southern Russia. Vol. I: Peoples of Southern Russia. Rostov-on-Don: SKNTs VSh. ISBN 5-87872-089-2.
- Magomadova, T. S. (2012). "Petitions of the Terek Okotsk people in 1614, 1616". Bulletin of the Kalmyk Institute for Humanitarian Studies of the Russian Academy of Sciences (3). Elista: Kalmyk Scientific Center of the Russian Academy of Sciences.
- Polievktov, Mikhail Aleksandrovich (1926). Embassy of the stolnik Tolochanov and the clerk Iyevlev to Imereti, 1650–1652. International Relations of Georgia with Foreign Countries, Vol. I (in Russian and Georgian). Tiflis: Tiflis University Press.
