= Imam Kulu Khan =

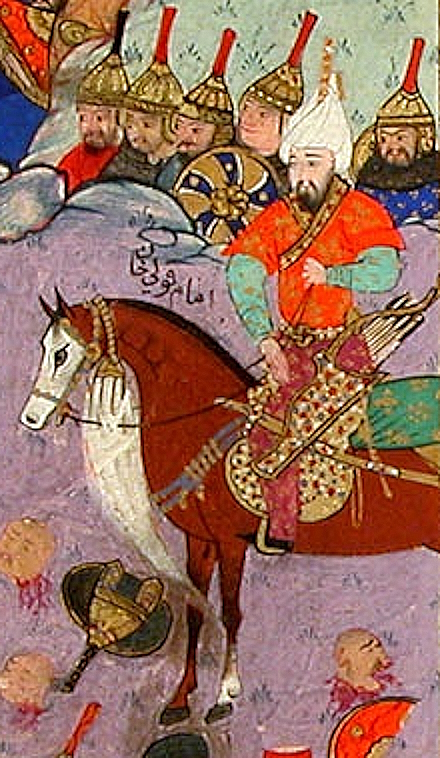
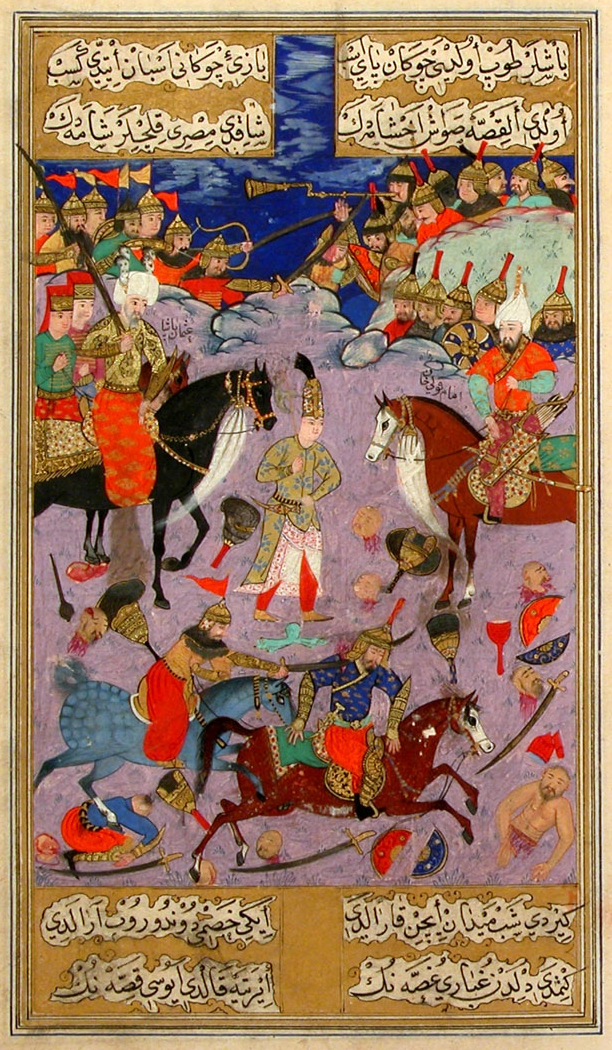
Imam Qoli Khan, facing Osman Pasha, circa 1584-85. Şecāʿatnāme (1586).

Imam Quli Khan (امام قولی خان), also Imam Qoli Khan or Imam Kulu Khan, was a governor of Safavid Gence (Ganja, Azerbaijan) and a Safavid general during the Ottoman–Safavid War (1578–1590).

Imam Kulu Khan was one of the Safavid commanders in the Battle of Çıldır in 1578, a Safavid defeat against the Ottomans.

Following the defeats of the Crimean forces of Gazi Giray and the Ottoman forces of Dal Mehmed Çelebi against the Safavids in the spring of 1581, Osman Pasha only left a garrison at Baku and withdrew his main troops to Derbent. The Safavids under Piri Muhammed Beg and İmam Kulu Khan harassed the retreating Ottoman troops as far as Derbent. In these actions, Gazi Giray was captured by the Safavids and then spent the next four years in imprisonment at the castle of Alamut.

İmam Kulu Khan again confronted the Ottoman general Osman Pasha in 1583. The Battle of Torches on the plain of Bilasa lasted three days and three nights. Imam Qoli Khan was defeated.

== Sources ==
- GÜNDOĞDU, Doç Dr Raşit (11 March 2020). The Sultans of the Ottoman Empire. Rumuz Yayınları. p. 89. ISBN 978-605-5112-15-8.
- Eravci, H. Mustafa (18 April 2023). "The Role of the Crimean Tatars in the Ottoman-Safavi Wars". Selçuk Üniversitesi Türkiyat Araştırmaları Dergisi (57). doi:10.21563/sutad.1285102.
