= Battle of Torches =

Battle between the Ottoman Empire and Iran

- Part of the Ottoman–Safavid War (1578–1590)
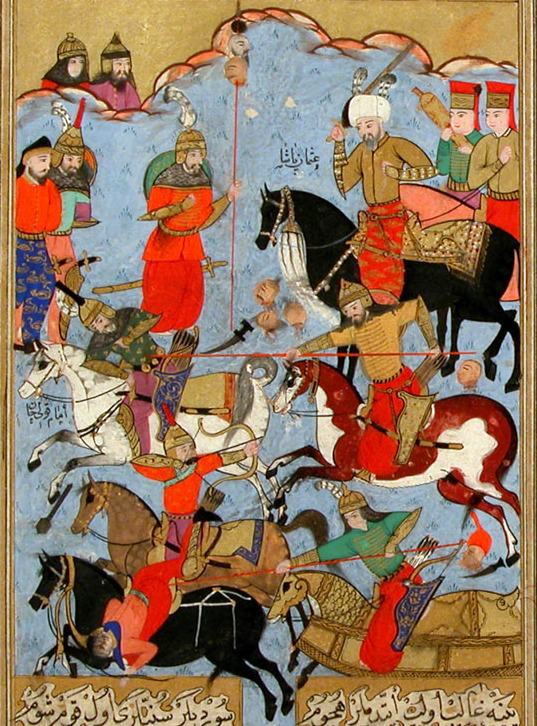
- Osman Pasha in the Battle of the Torches on a black horse (top right). Imam Kulu Khan being defeated (white horse, left). Şeca'atname (1586)
Date	9–11 May 1583
Location	Baştepe, near Derbent
Result	Ottoman victory

Belligerents
Ottoman Empire; Crimean Khanate; Lezgins; Tarki Shamkhalate; Nogais	Safavid Iran

Commanders and leaders
Osman Pasha; Cafer Pasha; Haydar Pasha	Hamza Mirza; Imam Kulu Khan; Rostam Khan; Borhan ol-Din

Strength
20,000	50,000+

Casualties and losses
Unknown	10,500+: 7,500 dead; 3,000+ prisoners

The Battle of Torches (Turkish: Meşaleler Savaşı) was fought in 1583 during the Ottoman–Safavid War (1578–1590). The name of the battle refers to the torches used during night clashes. The battle resulted in an Ottoman victory, thereby securing Dagestan and Shirvan until the end of the war.

== Background ==
In the first phase of the war the Ottomans had been able to conquer most of the Caucasus. Özdemiroğlu Osman Pasha (Özdemir Pasha’s son) was appointed as the governor of the newly conquered territories. The capital of his province was Derbend at the Caspian coast. However, after the Ottoman army returned to its main base in Istanbul, the Persians under Imam Kulu began to regain some of their former territories. Although an army from the Crimean Khanate (which was an Ottoman vassal) under Adil Giray was sent to the Caucasus in summer 1578 as a reinforcement, they were routed by Hamza Mirza and Mirza Salman at the Battle of Mollahasanli (November 1578), and Adil Giray was taken prisoner, and imprisoned in Qazvin, where he was later executed. Consequently, Osman Pasha had to retreat to North Caucasus. In 1582, the Ottoman Porte sent a second reinforcing force under Jafer Pasha, the governor of Caffa, to restore Ottoman dominance in the area.

== Battle ==
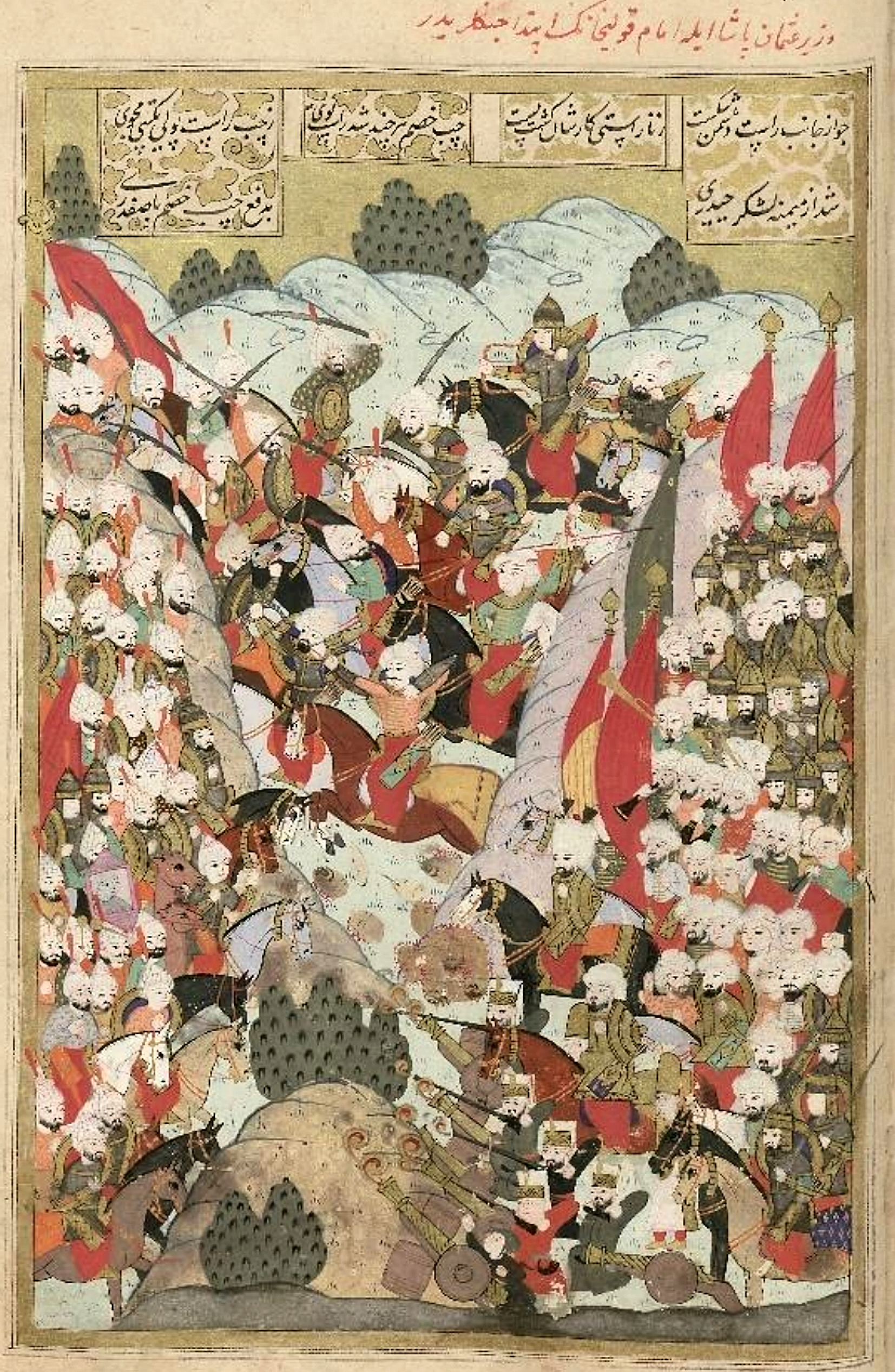
Battle of Torches. Şahanşahname (1592)

The 50,000-strong Persian army under Imam Kulu, together with Georgian irregulars, attacked again in the spring of 1583. In a first clash by the vanguard units of both armies, the Ottomans were defeated (25 April 1583). The main clash occurred in Baştepe near Derbend on 9 May 1583. On the Ottoman side, Osman Pasha was placed in the center, Cafer Pasha was at the left flank and Haydar Pasha, the governor of Sivas, was at the right flank. On the Persian side, Imam Kulu was in the center, Rustem Khan was at the right, and Burhaneddin at the left. The result of the battle was inconclusive at the end of the first day, but the battle continued during the night, with both sides using torches. On the second day, there was a momentary pause in the combat. But on the third day, an Ottoman general attack marked the end of the battle. The Persian army was defeated and the Persian prisoners of war exceeded 3,000.

== Aftermath ==
By this victory, the Ottomans were able to establish control over all of the Caucasus. After further Ottoman victories in the south (conquest of Tabriz) both sides agreed to conclude peace. By the Treaty of Ferhat Pasha of 1590, Persians acknowledged Ottoman gains in both the Caucasus and modern Azerbaijan as well as West Iran. But these gains were not long lasting, as they were reversed in the next Ottoman–Safavid War.
