= Kemal Karpat =

Turkish historian

- Born: Kemal Karpat; 15 February 1924; Babadag, Tulcea, Romania
- Died: February 20, 2019 (aged 95); Manchester, New Hampshire
- Education: Istanbul University (LLB); University of Washington (MA); New York University (PhD)
- Occupations: Professor; historian
- Scientific career
- Workplaces: New York University; Montana State University Bozeman; Princeton University; Bilkent University; Middle East Technical University; Ankara University; Harvard University; Johns Hopkins University; Columbia University; School for Advanced Studies in the Social Sciences; University of Washington; Istanbul Şehir University

Kemal Karpat (15 February 1924, Babadag Tulcea, Romania – 20 February 2019, Manchester, New Hampshire, United States) was a Romanian-Turkish naturalised American historian and professor at the University of Wisconsin–Madison.

== Early life ==
He was of Turkish origin and born in Babadag, Romania. He received his LLB from the Istanbul University, his MA from the University of Washington and his PhD from New York University. He previously worked for the UN Economic and Social Council and taught at the University of Montana and New York University. His final post was at Istanbul Şehir University.

== Views ==
Kemal Karpat is a proponent of the "nationalist thesis"; he is one of the Armenian genocide deniers who is used by the Turkish Foreign Ministry to argue that the Armenian genocide did not happen.

Karpat unconditionally and uncritically accepts Ottoman population statistics, whilst renouncing Armenian statistics as unreliable; this approach has been criticized by scholars, such as Fuat Dündar. Academic Cengiz Günay summarizes Karpat's approach to the Armenian genocide:

He is even more assertive when it comes to the question of the Armenian Genocide, which he addresses in the third main chapter. As previously mentioned, Karpat puts forward the more than controversial thesis that one million Armenians had migrated to Armenia. Even though he claims that his arguments rest on relevant documents, he does not disclose or quote any such sources. Karpat criticises that many Turkish scholars have uncritically adopted the Armenian narrative of a genocide without any further research.

Karpat has also been called by Erkan Erçel as "one of the significant constituents of the idyllic hegemonic Ottoman image". He also supported the Turkish invasion of Cyprus, providing "uncritical support of the Turkish position".

== Selected publications ==
- Elites and Religion: From Ottoman Empire to Turkish Republic (Times, 2010)
- The Gecekondu: Rural Migration and Urbanization (Cambridge University Press; 2009)
- The Politicization of Islam (Oxford University Press, 2001)
- The Ottoman Past and Today's Turkey (Brill, 2000)
- Political and Social Thought in the Contemporary Middle East (Praeger, 1968)
- Turkey's Politics: The Transition to a Multi-Party System (Princeton University Press, 1959)
- Political Modernization in Japan and Turkey (Princeton University Press, 1964)
- An Inquiry into the Social Foundations of Nationalism in the Ottoman State (Princeton UP, 1973)
- Social Change and Politics in Turkey (Brill Leiden, 1973)
- Turkey's Foreign Policy in Transition (Brill Leiden, 1975)
