= Davud Agha =

Ottoman architect

- Born: unknown
- Died: 1598 or 1599; Istanbul
- Occupation: Architect

Davud Agha was the chief imperial architect of the Ottoman Empire from 1588, after the death of his predecessor Sinan, until his death in 1598 or 1599. His works include various monuments from the classical period of Ottoman architecture.

== Career ==
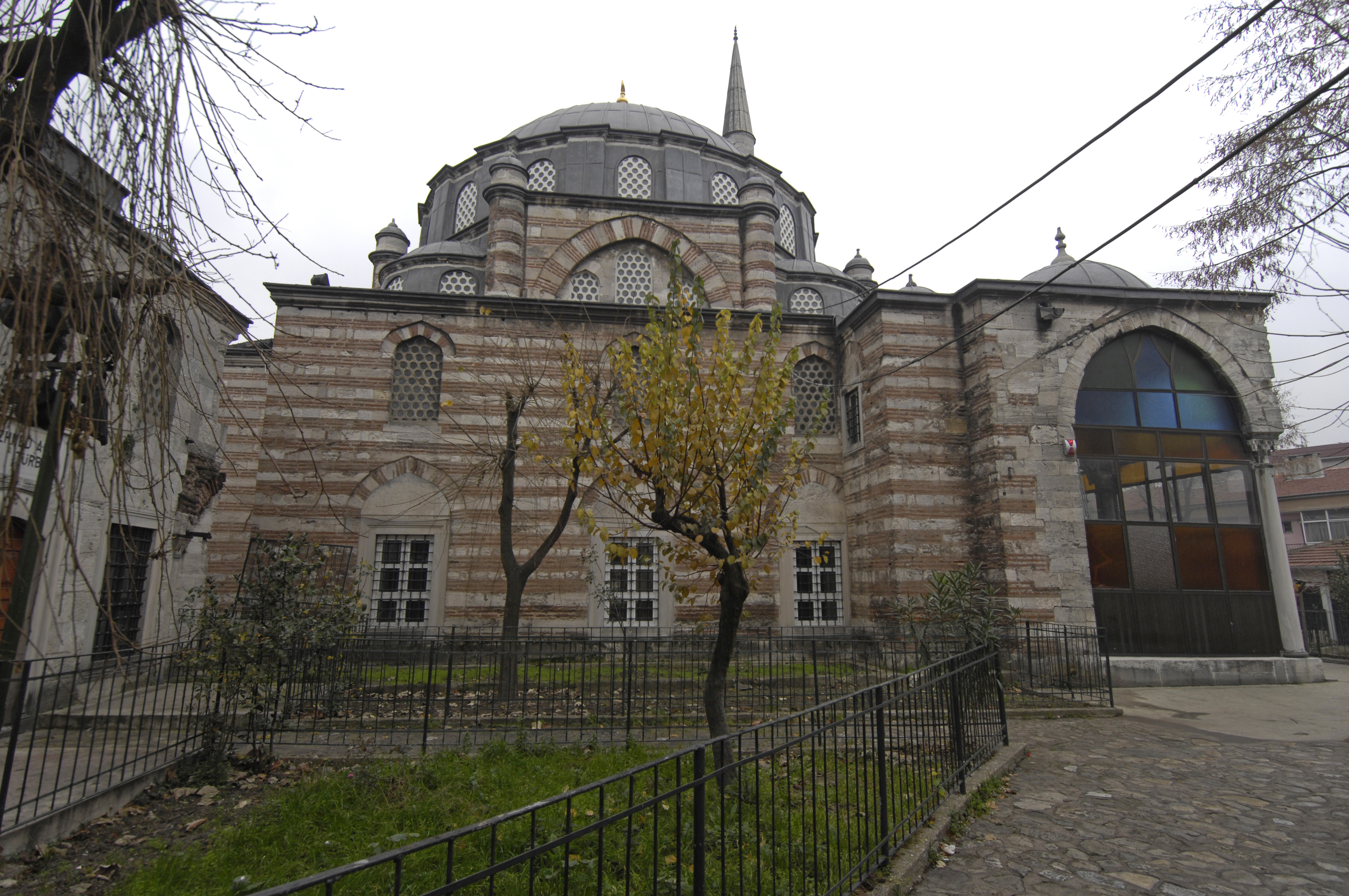
The Mehmed Agha Mosque in Istanbul (1585), one of Davud's early works before he became chief imperial architect

There is no information about Davud Agha's birth or origin. He was recruited as a janissary via the devshirme system and from there followed a typical path into the Ottoman bureaucracy, studying architecture under the master architect Sinan. He rose to become a senior official in the imperial department of architects and in 1576 he was appointed the Master of the Waterways (in charge of water supply infrastructure), the second-highest position in the department. He probably participated as a military engineer in the Ottoman campaign against the Safavids in 1583. He was a protegé of the Chief Black Eunuch, Mehmed Agha or Mehmet bin Abdurrahman. Under the latter's supervision, he may have been responsible for a late expansion of the Atik Valide Mosque in Üsküdar (previously designed by Sinan) between 1584 and 1586. The earliest work clearly attributed to him was in the Topkapı Palace in 1585, where he constructed the sultan's bath and most likely the adjacent Imperial Hall (Hünkâr Sofası). Other early works attributed to him, while Sinan was still the chief architect, are the mosque of Kızlarağa Mehmet at Çarşamba (circa 1585) and the Mehmed Agha Mosque and Mehmed Agha Hamam (1585) in Istanbul. Upon Sinan's death in 1588, he was appointed chief architect in his place.

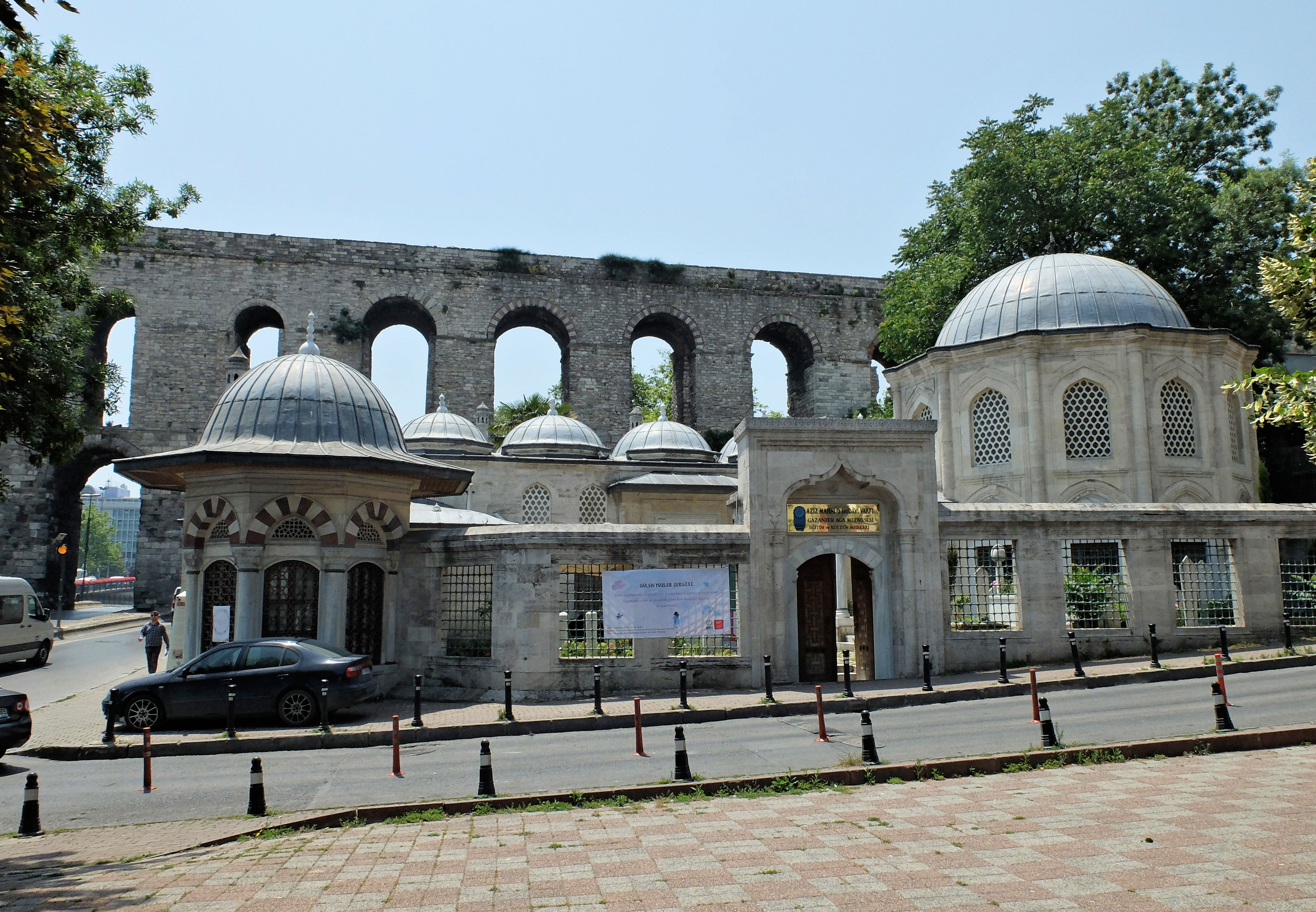
The Gazanfer Agha complex (built before 1599), one of Davud's later works

One of the buildings sometimes attributed to him is the Nışançı Mehmed Pasha Mosque (1584–1589) in Istanbul, but it may be a late work of Sinan or even possibly a work of Sedefkar Mehmed Agha. He probably designed the market (arasta) and primary school that were added to the Selimiye Mosque complex built by Sinan in Edirne. The Cerrahpasha Mosque (for Cerrah Mehmed Pasha) in Istanbul, completed around 1593, is likely attributable to him. Other monuments more securely attributed to him include the Tomb of Koca Sinan Pasha (1593) on Divanyolu, the Basketmakers' Kiosk (1591) and Pearl Kiosk (1593) on the Bosphorus shore, and the complex of Gazanfer Agha (before 1596 or 1599) near the Valens Aqueduct.

He was likely commissioned to build the mausoleum of Sultan Murad III, located in the precinct of Hagia Sophia, when that sultan died in 1595. He most likely designed the tomb but it was completed after his death by Dalgıç Ahmed Agha in 1599 or 1600. Davud Agha was also responsible for beginning construction on the Yeni Valide Mosque in the Eminönü neighbourhood of Istanbul in 1597, on the orders of Safiye Sultan. The project was ultimately abandoned after his death and only completed later in 17th century by a different architect and patron.

== Style ==
Davud was Sinan's apprentice and followed the latter's teachings closely. His mosque designs tend to follow the octagonal baldaquin and hexagonal baldquin ideas that Sinan used in his late career. Some scholars have characterized his works as conservative, citing the design of the Yeni Valide Mosque as an example because it follows the design of the Şehzade Mosque, a work from Sinan's early career. Art historian Doğan Kuban, based on the assumption that the Nışançı Mehmed Pasha Mosque is his work, states that Davud was one of the few Ottoman architects after Sinan who displayed great potential and who went beyond his designs.

== Death and successors ==
Two different accounts of Davud's death are found in historical sources, one claiming that he died of the plague in September 1598 (1007 AH) and another claiming that he was executed at Vefa Square in 1599 (1008 AH). He was succeeded as chief architect by Dalgıç Ahmed Agha, who remained in the post until 1605 or 1606 and was in turn succeeded by Sedefkar Mehmed Agha.
