= Albert Király =

Hungarian soldier from Transylvania

- Military career
- Allegiance: Transylvania
- Conflicts: Battle of Călugăreni (1595); Battle of Giurgiu (1595); Battle of Mezőkeresztes (1596)

Albert Király was a Hungarian noble and Transylvanian military captain who participated in a few battles in the 16th century. He was a mercenary captain at the Battle of Călugăreni. Király was captain of 6,000 Székely troops who went to battle alongside the Wallachian troops, but didn't participate directly in the clash, serving as the army's reserve. The Wallachian army led by Michael the Brave achieved a victory at the Battle of Călugăreni.

In the winter of 1594–1595, he was commander-in-chief of the Transylvanian army sent to Wallachia in collaboration with Michael the Brave, and defeated Hadım Hafız Ahmed Pasha at Silistra, and at Brăila the army of Grand Vizier Koca Sinan Pasha. As a deputy commander he took part in the battle against Sinan led by Stephen Bocskai at Giurgiu, then on 26 October 1596 in the Battle of Mezőkeresztes.
