= Gördes Dam =

- Location within Turkey
- Official name: Gördes Baraji
- Country: Turkey
- Location: Gölmarmara, Manisa Province
- Coordinates: 38°45′42″N 28°03′23″E
- Status: Operational
- Construction began: 1998
- Opening date: 2009
- Owner: Turkish State Hydraulic Works

Dam and spillways
- Type of dam: Embankment, concrete-face rock-fill
- Impounds: Gördes River
- Height (foundation): 95 m (312 ft)
- Height (thalweg): 82.9 m (272 ft)
- Length: 547 m (1,795 ft)
- Width (crest): 8 m (26 ft)
- Dam volume: 5,500,000 m^{3} (7,193,728 cu yd)
- Spillway type: Chute

Reservoir
- Total capacity: 448,500,000 m^{3} (363,605 acre⋅ft)
- Surface area: 14 km^{2} (5 mi^{2})

The Gördes Dam is a concrete-face rock-fill dam on the Gördes River located 13 km (8 mi) northeast of Gölmarmara in Manisa Province, Turkey. It was constructed between 1998 and 2009 by the Turkish State Hydraulic Works in Turkey. The primary purpose of the dam is water supply. It provides drinking water for the city of Manisa, Turkey while also irrigating 19,260 ha (47,592 acres).

== See also ==
- List of dams and reservoirs in Turkey
