= Nışançı Mehmed Pasha Mosque =

Mosque in Fatih, Istanbul, Turkey

- Nışançı Mehmed Paşa Camii
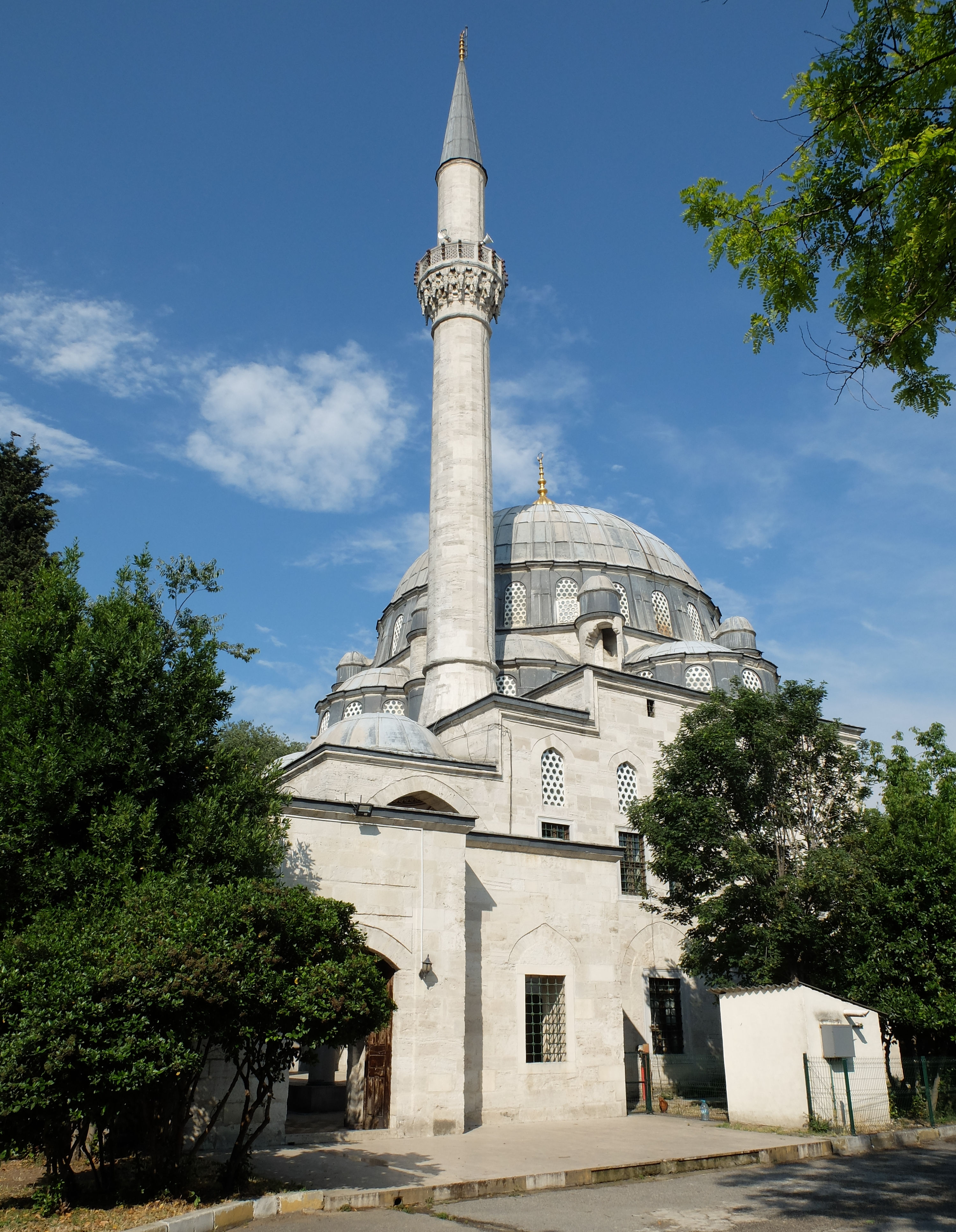

- Location within Istanbul

Religion
- Affiliation: Islam

Location
- Location: Fatih, Istanbul, Turkey
- Interactive map of Nışançı Mehmed Pasha Mosque
- Coordinates: 41°01′27″N 28°56′41″E

Architecture
- Type: Mosque
- Style: Classical Ottoman
- Groundbreaking: 1584
- Completed: 1589

Specifications
- Dome dia. (inner): 14.2 metres (47 ft)
- Minaret: 1

The Nışançı Mehmed Pasha Mosque (Turkish: Nışançı Mehmed Paşa Camii) is a late 16th-century Ottoman mosque in Istanbul, Turkey. The mosque is part of an architectural complex (külliye) that also includes the tomb of its founder, Nışançı Mehmed Pasha, and formerly included two madrasas and a Sufi lodge (tekke).

== Historical background ==
The mosque was sponsored by Nışançı Mehmed Pasha, an Ottoman official who joined the imperial chancery, rose to post of chief secretary (reisülküttab) and then chancellor (nışançı) in 1567. He served as governor of Aleppo from around 1574 to 1576, then rose to the rank of vizier in 1580, under Sultan Murad III. He spent the rest of his career after this moving back and forth between this position and the position of chancellor.

According to an inscription at its entrance, the mosque itself was built from 1584 to 1589. The two madrasas of the complex were completed in 1592–3 (1001 AH). The tomb of Nışançı Mehmed Pasha was built before his death in 1594. The tekke for Sufis was likely added in the first half of the 17th century.

The building dates to the last years of Sinan's tenure as chief imperial architect. It is not mentioned in the Tezkiretü'l-ebniye, one of the major historical documents listing his works, though it is mentioned in the Tuhfetü'l-mi'marin. Art historian Godfrey Goodwin suggests that because of Sinan's old age at the time, the building was probably built by one of his assistants, which could have been either Davud Agha or Mehmed Agha. Doğan Kuban argues that the building should be attributed to Davud Agha, while some scholars accept that Sinan was still responsible for its design.

== Architecture ==
=== Interior (prayer hall) ===
The mosque is a product of the classical Ottoman style of the 16th century. The prayer hall, its most significant component, is covered by a single large dome that is supported structurally by an "octagonal baldaquin" design, meaning that its weight is held up by eight pillars in an octagonal configuration. This overall design is one that Sinan had used in previous works, but the Nışançı Mehmed Pasha Mosque differs in its execution from other instances of this type.

The prayer hall does not have the rectangular floor plan of most Ottoman mosques; instead, the pillars on the qibla side (southeastern side) are directly integrated into the outer walls, which forms a "stepped" profile in the floor plan on this side. The other sides of the prayer hall are lined with an elevated gallery, as is common in other Ottoman mosques of the time, but here it is reduced to a minor feature subordinate to the walls and pillars. The zones at the top of the supporting pillars are sculpted with muqarnas (stalactite-like sculpting). The two corners of the building between the polygonal prayer hall and the courtyard are occupied by rectangular rooms that likely served as tabhanes (guestrooms). The transition between the dome above and the octagon below is accomplished by four squinches or exedrae in the corners and four half-domes on the sides. The walls of the prayer hall are pierced with many windows which brings in large amounts of light, which contributes to the interior's overall sense of "height and lightness". The dome is 14.2 metres (47 ft) in diameter, making it the second-largest dome for a non-royal mosque (i.e. a mosque not sponsored by members of the Ottoman dynasty) after the Rüstem Pasha Mosque.

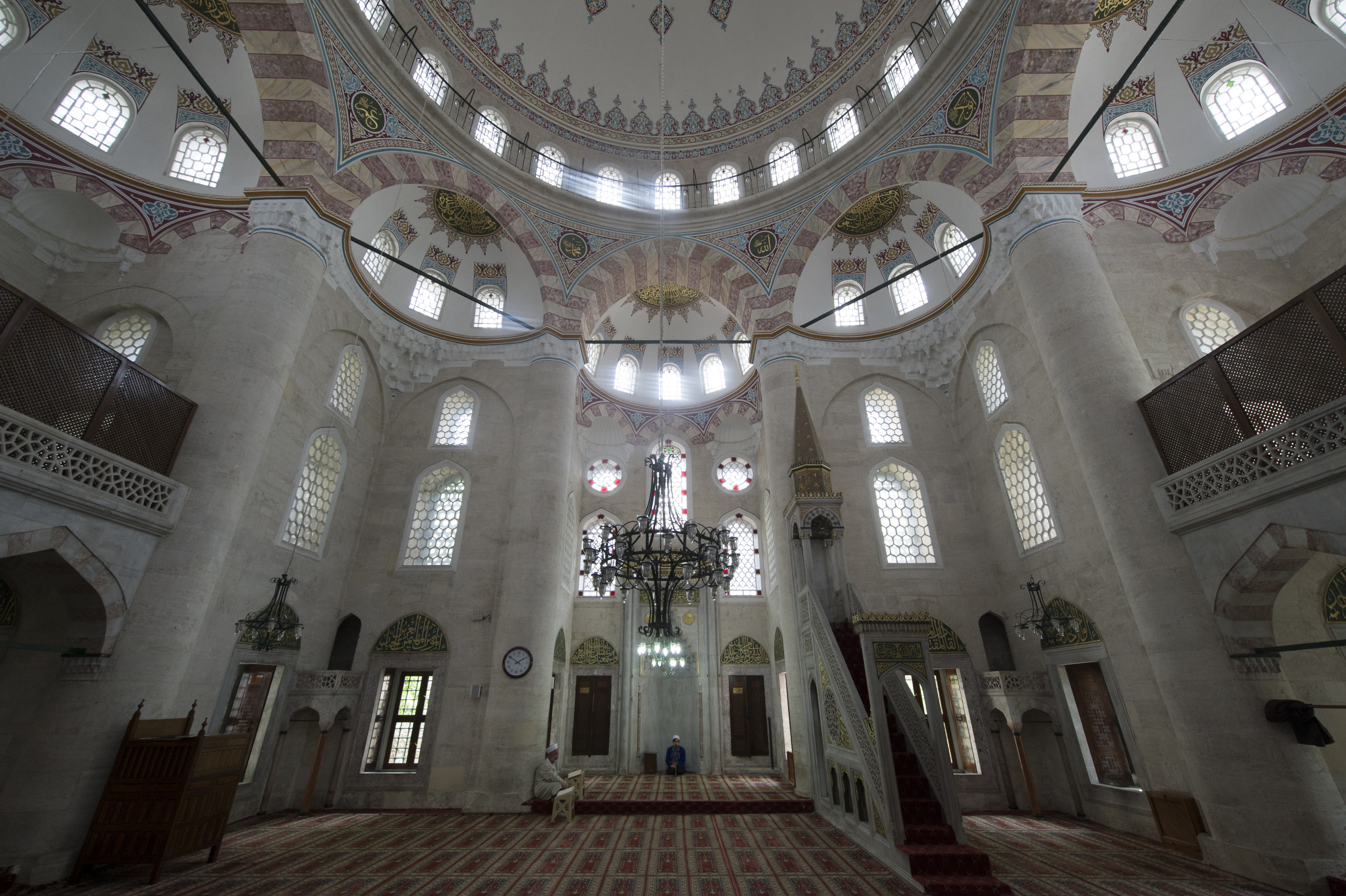
Prayer hall, looking southeast towards the qibla wall

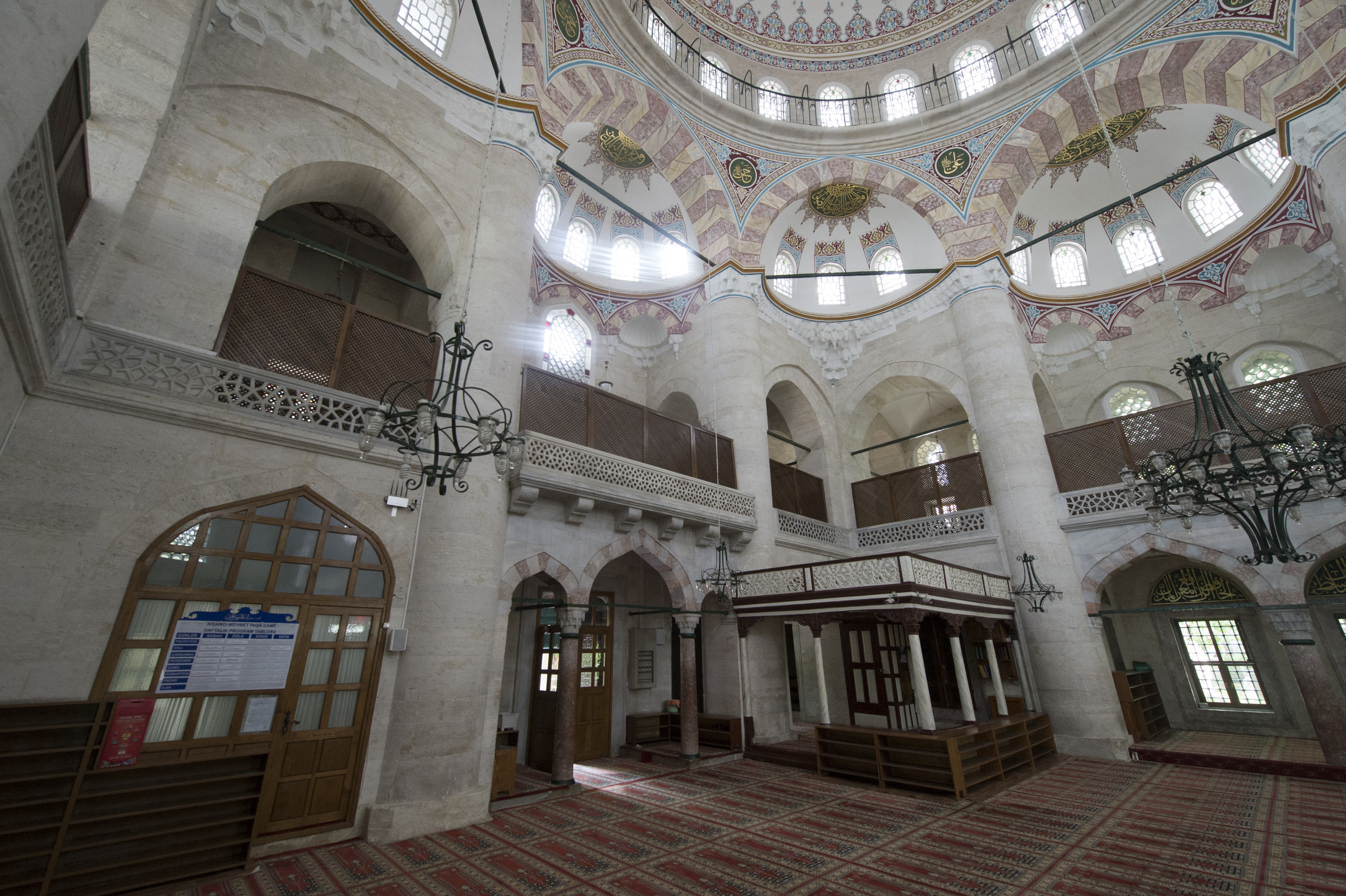
Prayer hall, looking north towards the entrance

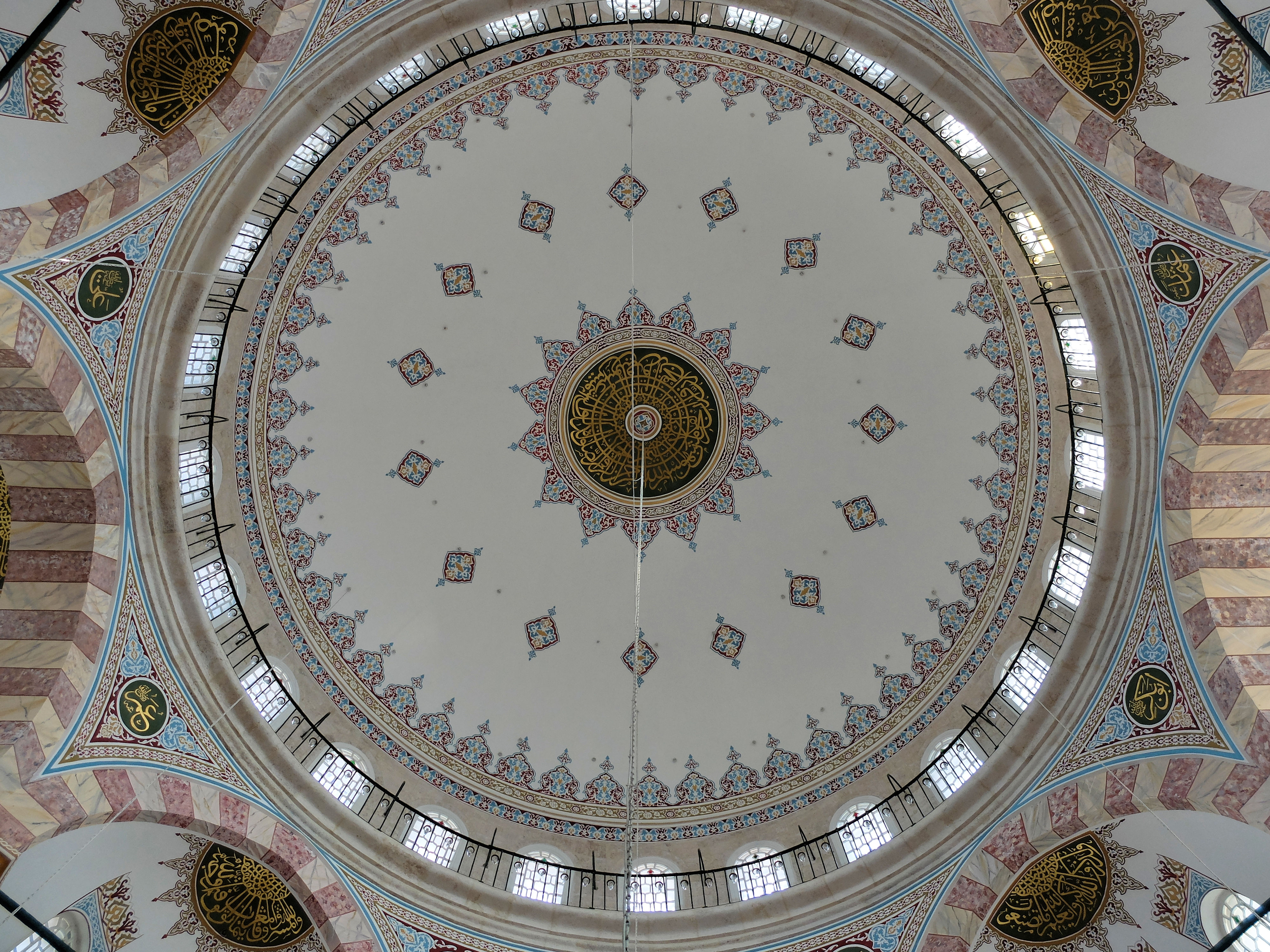
Dome of the prayer hall

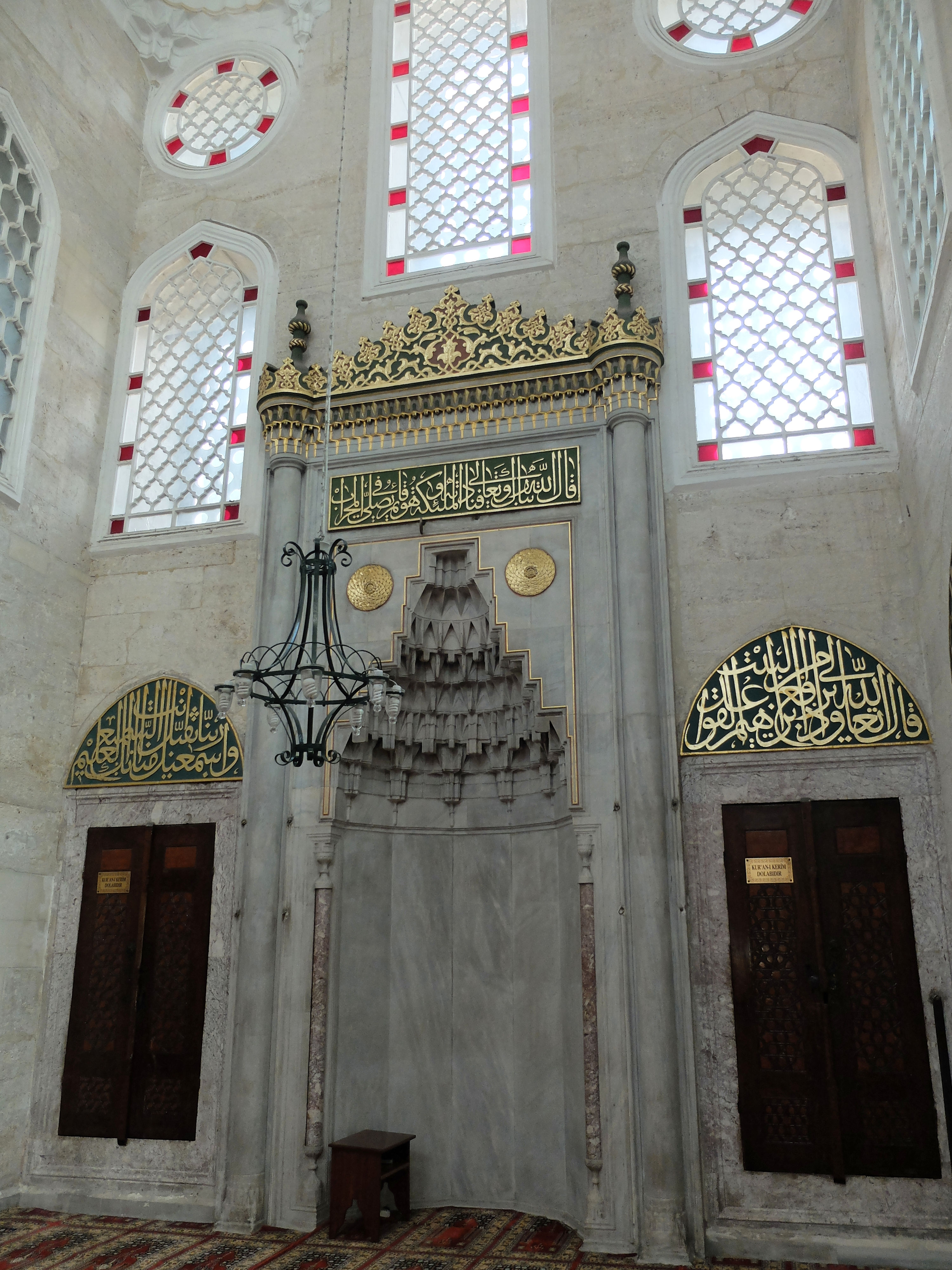
The main mihrab

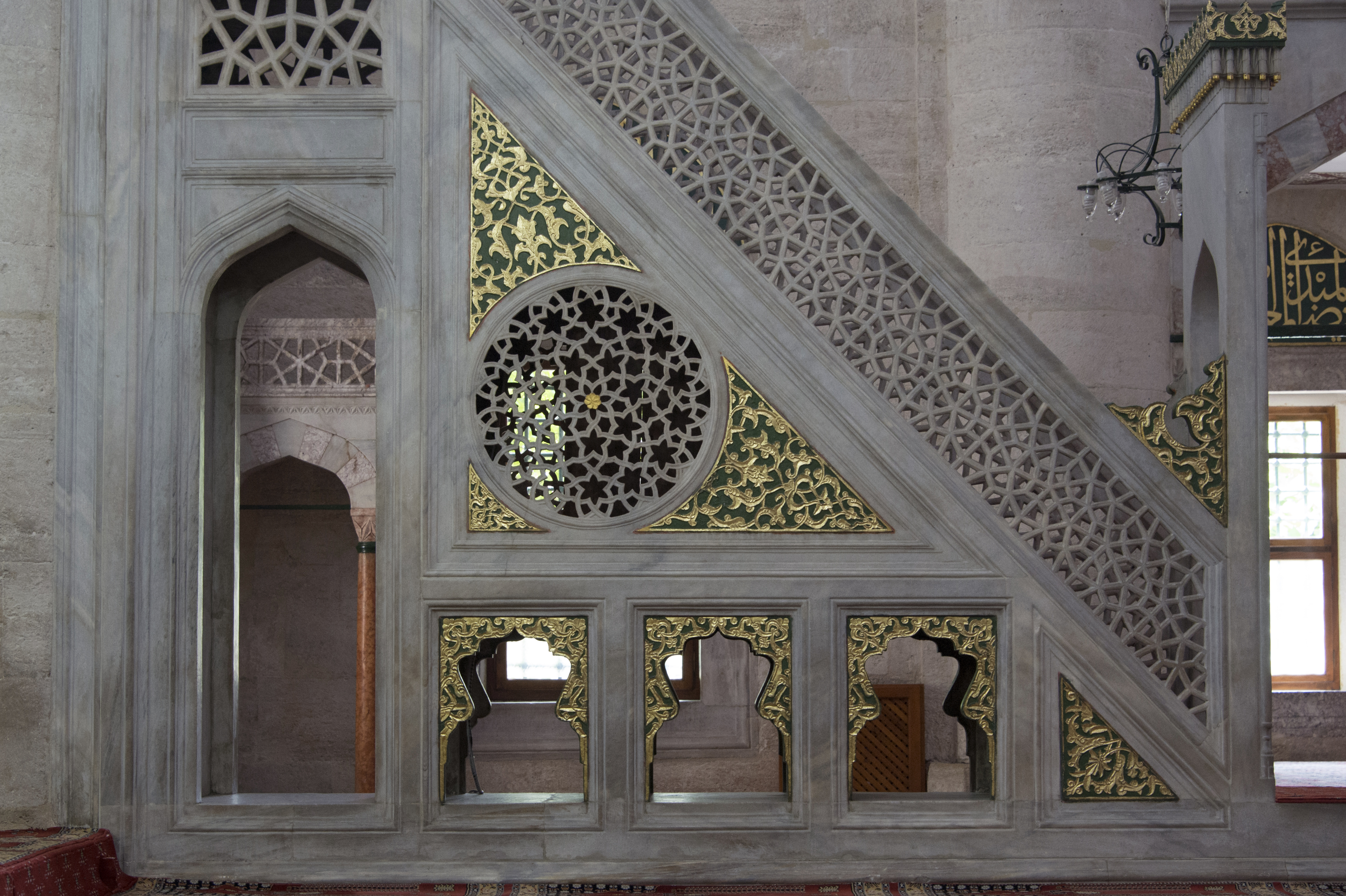
Detail of the minbar

=== Exterior ===
On the outside, the prayer hall is fronted to the northwest by a courtyard surrounded by an arcaded and domed gallery (revak). The courtyard is planted with trees, which makes it possibly the first or one of the first Ottoman mosques in Istanbul to feature a garden courtyard of this kind. The floor plan of the courtyard is partly truncated at the northeast corner by the presence of the street. At the center of the courtyard is a simple shadirvan (fountain). The arches of the courtyard galleries have roughly ogee profiles and are supported by columns of Bosphorus or Marmara marble. The columns have "chevron" capitals, their shapes formed by an assembly of triangles and lozenges. The domed portico in front of the prayer hall's entrance is taller than the galleries on the other three sides of the courtyard and its columns have muqarnas capitals. The entrance into the prayer hall is done via a tall portal with a muqarnas hood.

The single minaret of the mosque is positioned more directly as part of the main bulk of the building, rising behind the front portico. The use of tall turret buttresses to support the dome and the external exedrae and semi-domes that correspond to the ones inside give the building an elegant profile that makes that emphasizes its height. The exterior walls of the courtyard are built of alternating brick and stone layers.

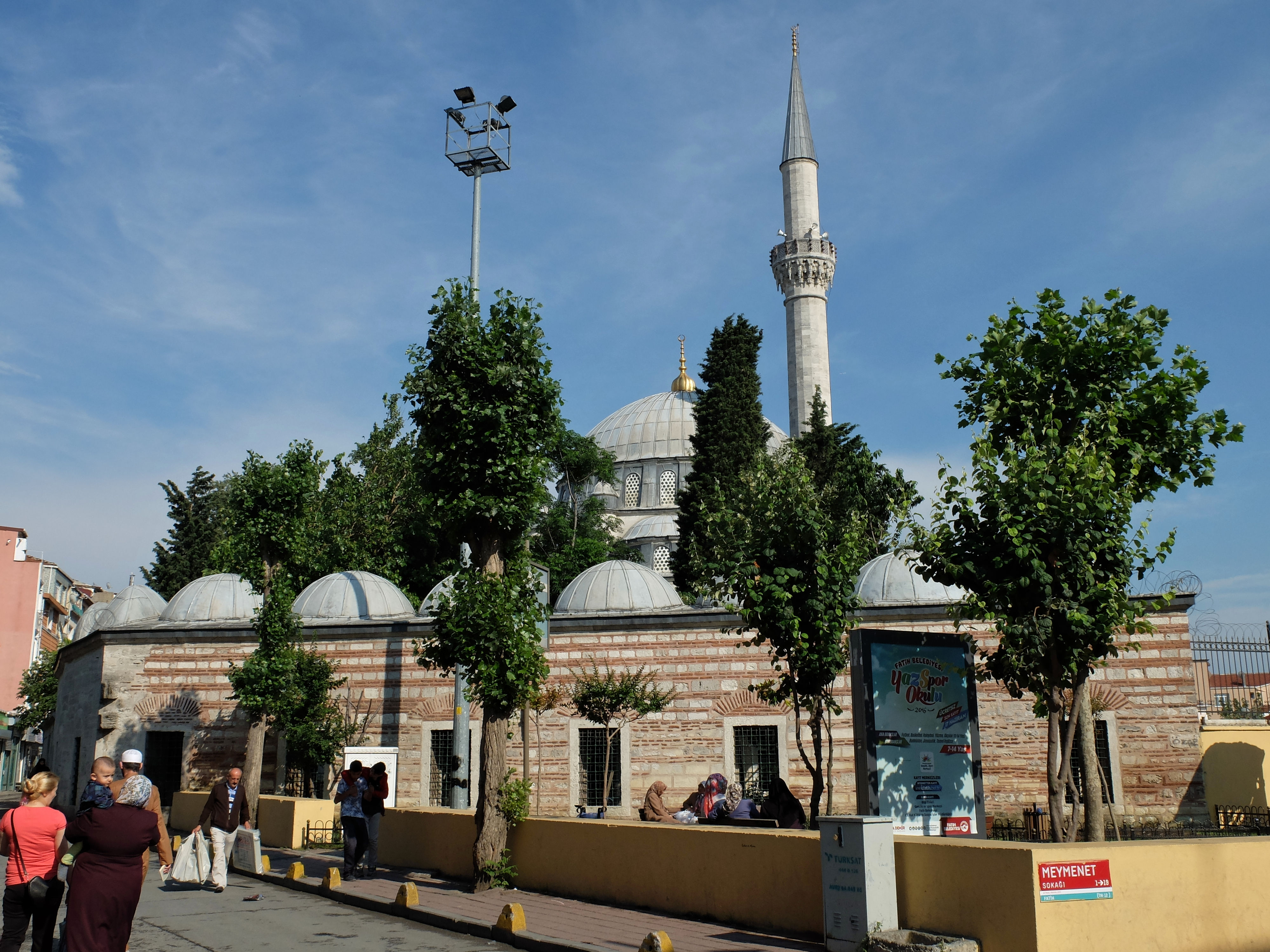
Northwest side of the mosque, outside the courtyard

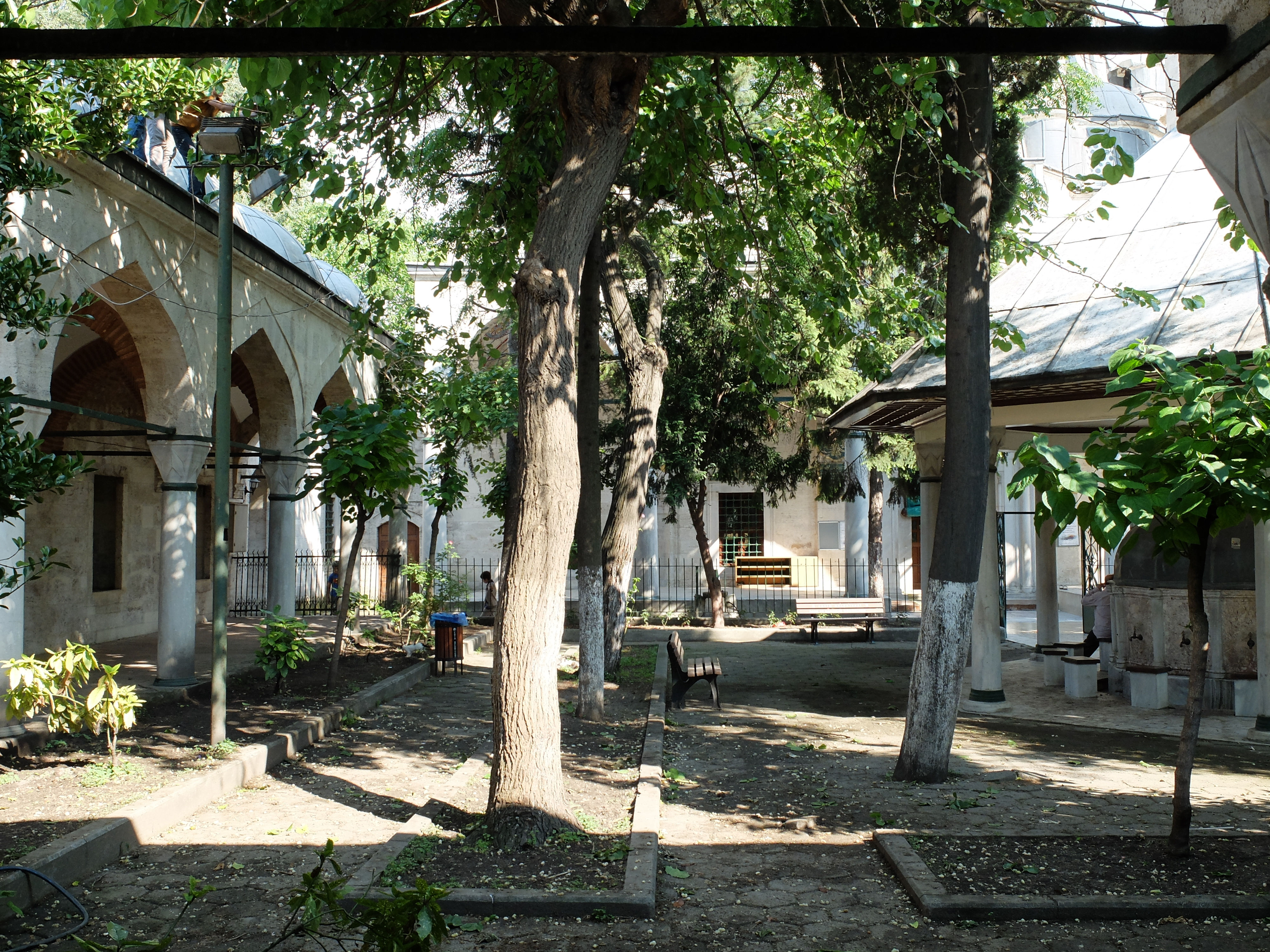
Interior of the courtyard

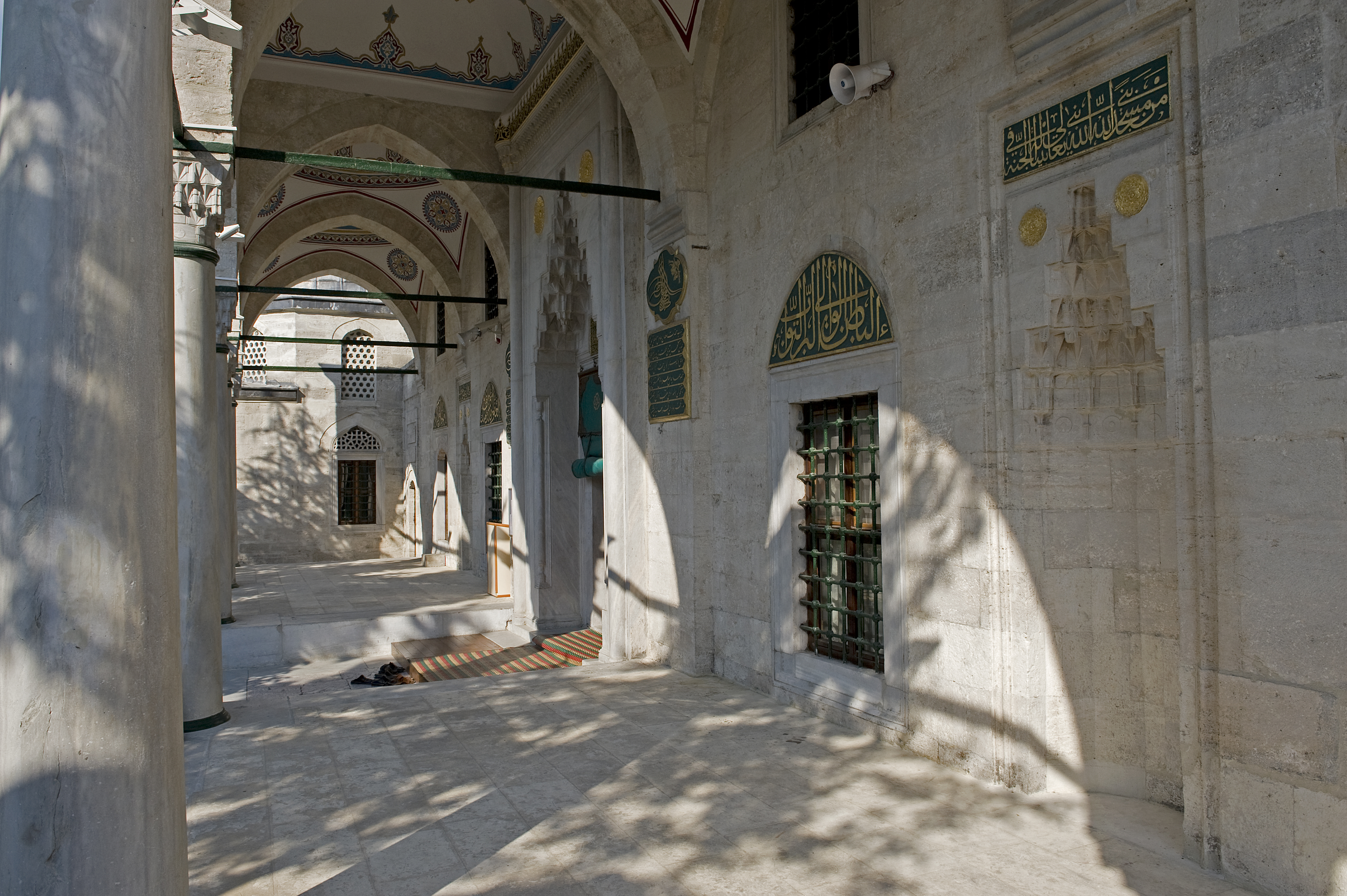
The main portico preceding the prayer hall

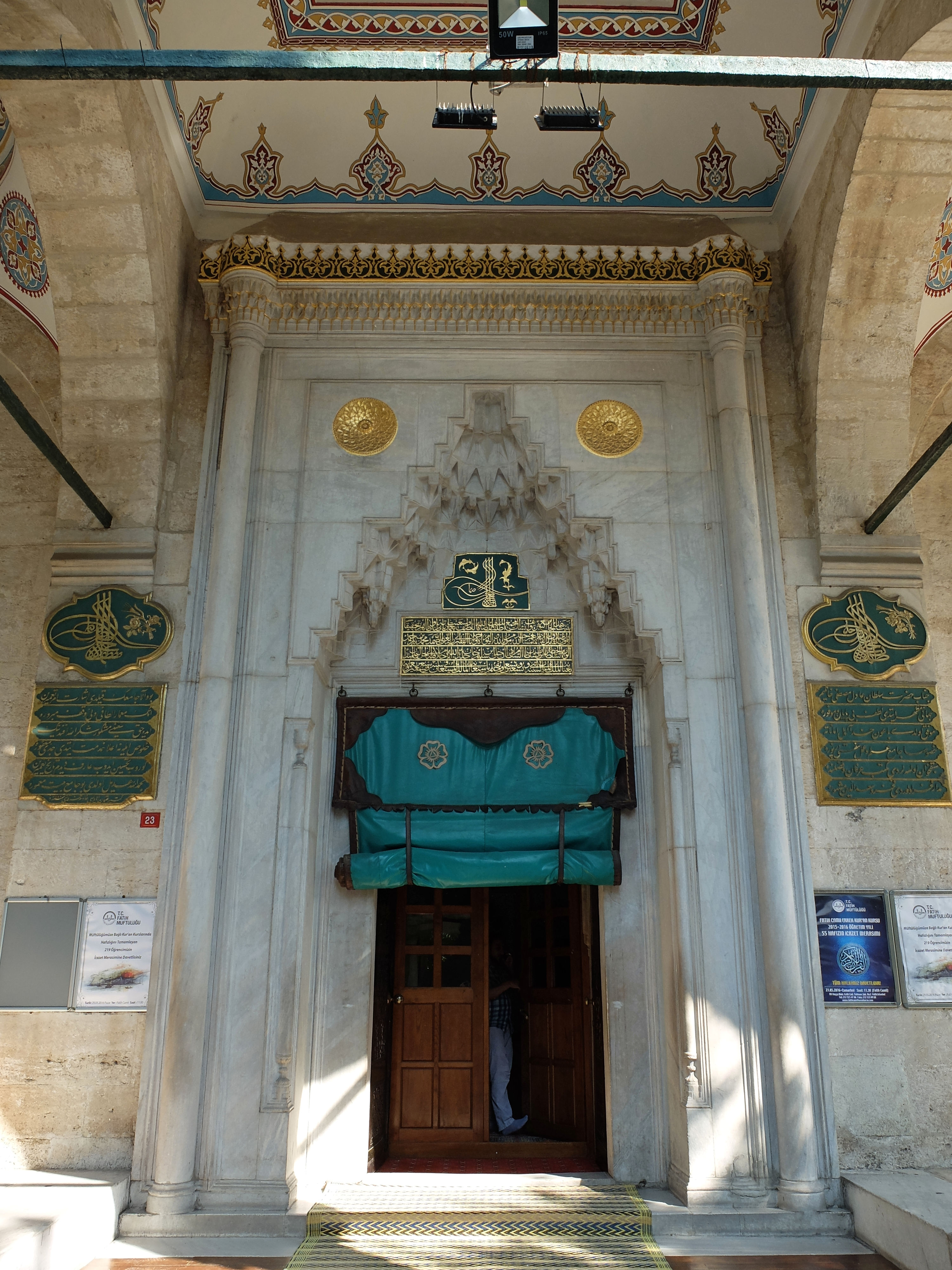
Entrance portal to the prayer hall, with muqarnas hood and calligraphic inscriptions

=== Inscriptions ===
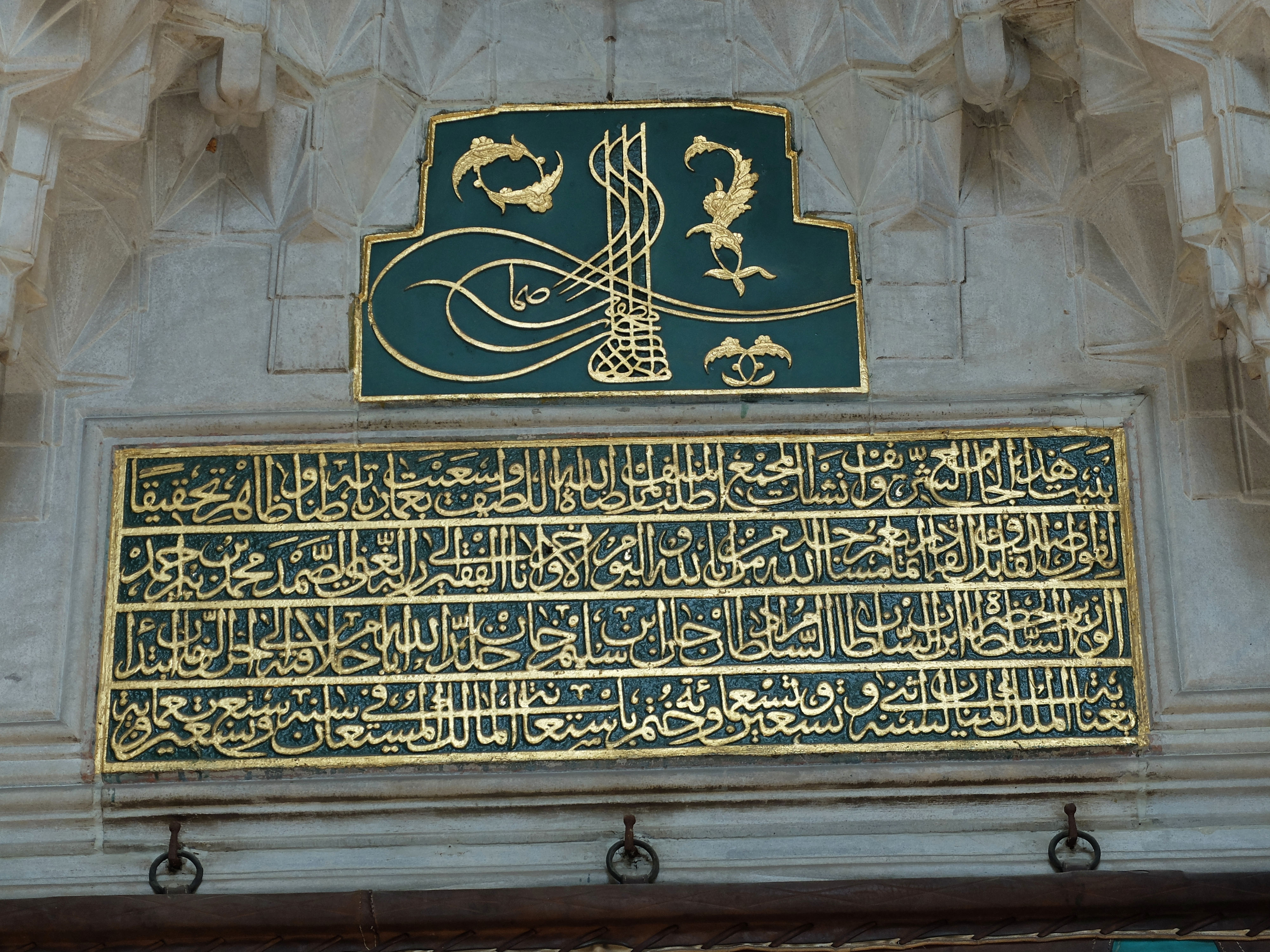
Tughra and foundation inscription over the entrance to the prayer hall

The prayer hall's entrance portal has an inscription panel and a very fine tughra (calligraphic signature) above it. The inscription panel, which consists of four lines of thuluth script, records the foundation of the mosque. The tughra represents the name of Murad III and may have been designed by Nişancı Mehmed Pasha himself. The windows and the two mihrab niches on the rest of the prayer hall's front façade are also topped by inscription panels that quote hadiths (above the mihrabs) and some of the 99 names of God (above the windows). The names of God are also quoted in lunettes above the windows inside the prayer hall, except for the windows on either side of the recessed area where the main mihrab is located; these ones quote a Qur'anic verse, al-Baqara (2:127). The inscription above the main mihrab quotes a variation of another verse (3:39). Additional inscriptions in the dome and semi-domes also quote parts of the Qur'an. One of the gates to the cemetery gardens is also topped by an inscription of a poem by Nişancı Mehmed Pasha.

=== Other elements of the complex ===
Most of the other original components of the mosque complex, including the two madrasas and the tekke (Sufi lodge) have been lost or destroyed. The madrasa was probably located in the now-empty space on the west side of the mosque.

The tomb of the patron, Nişancı Mehmet Pasha, still stands on the northeastern side of the mosque, next to the entrance to the courtyard. The tomb has an octagonal plan covered by a dome, with a small columned portico fronting its entrance. An inscription panel is present above the door. The interior is generally plain.

To the northwest and southeast of the tomb, between the mosque walls and the outer precinct wall, are occupied by small cemeteries. Another cemetery is also located to the north, across the street. At the southeastern corner of the cemetery, opposite the gate into the mosque's precinct, is a small ornate fountain. It was sponsored by Ebûbekir Ağa and is dated to 1793–4 (1208 AH).

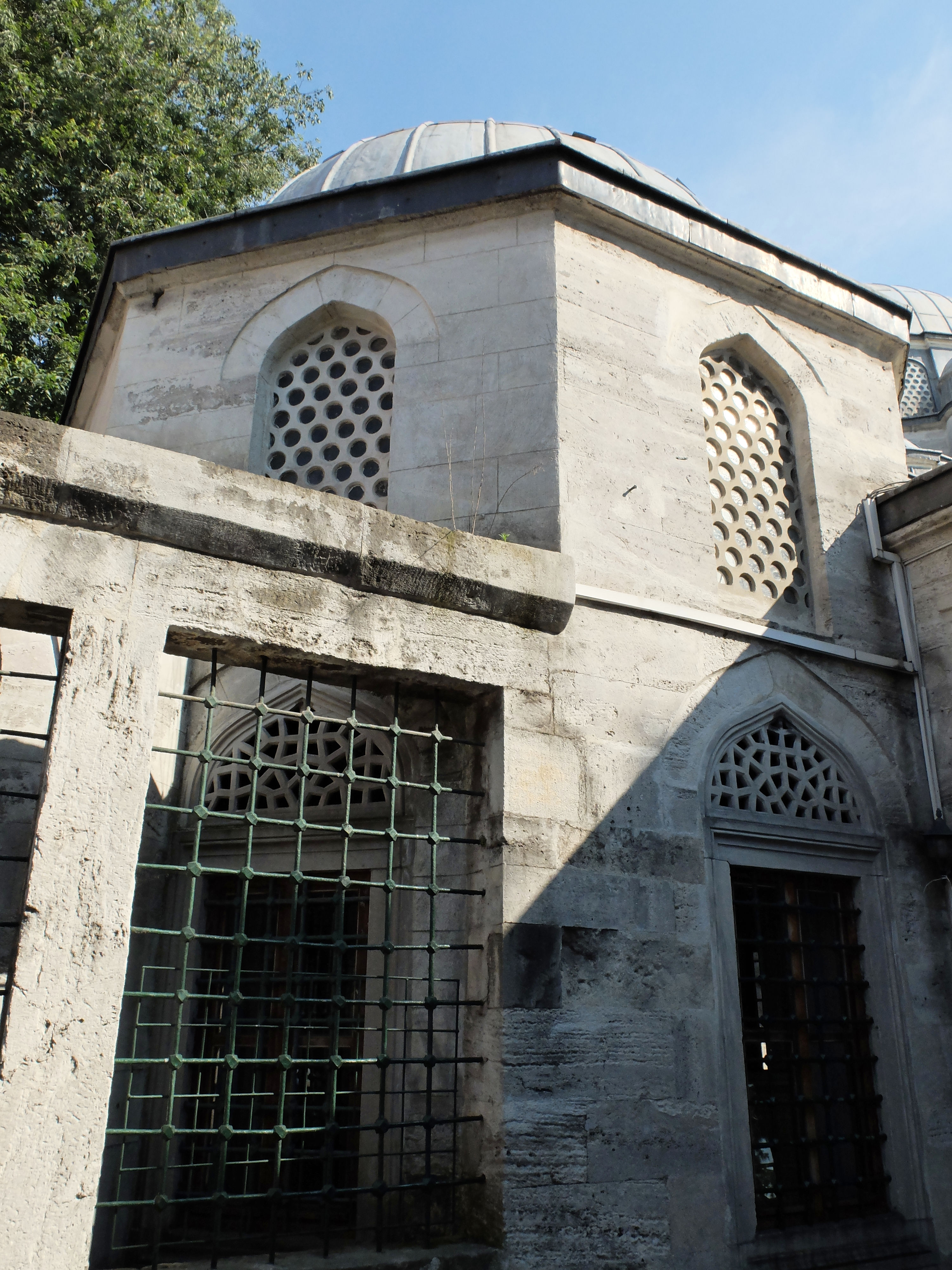
Mausoleum of Nişancı Mehmed Pasha

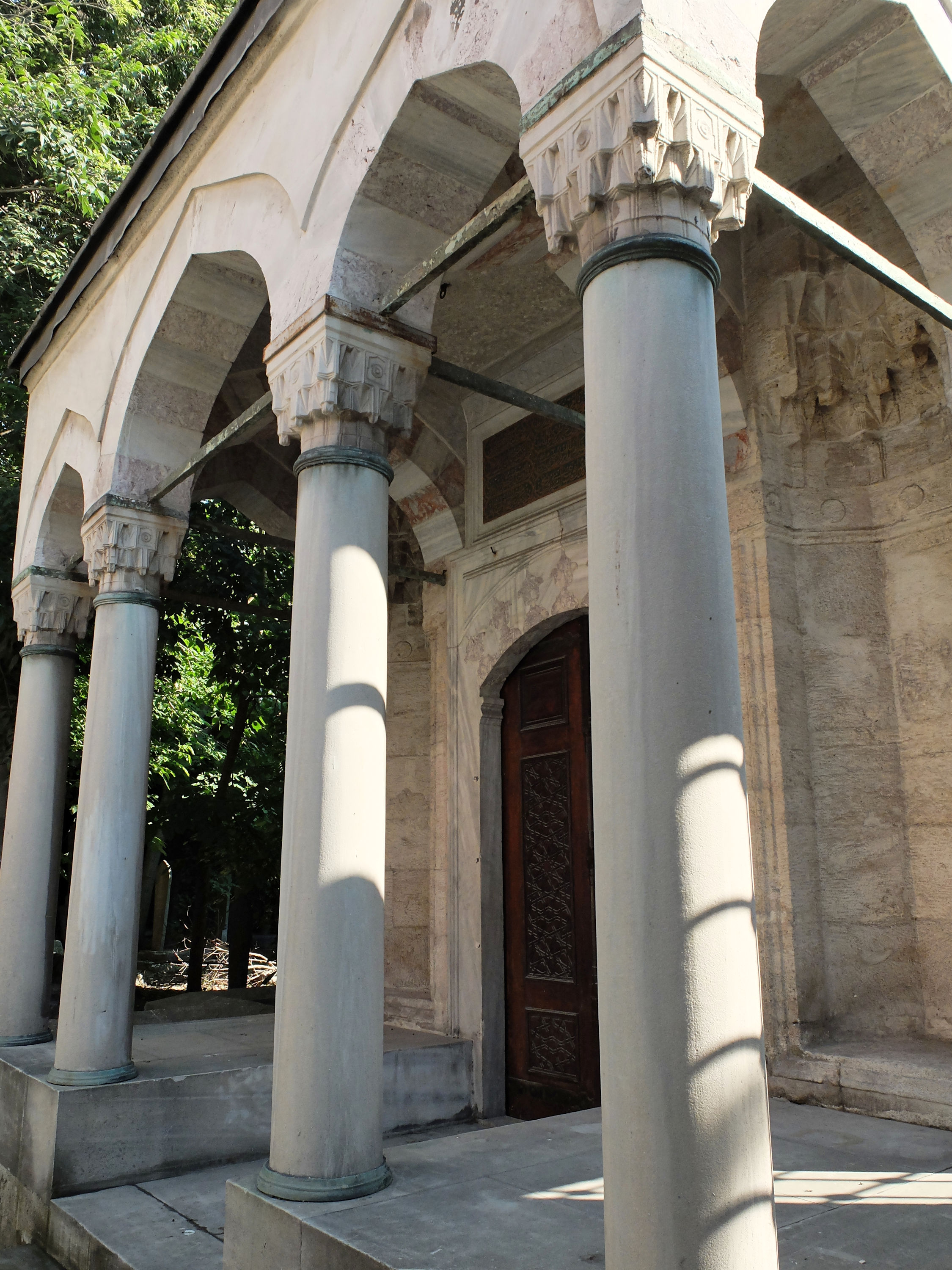
Entrance to the mausoleum of Nişancı Mehmed Pasha

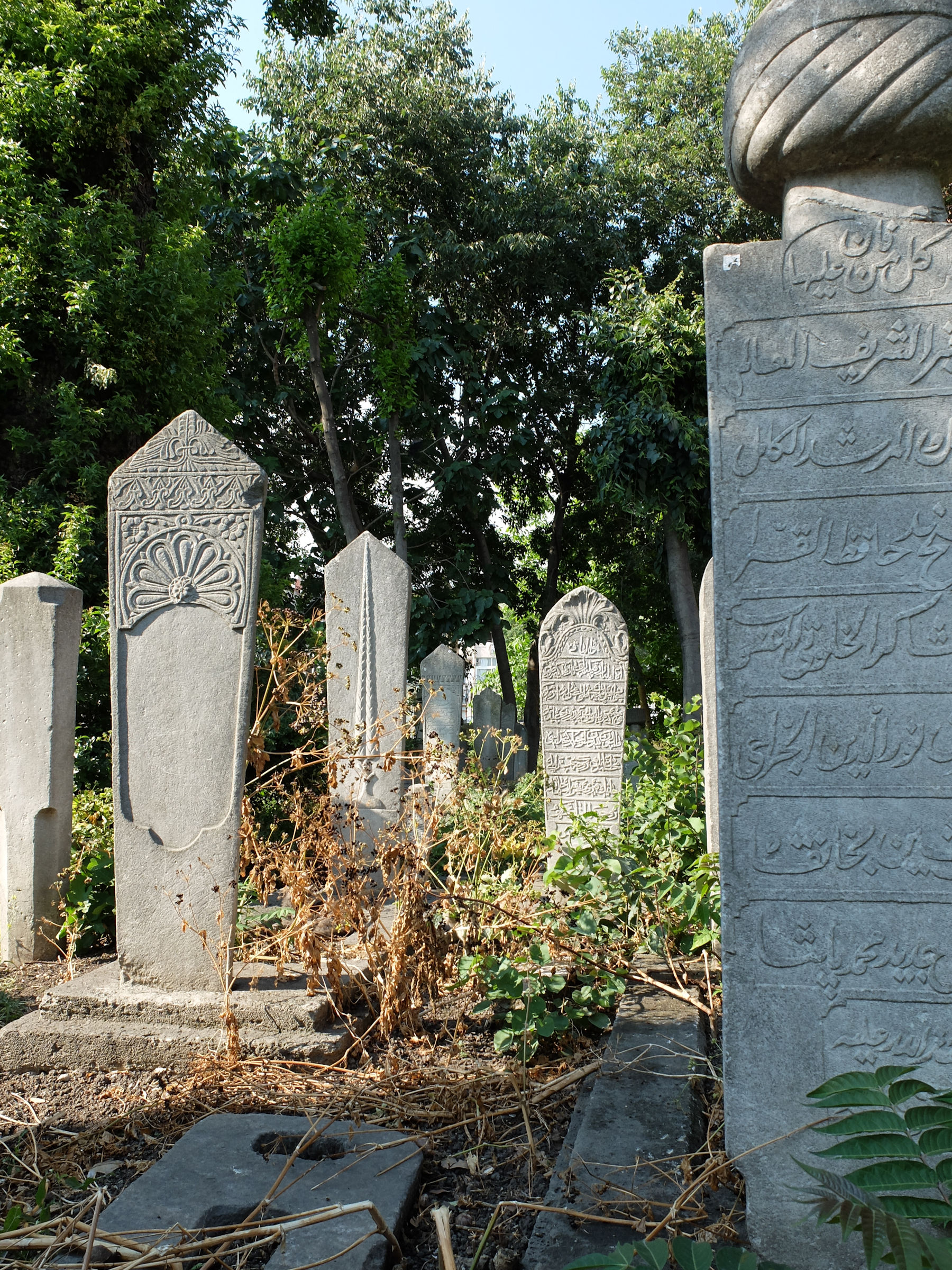
Cemetery across the street from the mosque on the north

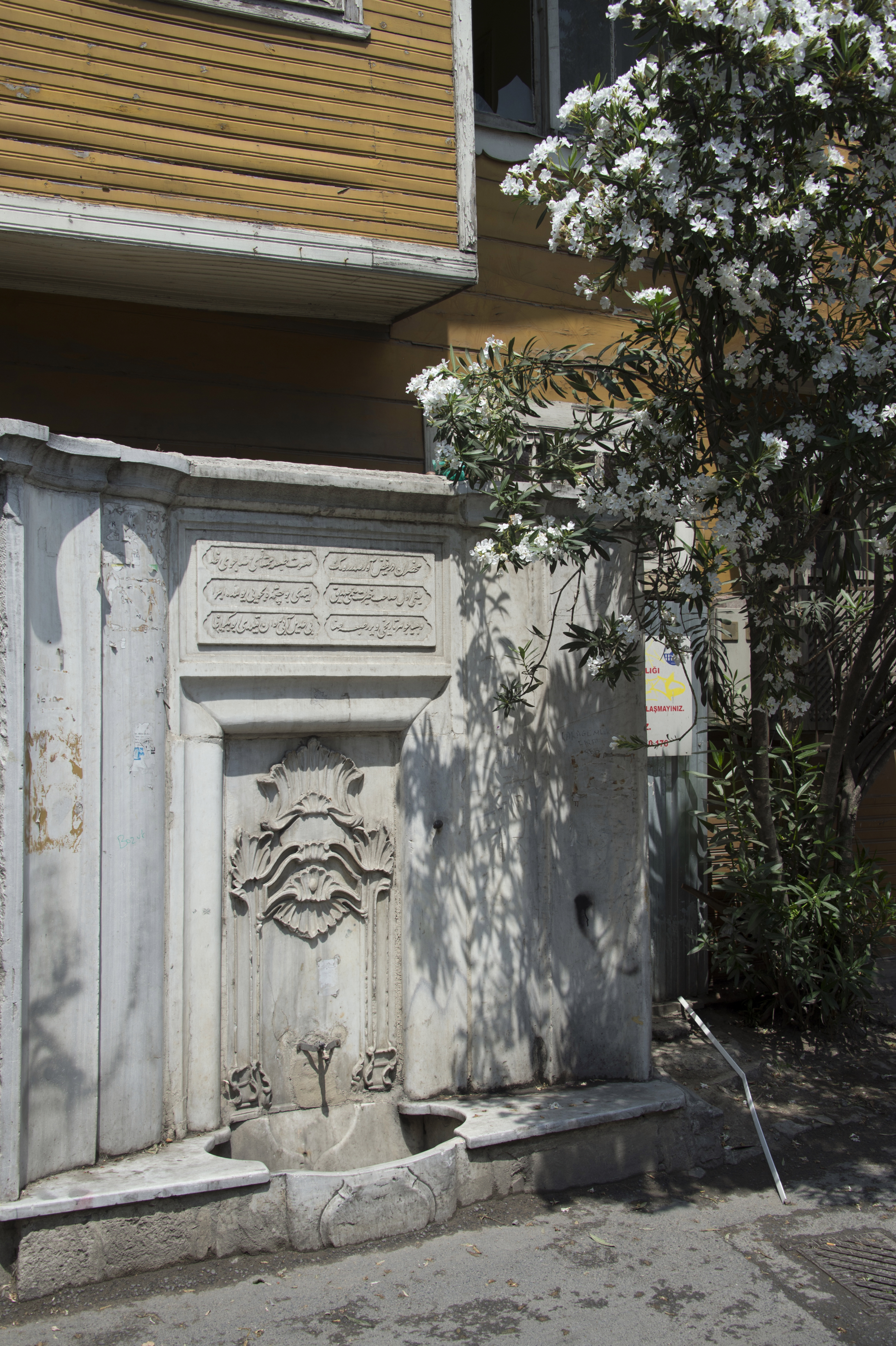
18th-century fountain of Ebûbekir Ağa
