= Çerkes Iskender Pasha =

Ottoman Governor of Egypt from 1569 to 1571

- چرکيس اسکندر پاشا

Ottoman Governor of Egypt
- In office 1569–1571
- Monarch: Selim II
- Preceded by: Koca Sinan Pasha
- Succeeded by: Koca Sinan Pasha

Çerkes Iskender Pasha (Ottoman Turkish: چرکيس اسکندر پاشا) (Arabic: شركس إسكندر باشا) was an Ottoman statesman who served as the Ottoman Governor of the Egypt Eyalet from 1569 to 1571, when the post was briefly abandoned by Koca Sinan Pasha.

He was known locally as al-Faqih (Arabic: الفقيه), "the jurist" by the local population.

Political offices
Preceded by Koca Sinan Pasha	Ottoman Governor of Egypt; 1569–1571	Succeeded by Koca Sinan Pasha
