= Lala (title) =

Ottoman, Safavid & Moghul title

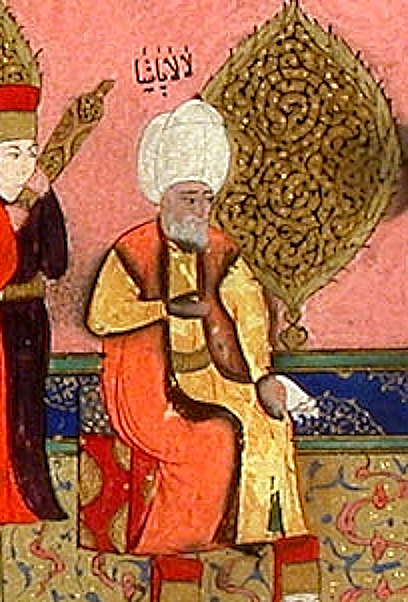
Lala Mustafa Pasha ("Lala Pasha"). Şeca'atname (1598)

Lala (Persian: لالا, Turkish: Lala, Azerbaijani: Lələ) was a Turkish and Persian title (of Persian origin) meaning a tutor and statesman in the Ottoman and Safavid Empires.

== History ==
In Ottoman tradition, lalas were experienced statesmen who were assigned as the tutors of young princes (Turkish: Şehzade). While still teenagers, the princes were sent to provinces (sanjak) as provincial governors (Turkish: sanjak bey). They were accompanied by their lalas who trained them in statesmanship. The purpose of this practice was to prepare the princes for the future duties of regency. Later, when a prince was enthroned as the sultan, his lala was usually promoted as a vizier. Up to the 13th sultan, Mehmet III (the end of the 16th century), all sultans enjoyed a period of provincial governorship prior to their reign. However, 14th sultan Ahmed I (1603–1617), who was enthroned in his early teens without a period of provincial governorship, banned this practice. This meant a decrease in the status of the lala.

== Atabeg vs Lala ==
The practice of lala was even older than the Ottoman Empire. During the Seljuk Empire, the experienced statesmen accompanying the princes were called Atabeg or Atabey (a Turkic composite title meaning ancestor-lord). However, the Seljuk Empire was highly feudalistic, and atabeys frequently used their power for separatist policies whenever they felt a weakness in the central authority. (like Eldiguzids in Azerbaijan and Zengids) The Ottoman Empire, on the other hand, was more centralist, and almost no lala tried to follow a separatist policy.

== Some grand viziers of lala background ==
Name	Term (as grand vizier)	Tutee
Bayezid Pasha	1413–1421	Mehmed I
Ibrahim Pasha	1498–1499	Bayezid II
Lala Mustafa Pasha	1580	Selim II
Lala Mehmed Pasha	1595	Mehmed III
Sokolluzade Lala Mehmed Pasha (in the capital)	1604–1606	Ahmed I

== See also ==
- Lalla (title)
