= Gliubizza =

The Gliubizza or Giubizza were a Venetian family active in Ulcinj in the second half of the 16th century. Before 1571, the region was part of Venetian Albania, until it was conquered by the Ottomans.

The family may have originated as the Lubici recorded near Scutari in 1417, when the Lubici brothers are mentioned in Podgora. According to an Italian source, the Gliubizza hailed from Budva.

Marco Gliubizza (fl. 1555), ser, was a grain merchant in Ulcinj. Andrea Giubizza was the Roman Catholic bishop of Ulcinj from 1558 until his death in 1565.

Alessandro Giubizza (fl. 1575–76) from Ulcinj had been employed at the court of Koca Sinan Pasha in Istanbul, then moved to Kotor where he is recorded in 1576. He gave information to the Venetian government in January 1576. Alessandro had been taken captive after the Ottoman capture of Ulcinj, but managed to have himself ransomed. His sister and nephew were released by Sinan Pasha, after which Alessandro stayed in Istanbul and became close with Mehmed Bey, Sinan Pasha's nephew. Alessandro and these came to an agreement that he would be informed of events against Venetian interest in the Kotor and border areas, in return he would buy luxury goods for Mehmed Bey in Venice. Alessandro called Sinan Pasha an Albanian and 'the first cousin of my mother'. Noel Malcolm believes that the family had a close family tie with Sinan Pasha, possibly through the Bruti family.

== Sources ==
- Dolcetti, Giovanni (1968). Il libro d'argento dei cittadini di Venezia e del Veneto. Vol. 4–5. Forni.
- Sarajevu, Zemaljski Muzej U. (1909). Glasnik Zemaljskog muzeja u Sarajevu. Vol. 21. p. 34.
- Gulin, Ante (2009). Pisma i poruke rektora Dalmacije i Mletačke Albanije. Hrvatska akademija znanosti i umjetnosti. ISBN 978-953-154-813-7.
- Malcolm, Noel (2015). Agents of Empire: Knights, Corsairs, Jesuits and Spies in the Sixteenth-century Mediterranean World. Oxford University Press. pp. 73, 254, 263–264, 362, 493. ISBN 978-0-19-026278-5.
- Zamputi, Injac (1989). Dokumente të shekujve XVI-XVII për historinë e Shqipërisë: 1507-1592. Akademia e Shkencave e RPS të Shqipërisë, Instituti i Historisë. p. 192.
