= Battle of Călugăreni =

1595 battle of the Ottoman Long War

- Part of the Long Turkish War and Ottoman–Wallachian wars
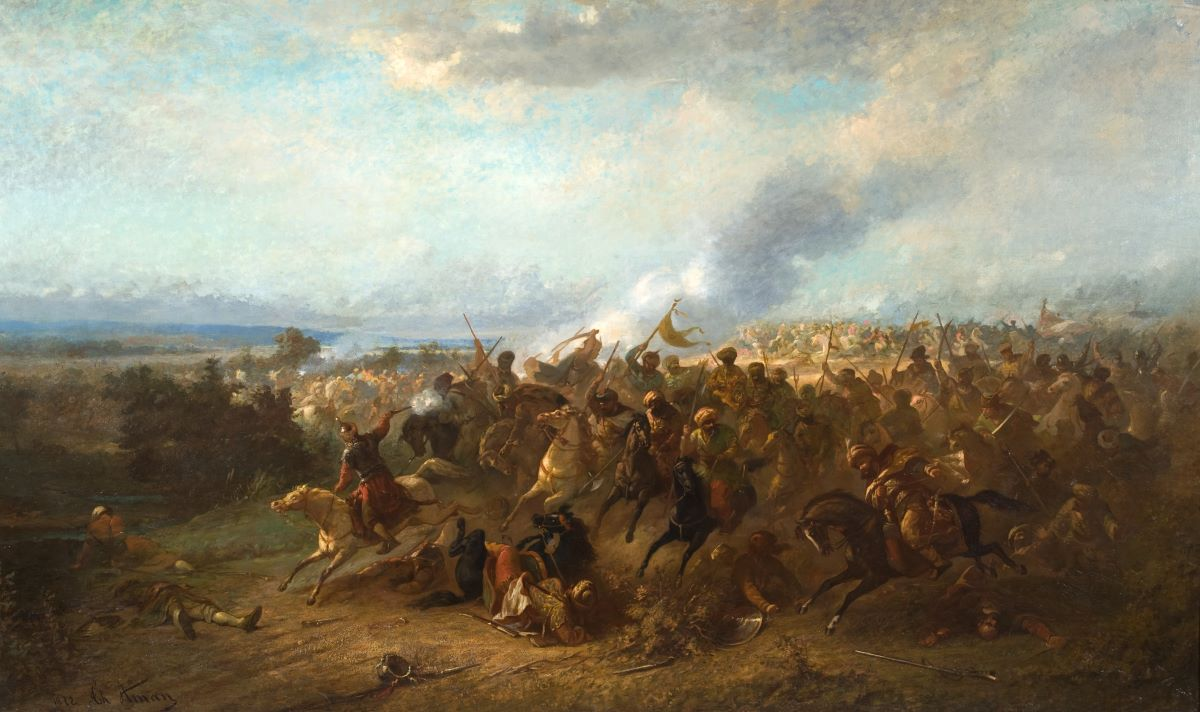
- Battle of Călugăreni by Theodor Aman
| Date | 23 August 1595 |
| Location | Călugăreni 44°11′00″N 26°00′00″E |
| Result | Wallachian victory |

Belligerents
| Wallachia; Transylvania; Zaporozhian Cossacks | Ottoman Empire |

Commanders and leaders
| Michael the Brave (Transylvania) Albert Király | Koca Sinan Pasha; Tiryaki Hasan Pasha; Mehmet Satîrgi Pasha |

Strength
| 15,000 Wallachians; 6,000 Székelys; Few hundred Cossacks; 12 cannons | 85,000–100,000; c. 30,000–40,000 engaged |

Casualties and losses
| Unknown | 3,000 dead, 4 pashas and 7 sanjak-beys killed, 15 cannons lost, a green flag of the prophet Muhammad lost |
- Location within Romania

The Battle of Călugăreni took place during the history of early modern Romania on 23 August [O.S. 13 August] 1595 between the Wallachian army led by Michael the Brave and the Ottoman army led by Koca Sinan Pasha. It was part of the Long Turkish War, fought between Christian and Ottoman forces at the end of the 16th and the beginning of the 17th centuries.

The whole Ottoman force was estimated at 100,000 men, but not all of their troops were on the battlefield at Călugăreni. It seems that only about 30,000-40,000 Ottoman soldiers were involved in the battle.

Michael the Brave had in total about 15,000 men and about 12 large field cannons, with Transylvanian (Székely) detachments and Cossack mercenaries. Michael strategically positioned his forces south of the village of Călugăreni, where the Câlniștea river flows into the Neajlov river. The terrain there was a muddy marsh, surrounded by forests that would negate the Ottomans' military superiority. The battle had three different phases. A narrow bridge over the Neajlov river was used by Michael as a mandatory pass point where he successfully held a large Ottoman attack, although a second Ottoman assault supported by flanking cavalry forced the Wallachians to retreat. However a Wallachian counterattack on the pursuing Ottomans forced them back over the river, ending the battle as Michael would retreat during the night. The Ottomans suffered much heavier casualties.

== First phase of the battle ==
The day of 23 August started with probing cavalry attacks. The Wallachian cavalry surprised the Ottoman cavalry in front of the village and pushed it over the Neajlov river. Michael the Brave positioned himself with 10,000 troops and 10 cannons north of the Neajlov river and south of the village. The Székely mercenary Captain Albert Király was in charge of the reserve of 6,000 Székely troops. The reserve was positioned rather far, north-west of the village, to stop any possible attack from the direction of the village of Singureni. The reserve didn't engage the Ottomans in this battle, maintaining its position.

After the cavalry skirmish, Koca Sinan Pasha sent forward a force 12,000 strong. Michael the Brave waited for the Ottoman forces to cross the river and, after a heavy artillery bombardment, attacked fiercely pushing the Turks back over the river. The first phase of the battle ended favorably for the Wallachians.

== Second phase of the battle ==
The second phase started at noon, when Sinan Pasha launched a decisive attack with all the forces he had at that moment. Janissaries made a frontal attack over the bridge while other forces made a double flanking maneuver (Mehmet Satîrgi Pasha in the east and Hasan Pasha (beylerbey of Rumelia) in the west, passing over Neajlov by the bridge of Singureni). Janissaries attacked not only on the bridge, but also used logs and planks to help them cross the marsh. Initially their attack was stopped, but Ottoman cavalry managed to cross the river via a ford in the east and threatened the Wallachian left wing. Michael retreated, abandoning all his cannons. He rallied his troops north of the village where he stopped the Ottoman advance. The second phase of the battle ended favorably for the Ottomans.

== Third phase of the battle ==
The third and last phase of the battle took place in the afternoon and started with a strong frontal Wallachian attack, led by Michael the Brave. Captain Cocea had just returned from a scouting mission with 400 cavalry and his fresh forces were used in this attack in a flanking maneuver. Mehmet Satîrgi Pasha's troops were pushed into the Janissaries and the Ottoman forces were crowded in a narrow space north of the Neajlov river. The Wallachian counterattack reached the bridge and the cannons were retaken and used to inflict many casualties on the Ottomans. Sinan Pasha tried to restore the situation by advancing with his personal guard, but the Ottoman forces dispersed in disarray when Captain Cocea's cavalry attacked them in the rear. The Wallachians attacked the Ottoman camp simultaneously, which was near Hulubești village. In the disorganized retreat, legend has it that Michael the Brave, true to his name, took a battle axe and (as Robert the Bruce had done to Sir Henry de Bohun at the battle of Bannockburn) threw Sinan Pasha from his horse and into the marsh, but he was saved by one of his slaves. The Wallachians were unable to pursue the fleeing Ottomans because Hasan Pasha appeared on their right flank. Michael the Brave turned with all his men against Hasan Pasha and routed his forces.

== Aftermath of the battle ==
Michael the Brave knew that he still was greatly outnumbered, and during the night he retreated northwards. He abandoned both Bucharest and Târgoviște, stopping at the winter camp in Stoenești, near the Rucăr-Bran Pass.

Sinan Pasha captured the capital, Bucharest, and left a garrison consisting of 10,000 troops led by Mehmed Pasha. He then captured Târgoviște where he left another garrison consisting of 1,500 troops and 30 cannons. The bulk of the Ottoman army advanced to Stoenești, where it took positions in front of the Wallachian army, but did not attack.

On 6 September, the Transylvanian prince Sigismund Báthory arrived with around 7,500 cavalry to support Michael the Brave. In early October another 1,500 troops from the Habsburg Empire and 300 cavalry from Tuscany arrived. These combined forces attacked the Ottomans and eventually defeated them at Târgoviște (18 October), Bucharest (22 October), and Giurgiu (26 October).

== Literature ==
In Romanian:

- Alexandru Atanasiu, Bătălia de la Călugăreni, 1595, București, 1928.
- Nicolae Bălcescu, Românii supt Mihai-voievod Viteazul, în Opere, vol. III, București, 1986.
- George Coșbuc, Pașa Hassan

In Turkish:

- Haluk Arif, (2004) "Devlet". Kitabi Indirim Insat.
