= Lala Mehmed Pasha =

Grand Vizier of the Ottoman Empire (1595)

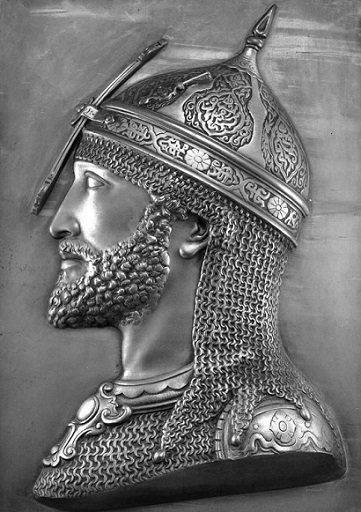

Grand Vizier of the Ottoman Empire
- In office 19 November 1595 – 28 November 1595
- Monarch: Mehmed III
- Preceded by: Koca Sinan Pasha
- Succeeded by: Koca Sinan Pasha

Personal details
- Born: Gölmarmara, Ottoman Empire
- Died: 28 November 1595 Istanbul, Ottoman Empire

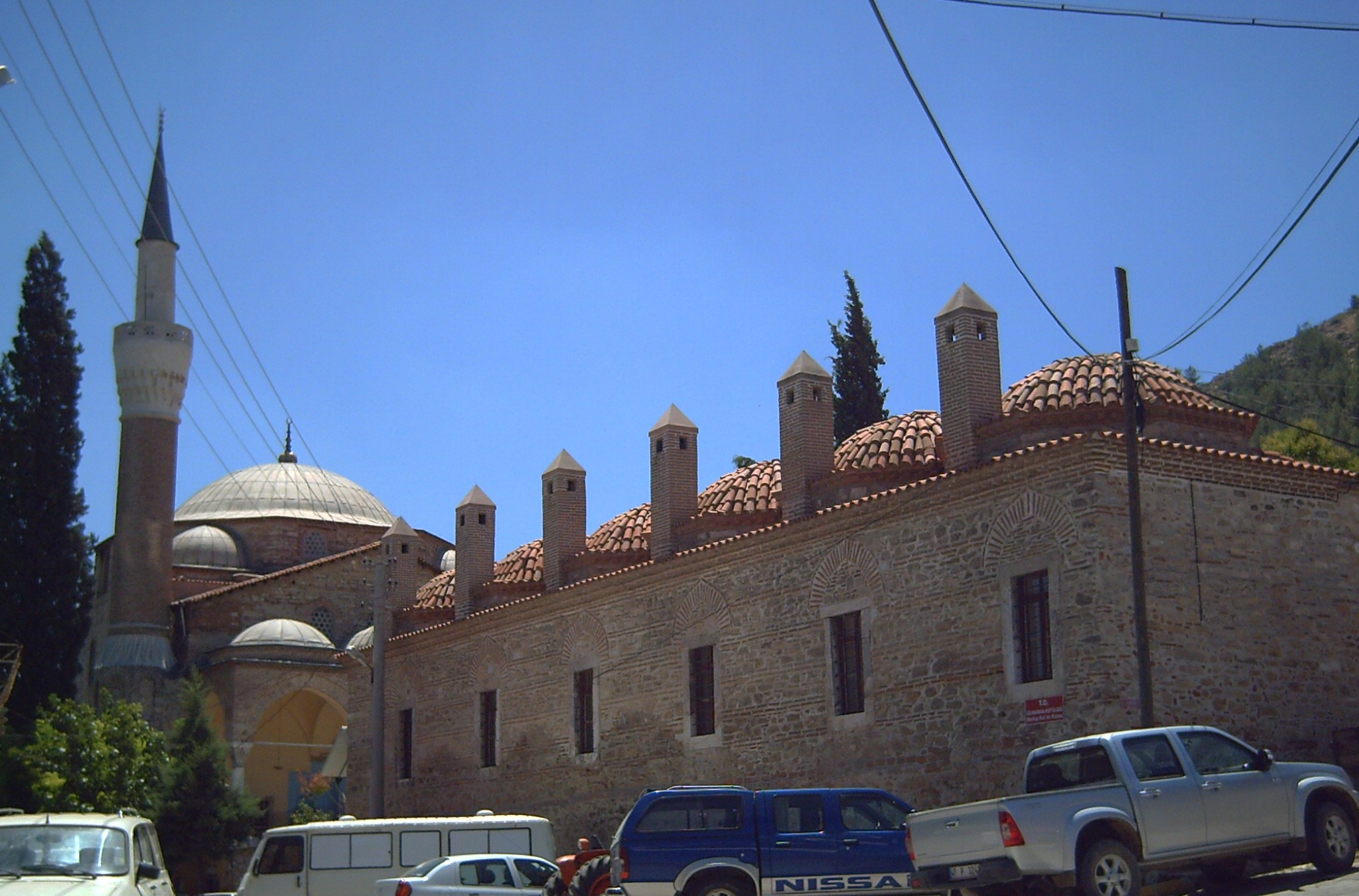
Halime Hatun Religious Complex in Gölmarmara built by the Sultan Mehmed III during his tenure in Manisa (1583–1595) in the name of his wet nurse and future Grand Vizier Tekeli Lala Mehmed Pasha's mother-in-law Halime Hatun.

Lala Mehmed Pasha (died 28 November 1595) was an Ottoman military commander and Grand Vizier of the Ottoman Empire under the reign of Mehmed III. He was of Turkish origin.

Born in Gölmarmara in western Anatolia, he became a lala (tutor) to the Sultan Murad III and then to his son Mehmed III, hence his nickname. After marrying the daughter of Mehmed III's daye (wet nurse) Halime Khatun, Mehmed Pasha rose to serve as Grand Vizier in 1595, the first year of Mehmed III's reign, although only for a few days before he suddenly died. His lineage continued for centuries, leading down to Husein Avni Pasha.

== See also ==
- List of Ottoman grand viziers

Political offices
Preceded by Koca Sinan Pasha	Grand Vizier of the Ottoman Empire; 19 November 1595 – 28 November 1595	Succeeded by Koca Sinan Pasha
