= Gölmarmara =

- District and municipality
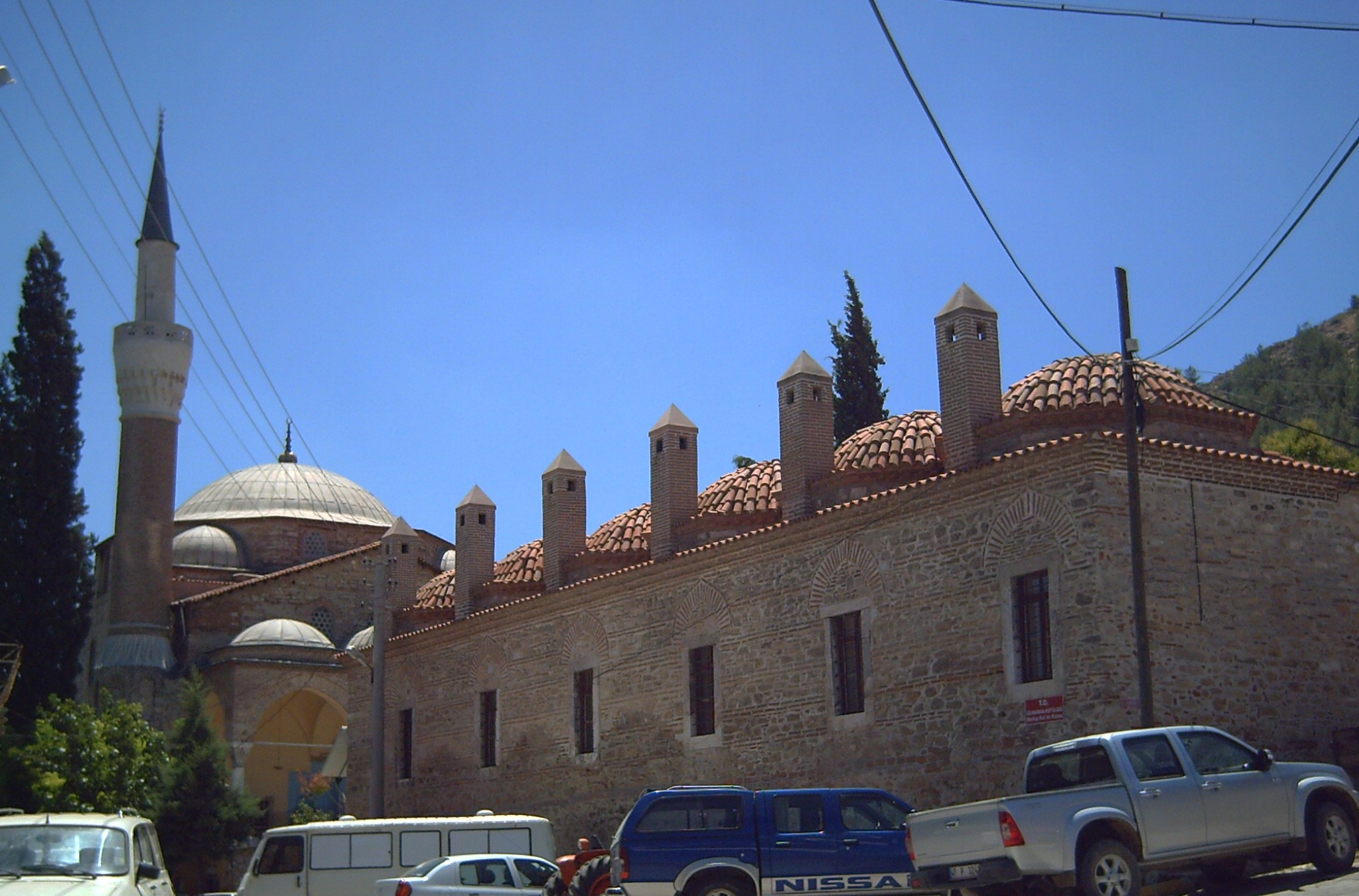
- Halime Hatun Religious Complex

- Map showing Gölmarmara District in Manisa Province

- Location within Turkey Location within Turkey Aegean
- Coordinates: 38°43′N 27°55′E
- Country: Turkey
- Province: Manisa

Government
  - Mayor: Cem Aykan (CHP)
- Area: 310 km^{2} (120 sq mi)
- Elevation: 91 m (299 ft)
- Population (2022): 15,193
  - Density: 49/km^{2} (130/sq mi)
- Time zone: UTC+3 (TRT)
- Postal code: 45580
- Area code: 0236
- Website: www.golmarmara.bel.tr

Gölmarmara is a municipality and district of Manisa Province, Turkey. Its area is 310 km^{2}, and its population is 15,193 (2022). It lies at a distance of 66 km (41 mi) from the province center of Manisa. The town owes its name to the nearby Lake Marmara, called under various names throughout history. The town of Gölmarmara itself was a mere village in Ottoman times cited under such names as "Marmaracık" or "Mermere". It was made into a township with its own municipality depending the district center of Akhisar at the time of the foundation of the Turkish Republic (1923) and in 1987 a district center by its own right and under the same name, Gölmarmara. Gölmarmara lies at an elevation of 91 m (299 ft).

Agricultural lands and forest lands each occupy roughly around 11,500 hectares in the district area, with a few thousand in the fertile plain of the Gediz River valley remaining unused. Lake Marmara, aside from being a recreational center for the province as a whole, is also an important source for fishing and agricultural irrigation. Slightly lower than the town center at 79 m (259 ft), the lake is also an Important Bird Area.

There are six primary schools and two high schools in Gölmarmara, with a total teacher's corpus of 117 and a student's corpus of 3,094. A small professional higher school depending Celal Bayar University is also located in Gölmarmara, its academic corpus composed of six teachers providing education higher education with a professional focus to 144 students.

The town's most important historical building is Halime Hatun Religious Complex built by the Ottoman sultan Mehmed III during his tenure in Manisa (1583-1595) in the name of his wet nurse and his future grand vizier Tekeli Lala Mehmed Pasha's mother-in-law Halime Hatun.

In 2015 an important archaeological discovery was made at Kaymakçı: a Middle and Late Bronze Age city (2000-1200 BC) whose area was approximately 4 times larger than that of Troy.

== Composition ==
There are 21 neighbourhoods in Gölmarmara District:

- Atatürk
- Ayanlar
- Beyler
- Çamköy
- Çömlekçi
- Değnekler
- Eskicami
- Hacıbaştanlar
- Hacıveliler
- Hıroğlu
- İhsaniye
- İsmetpaşa
- Kayaaltı
- Kayapınar
- Kılcanlar
- Ozanca
- Taşkuyucak
- Tiyenli
- Yenicami
- Yeniköy
- Yunuslar
