= Pearl Kiosk =

Ottoman mansion in Istanbul, Turkey

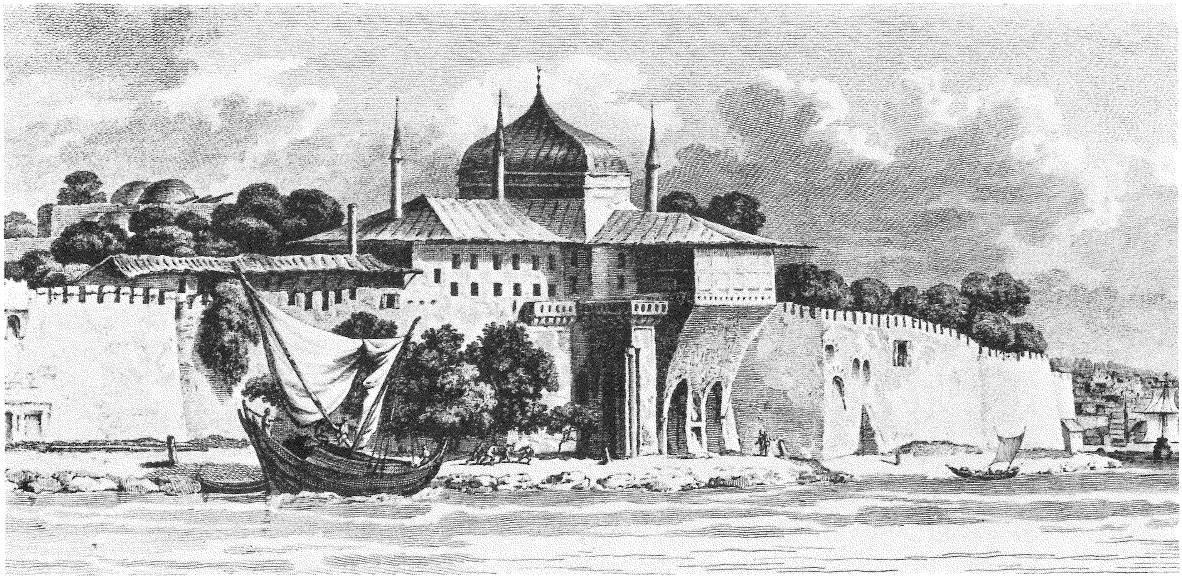
The Pearl Kiosk by the Marmara shore. 18th-century etching by Choiseul-Gouffier.

The Pearl Kiosk (Turkish: İncili Köşk) was a mansion directly located at the banks of the Bosphorus and served as a pleasure building for the Ottoman sultan. It was built in 1590 by the grand vizier Koca Sinan Pasha.

== Literature ==
- Fanny Davis. Palace of Topkapi in Istanbul. 1970. ASIN B000NP64Z2
- Necipoğlu, Gülru (1991). Architecture, ceremonial, and power: The Topkapi Palace in the fifteenth and sixteenth centuries. Cambridge, Massachusetts: The MIT Press. pp. 336 pages. ISBN 0-262-14050-0.
