= Battle of Giurgiu (1595) =

Christian victory in the Long Turkish War

- Part of the Long Turkish War and Ottoman–Wallachian wars
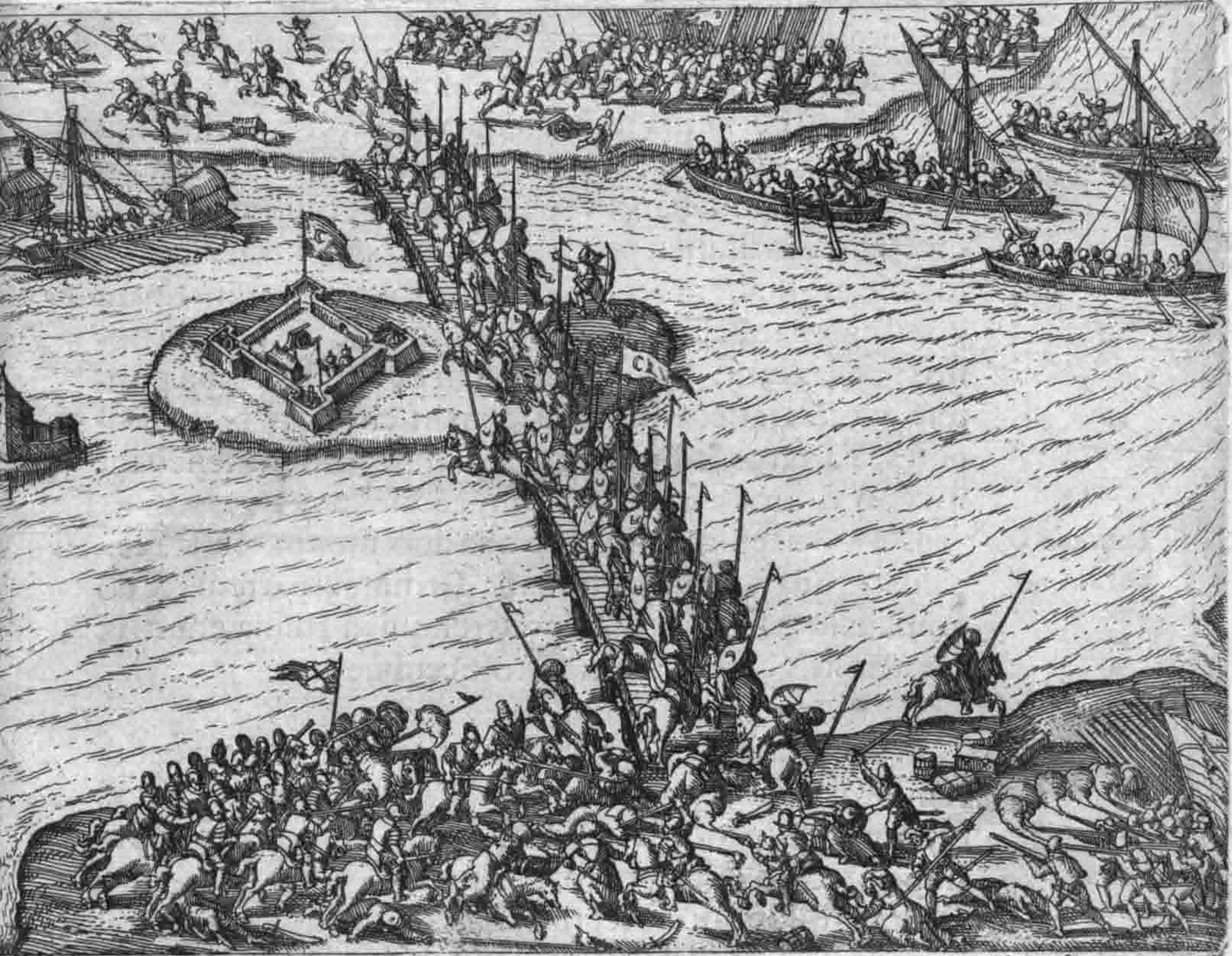
- The battle as depicted by Johann Adam Lonicer
Date	27–30 October 1595
Location	Giurgiu
Result	Transylvanian–Wallachian–Moldavian victory

Belligerents
Transylvania; Wallachia; Moldavia; Holy Roman Empire; Zaporozhian Cossacks	Ottoman Empire

Commanders and leaders
(Transylvania) Stephen Bocskay; Michael the Brave (Transylvania) Sigismund Báthory (Moldavia) Ștefan Răzvan	(Ottoman Empire) Sinan Pasha

Strength
50,000–51,000: 39,000 Transylvanian army (23,000 Székelys, and 16,000 soldiers sent by feudal estates, Habsburgs, and Moldavia); 8,000 Wallachians; 3,000 Moldavians; 300 Cossacks; 1,500 mercenaries sent by Maximilian III, Archduke of Austria; Artillery and 300 knights from Tuscany (under Silvio Piccolomini)	c. 40,000 (October 1595)

Casualties and losses
Unknown, thousands	5,000–10,000 killed, 2 ships sunk, destruction of the Akinji corps

The Battle of Giurgiu, also known as the Bridge Disaster (Turkish: Köprü Faciası), took place on 27–30 October 1595. It was part of the Long Turkish War (1593–1606), a border conflict between the Christian powers and the Ottoman Empire over Balkan territories. The battle ended with the combined Transylvanian–Wallachian army driving the Ottomans out of Wallachia, which was completely liberated from Ottoman forces.

== Background ==
For decades, Wallachia had been under Ottoman control and had to obey the sultan. The Wallachian rulers acted as representatives of the Ottomans and were required to provide soldiers to support the Ottoman army. However, Principality of Transylvania changed its policy and offered support, giving Wallachia a chance to fight against the Ottomans. In 1594, Michael the Brave, Voivode of Wallachia, formed a secret alliance with Sigismund Báthory, Prince of Transylvania to resist Ottoman rule. Aaron the Tyrant, Voivode of Moldavia also joined the alliance, and Michael launched attacks on Ottoman strongholds along the Danube. Istanbul depended on Wallachia for food, and Michael's rebellion caused serious food shortages. In 1595, a 100,000–85,000 or 40,000-strong Ottoman army under the command of Grand Vizier Koca Sinan Pasha marched to suppress the Wallachian rebellion. Wallachia acknowledged Sigismund's suzerainty on 20 May, followed by Moldavia on 3 July. Sigismund was therefore obligated to protect his new vassals.

Michael had an army of 17,000 soldiers, including a strong Transylvanian Székely contingent. On 23 August, he stopped Sinan Pasha's advance at the Battle of Călugăreni. However, the Ottoman army was much larger, forcing Michael to retreat into the Carpathian Mountains with only 8,000 soldiers remaining.

Sigismund Báthori increased his preparations for war, however, his army, together with troops from the feudal estates, the Habsburgs, and Moldavia's new ruler, Ştefan Răzvan, could muster only 16,000 soldiers. Sigismund called the Székelys to join his army, even though they had been forced into servitude about 25 years earlier. Around 15,000 Székelys gathered at a military camp near Feketehalom (now Codlea, Romania). On 15 September, Sigismund agreed to restore their freedom. A few days later, another 8,000 Székelys arrived at the camp. The commander-in-chief of the Transylvanian army, Stephen Bocskai ordered the troops to march and in October, nearly 40,000 soldiers crossed the border near Brassó (now Brașov, Romania) to join Michael's army.

The Ottoman army, which entered Bucharest on 28 August, built a wooden castle there, and then occupied Târgoviște, the capital of the Wallachia, on 18 September, and also built a castle here.

The allied armies recaptured Târgoviște from the Ottomans on 18 October. Two days later, Sinan Pasha abandoned Bucharest. But Bocskai and Michael pursued his retreating forces and caught up with them at Giurgiu, on the Danube.

These latest developments (most of the soldiers were on their way back) increased the disorganization in the Ottoman army. Realizing this fact during the poll in Bucharest, Koca Sinan Pasha gave the order to withdraw to Rusçuk by crossing the Danube. He removed the cannons and ammunition from the Bucharest castle to ensure they do not fall into the hands of the Wallachian army and had the castle destroyed. He left a rearguard in Bucharest to secure the army's withdrawal and advanced towards the river crossing. Sokolluzade Hasan Pasha joined the main army a day later with artillery and ammunition, and the rearguard in Bucharest joined the main army four days later.

The army arrived around the castle and stayed here for three days by the order of Koca Sinan Pasha. Sinan Pasha banned the passage from the bridge to the other side of the Danube and appointed an emin and a clerk to the bridgehead and collected the pencik tax for two days. During this process, a huge accumulation occurred at the beginning of the bridge due to the presence of more than 10,000 animals and thousands of prisoners along with the soldiers. For this reason, some of the soldiers drove along the Danube towards Svishtov, and Rahova, crossing on ships from Nikopol.

== Battle ==
The news that the Wallachian army was approaching further increased the disorder in the Ottoman army gathered at the bridgehead. Koca Sinan Pasha had his Kapıkulu soldiers crossed the bridge to the Rusçuk side on the night of 26-27 October. He also had the big guns Shahi and ammunition transported at night. A large number of soldiers crossed to the other shore by ship without waiting in line at the bridge. After performing the morning prayer, Koca Sinan Pasha went to Danube. However, the bulk of the soldiers, the weights, the captives, and the beasts of burden remained on the side.

After the departure of Koca Sinan Pasha, some of the remaining soldiers took shelter in Yergöğü Castle, while the rest attacked the bridge. At the beginning of the already narrow bridge, pack animals and soldiers created a huge stampede and some soldiers fell into the Danube and drowned. When the troops under the command of Sokolluzade Hasan Pasha, who were given the duty of Karakol (outpost), were dispersed in the conflict with the vanguards of the Wallachian army.

Then, the entire Wallachian army came to the region and infantrymen with rifles attacked the Ottoman soldiers waiting to cross. Simultaneously, Transylvanian artillery destroyed the bridge. Akinjis, and Yörüks tried to resist by taking battle formations, but many of them died. Akinji Corps suffered heavy casualties that day, causing them to withdraw from the stage of history.

Although the main Ottoman army succeeded in crossing the Danube river, the garrison and rearguard troops were massacred.

The Wallachian army, which almost destroyed what was left of the Ottoman army, then besieged and captured this castle on 27 October with the skill of Italian artillery (from the Grand Duchy of Tuscany) under the command of Silvio Piccolomini.

By 29 October, Wallachia had been completely liberated from Ottoman forces.

== Sources ==
- Zsigmond Báthori, Michael the Brave, and Giorgio Basta; Сигизмунд Батори, Михай Храбри и Джорджо Баста
- Várkonyi R., Ágnes (1985). Pach, Zsigmond Pál (ed.). Magyarország története 1526–1686. Budapest: Akadémiai Kiadó. ISBN 963-05-4098-3.
