= Koca Sinan Pasha =

Grand Vizier of the Ottoman Empire (1580–82, 1589–91, 1593–95, 1595–96)

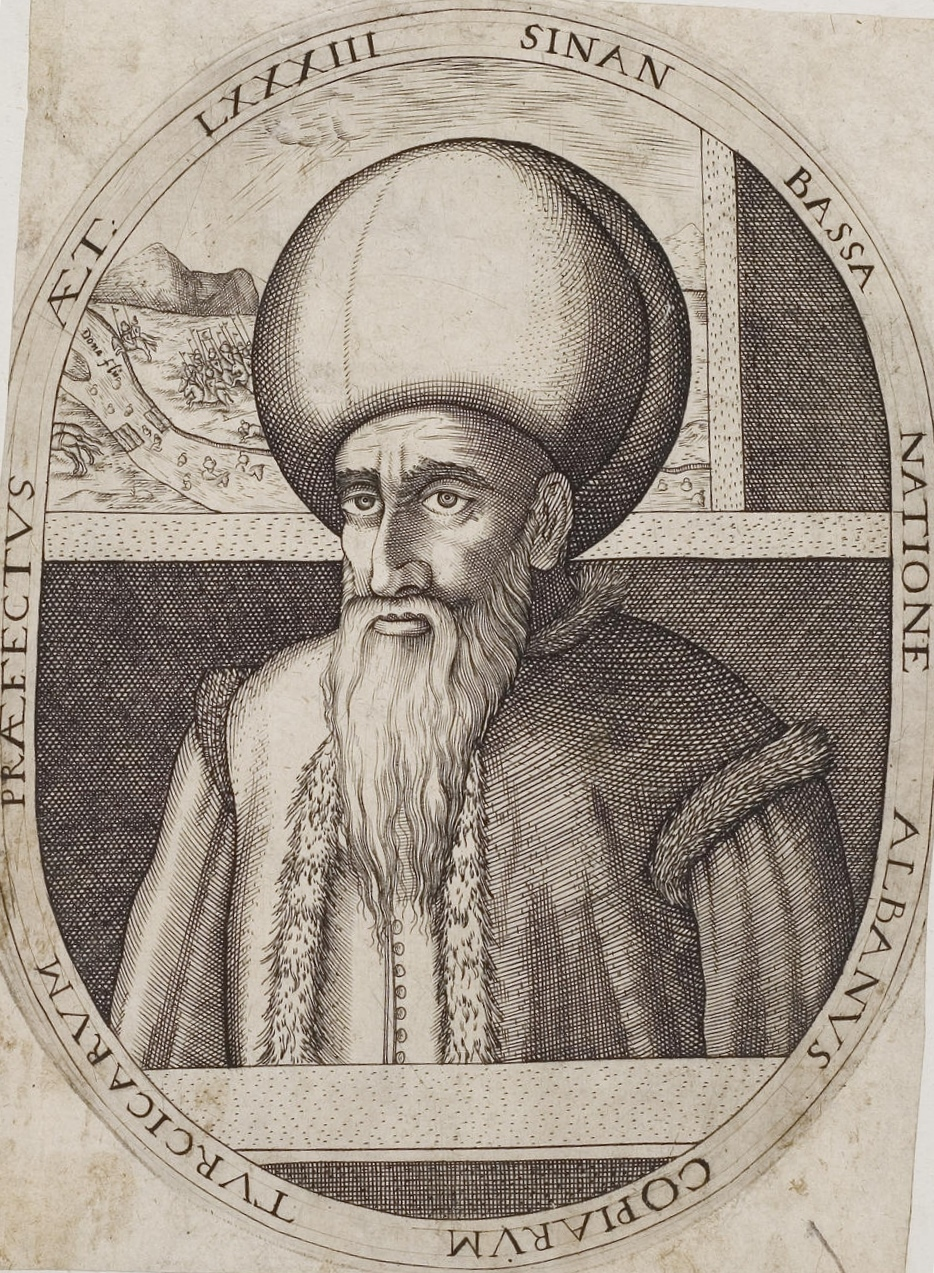
- Engraving, c.1595

Grand Vizier of the Ottoman Empire
- In office 1 December 1595 – 3 April 1596
- Monarch: Mehmed III
- Preceded by: Lala Mehmed Pasha
- Succeeded by: Damat Ibrahim Pasha
- In office 7 July 1595 – 19 November 1595
- Monarch: Mehmed III
- Preceded by: Ferhad Pasha
- Succeeded by: Lala Mehmed Pasha
- In office 28 January 1593 – 16 February 1595
- Monarch: Murad III
- Preceded by: Kanijeli Siyavuş Pasha
- Succeeded by: Ferhad Pasha
- In office 14 April 1589 – 1 August 1591
- Monarch: Murad III
- Preceded by: Kanijeli Siyavuş Pasha
- Succeeded by: Ferhad Pasha
- In office 7 August 1580 – 6 December 1582
- Monarch: Murad III
- Preceded by: Lala Kara Mustafa Pasha
- Succeeded by: Kanijeli Siyavuş Pasha

Ottoman Governor of Egypt
- In office 1571–1573
- Preceded by: Çerkes Iskender Pasha
- Succeeded by: Hüseyin Pasha Boljanić
- In office 1567–1569
- Preceded by: Mahmud Pasha
- Succeeded by: Çerkes Iskender Pasha

Personal details
- Born: c. 1506 Topojan, Ottoman Empire (modern-day Albania)
- Died: 3 April 1596 (aged 89–90) Constantinople, Ottoman Empire (modern-day Turkey)
- Spouse: Esmehan Hanımsultan
- Children: Mehmed Pasha; Emine Hanim; Hatice Hanim; Hüma Hanim
- Ethnicity: Albanian

Military service
- Battles/wars: Conquest of Yemen; Battle of Al-Qahira (1569); Conquest of Tunis (1574); Ottoman–Safavid War (1578–1590); Battle of Çıldır; Long Turkish War; Siege of Veszprém; Siege of Várpalota (1593); Uprising in Banat; Battle of Călugăreni; Battle of Giurgiu; Siege of Győr (1594)

Koca Sinan Pasha (Turkish: Koca Sinan Paşa, "Sinan the Great", Albanian: Koxha Sinan Pasha; c. 1506 – 3 April 1596) was an Albanian-born Ottoman Grand Vizier, military figure, and statesman. From 1580 until his death he served five times as Grand Vizier. He is remembered as one of the most capable men in a long line of Grand Viziers throughout Ottoman history.

== Early life ==
Sinan Pasha, also known as Koca Sinan (Sinan the Great), was born in Topojan in Luma territory and was of Albanian origin. In a Ragusan document of 1571 listing members of the Ottoman Sultan's governing council, Sinan is described as coming from a Roman Catholic family that converted to Islam. His father was named Ali Bey and Sinan Pasha had family ties with Catholic relatives such as the Giubizzas. Austrian orientalist Joseph von Hammer-Purgstall called him the "unbridled Albanian". Mustafa Ali of Gallipoli repeatedly criticized Sinan for promoting an Albanian clique in the administration.

== Career ==
Sinan Pasha was appointed governor of Ottoman Egypt in 1569, and was subsequently involved until 1571 in the conquest of Yemen, becoming known as Fātiḥ-i Yemen ("Conqueror of Yemen").

In 1580, Sinan commanded the army against the Safavids in the Ottoman–Safavid War (1578–1590), and was appointed grand vizier by Sultan Murad III. Sinan was, however, disgraced and exiled in the following year, owing to the defeat of his lieutenant Mehmed Pasha, at Gori during an attempt to provision the Ottoman garrison of Tbilisi.

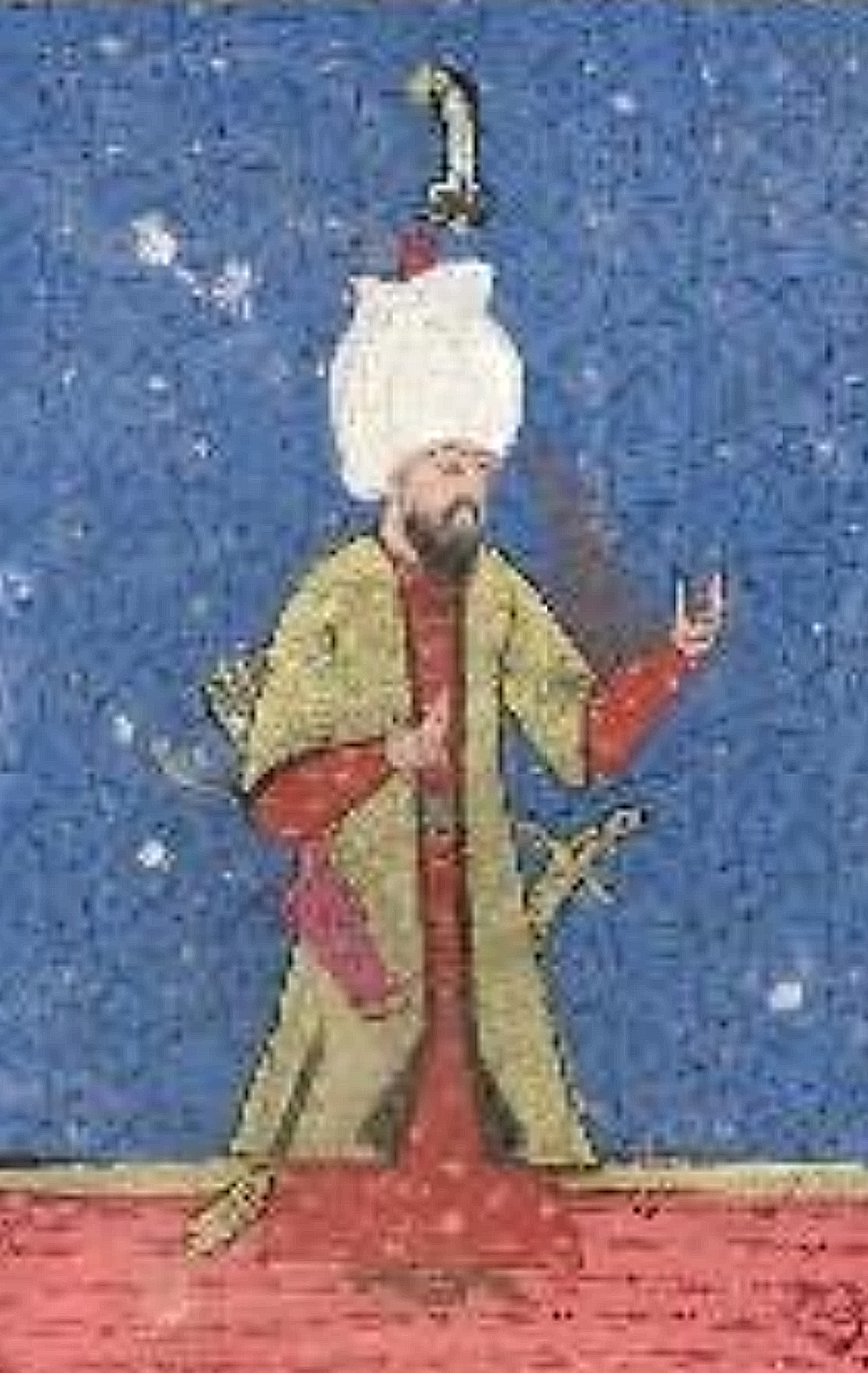
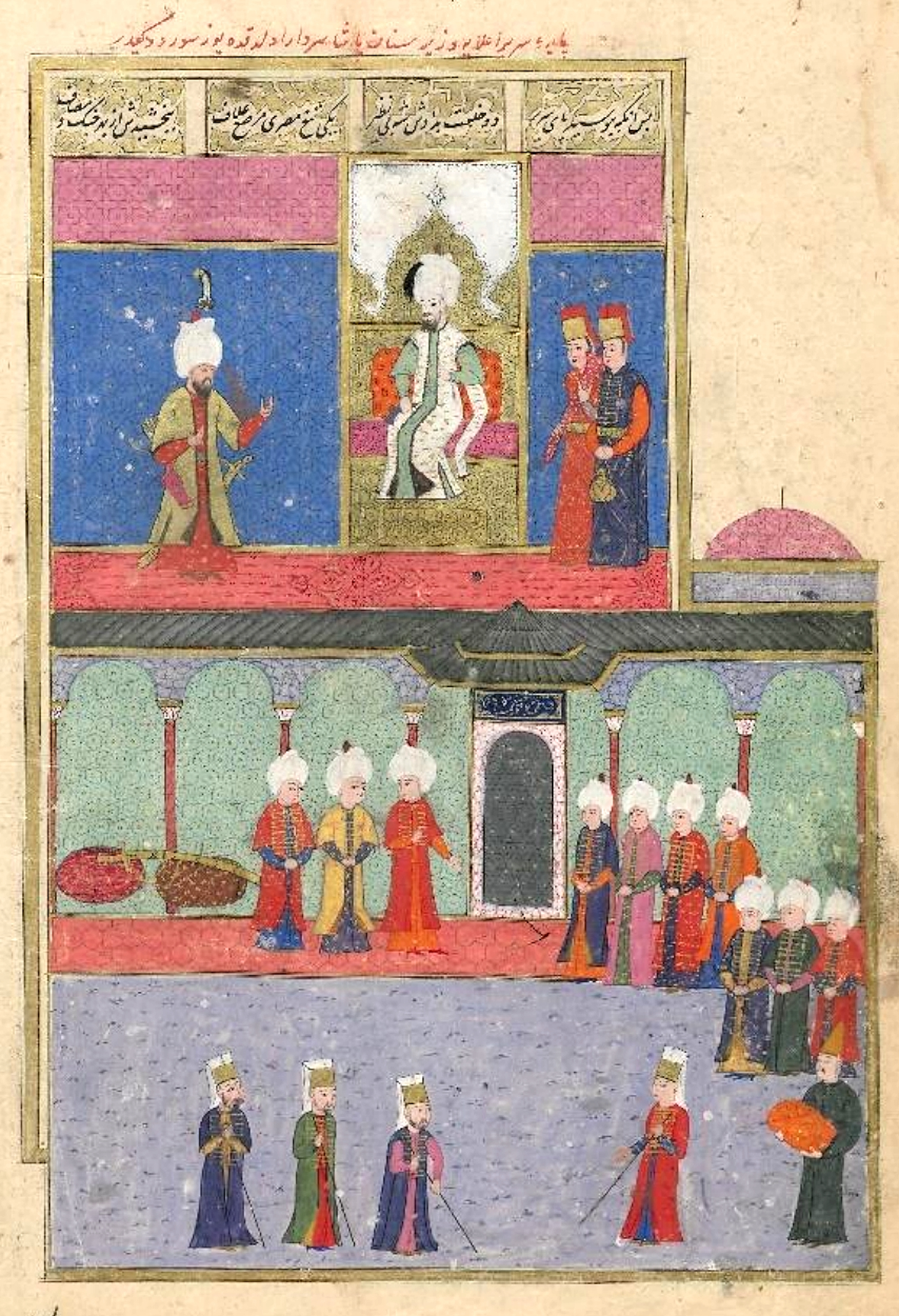
Sinan Pasha at the awarding of a robe of honour by Murad III. Şehinşahname (1592)

Sinan subsequently became governor of Damascus and, in 1589, after the great revolt of the Janissaries, was appointed grand vizier for the second time. He was involved in the competition for the throne in Wallachia between Mihnea Turcitul and Petru Cercel, and ultimately sided with the former, overseeing Petru's execution in March 1590. Another revolt of Janissaries led to his dismissal in 1591, but in 1593 he was again recalled to become grand vizier for the third time, and in the same year he commanded the Ottoman army in the Long War against the Habsburgs. He was faced with massive casualties on the northern front, which was weakened by the death of Bosnian commander Telli Hasan Pasha during the Battle of Sisak. In 1593, he captured Veszprém and Palota after 3–4 days of siege and turned his attention to the Sisak, where Telli Hasan Pasha and Ahmed Pasha had died. He soon captured Sisak and came back to Belgrade through Novi Sad.

When the Habsburgs invaded Szécsény and Nógrád he demanded help from Istanbul. The agha of Janissaries, Sokolluzade Lala Mehmed Pasha, came to help in a short time. In 1593, Sinan Pasha successfully besieged Veszprém and Várpalota. In 1594, he captured Györ (Yanıkkale). In 1594 during the Uprising in Banat, Sinan ordered for the relics (remains) of Saint Sava to be brought from Mileševa to Belgrade, where he then had them set on fire in order to discourage the Serbs.

In spite of his victories he was again deposed in February 1595, shortly after the accession of Mehmed III, and banished to Malkara. In August, Sinan was in power again, called on to lead the expedition against Prince Michael the Brave of Wallachia. His defeat in the Battle of Călugăreni, the Battle of Giurgiu, and the series of unsuccessful confrontations with the Habsburgs (culminating in the devastating siege and fall of Ottoman-held Esztergom), brought him once more into disfavour, and he was deprived of the seal of office on 19 November.

The death of his successor Lala Mehmed Pasha three days later caused Sinan to become grand vizier for the fifth time. He died suddenly in the spring of 1596, leaving behind a large fortune. Sinan Pasha is buried in Istanbul near the Grand Bazaar.

== Family ==
He married Esmehan Hanımsultan, granddaughter of Sultan Selim I. They had a son, Mehmed Pasha, and three daughters, Emine Hanım, Hatice Hanım and Hüma Hanım.

== Legacy ==
Sinan Pasha became grand vizier five times between 1580 and his death in 1596. He had many rivals but he was also a very wealthy man. During his lifetime Sinan Pasha was criticized by Ottoman bureaucrats such as Mustafa Âlî who wrote that Sinan promoted Albanians into the Ottoman government and military. Contemporary Turkish historians also note that he remained close to his heritage and would give those of Albanian stock preference for high-level positions within the empire. In 1586, at his request, Sultan Murad III issued a decree exempting five villages in Luma from all taxes. Sinan Pasha constructed the fortress of Kaçanik in the Kosovo Vilayet with an imaret (soup kitchen), two hans (Inn), a hamam (Turkish bathhouse) and a mosque that still bears his name.

In 1590, he had the Pearl Kiosk built above the seaward walls on the sea of Marmara. It served as Murad III's final residence before his death. One of his final projects in Constantinople was a külliye completed in from 1593 to 1594 by Davut Aga, the chief imperial architect of the time. It is distinguished by the complex masonry and decorations of its türbe and sebil.

He was a major builder of caravanserais, bridges, baths and mosques. These included the town of Kaçanik in Kosovo, important buildings in Sarajevo, Thessalonika and Belgrade, as well as in Istanbul and other countries in the Arab world. He was a big supporter of Queen Mother Safiye Sultan who was also of Albanian origin

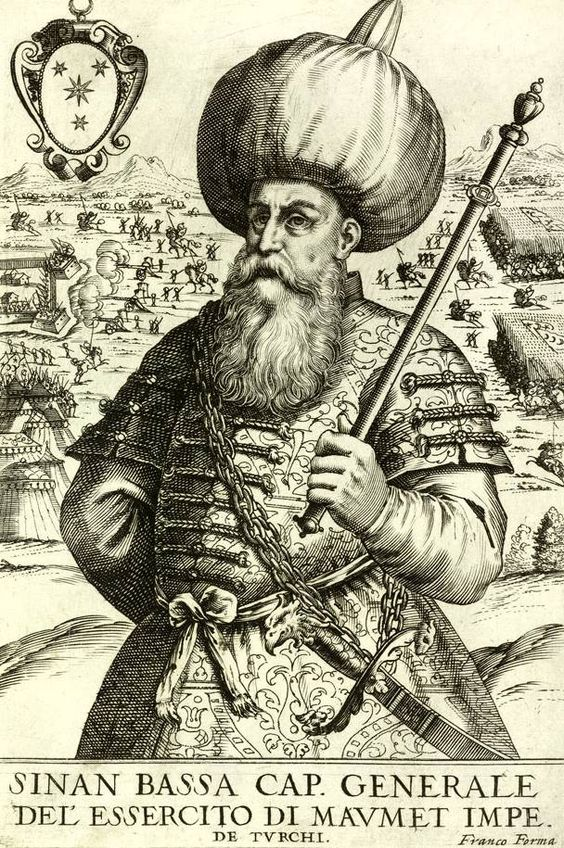
European rendering of Sinan Pasha, 1596

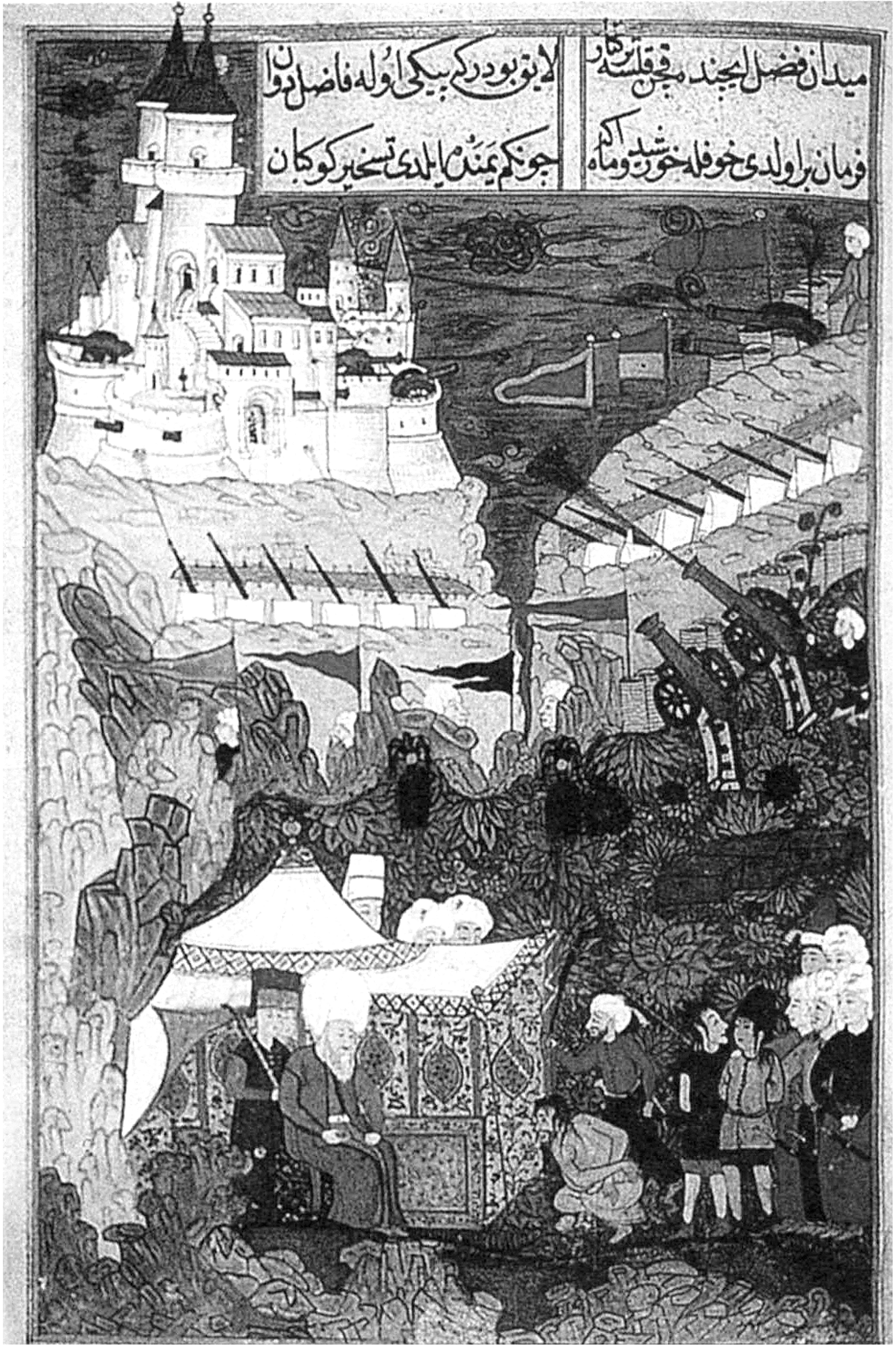
The siege of Kavkaban fortress by Sinan Pasha at Yemen. Diwan-i Nadiri, ca. 1605

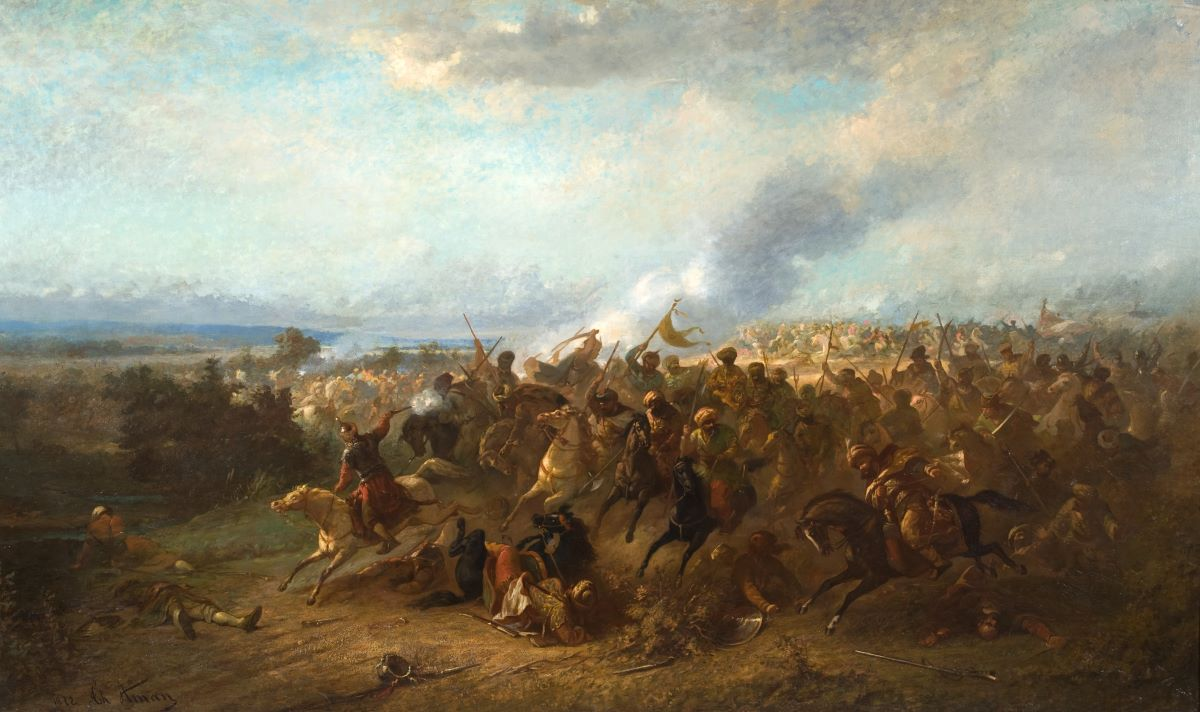
Sinan Pasha commanded the Ottoman Army in the Battle of Călugăreni (1595).

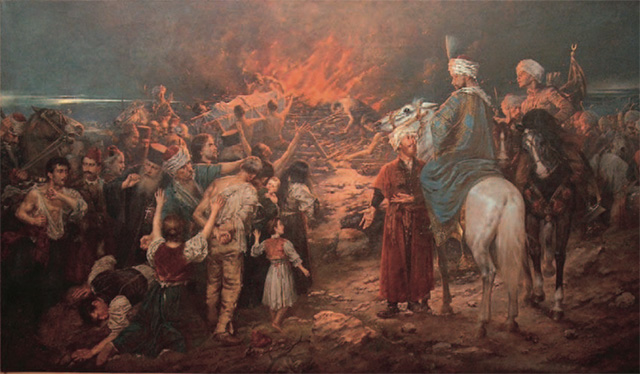
The burning of Saint Sava's relics by the Ottomans, painting by Stevan Aleksić (1912); Sinan Pasha ordered the relics to be burned

== See also ==
- Al-Tujjar Caravansarai (Mount Tabor)
- Sinan Pasha Mosque (Damascus)
- Sinan Pasha Mosque (Kačanik)
- List of Ottoman grand viziers
- List of Ottoman governors of Egypt

== Sources ==
- Elsie, Robert (2012). A Biographical Dictionary of Albanian History. I.B. Tauris. pp. 416–. ISBN 978-1780764313.
- Malcolm, Noel (2015). Agents of Empire: Knights, Corsairs, Jesuits and Spies in the Sixteenth-century Mediterranean World. Oxford University Press. pp. 264–268. ISBN 978-0190262785.

Political offices
Preceded by Mahmud Pasha	Ottoman Governor of Egypt; 1567–1569	Succeeded by Çerkes Iskender Pasha
Preceded by Çerkes Iskender Pasha	Ottoman Governor of Egypt; 1571–1573	Succeeded by Hüseyin Pasha Boljanić
Preceded by Lala Kara Mustafa Pasha	Grand Vizier of the Ottoman Empire; 7 August 1580 – 6 December 1582	Succeeded by Kanijeli Siyavuş Pasha
Preceded by Kanijeli Siyavuş Pasha	Grand Vizier of the Ottoman Empire; 14 April 1589 – 1 August 1591	Succeeded by Ferhad Pasha
Preceded by Kanijeli Siyavuş Pasha	Grand Vizier of the Ottoman Empire; 28 January 1593 – 16 February 1595	Succeeded by Ferhad Pasha
Preceded by Ferhad Pasha	Grand Vizier of the Ottoman Empire; 7 July 1595 – 19 November 1595	Succeeded by Lala Mehmed Pasha
Preceded by Lala Mehmed Pasha	Grand Vizier of the Ottoman Empire; 1 December 1595 – 3 April 1596	Succeeded by Damat Ibrahim Pasha
