= Zubaidah Begum =

Daughter of shah Abbas the Great of Persia

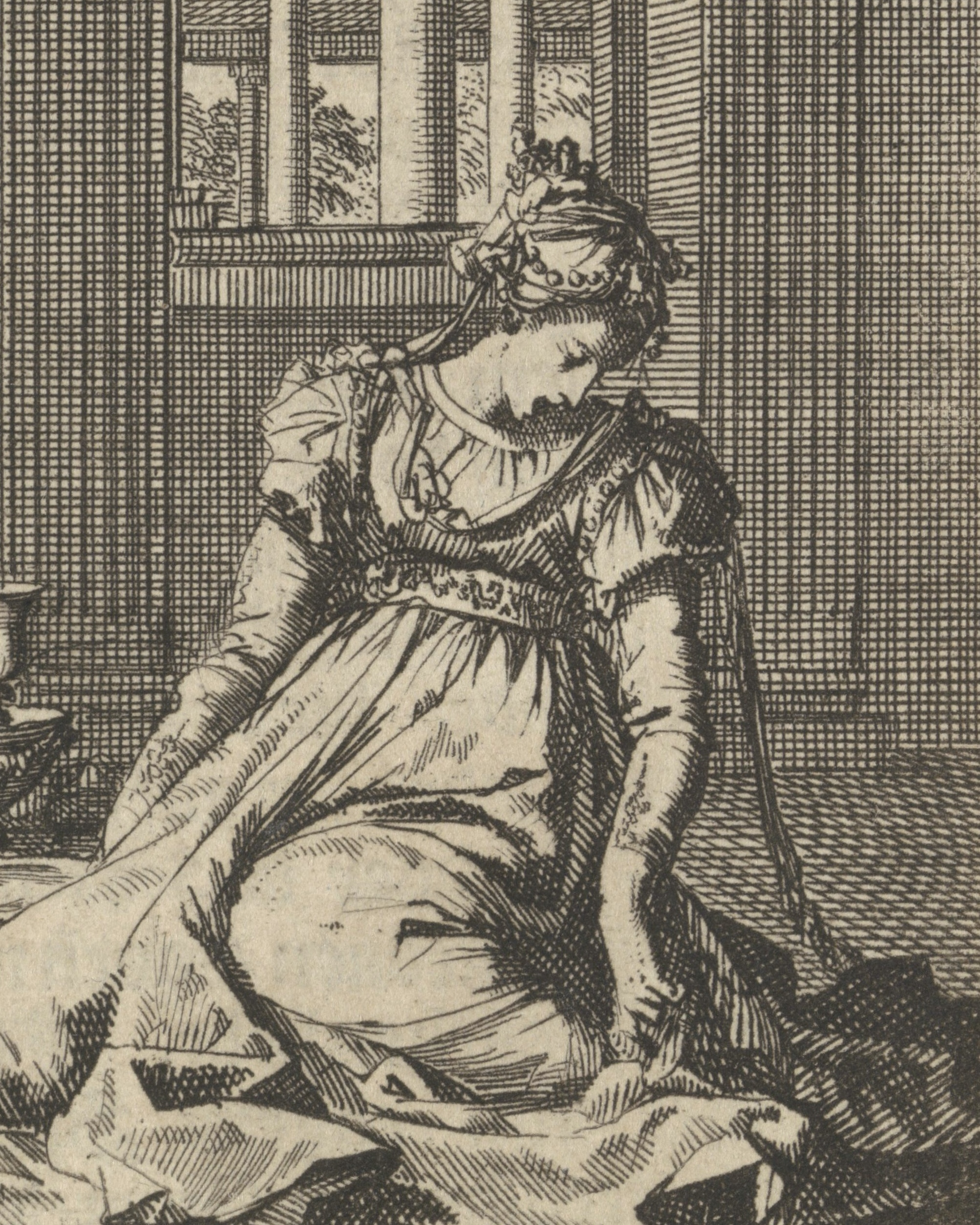
- Zubaidah Begum (detail) from Cruelty Shah Safi, by Jan Luyken, 1697
- Died: 20 February 1632
- Spouse: Isa Khan Sheykhavand
- Issue: Jahan Banu Begum
- Dynasty: Safavid
- Father: Abbas I
- Mother: Pahrijan-Begum

Zubaidah Begum (Persian: زبیده بیگم) (died 1632) was the daughter of shah Abbas the Great of Persia (r. 1588–1629). She was the aunt of shah Safi of Persia (r. 1629–1642), who took power following Shah Abbas' death.

== Biography ==
Her mother Pahrijan-Begum was born to Bagrat VII and his wife Ana of Kakheti. She played a political role in the power struggle that occurred upon Shah Safi's accession to the throne in 1629. This opposition is said to have resulted in the Shah Safi killing dozens of women of the harem called Bloody Ma'bas, and blinding or outright killing the sons who had been born to daughters of Shah Abbas. She was killed or died on 20 February 1632.

== Family ==
She married with Safavid prince and official Isa Khan and had an daughter named Jahan Banu Begum. She married with Simon II of Kartli in 1624.

== Sources ==
- Newman, Andrew J. (2008). Safavid Iran: Rebirth of a Persian Empire. I.B. Tauris. pp. 1–281. ISBN 9780857716613.
- Blow, David (2014-04-02). Shah Abbas: The Ruthless King Who Became an Iranian Legend. Bloomsbury Publishing. p. 229. ISBN 978-0-85771-676-7.
- Babayan, Kathryn (1993). The Waning of the Qizilbash: The Spiritual and the Temporal in Seventeenth Century Iran. Princeton University.
- Rayfield, Donald (2013). Edge of Empires: A History of Georgia. Reaktion Books. ISBN 9781780230306.
