= Abbas the Great =

Shah of Safavid Iran from 1587 to 1629

Abbas the Great شاه عباس بزرگ
- Šāhanšāh-e Īrān (King of Kings of Iran); Ẓellollāh (Shadow of God); Ṣāḥeb-e Qerān-e ʿAlāʾ (Supreme Lord of the Auspicious Conjunction); Moršed-e Kāmel (The Perfect Mentor)
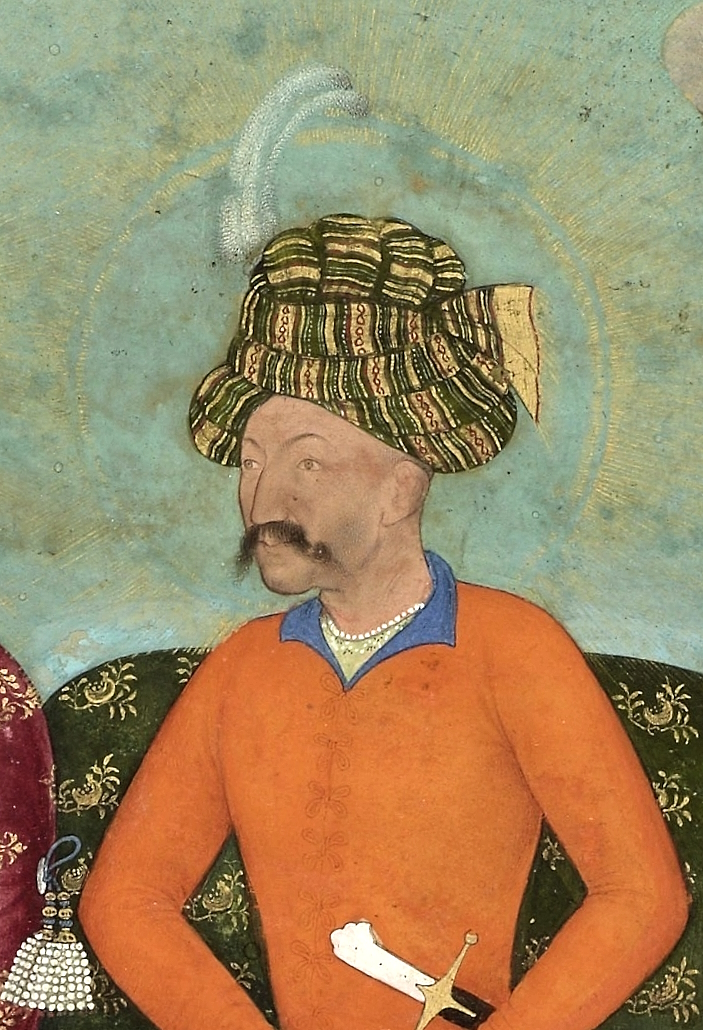
- Portrait by Bishandas, 1620

Shah of Iran
- Reign: 1 October 1587 – 20 January 1629
- Coronation: 1588
- Predecessor: Mohammad Khodabanda
- Successor: Safi
- Born: 27 January 1571; Herat, Safavid Iran (modern-day Afghanistan)
- Died: 19 January 1629 (aged 57); Farahabad, Safavid Iran
- Burial: Mausoleum of Shah Abbas I, Kashan
- Consort: Oghlan Pasha Khanum; Yakhan Begum; Fakhr Jahan Begum; Princess Marta; Fatima Sultan Begum; Tamar Amilakhori
- Issue: See below
Names
- English: Abbas the Great; Persian: عباس بزرگ
- Dynasty: Safavid
- Father: Mohammad Khodabanda
- Mother: Khayr al-Nisa Begum
- Religion: Twelver Shi'ism
- Military career
- Conflicts: Treelike list: Khorasan Wars; Ottoman–Safavid War (1578–1590); Persian–Uzbek wars; Uzbek invasion of Khorasan (1529); Battle of Herat (1598); Battle of Balkh (1602); Ottoman–Safavid war (1603–1612); Safavid capture of Tabriz (1603); Battle of Urmia (1604); Abbas I's Shirvan campaign; Siege of Dimdim; Battle of Sufiyan; Siege of Ganja (1606); Siege of Shamakhi; Abbas I's Kakhetian and Kartlian campaigns; Ottoman–Safavid War (1616–1618); Siege of Erivan (1616–1617); Battle of Tabriz (1618); Mughal–Persian wars; Siege of Kandahar (1605–1606); Mughal–Safavid war (1622–1623); Portuguese–Safavid wars; Safavid conquest of Bahrain; Capture of Cambarão; capture of Qeshm; capture of Hormuz; Ottoman–Safavid War (1623–1639); Capture of Baghdad (1624); Siege of Baghdad (1625–1626); Safavid invasions of Basra; Kartli-Kakhetian Uprising (1625); Battle of Martkopi; Battle of Marabda

Abbas I (Persian: عباس یکم, romanized: Abbâs-e Yekom; 27 January 1571 – 19 January 1629), commonly known as Abbas the Great (Persian: عباس بزرگ, romanized: Abbâs-e Bozorg), was the fifth Safavid shah of Iran from 1588 to 1629. The third son of Shah Mohammad Khodabanda, he is generally considered one of the most important rulers in Iranian history and the greatest ruler of the Safavid dynasty.

Although Abbas would reign over Safavid Iran at its military, political and economic height, he came to the throne during a period of instability in the empire. Under the ineffective rule of his father, the country was riven with discord between the different factions of the Qizilbash army, who killed Abbas' mother and elder brother. Meanwhile, Iran's main enemies, its archrival, the Ottoman Empire, and the Uzbeks, exploited this political chaos to seize territory for themselves. In 1588, one of the Qizilbash leaders, Murshid Quli Khan, overthrew Shah Mohammed in a coup and placed the 16-year-old Abbas on the throne. However, Abbas soon seized power for himself.

Under his leadership, Iran developed the gholam system where thousands of Circassian, Georgian, and Armenian slave-soldiers joined the civil administration and the military, thus creating a new strata in Iranian society, this was initiated by his predecessors but significantly expanded during his rule. This allowed Abbas to eclipse the power of the Qizilbash in the civil administration, the royal house, and the military. These actions, as well as his reforms of the Iranian army, enabled him to fight the Ottomans and Uzbeks and reconquer Iran's lost provinces, including Kakheti, whose people he subjected to widescale massacres and deportations. By the end of the 1603–1618 Ottoman War, Abbas had regained possession over South Caucasus and Dagestan, as well as swaths of Western Armenia and Mesopotamia. He also took back land from the Portuguese and the Mughals and expanded Iranian rule and influence in the North Caucasus, beyond the traditional territories of Dagestan.

Abbas was a great builder and moved the empire's capital from Qazvin to Isfahan, and transformed the city into a masterpiece of Safavid architecture. In his later years, following a court intrigue involving several leading Circassians, Abbas became suspicious of his own sons and had them killed or blinded.

Shah Abbas changed the empire, which was mainly held together by the strong beliefs of several militant tribes (Qizilbash), into a unified and stable monarchy. He strengthened the state by securing its borders, improving its economy, setting up a centralised administration, and creating a regular army (Shahsavan) that reported directly to him instead of tribal leaders. His keen economic and commercial understanding brought wealth and prosperity to the nation. Internal stability and consistent regulations encouraged agricultural growth. Infrastructure projects which included roads and public buildings, were carried out on an unprecedented scale, and enabled the flourishing of crafts and industries. As a skilled diplomat with a broad outlook, Shah Abbas sought political and economic ties with Western countries, and foreign ambassadors were warmly welcomed at his court.

== Early life ==
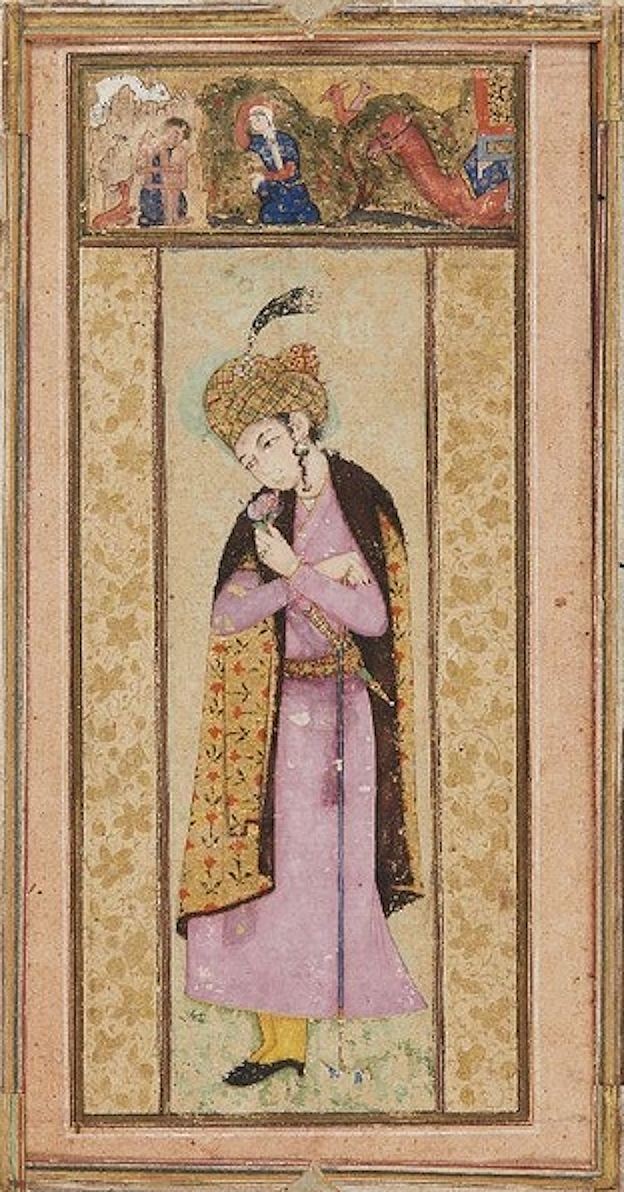
Portrait of Shah Abbas as a young man. Painted c. 1590.

Abbas I claimed a fictitious lineage going back to Fatima and Ali. (Note: "It is true that during their revolutionary phase (1447–1501), Safavi guides had played on their descent from the family of the Prophet. The hagiography of the founder of the Safavi order, Shaykh Safi al-Din Safvat al-Safa written by Ibn Bazzaz in 1350-was tampered with during this very phase. An initial stage of revisions saw the transformation of Safavi identity as Sunni Kurds into Arab blood descendants of Muhammad." Quoted from Babayan (2002), p. 143.) He was born on 27 January 1571, in Herat, and was the third son of Mohammad Khodabanda and his wife, Khayr al-Nisa Begum. His father was the first-born son of Tahmasp I, the second Shah of Safavid Iran. He chose the name Abbas for the infant. Abbas' father, Mohammad Khodabanda, was the governor of Herat, the capital city of the major province of Khorasan. Mohammad Khodanbanda was disqualified from succeeding his father because an eye disease had left him almost completely blind. The Safavid court chronicler, Iskandar Beg Monshi, describes Mohammad Khodabanda as ‘a pious, ascetic and gentle soul’. Abbas' mother, Khayr al-Nisa Begum, was the daughter of Mir Abdollah II, a local ruler in the province of Mazandaran from the Mar'ashi dynasty who claimed descent from the fourth Shi'ia imam, Ali ibn Husayn Zayn al-Abidin. She and Mohammad Khodabanda had already two children before Abbas, Hassan and Hamza, and she gave birth to two more sons later: Abu Taleb and Tahmasp.

When Abbas was barely eighteen months old, he was separated from his father and his mother, who were transferred by Tahmasp to govern the city of Shiraz. The nominal governorship of Herat was handed over to Abbas. At first, Tahmasp intended to make Hamza the governor of Herat, but Khayr al-Nisa Begum was unwilling to be separated from Hamza, who was her favourite son. So she persuaded the shah to appoint Abbas instead. The fact that Abbas was still a baby was not considered an obstacle, as Tahmasp himself had been appointed titular governor of Khorasan at the age of two.

Shah Qoli Sultan Ustajlu, an amir from one of the Qizilbash tribes called the Ustajlu tribe, was appointed as the actual governor and as Abbas's lala (guardian). Abbas's Qizilbash guardians and their wives became substitute parents for him. He never saw his mother again and only saw his father fifteen years later. Abbas learnt the necessary skills of a soldier from his Qizilbash guardians. He played polo and went frequently on hunts. Like most Iranian shahs, he developed a passion for hunting, which was regarded as a form of military training. Abbas was educated alongside household "slaves" (ghulams), who would have become his childhood companions. Some or perhaps most of them are likely to have been Georgians, Armenians or Circassians.

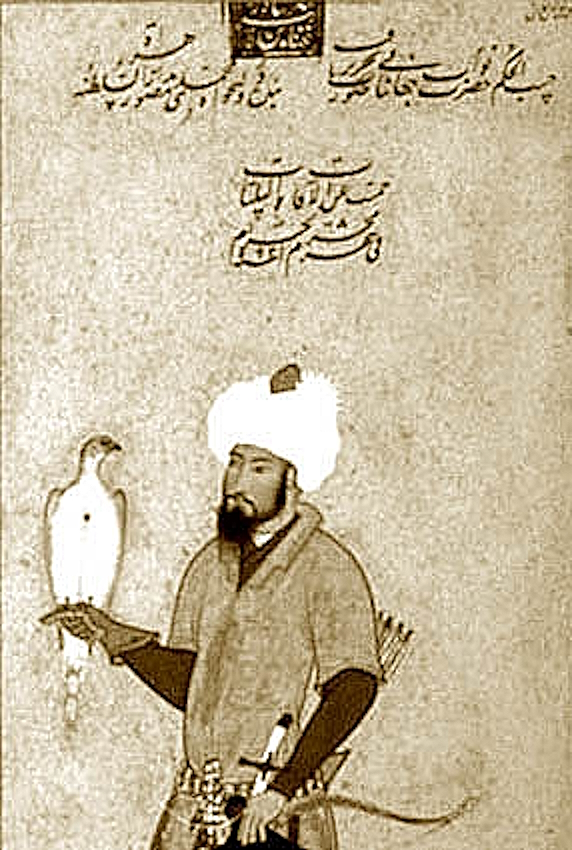
Portrait of Ali-Qoli Khan Shamlu, protector of the young Abbas. Painted in 1584.

On 14 May 1576, Tahmasp I died without a designated heir, which led to the realm descending into civil war. The following day, Tahmasp I's favourite son, Haydar Mirza, proclaimed himself shah with the support of the Ustajlu tribe and the powerful court Georgians. However, he was immediately overthrown and killed by the qurchis (the royal bodyguards). After his death, with the support of the majority of the Qizilbash tribes and the endorsement of Tahmasp's influential daughter, Pari Khan Khanum, Ismail Mirza, who had been imprisoned by his father for twenty years, was crowned king as Ismail II. The new shah's reign turned out to be short and murderous. The long years of imprisonment had left him suffering from paranoia, with the result that he saw enemies everywhere who had to be eliminated. First and foremost, he began murdering most of the members of Ustajlu tribe regardless of whether or not they had supported Haydar Mirza. He also executed people whose only crime was having held a position during Tahmasp's reign. The young Abbas was directly affected by his uncle's purge when a group of horsemen rushed into his guardian's house, Shah Qoli Sultan, and killed him.

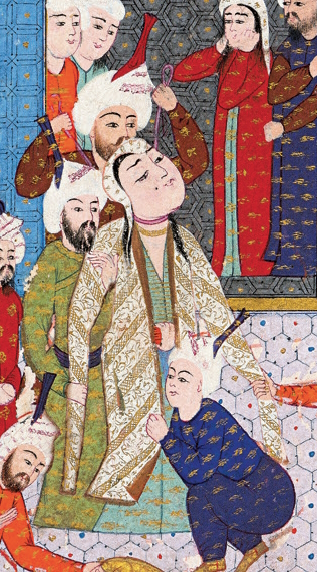
The strangulation of Safavid queen Khayr al-Nisa Begum, mother of Abbas, by the Qizilbash on 26 July 1579. Nusretname (1584).

Ismail then turned on his family. He ordered the execution of many of his half-brothers, cousins and nephews. He spared Mohammad Khodabanda, possibly because they were full-brothers and perhaps because Mohammad Khodabanda was already blind and disqualified as a possible claimant to the throne. In November 1577, however, Ismail dispatched Ali-Qoli Khan from the Shamlu tribe to Herat to kill the young Abbas. Ali-Qoli delayed Abbas' execution, giving as a reason that it would be "inappropriate" to execute an "innocent" descendant of a seyed on holy days (Qadr Night and Eid al-Fitr). This delay saved Abbas' life, for on 24 November 1577, Ismail II died from consuming poisoned opium, and Ali-Qoli Khan assumed the governorship of Herat and the role of guardian of Abbas.

On 11 or 13 February 1578, Mohammad Khodabanda was chosen by the Qizilbash as the new shah. The new shah appeared weak, indifferent and incompetent. In these circumstances power soon passed into other hands. Abbas' mother, Khayr al-Nisa Begum, was a strong-willed woman. She took complete charge of the administration and made all the decisions, even in military matters. The Qizilbash were not happy to see her taking power. The divisions in the Safavid court encouraged rebellions in various parts of the country and the old Qizilbash rivalries rose again, with the Ustajlu and Shamlu tribes immediately confronting each other. Mohammad Khodabanda and the queen asked Ali-Qoli Khan to bring Abbas to Qazvin, fearing that Ali-Qoli Khan was conspiring to enthrone Abbas, but the Qizilbash amirs of Khorasan argued that with the threat of the Uzbeks of Bukhara raiding near Herat, the presence of a prince in the city was necessary.

The weak state of the realm led to the Ottoman Empire declaring war against Iran in 1578. The Safavid armies suffered several defeats before Khayr al-Nisa Begum organised a counter-offensive. Together with her son, Hamza Mirza and the grand vizier, Mirza Salman Jaberi, she led an army north to confront the Ottoman and Tatar forces in Shirvan. But her attempt to dictate the campaign strategy angered the Qizilbash amirs. Eventually, on 26 July 1579, the Qizilbash stormed into the harem where the queen resided and strangled Khayr al-Nisa Begum. Although Abbas was still only a boy and barely knew his mother, her murder at the hands of the Qizilbash made a deep impression on him. That experience probably led to his belief that the power of the Qizilbash had to be broken.

== Ascension ==
After the queen's death, Hamza Mirza, aged eleven, was proclaimed crown prince. The Qizilbash found no reason to fear a child. So they took control over the realm while fighting among themselves over the division of power. The conflict was most intense at the court in Qazvin and in Khorasan, where Ali-Qoli Khan Shamlu, and his principal ally, Murshid Qoli Khan Ustajlu, had for some time been at war with the Turkman governor of Mashhad, Morteza Quli Khan Pornak. The Takkalu tribe eventually seized the power in Qazvin and proceeded to purge a number of prominent Shamlu members, among them being the mother and father of Ali-Qoli Khan. This angered Ali-Qoli Khan and, just as the queen had predicted, in 1581, he took arms against the crown and made his ward, the ten-year-old Abbas, the figurehead of a rebellion in Khorasan by proclaiming him Shah of Iran. Ali-Qoli and Murshid Qoli Khan took control of Nishapur; there, they struck coins and read khutba in Abbas' name.

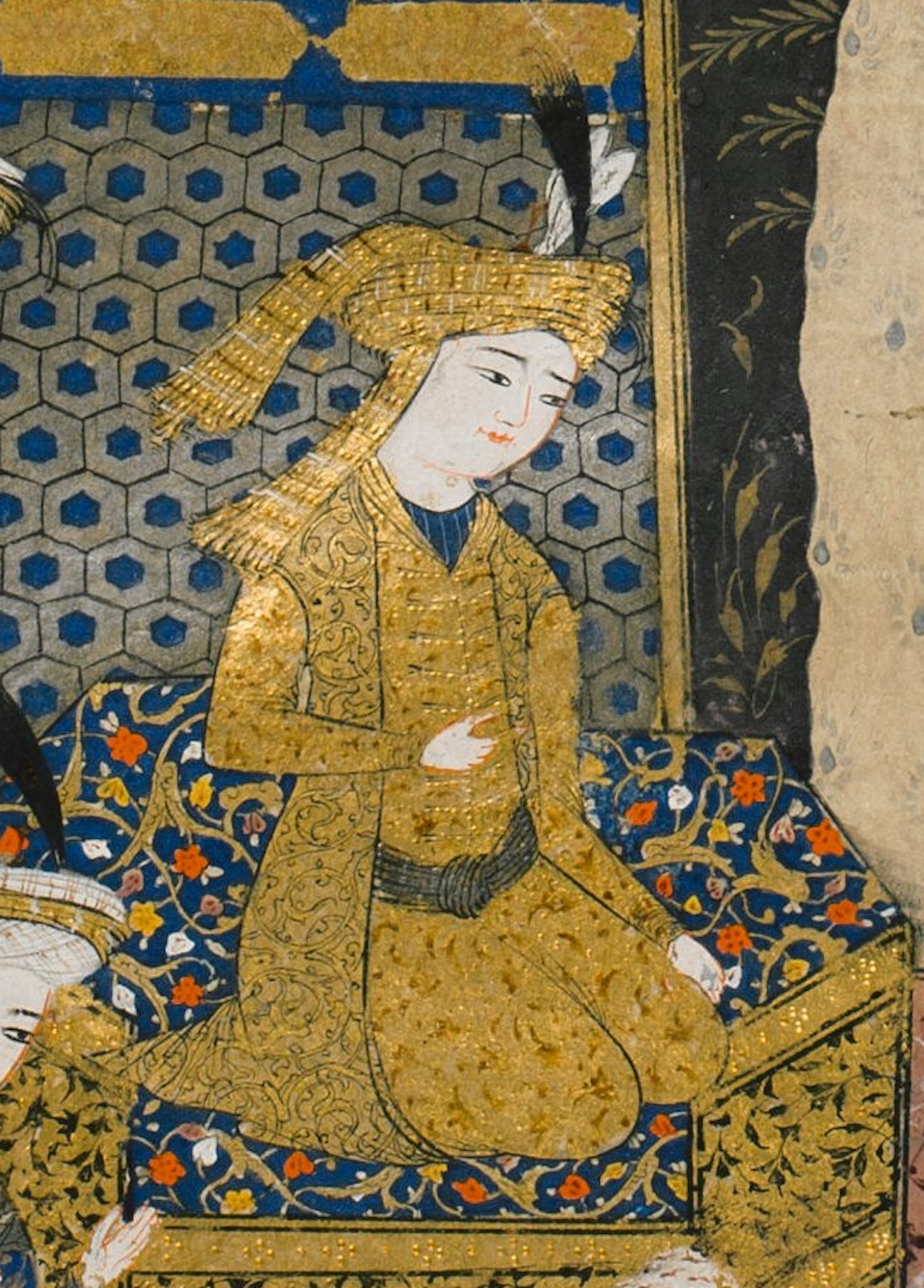
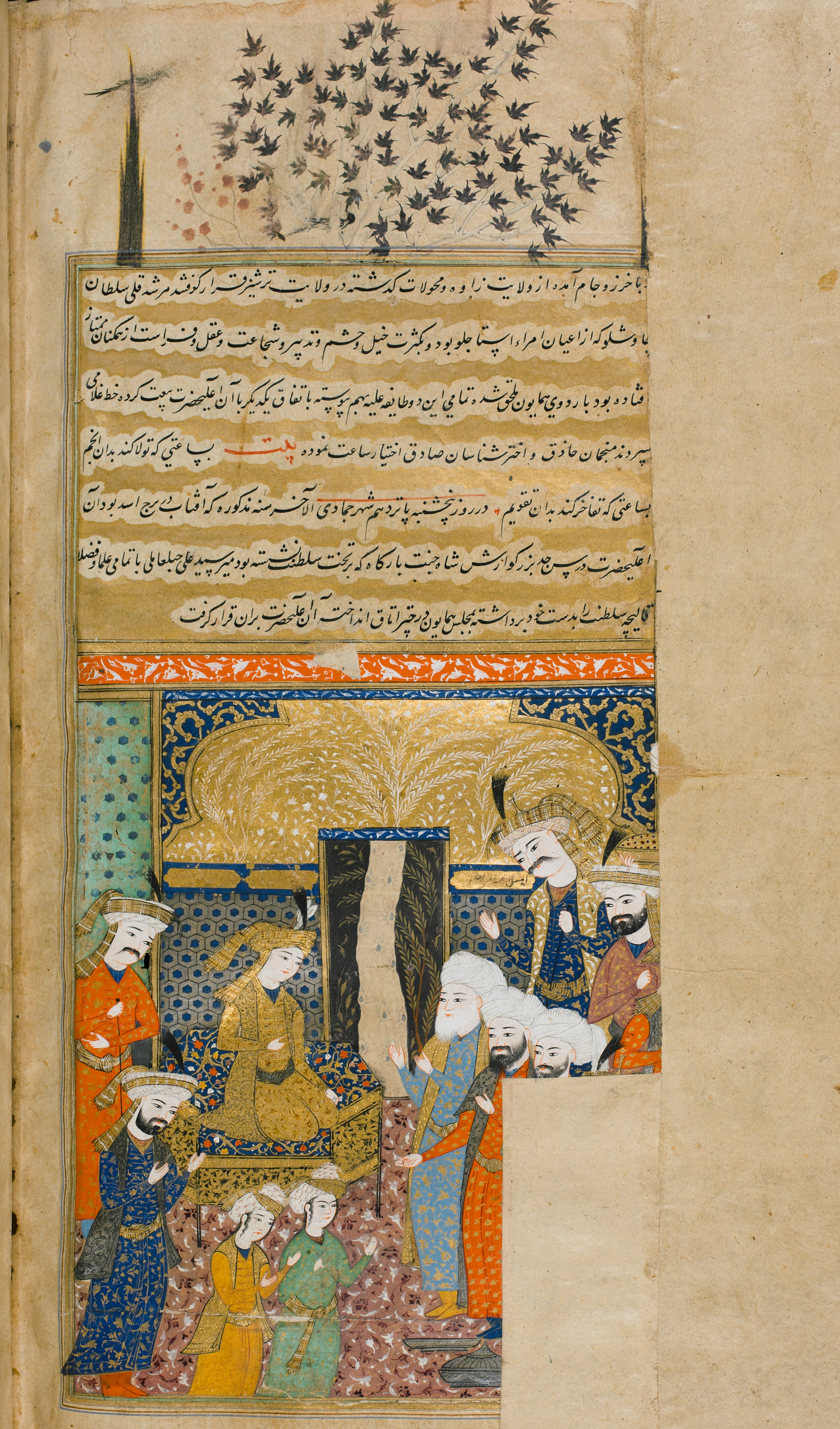
Prince ʽAbbās enthroned, proclaimed Shah in Khorasan in 1581. Page from Ahmad Monshi Ghomi's Kholāsat al-tavārikh (c.1630–50).

In the following year, an army from western Iran advanced into Khorasan to resolve the situation. This army laid siege to Torbat-e Heydarieh, where Murshid Qoli was in control, and on Herat, where both Ali-Qoli Khan and Abbas resided. Both attempts proved futile. Upon hearing the news of another Ottoman attack on northwest Iran, the leading ministers of the campaign hurriedly reached an agreement with Ali-Qoli Khan. The former rebel suffered no repercussions and only had to pledge loyalty to Hamza Mirza as the heir apparent. He remained as the governor and as Abbas' guardian and even received a reward from the shah. Mohammad Khodabanda removed Ali-Qoli Khan's old enemy, Morteza Quli Khan Pornak, from his position as governor of Mashhad and replaced him with an Ustajlu amir. According to Iskandar Beg Monshi, many came to believe Abbas Mirza's claim would eventually prevail over Hamza Mirza's.

Meanwhile, Hamza Mirza was preoccupied with pushing the Ottomans out of Tabriz. However, he became caught up in the rivalries between the Qizilbash tribes and angered his officers by executing the Qizilbash governor of Azarbaijan. On 5 December 1586, he was assassinated by his personal barber, who might have been bribed by a group of Qizilbash conspirators. This assassination provided a pathway for Abbas' ascension.

In the meantime, in Khorasan, Murshid Qoli Khan emerged as a rival to Ali-Qoli. He successfully seized Mashhad and abducted Abbas from Ali-Qoli's possession. An Uzbek invasion advanced through Khorasan and laid siege to Herat. This threatened Murshid Qoli's position who realised it was his last chance to enthrone Abbas. Many of the Qizilbash amirs gave their assurance of their support for placing Abbas on the throne. After learning that Mohammad Khodabanda had left Qazvin to confront rebels in the south, Murshid Qoli Khan decided to strike.

During the first ten days of Ramadan 1586, Abbas, his guardian and a small escort of not more than a few hundred horsemen, decided to ride towards Qazvin. As they rode along the Silk Road, Qizilbash amirs from the powerful Takkalu, Afshar and Zul al-Qadr tribes, who controlled many of the key towns on the way, came to pledge their allegiance. By the time they approached Qazvin, their small force had increased to 2,000 armed horsemen. The lord mayor of Qazvin and the Qizilbash amirs inside the city at first urged resistance. But they gave up when crowds of citizens and soldiers, anxious to avoid fighting, came out onto the streets and voiced their support for Abbas, who rode into the capital beside Murshid Qoli Khan in late-September 1587.

Mohammad Khodabanda and his heir apparent, Abu Taleb Mirza, and their entourage of Ustajlu and Shamlu amirs, were camped 200 miles away in the city of Qom. When the news reached them, the amirs decided to abandon the shah and his heir for Abbas Mirza. Mohammad Khodabanda decide that he had no choice but to abdicate. On 1 October 1587, at a ceremony in the palace in Qazvin, he placed his crown on the head of his seventeen-year-old son, who ascended the throne as Abbas I. Murshid Qoli Khan, to whom Abbas owed the crown, was rewarded with the title of vakil (viceroy).

== Rule as shah ==
=== Abbas takes control ===
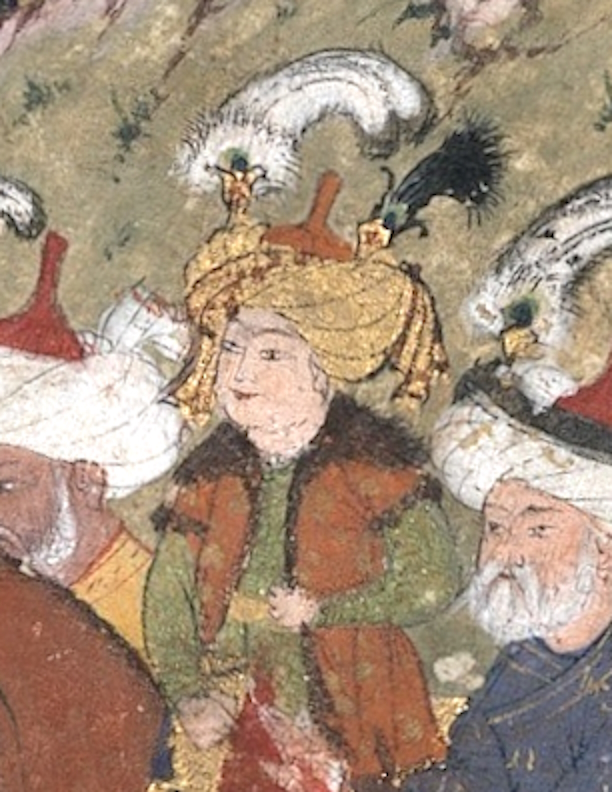
Shah Abbas had to give his young nephew Haydar Mirza as a hostage to the Ottoman court, in order to seal the Peace Treaty of Constantinople in 1590.

The empire Abbas inherited was in a desperate state. The Ottomans had seized vast territories in the west and the north-west (including the major city of Tabriz) and the Uzbeks had overrun half of Khorasan in the north-east. Iran itself was riven by fighting between the various factions of the Qizilbash, who had mocked royal authority by killing the queen in 1579 and the grand vizier Mirza Salman Jaberi in 1583.

Firstly, Abbas settled his score with his mother's killers, executing three of the ringleaders of the plot and exiling four others. His next task was to free himself from the power of Murshid Qoli Khan. Murshid made Abbas marry Hamza's widow and a Safavid cousin, and began distributing important government posts among his own friends, gradually confining Abbas to the palace. Meanwhile, the Uzbeks continued their conquest of Khorasan. When Abbas heard they were besieging his old friend Ali Qoli Khan Shamlu in Herat, he pleaded with Murshid to take action. Fearing a rival, Murshid did nothing until the news came that Herat had fallen and the Uzbeks had slaughtered the entire population. Only then did he set out on campaign to Khorasan. But Abbas planned to avenge the death of Ali Qoli Khan, and he arranged for four Qizilbash leaders to kill Murshid after a banquet on 23 July 1589. With Murshid gone, Abbas could now rule Iran in his own right.

Abbas decided he must re-establish order within Iran before he took on the foreign invaders. To this end he made a humiliating peace treaty, known as the Treaty of Constantinople, with the Ottomans in 1590, ceding to them the provinces of Azerbaijan, Karabagh, Shirvan, and Dagestan, as well as parts of Georgia, Lorestan and Kurdistan. This demeaning treaty even ceded the previous capital of Tabriz to the Ottomans. Finally, Shah Abbas had to give as hostage to the Ottomans one of the possible successors to the Safavid throne: his nephew the young Haydar Mirza was sent to Constantinople in 1590, where he would die in 1596.

=== Reducing the Qizilbash's power and Caucasus invasions ===
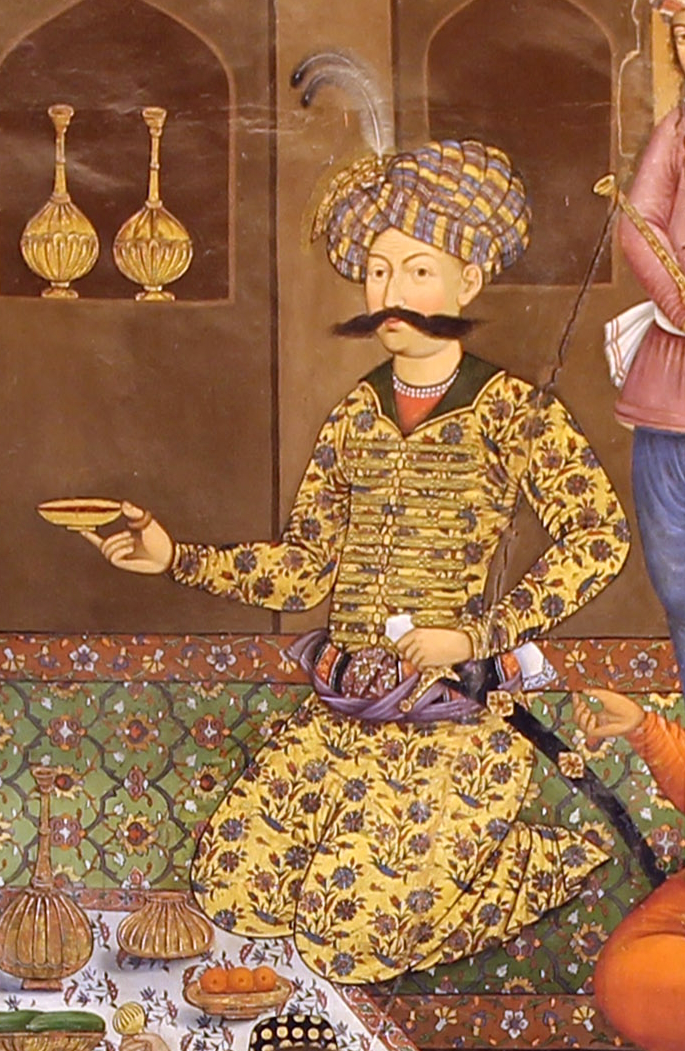
Near-contemporary portrait of Shah Abbas I, from the Palace of Chehel Sotoun, Isfahan. Commissioned by his grandson Abbas II, circa 1647–50.

The Qizilbash had provided the backbone of the Safavid army from the very beginning of Safavid rule and they also occupied many posts in the government. As a result, effective power in the state in the early days of the dynasty was held by the Qizilbash, leaving the shah often powerless. To counterbalance their power and as a decisive answer to this problem, Abbas turned to the newly introduced members of Iranian society (an initiative put in place by Shah Tahmasp I) the ghulams (a word literally meaning "slaves"). From these newly introduced slaves, the Shah created a military force of up to 37,000 soldiers, completely funded by the Crown. This weakened the power that the Qizilbash had against the crown significantly as they no longer had a "military monopoly" in Iran. Like the janissaries of the neighbouring Ottoman Empire, the ghulams were mainly Georgians, Circassians and Armenians who had been brought into Iran en masse (by conquest and slave trade), had converted or had been converted to Islam, and had taken up service in the army, royal household or the civil administration, and were loyal only to the shah. Under Abbas' leadership this new grouping in Iranian society (also called the third force) grew in influence and power, with many thousands of ethnic Georgians, Circassians and Armenians becoming an integral part of Iranian society and taking up key government, royal household and military positions.

Tahmasp I, the second Safavid shah, had realised, by looking at his own empire and that of the neighbouring Ottomans, that he faced ongoing threats from dangerous rival factions and internal family rivalries that were a threat to him as the head of state. If not properly managed, these rivalries represented a serious threat to the ruler or could lead to unnecessary court intrigues. For Tahmasp, the problem revolved around the military tribal elite of the empire, the Qizilbash, who believed that physical proximity to and control of a member of the immediate Safavid family guaranteed spiritual advantages, political fortune and material advancement.

Therefore, between 1540 and 1555, Tahmasp conducted a series of invasions of the Caucasus region which provided battle experience for his soldiers, as well as leading to the capture of large numbers of Christian Circassian and Georgian slaves (30,000 in just four raids). These slaves would form the basis of a Safavid military slave system. These slaves would serve a similar role in their formation, implementation and use to the janissaries of the neighbouring Ottoman Empire. Their arrival in such large numbers led to the formation of a new grouping in Iranian society solely composed of ethnic Caucasians. Although the first slave soldiers would not be organised until Abbas' reign, during Tahmasp's time Caucasians would already become important members of the royal household, the harem and in the civil and military administration.

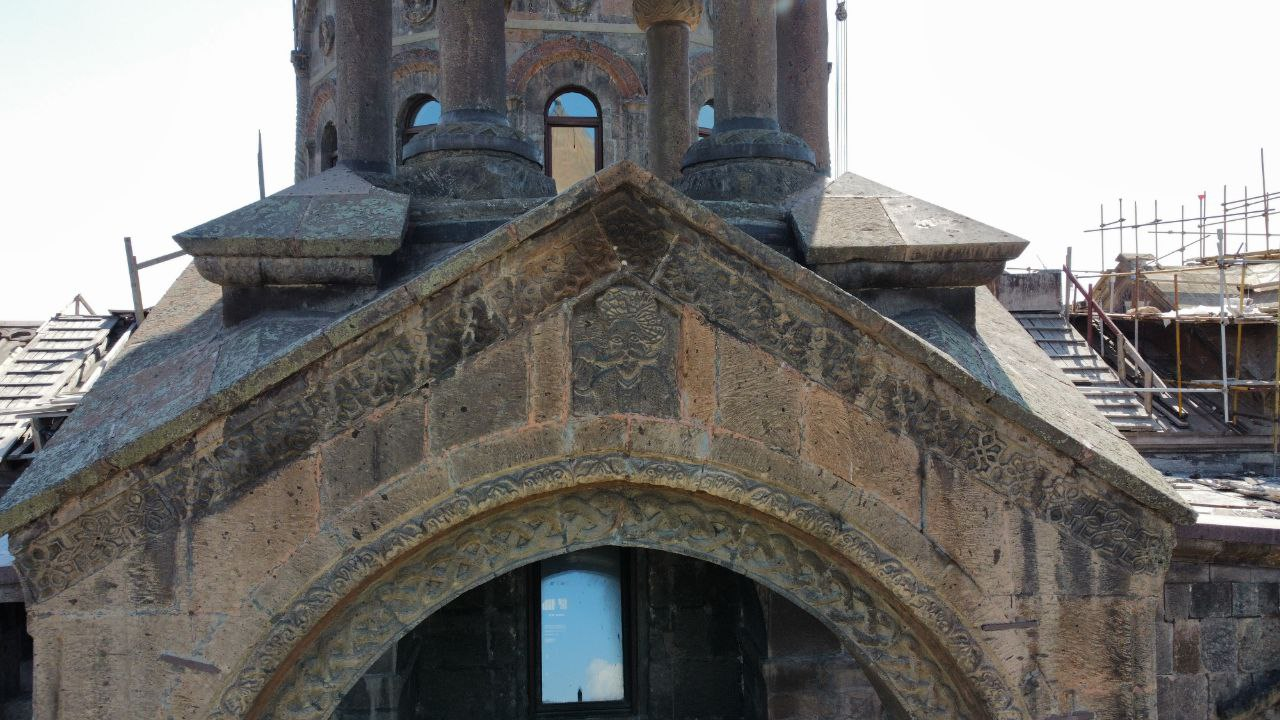
Portrait of Abbas the Great on Etchmiadzin Cathedral, Vagharshapat, Armenia

Learning from his grandfather, Abbas (who had been used by the vying Qizilbash factions during his youth) decided to encourage this new (Caucasian) grouping in Iranian society, as he realised that he must impose his authority on the Qezelbāš or remain their puppet. So Abbas single-handedly encouraged the growth in influence and power of this new grouping, also called the third force. It is estimated that during Abbas' reign alone some 130,000 to 200,000 Georgians, tens of thousands of Circassians, and around 300,000 Armenians were deported from the Caucasus to Persia's heartland, with a significant number gaining responsibilities and roles in Iranian society, including some of the highest positions of the state, including the ghulam corps. Many of those deported from the Caucasus settled in various regions of Iran and became craftsmen, farmers, cattle breeders, traders, soldiers, generals, governors and peasants within Iranian society. As part of the ghulam slave system, Abbas greatly expanded the ghulam military corps (also known as ḡolāmān-e ḵāṣṣa-ye-e šarifa, "crown servants") from just a few hundred during Tahmasp's era, to 15,000 highly trained cavalrymen, as part of a whole army division of 40,000 Caucasian ghulams. Abbas then reduced the number of Qizilbash provincial governorships and systematically moved Qizilbash governors to other districts, thus disrupting their ties with the local community and reducing their power. Most were eventually replaced by ghulams, whose loyalty was to the shah.

By 1595, Allahverdi Khan, a Georgian, had become one of the most powerful men in the Safavid state when he was appointed the Governor-General of Fars, one of the richest provinces in Persia. His power reached its peak in 1598, when he became the commander-in-chief of all the armed forces. Not only did the ghulam system allow the shah to control and manage the rival Qizilbash Turks and Persians, it also resolved budgetary problems, in the short term at least, for by restoring the Shah's complete control of the provinces formerly governed by the Qizilbash chiefs, the provinces' revenues now supplemented the royal treasury. From now on, government officials collected the taxes and remitted them directly to the royal treasury. In the harem, the Circassians and Georgians rapidly replaced the Turcoman factions gaining, as a result, a significant direct influence on the meritocratic Safavid bureaucracy and the court of the Safavid state.

The Georgians and Circassians struggle against the Qizilbash for power and influence, with the related court intrigues, saw queens (and their supporters in the harem, court and bureaucracy) compete against each other in order to get their own sons on the throne. This competition increased under Abbas and his successors which weakened the dynasty considerably. Abbas' own son, Crown Prince Mohammad Baqer Mirza, was caught in a court intrigue involving several leading Circassians, which eventually led to his execution under Abbas' orders.

Though the ghulam system did not work as well as it had after the Safavids, the third force would continue to play a crucial role during the rest of the Safavid era and later until the end of the Qajar era.

=== Reforming the army ===
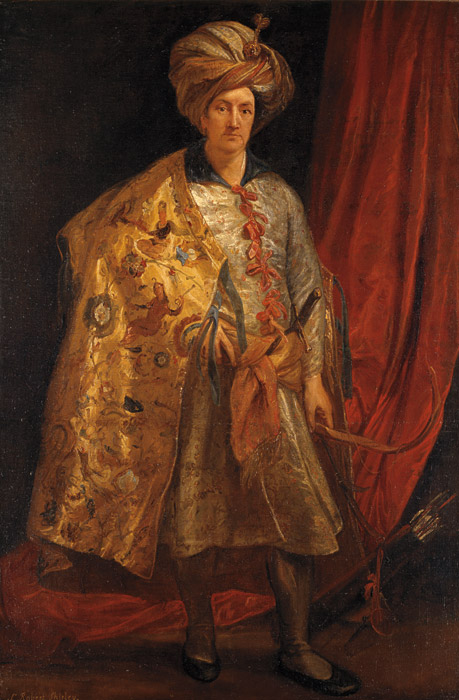
Anthony Shirley and Robert Shirley (pictured in 1622) helped modernise the Persian Army.

Abbas needed ten years to get his army into shape so that he could effectively confront his Ottoman and Uzbek enemies. During this period, the Uzbeks and the Ottomans took swaths of territory from Iran. He also used military reorganisation as another way of side-lining the Qizilbash. He created a standing army of many thousands of ghulams (always conscripted from ethnic Georgians and Circassians), and to a much lesser extent Iranians, to fight alongside the traditional, feudal force provided by the Qizilbash. The new army regiments' loyalty was to the Shah. The new army consisted of 10,000 to 15,000 cavalry or squires (conscripted Caucasian ghulams) armed with muskets and other weapons (then the largest cavalry in the world), a corps of musketeers, or tufangchiyan, (12,000 strong) and a corp of artillery, called tupchiyan (also 12,000 strong). In addition Abbas had a personal bodyguard, composed of Caucasian ghulams, that was increased to 3,000. This force amounted to about 40,000 soldiers paid for and beholden to the Shah.

Abbas greatly increased the number of cannon at his disposal so that he could field 500 cannon in a single battle. Ruthless discipline was enforced and looting was severely punished. Abbas was also able to draw on military advice from a number of European envoys, particularly the English adventurers Sir Anthony Shirley and his brother Robert Shirley, who arrived in 1598 as envoys from the Earl of Essex on an unofficial mission to persuade Persia to enter into an anti-Ottoman alliance.

From 1600 onwards, the Safavid statesman Allāhverdī Khan, in conjunction with Robert Shirley, undertook further reorganisations of the army, which led to a further increase in the number of ghulams to 25,000.

=== Consolidation of the Empire ===
During the 1590s, Abbas moved to depose the provincial rulers of Persia. He started with Khan Ahmad Khan, the ruler of Gilan, who had disobeyed Abbas' orders when he requested that Khan Ahmad Khan's daughter Yakhan Begum marry Abbas' son, Mohammad Baqer Mirza, since Khan Ahmad Khan had no male successor. Khan Ahmad Khan disagreed due to the age of his daughter. This resulted in a Safavid invasion of Gilan in 1591 under the leadership of one of Abbas' favourites, Farhad Khan Qaramanlu. In 1593–94, Jahangir III, the Paduspanid ruler of Nur, travelled to the court of the Abbas, where he handed over his domains to him, and spend the rest of his life on an estate at Saveh, which Abbas had given to him. In 1597, Abbas deposed the Khorshidi ruler of Luristan. One year later, Jahangir IV, the Paduspanid ruler of Kojur, killed two prominent Safavid nobles during a festival in Qazvin. In response, in 1598 Abbas invaded his domains and besieged Kojur. Jahangir managed to flee, but was captured and killed by a pro-Safavid Paduspanid named Hasan Lavasani.

== Reconquest ==
=== War against the Khanate of Bukhara ===
Abbas' first campaign with his reformed army was against the Uzbeks who had seized Khorasan and were ravaging the province. In April 1598 he went on the attack. One of the two main cities of the province, Mashhad, was easily recaptured but the Uzbek leader Din Mohammed Khan was safely behind the walls of the other chief city, Herat. Abbas managed to lure the Uzbek army out of the town by feigning a retreat. A bloody battle ensued on 9 August 1598, in the course of which the Uzbek khan was wounded and his troops retreated (the khan was murdered by his own men during the retreat). However, during the battle, Farhad Khan had fled after being wounded and was later accused of fleeing due to cowardice. He was nevertheless forgiven by Abbas, who wanted to appoint him as the governor of Herat, which Farhad Khan refused. According to Oruch Beg, Farhad Khan's refusal made Abbas feel that he had been insulted. Due to Farhad Khan's arrogant behaviour and his suspected treason, he was seen as a threat to Abbas, so Abbas had him executed. Abbas then converted Gilan and Mazandaran into the crown domain (khasseh), and appointed Allahverdi Khan as the new commander-in-chief of the Safavid army.

By 1599, Abbas had captured not only Herat and Mashhad, but had moved as far east as Balkh. This was a short-lived victory and he could only settle on controlling only some of this conquest, because the new ruler of the Transoxiana, Baqi Muhammad Khan returned Balkh to Uzbek domain after defeating Safavid army led by Abbas near Balkh in 1602. By 1603, the battle lines had stabilized despite the loss of the majority of the Safavid artillery to Uzbeks. Abbas was able to hold onto most of Khorasan, including Herat, Sabzevar, Farah, and Nisa.

Abbas' north-east frontier was now safe for the time being and he could turn his attention to the Ottomans in the west. After defeating the Uzbeks, he moved his capital from Qazvin to Isfahan.

=== War against the Ottomans ===
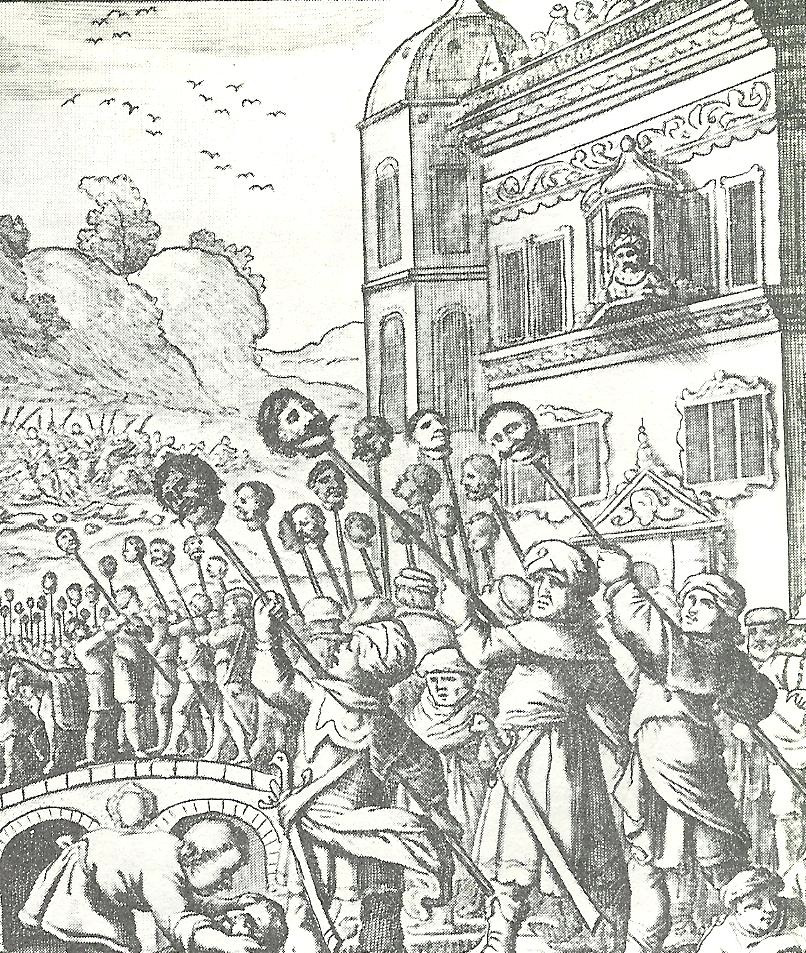
Drawing of the capture of Tabriz and the parading before Shah Abbas I of the severed heads of Ottoman soldiers. Drawn by a European traveller, 1603.

The Safavids had not yet beaten their archrival, the Ottomans, in battle. After a particularly arrogant series of demands from the Ottoman ambassador, the Shah had him seized, had his beard shaved and sent it to his master, the sultan, in Constantinople. This was effectively a declaration of war. In the resulting conflict, Abbas first recaptured Nahavand and destroyed the fortress in the city, which the Ottomans had planned to use as an advance base for attacks on Iran. The next year, Abbas pretended he was setting off on a hunting expedition to Mazandaran with his men. This was merely a ruse to deceive the Ottoman spies in his court – his real target was Azerbaijan. He changed course for Qazvin where he assembled a large army and set off to retake Tabriz, which had been in Ottoman hands for some time.

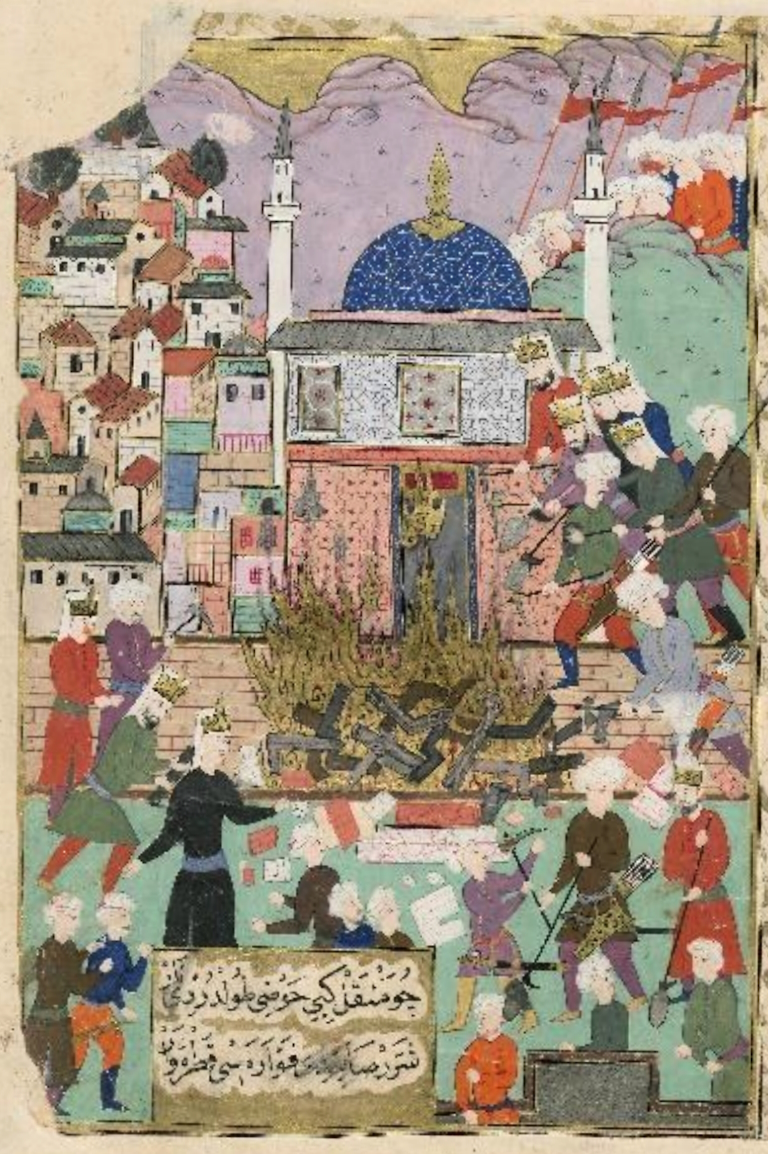
Tabriz is plundered by the Ottoman army of the Grand Vizier Damat Halil Pasha in 1618, during the Ottoman–Safavid War (1616–1618). Şehname-i Nadiri.

For the first time, the Iranians made great use of their artillery and the town – which had been ruined by Ottoman occupation – soon fell. Abbas set off to besiege Yerevan, a town that had become one of the main Ottoman strongholds in the Caucasus since the Safavids had ceded it in 1590. It finally fell in June 1604 and with it the Ottomans lost the support of most Armenians, Georgians and other Caucasians. But Abbas was unsure how the new Sultan Ahmed I, would respond and withdrew from the region using scorched earth tactics. For a year, neither side made a move, but in 1605, Abbas sent his general Allahverdi Khan to meet Ottoman forces on the shores of Lake Van. On 6 November 1605 the Iranians, led by Abbas, scored a decisive victory over the Ottomans at Sufiyan, near Tabriz. In the Caucasus, during the war Abbas also managed to capture what is now Kabardino-Balkaria. The Persian victory was recognised in the Treaty of Nasuh Pasha in 1612, effectively granting them back suzerainty over most of the Caucasus.

Several years of peace followed as the Ottomans carefully planned their response. But their secret training manoeuvres were observed by Iranian spies. Abbas learnt that the Ottoman plan was to invade Iran via Azerbaijan, take Tabriz then move on to Ardabil and Qazvin, which they could use as bargaining chips in exchange for other territories. The shah decided to lay a trap. He would allow the Ottomans to enter the country, then destroy them. He had Tabriz evacuated of its inhabitants while he waited at Ardabil with his army. In 1618, an Ottoman army of 100,000 led by the Grand Vizier Damat Halil Pasha invaded and easily seized Tabriz. The vizier sent an ambassador to the shah demanding he make peace and return the lands taken since 1602. Abbas refused and pretended he was ready to set fire to Ardabil and retreat further inland rather than face the Ottoman army. When Halil Pasha heard the news, he decided to march on Ardabil right away. This was just what Abbas wanted. His army of 40,000 was hiding at a crossroads on the way and they ambushed the Ottoman army in a battle, which ended in complete victory for the Iranians.

In 1623, Abbas decided to take back Mesopotamia, which had been lost by his grandfather Tahmasp through the Ottoman–Safavid War (1532–1555). Profiting from the confusion surrounding the accession of the new Ottoman Sultan Murad IV, he pretended to be making a pilgrimage to the Shi'ite shrines of Karbala and Najaf, but used his army to seize Baghdad. However, Abbas was then distracted by a rebellion in Georgia in 1624 led by Giorgi Saakadze thus allowing an Ottoman force to besiege Baghdad, but the Shah came to its relief the next year and defeated the Turkish army decisively. In 1638, however, after Abbas' death, the Ottomans retook Baghdad, and the Iranian–Ottoman border was finalised to be roughly the same as the current Iran–Turkey and Iran–Iraq borders.

=== Quelling the Georgian uprisings ===
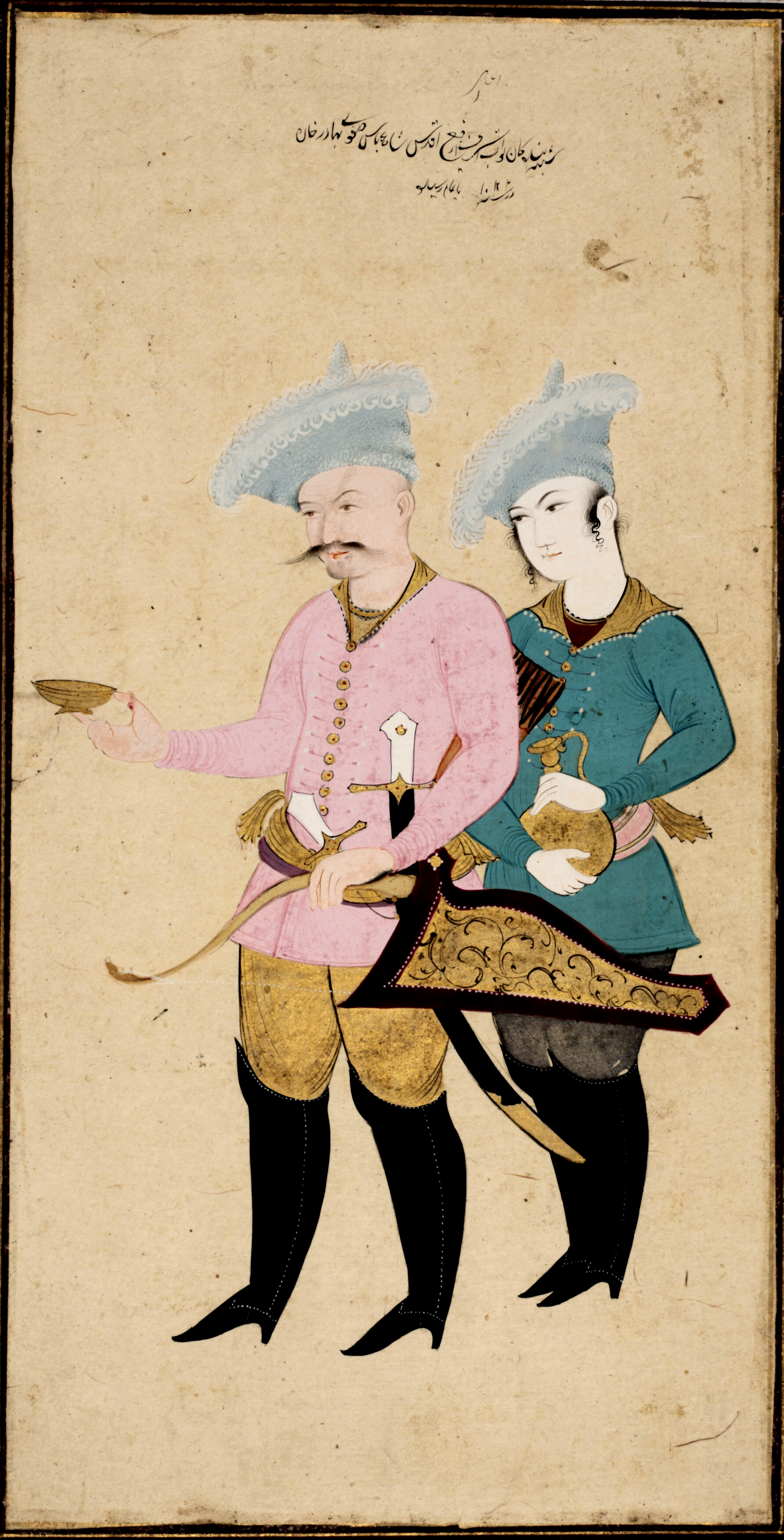
Portrait of Shah Abbas I and a Page. Painted in 1632–33 by Mo'in-i Musavver. Arthur M. Sackler Museum, Harvard University Art Museums, 1960.48.

Between 1614 and 1616, during the Ottoman–Safavid War, Abbas suppressed a rebellion led by his formerly loyal Georgian subjects Luarsab II and Teimuraz I.

In 1606, Abbas had appointed these Georgians onto the thrones of Safavid vassals Kartli and Kakheti, at the behest of Kartlian nobles and Teimuraz's mother Ketevan; both seemed like malleable youths. However, tensions soon arose between the Shah and the Georgian kings. In 1613, when the Shah summoned them to join him on a hunting expedition in Mazandaran, they did not appear as they feared that they would be either imprisoned or killed. At this point war broke out, Iranian armies invaded the two territories in March 1614, and the two allied kings subsequently sought refuge in the Ottoman vassal Imereti. Abbas, as reported by the Safavid court historian Iskandar Beg Munshi, was infuriated by what was perceived as the defection of two of his most trusted subjects and gholams. He deported 30,000 Kakhetian peasants to Iran, and appointed a grandson of Alexander II of Kakheti to the throne of Kakheti, Jesse (also known as "Isā Khān"). Raised up at the court in Isfahan and a Muslim, he was perceived as fully loyal to the Shah.

Abbas threatened Imeretia with devastation if they did not give up the fugitive kings; the Imeretian, Mingrelian and Gurian rulers jointly refused his demand. Luarsab, however, surrendered voluntarily to the Shah; Abbas initially treated him well but when he learned that Luarsab and Teimuraz had offered an alliance with the Ottomans he demanded that Luarsab accept Islam. When Luarsab refused, he was thrown in prison.

Teimuraz returned to eastern Georgia in 1615, taking advantage of a resurgence in Ottoman–Safavid hostilities, and there he defeated a Safavid force. However, when the Ottoman army postponed its invasion of the Safavids, Abbas was able to briefly send an army back to defeat Teimuraz, and redoubled his invasion after brokering a truce with the Ottomans. Now Iranian rule was fully restored over eastern Georgia. In a punitive expedition to Kakhetia, his army then killed perhaps 60,000–70,000 or 100,000 Georgians, with twice as many more being deported to Iran, removing about two-thirds of the Kakhetian population. More refugees were rounded up in 1617. In 1619 Abbas appointed the loyal Simon II (or Semayun Khan) as a puppet ruler of Kartli, while placing a series of his own governors to rule over districts where the rebellious inhabitants were mostly located.

Having momentarily secured the region, Abbas took further acts of revenge for the recalcitrance of Teimuraz and Luarsab. He castrated Teimuraz's sons, who both died shortly afterwards. He executed Luarsab in 1622, and in 1624 he had Ketevan, who had been sent to the Shah as a negotiator, tortured to death when she refused to renounce Christianity. Teimuraz, meanwhile, sought aid from the Ottomans and Russia.

Abbas was then warned of another imminent Kakhetian uprising, so he returned to Georgia in early 1625. He lured Kakhetian soldiers on a false pretext and then began executing them. He also had plans to execute all armed Kartlians, including his own general Giorgi Saakadze; however Saakadze intercepted a courier and uncovered the plot. Saakadze then defected to the Georgians, and led a new rebellion which succeeded in throwing the Persians out of Kartli and Kakheti while crowning Teimuraz as king of both territories. Abbas counterattacked in June, won the subsequent war and dethroned Teimuraz, but lost half his army at the hands of the Georgians and was forced to accept Kartli and Kakheti only as vassal states while abandoning his plans to eliminate Christians from the area.

Even then, Saakadze and Teimuraz launched another rebellion in 1626, and were effective in clearing Iranian forces from most of the region. Thus, the Georgian territories continued to resist Safavid encroachments until Abbas' death.

=== Persian-Mughal relations ===
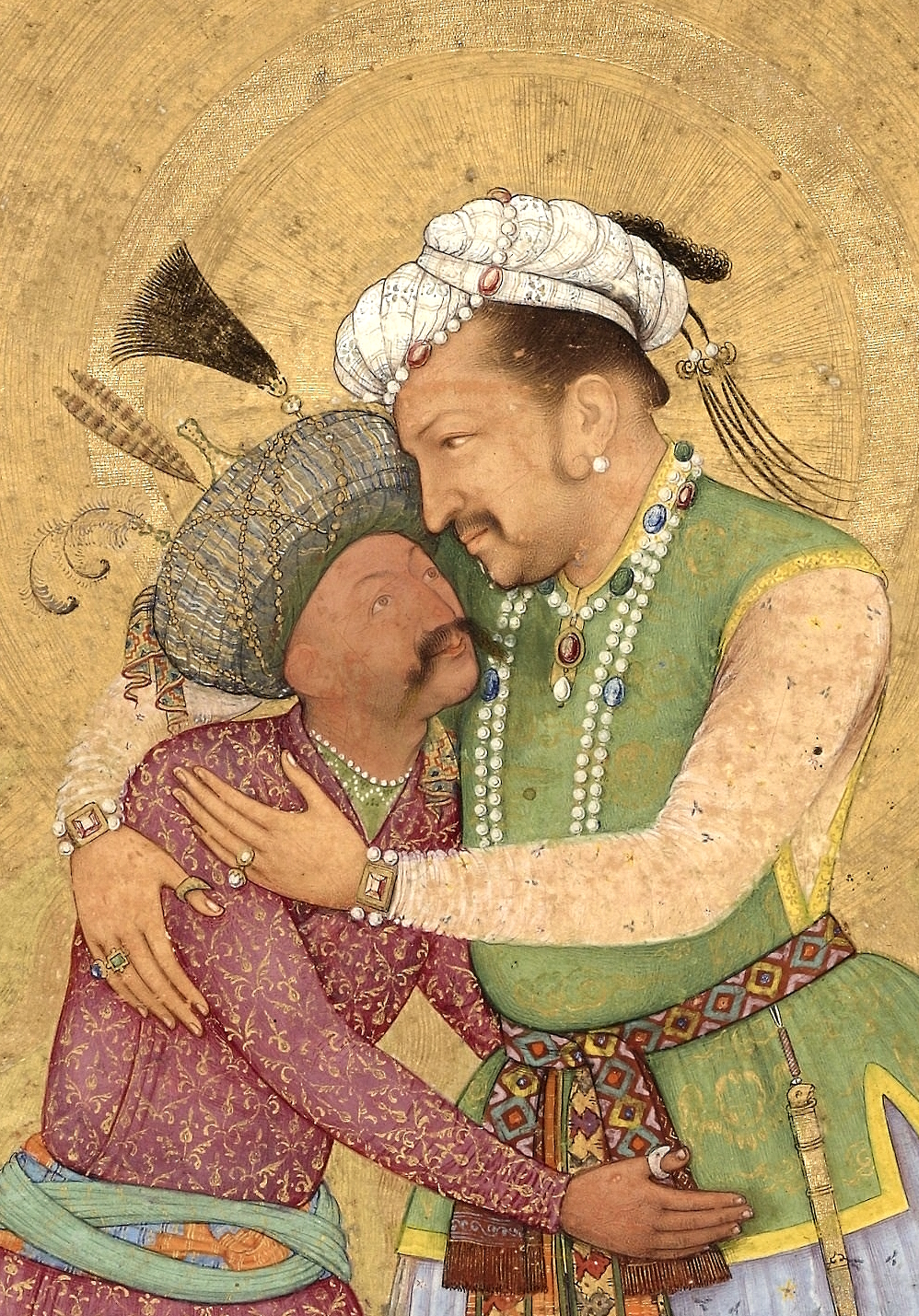
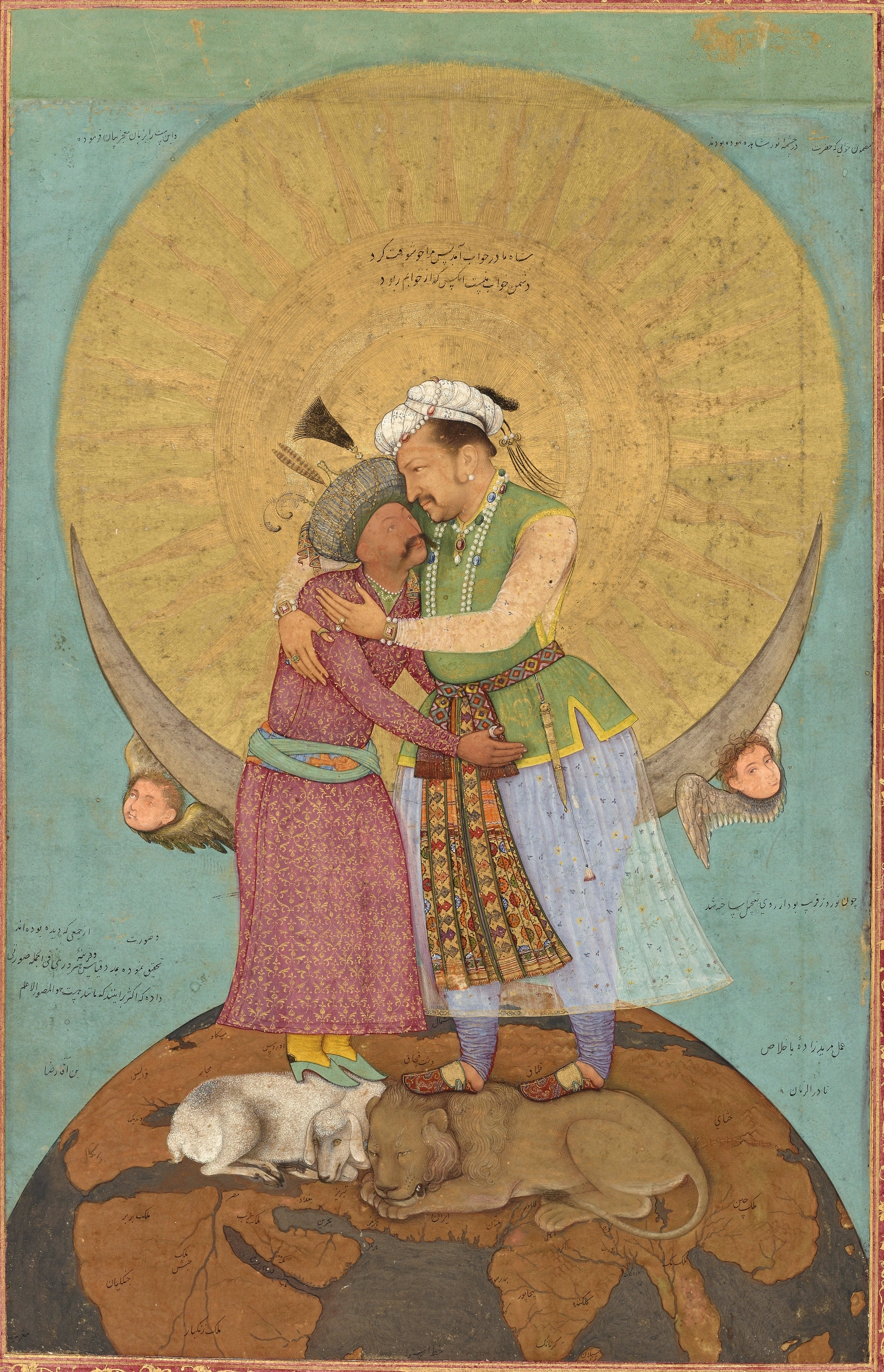
Shah Abbas (left) in embrace with Jahangir (right), standing on top of the world. Contemporary Mughal painting by Abu'l Hasan, circa 1618, of an imaginary encounter between the two rulers.

The Safavids were traditionally allied with the Mughals in India against the Uzbeks, who coveted the province of Khorasan. The Mughal emperor Humayun had given Abbas' grandfather, Shah Tahmasp, the province of Kandahar as a reward for helping him regain his throne. In 1590, profiting from the confusion in Iran, Humayun's successor Akbar seized Kandahar. Abbas continued to maintain cordial relations with the Mughals, even though he pursued the return of Kandahar.

In 1613, the Mughal emperor Jahangir sent an embassy to the Persian court, led by Khan ‘Alam. The embassy would remain until 1619. Khan ‘Alam brought numerous gifts to Shah Abbas, including jewelry, and rare objects. He spent five years at the Safavid court, where he was in close contact with Shah Abbas. Upon his return, Khan ‘Alam left with gifts for Jahangir, including 240 portraits of Timur and his descendants. The embassy famously included the Mughal painter Bishandas, to paint the portraits of Shah Abbas and other leading Persian figures such as Abbas's second son Soltan Mohammad Mirza, Saru Taqi or Isa Khan.

Finally, in 1620, a diplomatic incident, in which the Iranian ambassador refused to bow down in front of the Emperor Jahangir, led to war. India was embroiled in civil turmoil and Abbas realized that he needed just a lightning raid to take back the far easternmost town of Kandahar in 1622.

After the conquest, he was very conciliatory to Jahangir, claiming he had only taken back what was rightly his and disavowing any further territorial ambitions. Jahangir was not appeased but he was unable to recapture the province. A childhood friend of Abbas, named Ganj Ali Khan, was then appointed as the governor of the city, which he would govern until his death in 1624/5.

=== War against the Portuguese ===
Abbas the Great effectively safeguarded the integrity of Persian borders, expelled the Portuguese from Hormuz Island in the Persian Gulf, and solidified Iran's identity as a national state.

During the 16th century, the Portuguese had established bases in the Persian Gulf. In 1602, the Iranian army under the command of Imam Quli Khan Undiladze managed to expel the Portuguese from Bahrain. In 1622, with the help of four English ships, Abbas retook Hormuz from the Portuguese. He replaced it as a trading centre with a new port, Bandar Abbas, nearby on the mainland, but it never became successful.

== Shah and his subjects ==
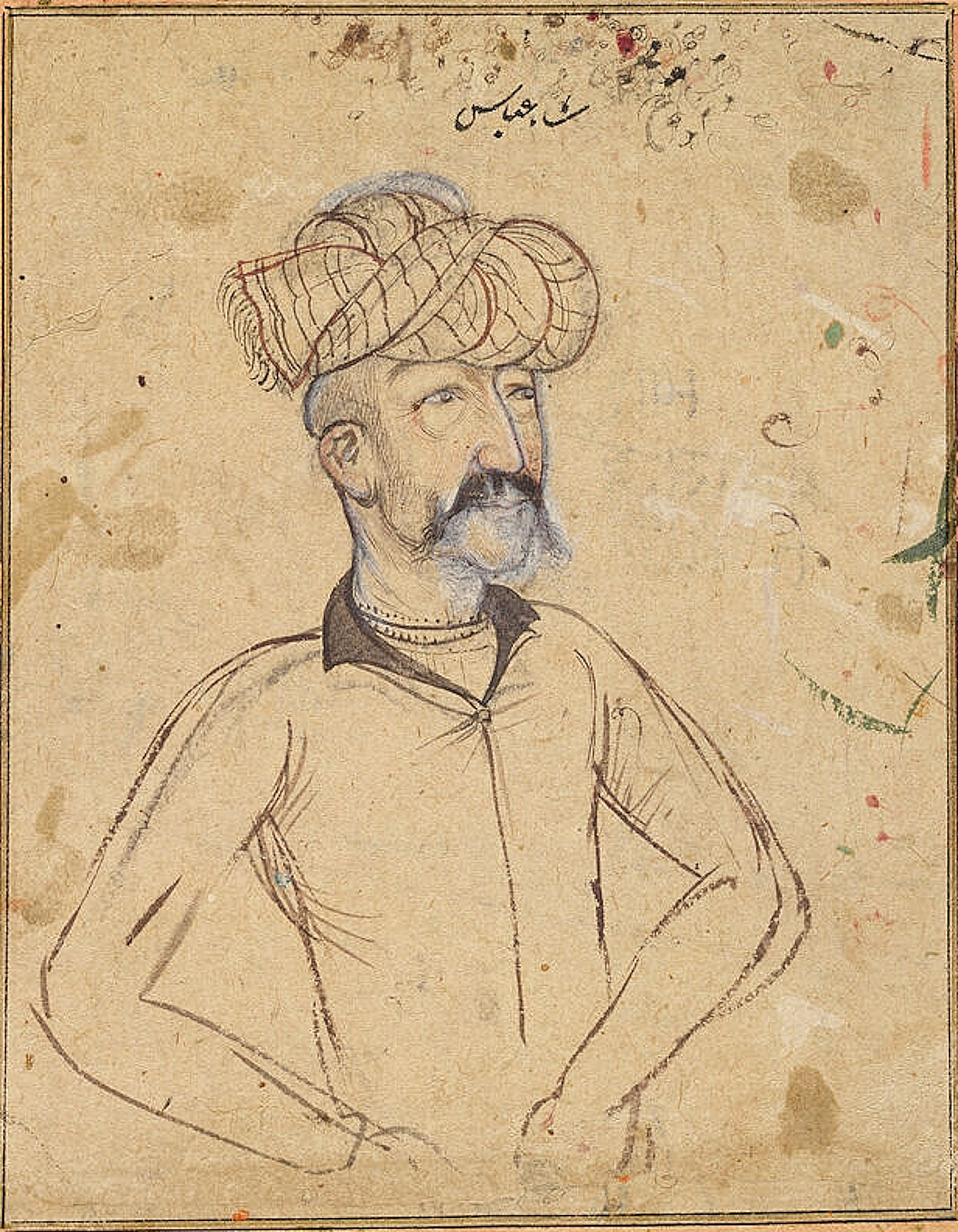
Sketch of Shah ‘Abbas I, from life. Attributed to Bishandas, circa 1617.

=== Isfahan: a new capital ===
Abbas moved his capital from Qazvin to the more central city of Isfahan in 1598. Embellished by a magnificent series of new mosques, baths, colleges, and caravansarais, Isfahan became one of the most beautiful cities in the world. As Roger Savory writes, "Not since the development of Baghdad in the eighth century A.D. by the Caliph al-Mansur had there been such a comprehensive example of town-planning in the Islamic world, and the scope and layout of the city centre clearly reflect its status as the capital of an empire." Isfahan became the centre of Safavid architectural achievement, with the mosques Masjed-e Shah and the Masjed-e Sheykh Lotfollah and other monuments including the Ali Qapu, the Chehel Sotoun palace and the Naqsh-e Jahan Square.

In making Isfahan the centre of the Safavid Empire, Abbas utilized the Armenians, whom he had forcibly relocated to Isfahan from their homeland in the Armenian highlands. Once they were settled, he allowed them considerable freedom and encouraged them to continue in their silk trade. Silk was an integral part of the economy and considered to be the best form of hard currency available. The Armenians had already established trade networks that allowed Abbas to strengthen Iran's economy.

=== Arts ===
Abbas' painting studios (of the Isfahan school established under his patronage) created some of the finest art in modern Iranian history, by such illustrious painters as Reza Abbasi and Muhammad Qasim. Despite the ascetic roots of the Ṣafavid dynasty and the religious injunctions restricting the pleasures lawful to the faithful, the art of Abbas' time denoted a certain relaxation of the strictures. The portrait by Muhammad Qasim suggests that the Muslim prohibition against the consumption of wine, as well as that against male intimacy, "were more honoured in the breach than in the observance". Abbas brought in 300 Chinese potters to Iran to enhance local production of Chinese-style ceramics.

Under Abbas' reign, carpet weaving increased its role as an important part of Persian industry and culture, as wealthy Europeans started importing Persian rugs. Silk production became a monopoly of the crown, and manuscripts, bookbinding, and ceramics were also important exports.

=== Attitude towards religious minorities ===
Like almost all other Safavid monarchs, Abbas was a Shi'ite Muslim. He had a particular veneration for Imam Hussein. In 1601, he made a pilgrimage on foot from Isfahan to Mashhad, site of the shrine of Imam Reza, which he restored (it had been despoiled by the Uzbeks). Since Sunni Islam was the religion of Iran's main rival, the Ottoman Empire, Abbas often treated Sunnis living in western border provinces harshly.

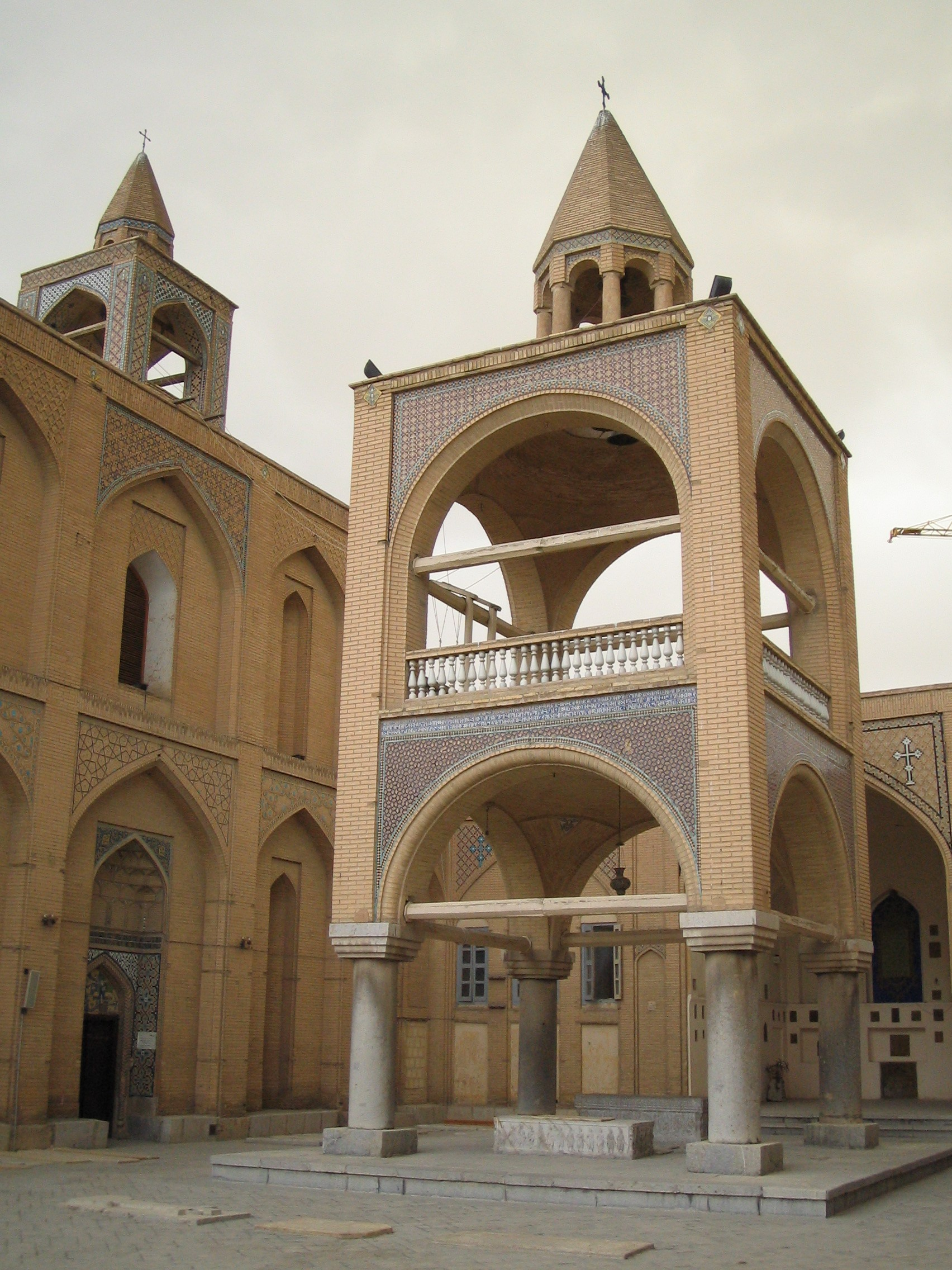
Kelisa-e Vank (the Armenian Vank Cathedral) in New Julfa

Abbas was usually tolerant of Christianity. The Italian traveller Pietro Della Valle was astonished at the Shah's knowledge of Christian history and theology and establishing diplomatic links with European Christian states was a vital part of the shah's foreign policy. Therefore, Abbas allowed the establishment of Roman Catholic missions in Persia in his realm and the building of churches and monasteries though he forbade them converting Muslims.

Abbas' treatment of Armenian Christians varied between different times. Christian Armenia was a key Safavid province bordering the Ottoman Empire. While he awarded some Armenians monopolies on his silk trading houses and participated in 1620 in an Armenian religious ceremony, at other times he deported Armenians and in 1621, he set strong economic incentives for Armenians to convert and sent generals to forcibly convert Armenians communities at the edges of his empire. From 1604 Abbas implemented a "scorched earth" policy in Persian Armenia to protect his north-western frontier against any invading Ottoman forces, a policy that involved the forced resettlement of up to 300,000 Armenians from their homelands. The Armenians came primarily from the wealthy Armenian merchant town of Jugha (also known as Jolfa). Many were transferred to New Julfa, a town the shah had built for the Armenians primarily meant for these Armenians from Jugha ("Old Julfa"), near his capital Isfahan. Thousands of Armenians died on the journey. Those who survived enjoyed considerable religious freedom in New Julfa, where the shah built them a new cathedral. Abbas' aim was to boost the Iranian economy by encouraging the Armenian merchants who had moved to New Julfa. As well as religious liberties, he also offered them interest-free loans and allowed the town to elect its own mayor (kalantar). Other Armenians were transferred to the provinces of Gilan and Mazandaran. These were less lucky. Abbas wanted to establish a second capital in Mazandaran, Farahabad, but the climate was unhealthy and malarial. Many settlers died and others gradually abandoned the city.

Abbas was more intolerant of Christians in Georgia, where the threat of rebellion loomed larger. Abbas frequently demanded that nobles convert to Shia Islam, and had Ketevan the Martyr tortured to death when she refused. Abbas's anger at Georgian rebelliousness also generated his plan to deport or exterminate eastern Georgia's Christians and replace them with Turkmens, which has been described as "genocidal".

== Contacts with Europe ==
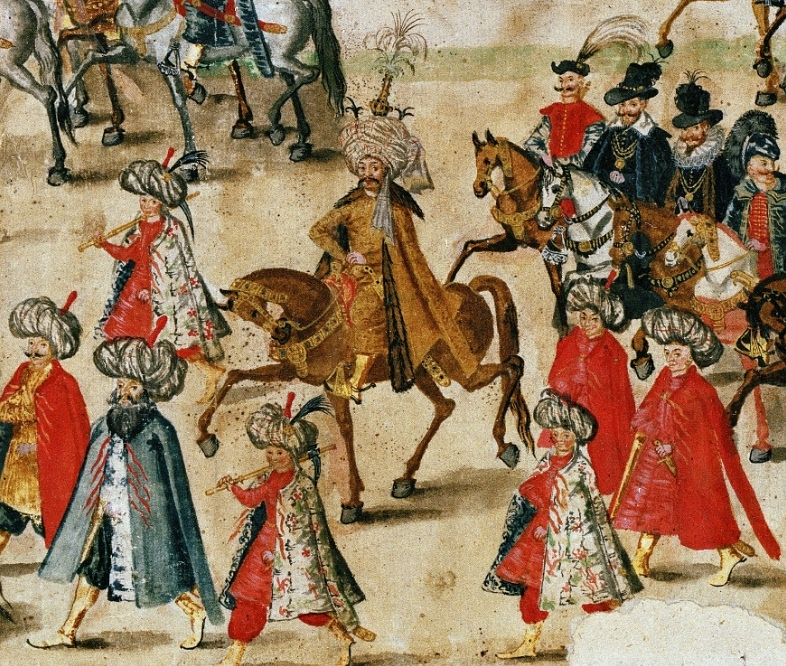
Persian ambassador during his entry into Kraków for the wedding ceremonies of King Sigismund III Vasa in 1605.

Abbas' tolerance towards most Christians was part of his policy of establishing diplomatic links with European powers to try to enlist their help in the fight against their common enemy, the Ottoman Empire. These diplomatic contacts took place during the Long Turkish War (1593–1606), when the Habsburg monarchy was fighting the Ottoman Empire in Hungary. The idea of such an anti-Ottoman alliance was not a new one – over a century before, Uzun Hassan, then ruler of part of Iran, had asked the Venetians for military aid – but none of the Safavids had made diplomatic overtures to Europe and Abbas' attitude was in marked contrast to that of his grandfather, Tahmasp I, who had expelled the English traveller Anthony Jenkinson from his court upon hearing he was a Christian. For his part, Abbas declared that he "preferred the dust from the shoe soles of the lowest Christian to the highest Ottoman personage".

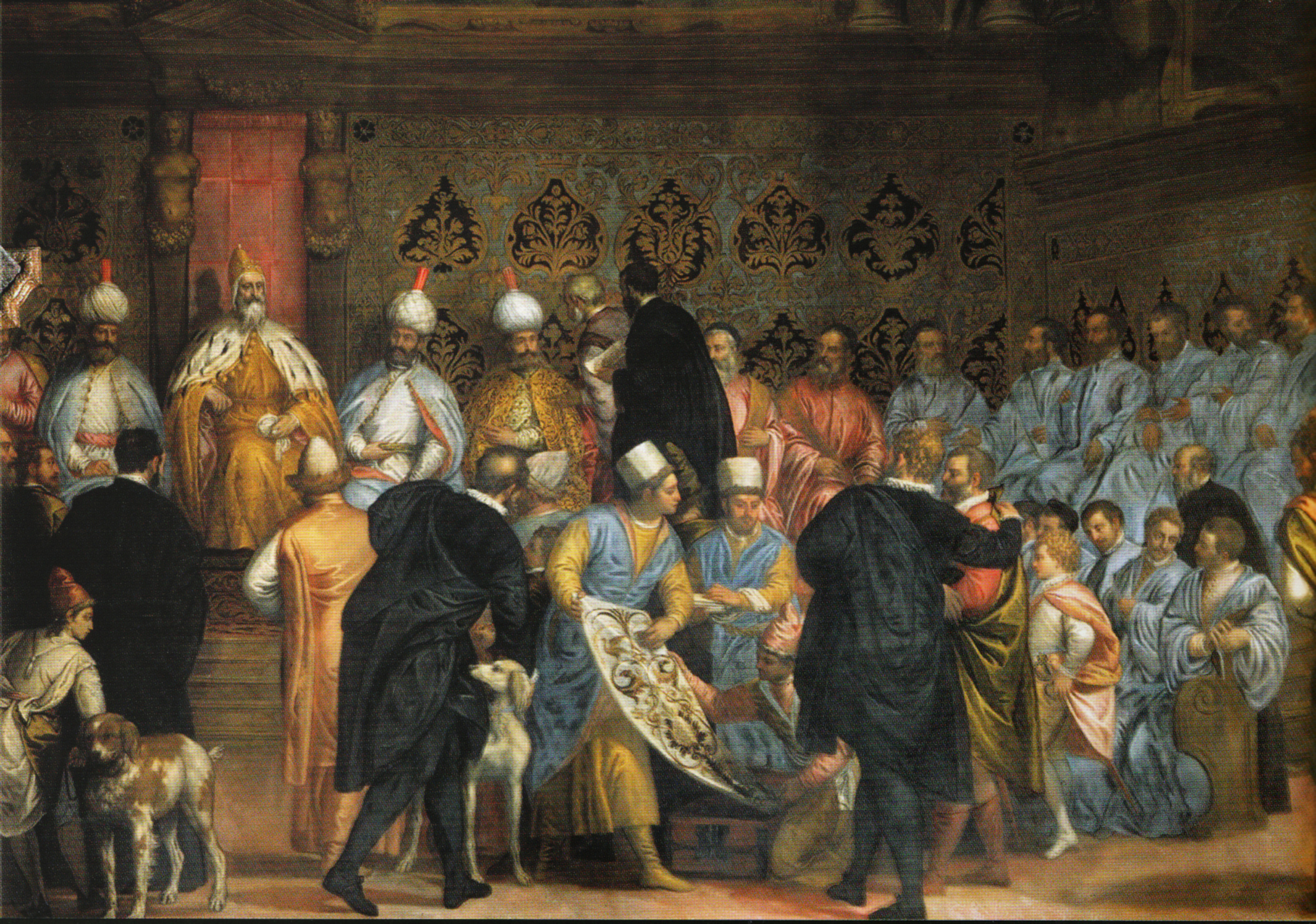
Canvas by Carlo and Gabriele Caliari in the Doge's Palace in Venice depicting doge Marino Grimani receiving the Persian ambassadors, 1603

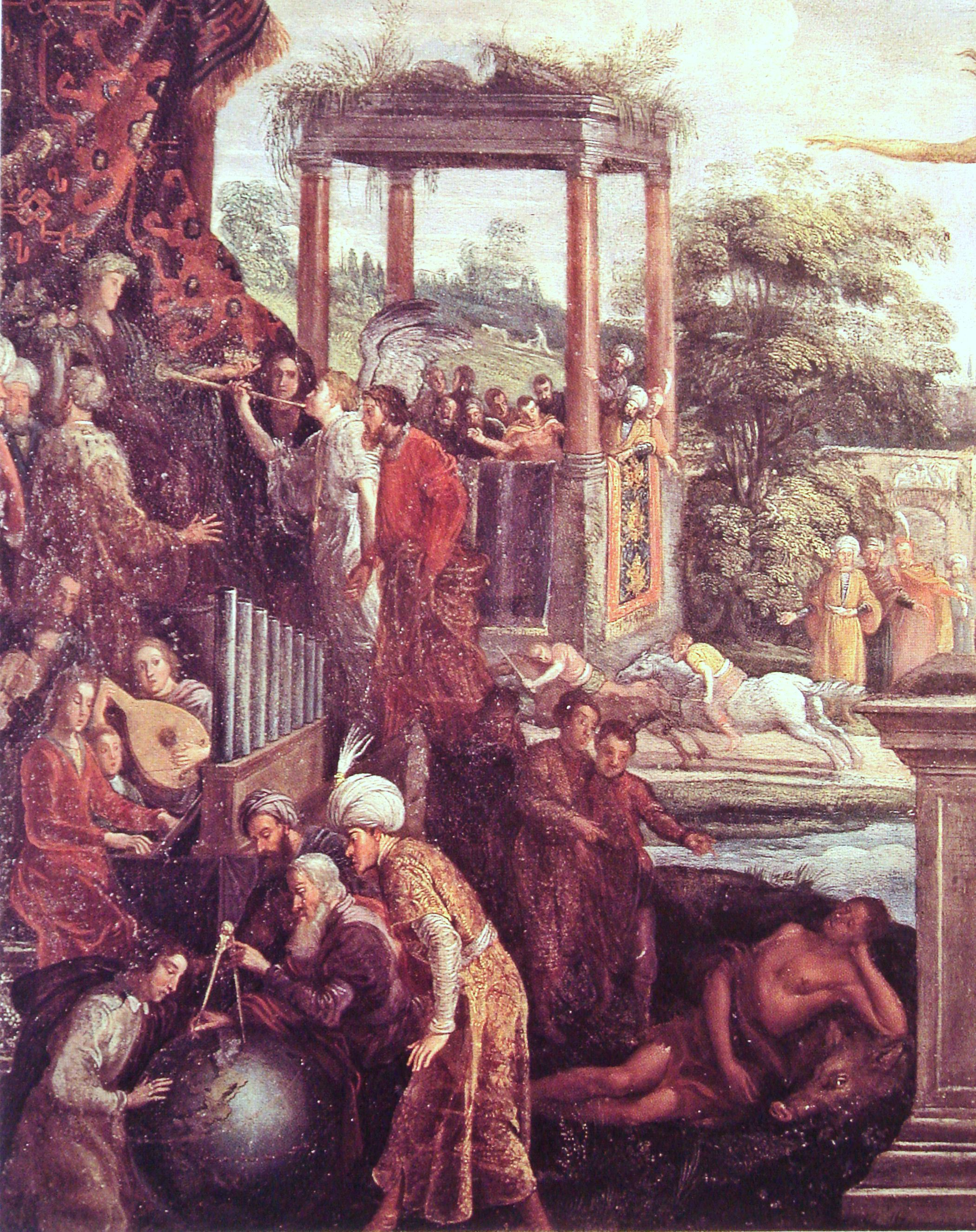
Abbas I as a new Caesar being honoured by the Trumpets of Fame, together with the 1609–1615 Persian embassy, in Allégorie de l'Occasion, by Frans II Francken, 1628.

In 1599, Abbas sent his first diplomatic mission to Europe. The group crossed the Caspian Sea and spent the winter in Moscow, before proceeding through Norway, Germany (where it was received by Emperor Rudolf II) to Rome where Pope Clement VIII gave the travellers a long audience. They finally arrived at the court of Philip III of Spain in 1602. Although the expedition never managed to return to Iran, being shipwrecked on the journey around Africa, it marked an important new step in contacts between Iran and Europe and Europeans began to be fascinated by the Iranians and their culture – Shakespeare's 1601–02 Twelfth Night, for example, makes two references (at II.5 and III.4) to 'the Sophy', then the English term for the Shahs of Iran. Persian fashions—such as shoes with heels, for men—were enthusiastically adopted by European aristocrats. Henceforward, the number of diplomatic missions to and from Persia greatly increased.

Persian ambassadors at the court of Emperor Rudolf II, depicted in the Vladislav Hall at Prague Castle.

The shah had set great store on an alliance with Spain, the chief opponent of the Ottomans in Europe. Abbas offered trading rights and the chance to preach Christianity in Iran in return for help against the Ottomans. But the stumbling block of Hormuz remained, a port that had fallen into Spanish hands when the King of Spain inherited the throne of Portugal in 1580. The Spanish demanded Abbas break off relations with the English East India Company before they would consider relinquishing the town. Abbas was unable to comply. Eventually Abbas became frustrated with Spain, as he did with the Holy Roman Empire, which wanted him to make his 400,000+ Armenian subjects swear allegiance to the Pope but did not trouble to inform the shah when the Emperor Rudolf signed a peace treaty with the Ottomans. Contacts with the Pope, Poland and Muscovy were no more fruitful.

More came of Abbas' contacts with the English, although England had little interest in fighting against the Ottomans. The Shirley brothers arrived in 1598 and helped reorganise the Iranian army, which proved to be pivotal for the Safavid victory in the Ottoman-Safavid War (1603–1618) and the first Safavid victory in battle over their neighbouring Ottoman archrivals. One of the Shirley brothers, Robert Shirley, led Abbas' second diplomatic mission to Europe between 1609 and 1615. The English East India Company also began to take an interest in Iran and in 1622 four of its ships helped Abbas retake Hormuz from the Portuguese. The capture of Ormuz gave the opportunity for the Company to develop trade with Persia, attempting to trade English cloth and other commodities for silk, with did not become very profitable due to the lack of Persian interest and small quantity of English goods.

== Family tragedies and death ==
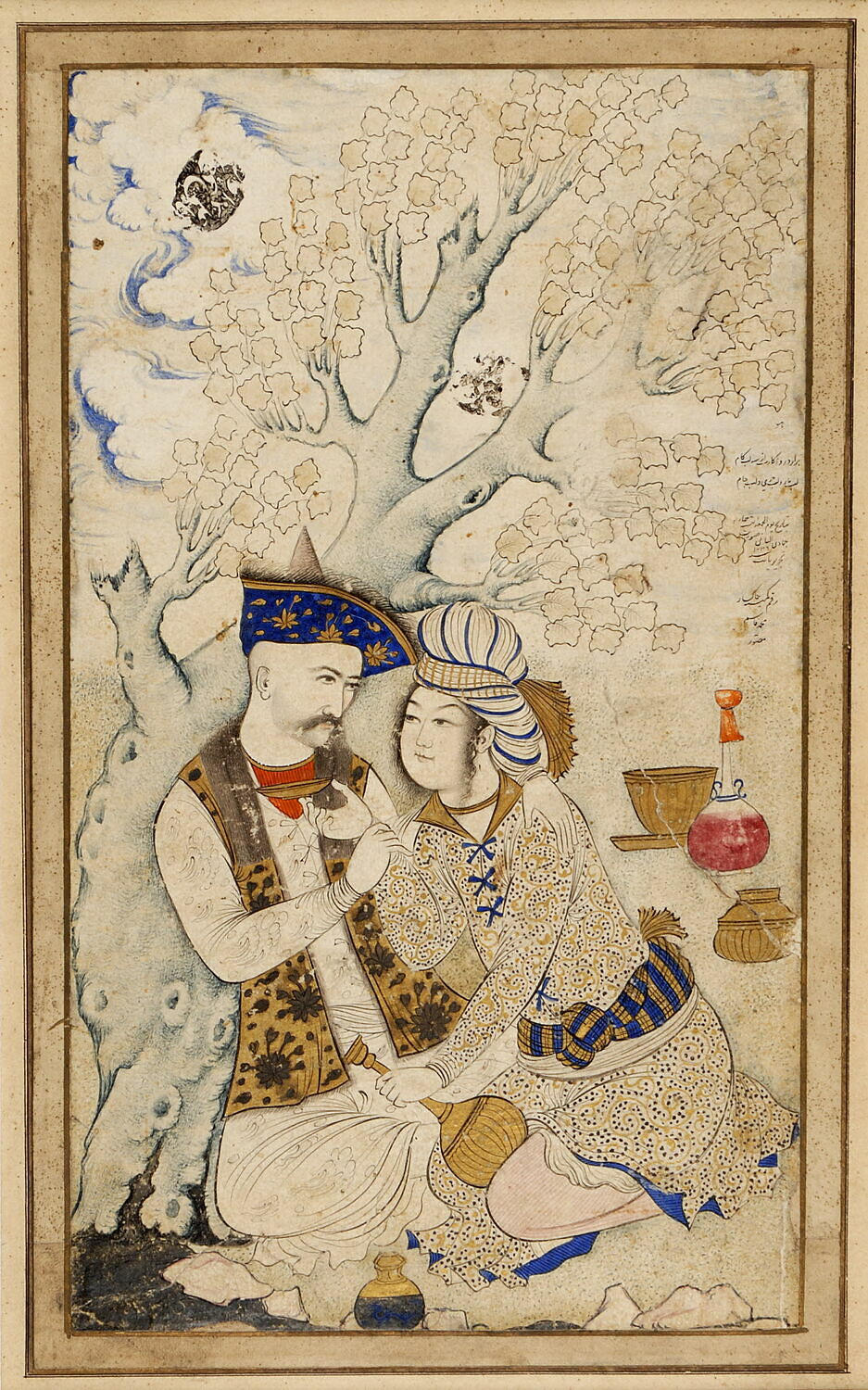
Shah Abbas later in life with a page. By Muhammad Qasim (1627).

Of Abbas' five sons, three had survived past childhood, so the Safavid succession seemed secure. He was on good terms with Crown Prince Mohammad Baqer Mirza (born 1587; better known in the West as Safi Mirza). In 1614, however, during a campaign in Georgia, the shah heard rumours that the prince was conspiring against him with a leading Circassian, Farhad Beg Cherkes. Shortly after, Mohammad Baqir broke protocol during a hunt by killing a boar before the shah had a chance to put his spear in the animal. This seemed to confirm Abbas' suspicions and he sunk into melancholy; he no longer trusted any of his three sons. In 1615, he decided he had no choice but to have Mohammad killed. A Circassian named Behbud Beg executed the Shah's orders and the prince was murdered in a hammam in the city of Rasht. The shah almost immediately regretted his action and was plunged into grief.

In 1621, Abbas fell seriously ill. His heir, Mohammad Khodabanda, thought he was on his deathbed and began to celebrate his accession to the throne with his Qizilbash supporters. But the shah recovered and punished his son by blinding him, which would disqualify him from ever taking the throne. The blinding was only partially successful and the prince's followers planned to smuggle him out of the country to safety with the Mughals whose aid they would use to overthrow Abbas and install Mohammad on the throne. But the plot was betrayed, the prince's followers were executed and the prince himself imprisoned in Alamut Castle where he would later be murdered by Abbas' successor, Shah Safi.

Imam Qoli Mirza, the third and last son, then became the crown prince. Abbas groomed him carefully for the throne but, for some reason, in 1627, he had him partially blinded and imprisoned in Alamut.

Unexpectedly, Abbas now chose as heir the son of Mohammad Baqir Mirza, Sam Mirza, a cruel and introverted character who was said to loathe his grandfather because of his father's murder. Nevertheless, he did succeed Shah Abbas at the age of 17 in 1629, taking the name Shah Safi. Abbas's health was poor from 1621 onwards. He died at his palace in Farahabad on the Caspian coast in 1629 and was buried in Kashan.

== Character and legacy ==
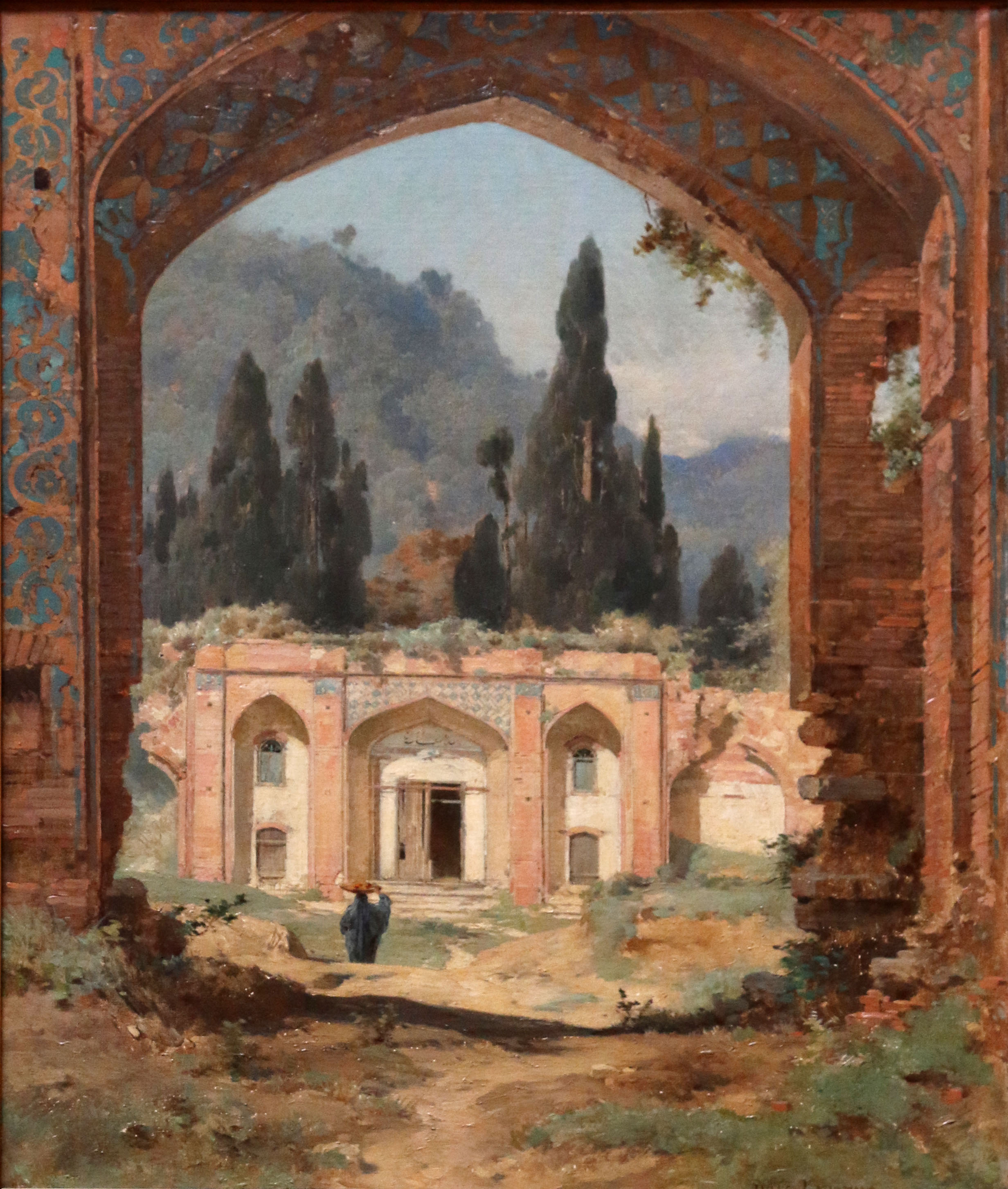
Chehel Sotoun Palace (or Shah Palace) in Behshahr by Jules Laurens, the palace where Abbas the Great died.

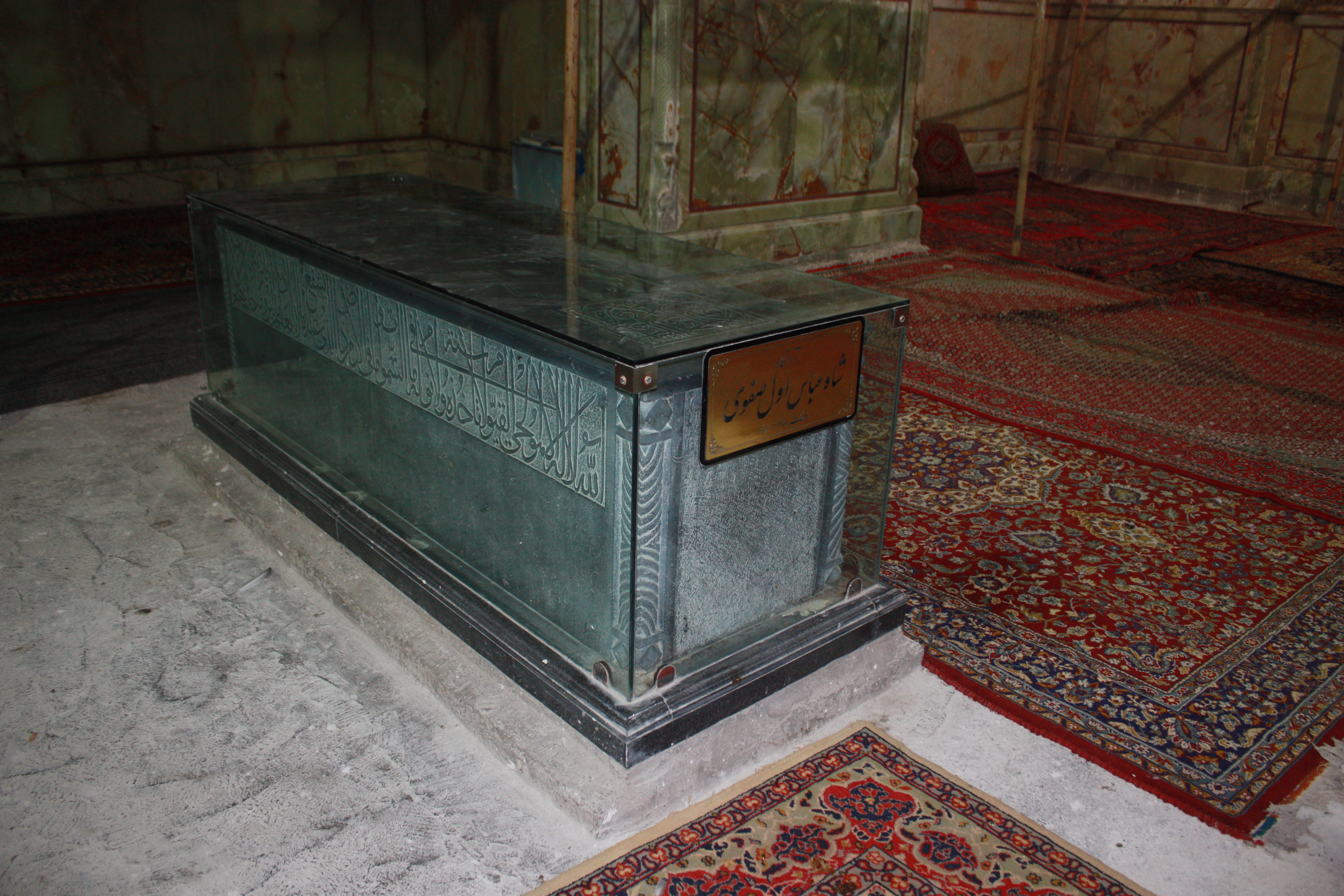
Tomb, the Mausoleum of Shah Abbas I.

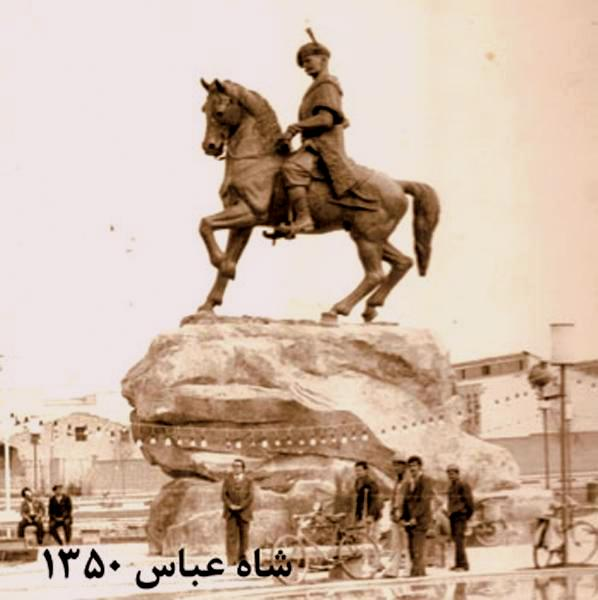
The Statue of Shah Abbas, which was on display in Isfahan before the Iranian Revolution

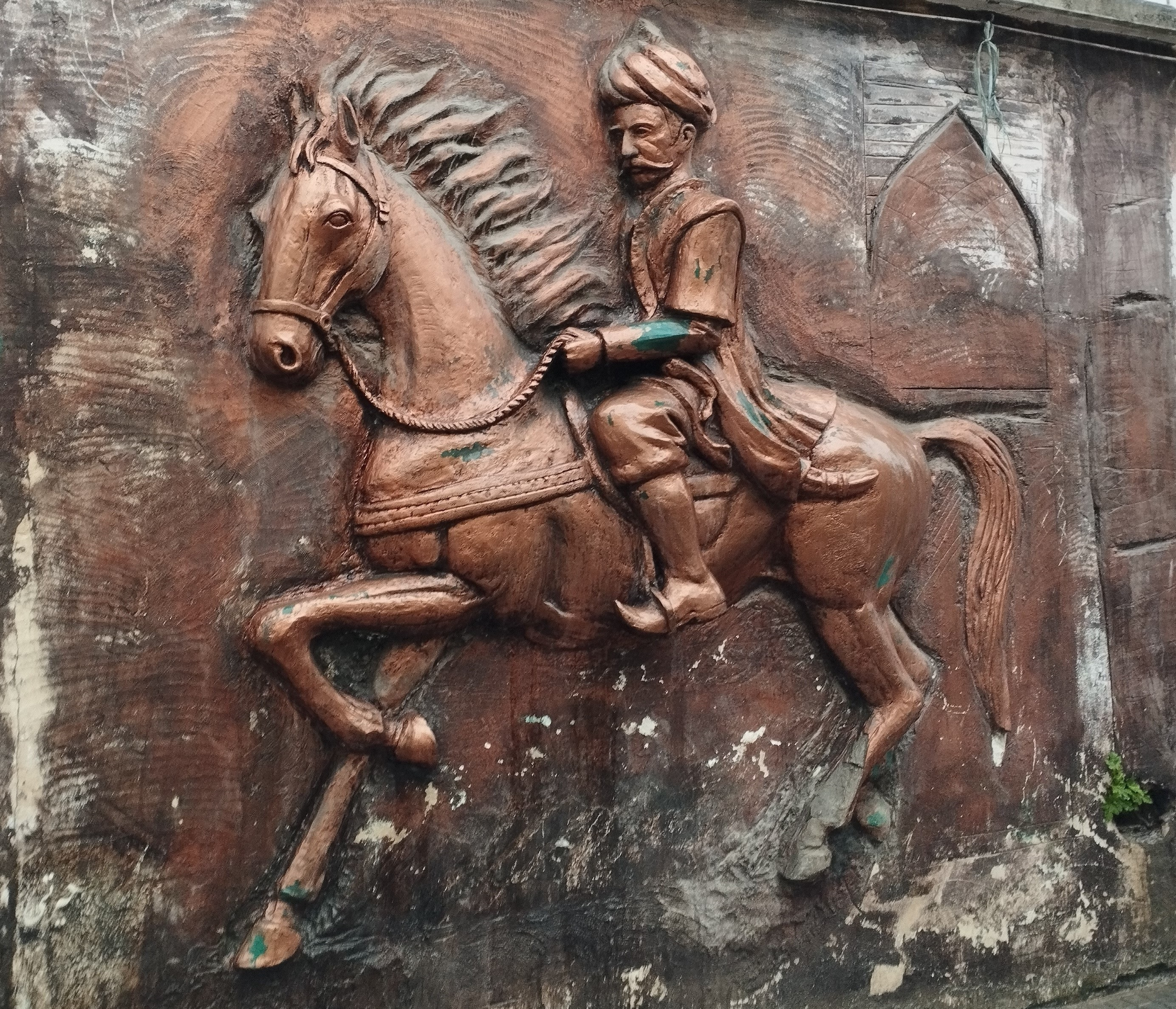
The Statue of Abbas the Great in Behshahr, Mazandaran, Iran

Abbas projected great military power, regained most of the lands lost by his predecessors, and adopted a set of forward-looking policies designed to optimise military strength, centralise state control, and expand Iran's internal and international commercial scope. He paired ruthlessness with justice and dealt harshly with threats to his power, while remaining in touch with his people. These qualities ultimately led to his being styled Abbas the Great.

Roger Savory, in the introduction to the book Tarikh-e Alam-ara-ye Abbasi, quotes about Shah Abbas.

"None of the kings who ruled Persia in Islamic times has achieved the fame and glory enjoyed by Shah Abbas the Great. An outstanding monarch of extraordinary ability and drive, he must be considered the chief architect of the modern Iranian state. Shah Abbas is the most celebrated figure of the Safavid dynasty founded by Shah Esma'il I."

Abbas I is generally considered one of the greatest rulers of Iranian history and the Safavid dynasty. According to Roger Savory: "Shah Abbas I possessed in abundance qualities which entitle him to be styled 'the Great'. He was a brilliant strategist and tactician whose chief characteristic was prudence. He preferred to obtain his ends by diplomacy rather than war, and showed immense patience in pursuing his objectives." In Michael Axworthy's view, Abbas "was a talented administrator and military leader, and a ruthless autocrat. His reign was the outstanding creative period of the Safavid era. But the civil wars and troubles of his childhood (when many of his relatives were murdered) left him with a dark twist of suspicion and brutality at the centre of his personality." Donald Rayfield described him as "exceptionally perspicacious and active," but also "a murderous paranoiac when aroused."

The Cambridge History of Iran rejects the view that the death of Abbas marked the beginning of the decline of the Safavid dynasty as Iran continued to prosper throughout the 17th century, but blames him for the poor statesmanship of the later Safavid shahs: "The elimination of royal princes, whether by blinding or immuring them in the harem, their exclusion from the affairs of state and from contact with the leading aristocracy of the empire and the generals, all the abuses of the princes' education, which were nothing new but which became the normal practice with Abbas at the court of Isfahan, effectively put a stop to the training of competent successors, that is to say, efficient princes prepared to meet the demands of ruling as kings."

Abbas was fluent in the Turkic dialect used by the Turkoman portion of the multi-ethnic Qizilbash organization, although he was equally at ease speaking Persian, which was the language of the administration and culture, of the majority of the population, as well as of the court when Isfahan became the capital under his reign (1598). (Note: "Shah Abbas moved his capital from Qazvin to Isfahan. His reign marked the peak of Safavid dynasty's achievement in art, diplomacy, and commerce. It was probably around this time that the court, which originally spoke a Turkic language, began to use Persian". Quoted from Glassé (2001), p. 392.) According to García de Silva Figueroa, the Spanish ambassador to the Safavid court during Abbas' later reign, he heard Abbas speak Georgian, which he had doubtlessly acquired from his Georgian gholams and concubines.

Abbas gained strong support from the common people. Sources report him spending much of his time among them, personally visiting bazaars and other public places in Isfahan. Short in stature but physically strong until his health declined in his final years, Abbas could go for long periods without needing to sleep or eat and could ride great distances. At the age of nineteen, Abbas shaved off his beard, keeping only his moustache, thus setting a fashion in Iran.

Abbas was also a charismatic orator who could persuade and influence people with his eloquence. Classic Turkmen poet Magtymguly, who lived a century after Abbas, mentioned him in the poem "Zer bolmaz" (Not a jewel) with the following verses:

سخنور من ديان کوپدير جهانده
هيچ کيم شاه عباس دک سخنور بولماز
There are many who'd say they are good orators,
Though nobody is as eloquent as Shah Abbas.

Shah ‘Abbas, despite his notable achievements, was also an autocrat, often imposing severe penalties and neutralizing many of his relatives. Nevertheless, his leadership, economic knowledge, and vision distinguished him as a notable leader. Stories of his wisdom and fairness have enriched Persian folklore. The elegant caravanserais and public water reservoirs that modern travelers can still observe at ancient Persian waypoints stand as testaments to his achievements.

== Family ==
=== Consorts ===
- A Circassian concubine, mother of Mohammad Baqer Mirza;
- Fakhr Jahan Begum, daughter of King Bagrat VII and Queen Anna of Kakheti, and mother of Zubayda Begum;
- A daughter of Mustafa Mirza (m. 1587), daughter of Mustafa Mirza, son of Shah Tahmasp I;
- Olghan Pasha Khanum (m. 1587), daughter of Soltan Hosayn Mirza, son of Bahram Mirza Safavi, and widow of Hamza Mirza;
- Yakhan Begum (m. 1 September 1602), daughter of Khan Ahmad Khan and Maryam Begum;
- Princess Helena, daughter of King David I of Kakheti and Queen Ketevan the Martyr;
- Princess Marta, daughter of King David I of Kakheti and Queen Ketevan the Martyr. They married on 20 September 1604 and divorced in 1614;
- Fatima Sultan Begum also known a Peri and Lela, née Tinatin (married 1604 – div.), daughter of King George X and Queen Tamar Lipartiani;
- A sister of Ismail Khan, a Circassian, and Abbas' favourite wife;
- A daughter of Shaykh Lotfullah Maisi, a Shia theologian;
- Tamar Amilakhori, daughter of Faramarz Amilakhori and sister of Anduqapar Amilakhvari;

=== Sons ===
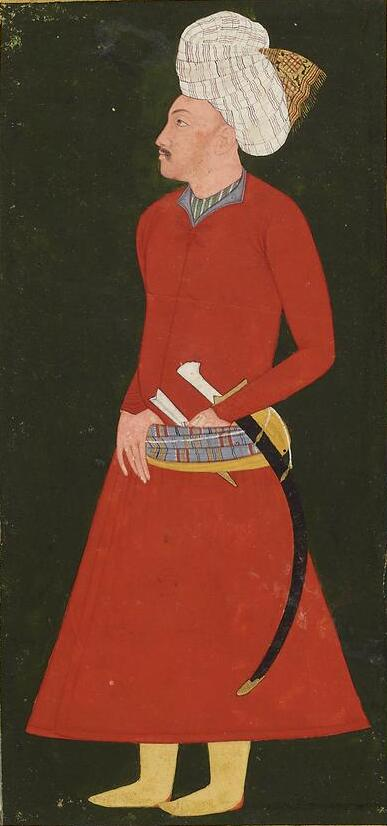
Contemporary painting of Soltan Mohammad Mirza, son of Abbas the Great, by or after Bishandas. Dated 1605–1627

- Mohammad Baqer Mirza (15 September 1587, Mashhad, Khorasan – killed 25 January 1615, Rasht, Gilan), was Governor of Mashhad 1587–1588, and of Hamadan 1591–1592. Married firstly at Esfahan, 1601, Princess Fakhr Jahan Begum, daughter of Ismail II, married secondly Dilaram Khanum, a Georgian. He had issue, two sons:
  - Sultan Abul-Naser Sam Mirza, succeeded as Safi – with Dilaram;
  - Sultan Suleiman Mirza (killed August 1632 at Alamut, Qazvin) – with Fakhr Jahan;
- Sultan Hasan Mirza (September 1588, Mazandaran – 18 August 1591, Qazvin);
- Soltan Mohammad Mirza (18 March 1591, Qazvin – killed August 1632, Alamut, Qazvin) Blinded on the orders of his father, 1621. Had issue, one daughter:
  - Gawhar Shad Begum, married to Mirza Qazi, the Shaykh-ul-Islam of Isfahan;
- Sultan Ismail Mirza (6 September 1601, Esfahan – killed 16 August 1613);
- Imam Qoli Mirza (12 November 1602, Esfahan – killed August 1632, Alamut, Qazvin) Blinded on the orders of his father, 1627. He had issue, one son:
  - Najaf Qoli Mirza (c. 1625 – killed August 1632, Alamut, Qazvin);

=== Daughters ===
- Shahzada Begum, married to Mirza Mohsin Razavi. and had issue two sons;
- Zubayda Begum (killed 20 February 1632), married to Isa Khan Shaykhavand, and had issue a daughter;
  - Jahan Banu Begum, married in 1624, Simon II of Kartli, son of Bagrat VII of Kartli by his wife, Queen Anna, daughter of Alexander II of Kakheti. She had issue, a daughter:
    - Princess Izz-i-Sharif Begum, married to Sayyid Abdullah, son of Mirza Muhammad Shafi. she had issue, a son:
      - Sayyid Muhammad Daud, married to Shahr Banu Begum, daughter of Suleiman I. She had issue, two sons including:
        - Suleiman II.
- Agha Begum, married to Sultan al-Ulama Khalife Sultan, and had issue four sons and four daughters;
- Havva Begum (died 1617, Zanjan), married firstly to Mirza Riza Shahristani (Sadr), married secondly to Mirza Rafi al-Din Muhammad (Sadr), and had issue three sons;
- Shahr Banu Begum, married to Mir Abdulazim, darughah of Isfahan;
- Malik Nissa Begum, married to Mir Jalal Shahristani, the mutvalli of the shrine of Imam Riza;

== Ancestry ==
Ancestors of Abbas the Great

8. Isma'il I, Shah of Iran
4. Tahmasp I, Shah of Iran
9. Tajlu Khanum
2. Muhammad Khodabanda, Shah of Iran
10. Musa Sultan Musullu
Sultanum Begum
1. Abbas I, Shah of Iran
12. Sultan Mahmud Marashi
6. Mir Abdullah Khan II Marashi, Ruler of Mazandaran
3. Khayr al-Nisa Begum
Fakhr al-Nisa Begum

== See also ==
- Battle of DimDim
- García de Silva Figueroa
- History of Iran
- Mausoleum of Shah Abbas I
- Persian embassy to Europe (1599–1602)
- Persian embassy to Europe (1609–1615)
- Safavid conversion of Iran from Sunnism to Shiism
- Shah Abbas Mosque, Yerevan
- Shah Abbas Mosque, Ganja

== Bibliography ==
=== Encyclopaedia Iranica ===
- Bosworth, Clifford E. (2013) [1988]. "Barda and Barda-Dāri v. Military slavery in Islamic Iran". In Yarshater, Ehsan (ed.). Encyclopædia Iranica (Online ed.). Encyclopædia Iranica Foundation.
- Madelung, Wilferd (2016) [1990]. "Baduspanids". In Yarshater, Ehsan (ed.). Encyclopædia Iranica (Online ed.). Encyclopædia Iranica Foundation.
- Manz, Beatrice Forbes; Haneda, Masashi (2016) [1990]. "Čarkas". In Yarshater, Ehsan (ed.). Encyclopædia Iranica (Online ed.). Encyclopædia Iranica Foundation.
- Matthee, Rudi (2013a) [2001]. "Georgia vii. Georgians in the Safavid Administration". In Yarshater, Ehsan (ed.). Encyclopædia Iranica (Online ed.). Encyclopædia Iranica Foundation.
- Matthee, Rudi (2013) [1999]. "Farhād Khan Qaramānlū, Rokn-al-Saltana". In Yarshater, Ehsan (ed.). Encyclopædia Iranica (Online ed.). Encyclopædia Iranica Foundation.
- Mitchell, Colin Paul (2012) [2009]. "Ṭahmāsp I". In Yarshater, Ehsan (ed.). Encyclopædia Iranica (Online ed.). Encyclopædia Iranica Foundation.
- Parizi, Mohammad-Ebrahim Bastani (2013) [2000]. "Ganj-ʿAlī Khan". In Yarshater, Ehsan (ed.). Encyclopædia Iranica (Online ed.). Encyclopædia Iranica Foundation.
- Savory, Roger M. (2017a) [1985]. "Allāhverdī Khan (1)". In Yarshater, Ehsan (ed.). Encyclopædia Iranica (Online ed.). Encyclopædia Iranica Foundation.
- Savory, Roger M. (2017) [1985]. "ʿAlī-Qolī Khan Šāmlū". In Yarshater, Ehsan (ed.). Encyclopædia Iranica (Online ed.). Encyclopædia Iranica Foundation.
- Savory, Roger M. (2018) [1982]. "Abbās I". In Yarshater, Ehsan (ed.). Encyclopædia Iranica (Online ed.). Encyclopædia Iranica Foundation.

=== Other sources ===
- Amanat, Abbas (2017). Iran: A Modern History. Yale University Press. ISBN 978-0300112542.
- Asat'iani, Nodar; Bendianachvili, Alexandre (1997). Histoire de la Géorgie [History of Georgia] (in French). Paris: L'Harmattan. ISBN 2-7384-6186-7. LCCN 98159624.
- Aslanian, Sebouh (2011). From the Indian Ocean to the Mediterranean: The Global Trade Networks of Armenian Merchants from New Julfa. University of California Press. ISBN 9780520947573.
- Axworthy, Michael (2007). Empire of the Mind: A History of Iran. C. Hurst & Co. ISBN 978-1-8506-5871-9. LCCN 2008399438.
- Babayan, Kathryn (2002). Mystics, Monarchs and Messiahs: Cultural Landscapes of Early Modern Iran. Harvard University Press. ISBN 9780932885289.
- Babaie, Sussan; Babayan, Kathryn; Baghdiantz-McCabe, Ina; Farhad, Massumeh (2004). Slaves of the Shah: New Elites of Safavid Iran. Library of Middle East History. I.B. Tauris. ISBN 978-1-8606-4721-5.
- Blow, David (2009). Shah Abbas: The Ruthless King Who Became an Iranian Legend. London, UK: I. B. Tauris. ISBN 978-1-84511-989-8. LCCN 2009464064.
- Bournoutian, George A. (2003). A Concise History of the Armenian People: (from Ancient Times to the Present) (2nd ed.). Mazda Publishers. ISBN 9781568591414.
- Casale, Sinem Arcak (2023). Gifts in the Age of Empire. Ottoman-Safavid Cultural Exchange, 1500–1639. The University of Chicago Press. ISBN 978-0226820422.
- Cole, Juan R.I. (May 1987). "Rival Empires of Trade and Imami Shi'ism in Eastern Arabia, 1300–1800". International Journal of Middle East Studies. 19 (2): 177–203. doi:10.1017/S0020743800031834. ISSN 0020-7438. JSTOR 163353. S2CID 162702326.
- Crill, Rosemary; Jariwala, Kapil, eds. (2010). The Indian portrait, 1560-1860. London: National Portrait Gallery. ISBN 9781855144095.
- Dale, Stephen F. (2010). The Muslim Empires of the Ottomans, Safavids, and Mughals. Cambridge University Press. ISBN 9780521691420. LCCN 2010278301.
- Eraly, Abraham (2000). Emperors of the Peacock Throne: The Saga of the Great Mughals. Penguin Books. ISBN 9780141001432.
- Glassé, Cyril (2001) [1989]. Drake, Nicholas; Davis, Elizabeth (eds.). The New Encyclopedia of Islam (revised ed.). AltaMira Press. ISBN 0759101892.
- Hoiberg, Dale H., ed. (2010). "Abbas I (Persia)". Encyclopædia Britannica. Vol. I: A-Ak – Bayes (15th ed.). Chicago, IL: Encyclopædia Britannica, Inc. ISBN 978-1-59339-837-8. LCCN 2008934270.
- Jackson, Peter; Lockhart, Lawrence, eds. (1986). The Cambridge History of Iran. Vol. 6: The Timurid and Safavid Periods. Cambridge University Press. ISBN 0521200946. LCCN 67012845.
- Kacharava, Eka (2011). "The Alaverdy Eparchy". Friends of Academic Research in Georgia.
- Khanbaghi, Aptin (2006). The Fire, the Star and the Cross: Minority Religions in Medieval and Early Modern Iran. London: I.B. Tauris. ISBN 1-8451-1056-0. LCCN 2006296797.
- Kouymjian, Dickran (2004) [1997]. "1: Armenia From the Fall of the Cilician Kingdom (1375) to the Forced Emigration under Shah Abbas (1604)". In Hovannisian, Richard G. (ed.). The Armenian People from Ancient to Modern Times. Vol. II: Foreign Dominion to Statehood: The Fifteenth Century to the Twentieth Century. St. Martin's Press. ISBN 0312101686. LCCN 2004273378.
- Kremer, William (25 January 2013). "Why Did Men Stop Wearing High Heels?". BBC News Magazine. Archived from the original on 17 August 2014.
- Lapidus, Ira Marvin (2012). A Global History of Pre-modern Islamic Societies. Cambridge, UK: Cambridge University Press. ISBN 978-0-5217-3298-7. LCCN 2011043732.
- Lockhart, Lawrence (1953). "Persia as seen by the West". In Arberry, Arthur John (ed.). The Legacy of Persia. Clarendon Press. LCCN 53002314.
- Matthee, Rudolph P. (1999). The Politics of Trade in Safavid Iran: Silk for Silver, 1600–1730. Cambridge University Press. ISBN 0-5216-4131-4. LCCN 99012830.
- Matthee, Rudolph P. (2019). Persia in Crisis: Safavid Decline and the Fall of Isfahan. New York City: Taylor & Francis. ISBN 9781000392876. OCLC 1274244049.
- Mikaberidze, Alexander (2015). Historical Dictionary of Georgia (2nd ed.). Rowman & Littlefield. ISBN 9781442241459.
- Mitchell, Colin Paul (2009). The Practice of Politics in Safavid Iran: Power, Religion and Rhetoric. Persian Studies. London: I.B. Tauris. ISBN 978-0-8577-1588-3. LCCN 2010292168.
- Mitchell, Colin Paul, ed. (2011). New Perspectives on Safavid Iran: Empire and Society. Routledge. ISBN 978-0-4157-7462-8. LCCN 2010032352.
- Munshi, Eskandar Beg (1978) [1629]. Tārīkh-e 'Ālamārā-ye 'Abbāsī [History of Shah 'Abbas the Great (two volumes)]. Persian Heritage Series n.28 (in Arabic and English). Translated by Roger M. Savory. Westview Press. ISBN 0891582967. LCCN 78020663.
- Nahavandi, Houchang; Bomati, Yves (1998). Shah Abbas, Empereur de Perse: 1587–1629 (in French). Paris: Perrin. ISBN 9782262011314. LCCN 99161812.
- Necipogulu, Gulru; Roxburgh, David J. (July 2000). Muqarnas: An Annual on the Visual Culture of the Islamic World. Brill. ISBN 978-90-04-11669-6.
- Newman, Andrew J. (2006). Safavid Iran: Rebirth of a Persian Empire. Library of Middle East History. I.B. Tauris. ISBN 9781860646676.
- Quinn, Sholeh (2015). Shah Abbas: The King who Refashioned Iran. Oneworld Publications. ISBN 9781780745688.
- Rahimlu, Yusof (2015). "ʿAbbās I". In Madelung, Wilferd; Daftary, Farhad (eds.). Encyclopaedia Islamica Online. Brill Online. ISSN 1875-9831.
- Rayfield, Donald (2013). Edge of Empires: A History of Georgia. Reaktion Books. ISBN 9781780230306.
- Roemer, H. R. (1986). "5: The Safavid Period". In Jackson, Peter; Lockhart, Lawrence (eds.). The Cambridge History of Iran. Vol. 6: The Timurid and Safavid Periods. Cambridge, UK: Cambridge University Press. ISBN 0-5212-0094-6. LCCN 67012845.
- Saslow, James M. (1999). "Asia and Islam: Ancient Cultures, Modern Conflicts". Pictures and Passions: A History of Homosexuality in the Visual Arts. Viking. ISBN 0670859532. LCCN 99019960.
- Savory, Roger M. (1980). Iran Under the Safavids. Cambridge University Press. ISBN 9780521224833. LCCN 78073817.
- Savory, Roger M. (2012). "Ḥamza Mīrzā". The Encyclopaedia of Islam, Second Edition (12 vols.). Leiden: E. J. Brill.
- Shakespeare, William (1863). Clark, William George; Wright, William Aldis (eds.). The Works of William Shakespeare. Vol. III. Cambridge, UK: Macmillan and Company. LCCN 20000243. Archived from the original on 19 November 2015.
- Streusand, Douglas E. (2011). Islamic Gunpowder Empires: Ottomans, Safavids, and Mughals. Boulder, CO: Westview Press. ISBN 978-0-8133-1359-7. LCCN 2010024984.
- Suny, Ronald Grigor (1994). The Making of the Georgian Nation (2nd ed.). Indiana University Press. ISBN 9780253209153.
- Thorne, John O., ed. (1984). "Abbas I". Chambers Biographical Dictionary. Chambers. ISBN 0-550-18022-2. LCCN 2010367095.
- Uluç, Lâle (2013). "The representation of the execution of the Safavid Begum from the Ottoman Historian Mustafa Ali's Nusretname". 14th International Congress of Turkish Art Proceedings. Paris: Collège de France. pp. 799–820. ISBN 978-9751736970.
- Wallbank, Thomas Walter (1992) [1942]. Civilization Past & Present (7th ed.). New York, NY: HarperCollins. ISBN 0-6733-8867-0. LCCN 91025406.
- Wilson, Richard (March 2010). "'When Golden Time Convents': Twelfth Night and Shakespeare's Eastern Promise". Shakespeare. 6 (2). Routledge: 209–226. doi:10.1080/17450911003790331. ISSN 1745-0918. S2CID 191598902.

Abbas the Great Safavid dynasty Born: 27 January 1571 Died: 19 January 1629
Iranian royalty
Preceded by Mohammad Khodabanda	Shah of Iran; 1588–1629	Succeeded by Safi
