= Uzbek invasion of Khorasan (1578) =

Uzbeks invasion of Khorasan

Uzbek invasion to Khorasan
- Part of Persian–Uzbek wars
Date	1578
Location	Khorasan, Uzbek Persia border (Mashhad,Jam, Sarakhs, Abiward, Ashgabat)
Result	Safavid victory

Belligerents
Shaybanids	Safavids

Commanders and leaders
Jalal Khan Uzbek †	Mohammed Khodabanda; Mortaza Gholi Khan Parnak Turkaman; Ommat Beg Ustajlu

Strength
6,000–7,000	More than 3,000

The Uzbek invasion of Khorasan (Persian: حمله ازبک‌ها به خراسان) took place in 1578. Jalal khan Uzbek (governor of Merv) led the Uzbek troops. Tahmasp I guaranteed to pay 300 Tomans to the Uzbeks to convince them not to invade the bondmen and nomads of Khorasan. The tribute was not paid after Tahmasp I's death however, and Jalal khan Uzbek raided Khorasan. The battles of Jalal khan Uzbek and Mortaza Gholi Khan Parnak Turkaman were quite harsh. Jalal khan Uzbek's head was cut off and the Uzbeks pulled back to their territory.

== Battle ==
Jala Khan, with six or seven thousand Uzbeks from the Nàiman tribe, entered Khorasan from the areas of Nesa and Abiward, and advanced to Mashhad, intending to loot and plunder. The local emirs were not strong enough to oppose him alone, so they withdrew to their forts, waiting for one of the beglerbegs (Provincial governors) to organize a defense, at which point they would join the fight. After plundering Mashhad, Jala Khan moved on to Jam, and after raiding that area too, he planned to return via Sarakhs, driving the stolen livestock with him. Mortaza Gholi Khan Parnak Turkaman, the beglerbeg of Mashhad, sent messengers to the emirs under his command, calling them to arms. Knowing that Jala Khan’s goal was not to conquer land but to steal and that he was already heading back, Mortaza Gholi Khan Parnak Turkaman didn’t wait for reinforcements. Instead, he set out with his own troops and a detachment of Qurchi from Mashhad. When he reached Jam, he was joined by several emirs and local forces, totaling about three thousand men.

At Ashgabat, in the Jam province, Jalal Khan received word that Mortaza Gholi Khan and the Qizilbash army were approaching, so he stopped his advance. Some seasoned Uzbek elders advised Jalal Khan that, since they had come for a raid and weren’t ready for a full battle, they should secure the stolen cattle first. However, Jalal Khan, in his arrogance, dismissed the threat of the Qizilbash army and decided to fight. Both sides sounded their trumpets to signal the start of the battle, which raged from late afternoon until dusk. Jalal Khan, who had never faced a Qizilbash charge or seen their battle tactics, was amazed by the strength and discipline of the small force facing him and began to regret his choice. As the last rays of sunlight faded, both sides called off the fight, retreated to their camps, and stood guard overnight.
