= Indian Ocean trade =

Trade conducted through the Indian Ocean

Indian Ocean trade is vital for the global economy and has been described as the "cradle" for global trade. Traditionally connecting the western world to the eastern world since antiquity, long-distance maritime trade by South East Asian and South Asian, and Middle Eastern and later African ships has made it a dynamic zone of interaction between peoples, cultures, and civilizations stretching from Southeast Asia to East and Southeast Africa, and the East Mediterranean in the West, in prehistoric and early historic periods. Cities and states on the Indian Ocean rim focused on both the sea and the land. The ocean was historically called the "Mahodadhi", divided into the two seas Purvapayodhi (sunrise) and Apara (sunset). The Indian Ocean is critical for global trade and 50% of container traffic and 80% of global seaborne oil traverses the region.

The earliest long distance trade was by the sea-faring Austronesian peoples who settled in a vast swathe of coastal lands in the Indian Ocean from islands surrounding southern China such as Taiwan and Japan, to coastal areas of Maritime South East Asia, South Eastern India and Sri Lanka. These routes were later continued by South Asian, East Asian and European merchants such as the colonial trade routes of the Dutch East India Company. This trade continues into the modern era, with the region becoming a significant geopolitical asset competed for by China, India and other powers. The Indian Ocean has been described as the "cradle of globalisation.”

The Middle East has also been a major actor in the history of western Indian Ocean trade, connecting Africa with the Middle East and South Asia. Gulf ports have played a continuous role in connecting Europe to South Asia since the Hellenistic and Roman period. The disruption in the Middle East to the trade routes between Europe and India likely played a major role in the establishment of colonialism and the World Wars period in Europe, which can also be seen in the modern-era, such as disruption to shipping in the Red Sea and Strait of Hormuz in early 2026 due to the Middle East war, though conflicts are relatively rare in Indian Ocean outside West Asia and the Greater Middle East.

== Eastern Indian Ocean ==
=== Austronesian ===
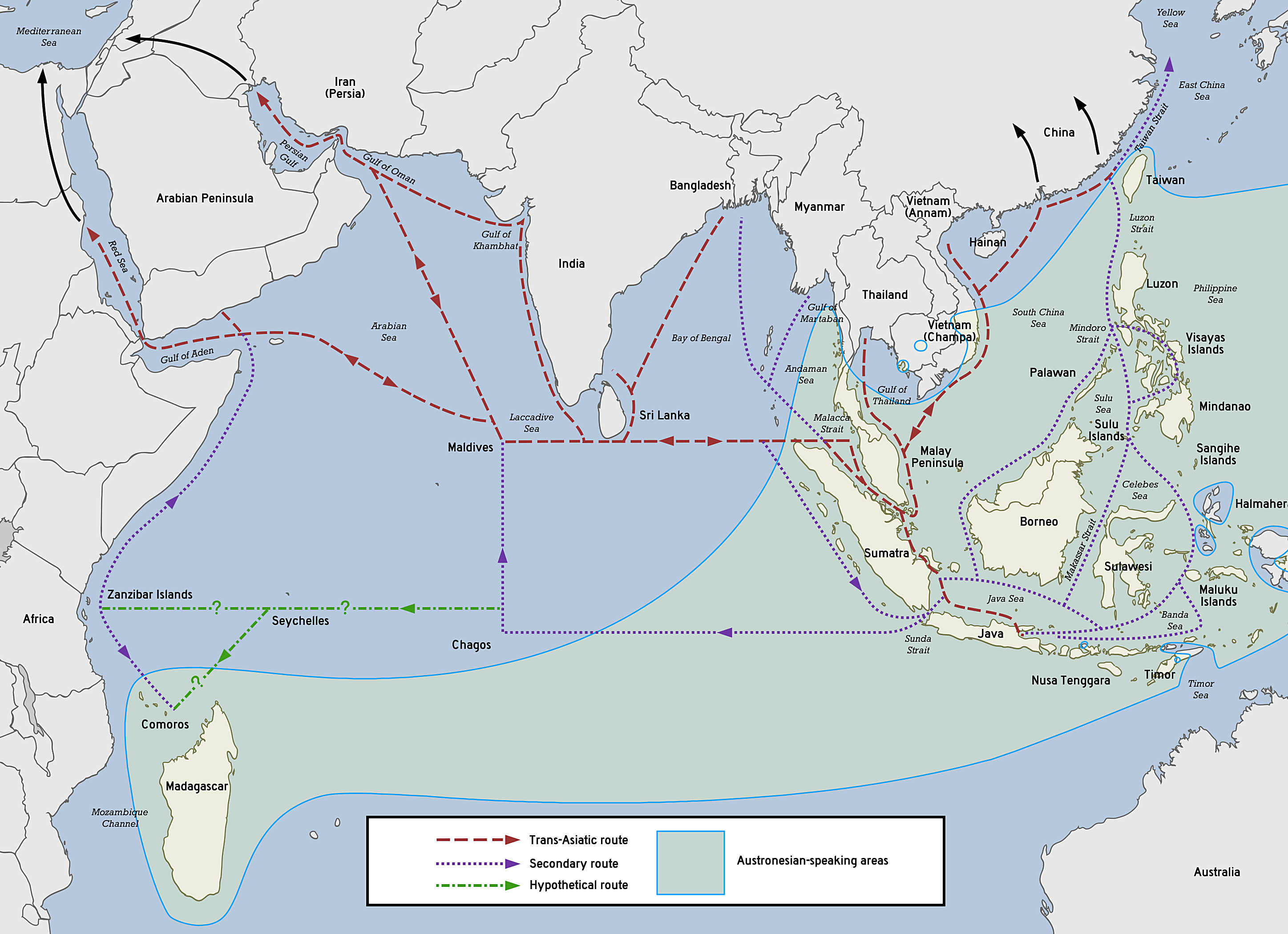
Austronesian proto-historic and historic maritime trade network in the Indian Ocean

The maritime trade network in the eastern Indian Ocean was run by the Austronesian peoples of Maritime Southeast Asia, with evidence supporting trade networks being established by at least 3000 BCE. They established trade routes between East Asia (China, Japan and the Philippines) and coastal South Asia (South Eastern India and Sri Lanka), ushering an exchange of material culture (like catamarans, outrigger boats, lashed-lug and sewn-plank boats, and paan) and cultigens (like coconuts, sandalwood, bananas, sugarcane, cloves, and nutmeg); as well as connecting the material cultures of India and China. Activity in Japan is shown in the Yayoi period (3rd century BCE) as evidenced by the discovery of Indo-Pacific beads.

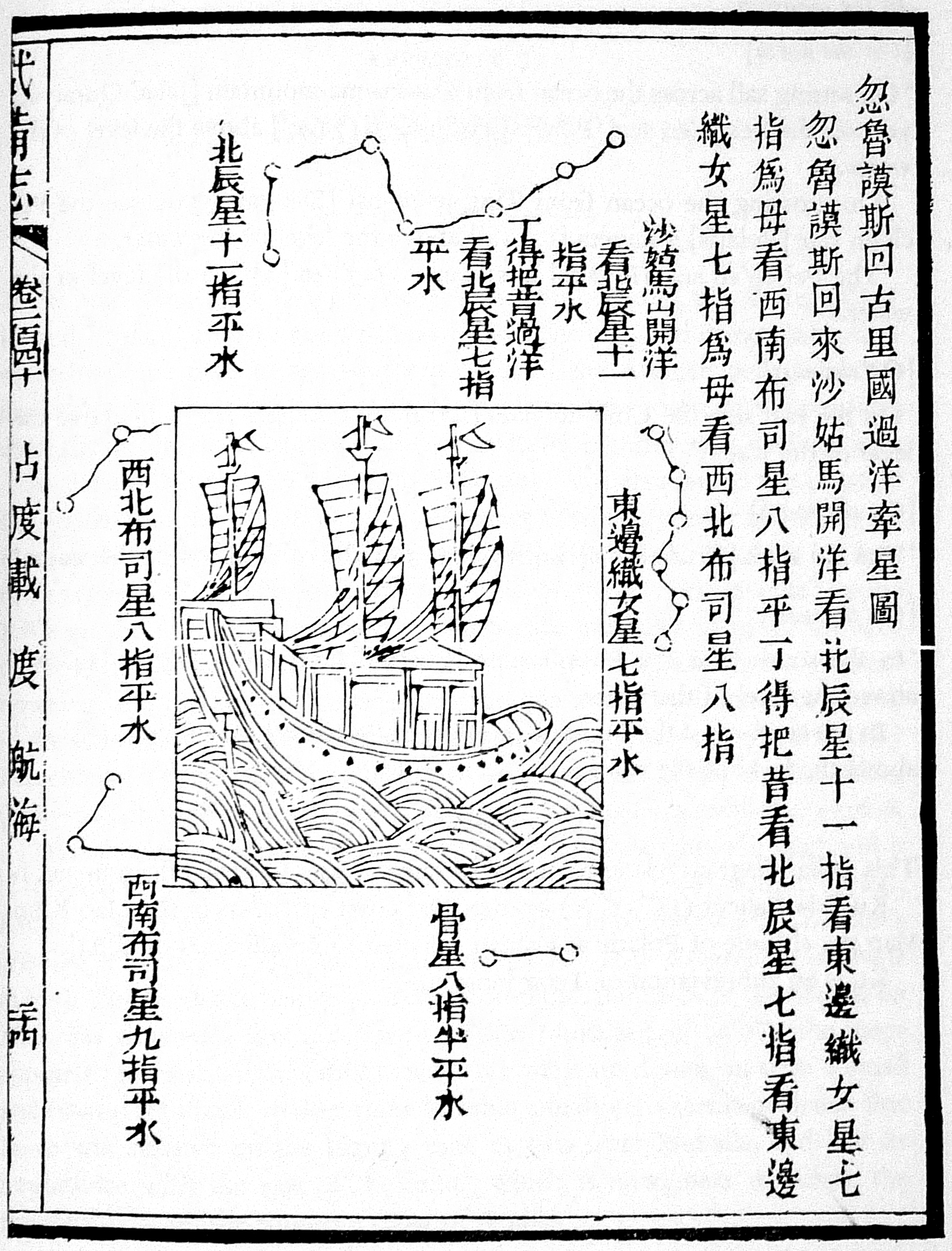
Part of Zheng He's navigation map providing instruction for aligning ship to travel from Hormuz to Calicut, 1430

This trade network possibly expanded to reach as far as Africa and the Arabian Peninsula, and also resulting in the Austronesian colonization of Madagascar by the first half of the first millennium AD. Spices (mainly cinnamon and cassia) were traded with East Africa using catamaran and outrigger boats and sailing with the help of the Westerlies in the Indian Ocean that likely passed through the Maldives and the Chagos Archipelago.

It continued up to historic times, later becoming the Maritime Silk Road and the European colonial trade routes East of the Suez. In modern days, the trade routes are still used between the Middle East and East Asia, through the major sea ports in Sri Lanka, Singapore and Indonesia to ship high value goods such as petroleum and Chinese wares.

=== Chinese travel ===
Chinese fleets under Zheng He crisscrossed the Indian Ocean during the early part of the 15th century. The missions were diplomatic rather than commercial, but many exchanges of gift and produces were made.

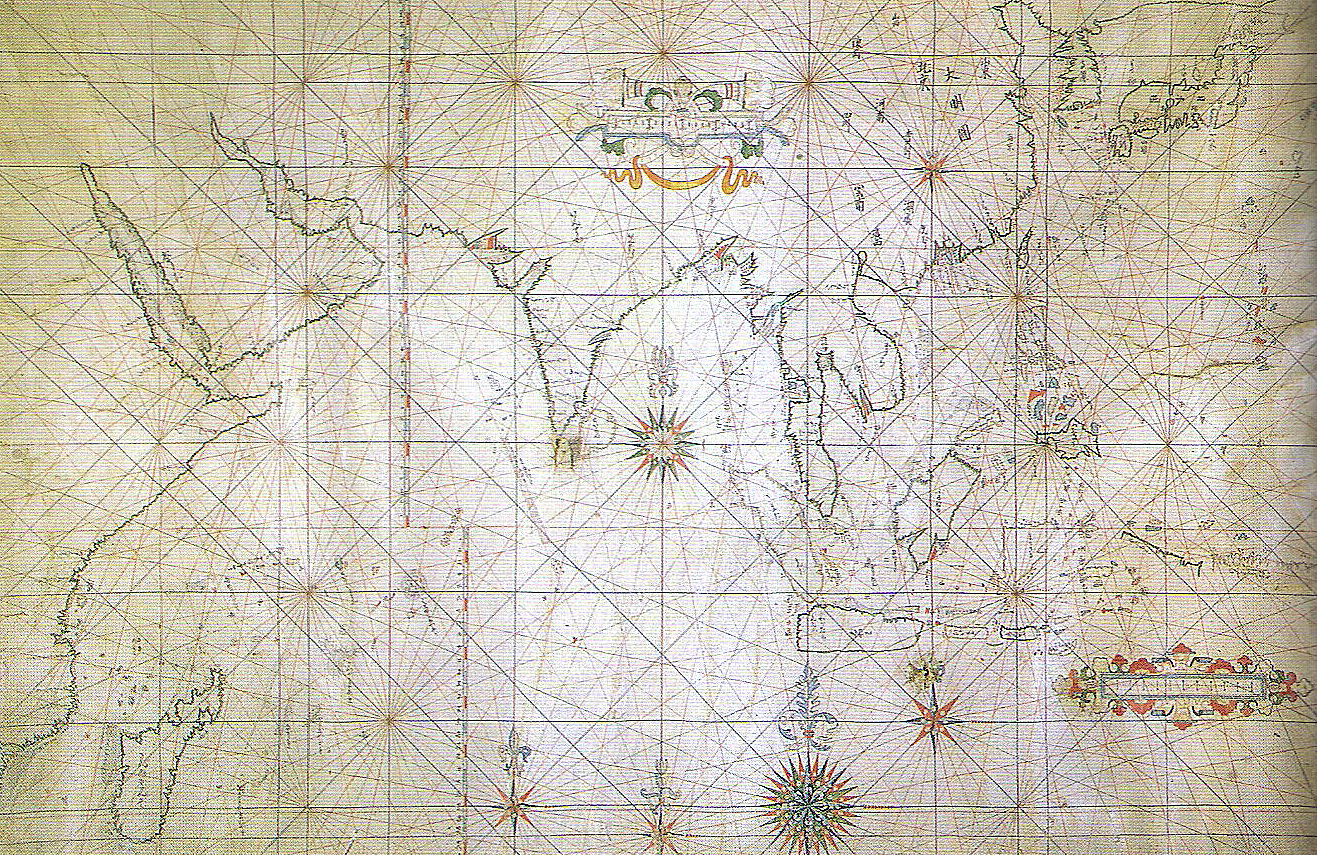
Japanese portolan sailing map, depicting the Indian Ocean and the East Asian coast, early 17th century.

=== Japanese trade ===
During the 16th and 17th century, Japanese ships also made forays into Indian Ocean trade through the Red Seal ship system.

=== Greater India Hindu-Buddhist period ===
The Satavahanas developed shipping ventures in Southeast Asia. The 8th century depiction of a wooden double outrigger and sailed Borobudur ship in ancient Java suggests that there were ancient trading links across the Indian Ocean between Indonesia and Madagascar and East Africa sometimes referred to as the 'Cinnamon Route.' The single or double outrigger is a typical feature of vessels of the seafaring Austronesians and the most likely vessel used for their voyages and exploration across Southeast Asia, Oceania, and Indian Ocean. During this period, between 7th to 13th century in Indonesian archipelago flourished the Srivijaya thalassocracy empire that rule the maritime trade network in maritime Southeast Asia and connecting India and China.

== Western Indian Ocean ==
=== Ancient Middle Eastern ===
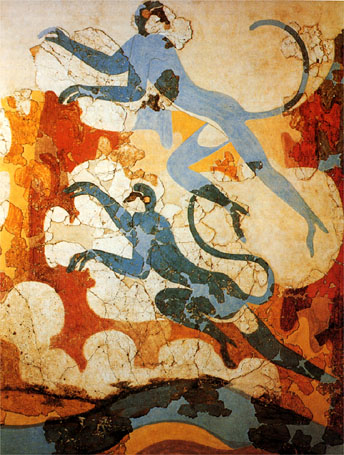
Monkeys with S-shaped tail depicted in 18th and 17th century BCE frescoes at Akrotiri on the Aegean island of Thera were recently identified as South Asian gray langurs

There was an extensive maritime trade network operating between the Harappan and Mesopotamian civilizations as early as the middle Harappan Phase (2600-1900 BCE), with much commerce being handled by "middlemen merchants from Dilmun" (modern Bahrain and Failaka located in the Persian Gulf). Such long-distance sea trade became feasible with the development of plank-built watercraft, equipped with a single central mast supporting a sail of woven rushes or cloth.

Several coastal settlements like Sotkagen-dor (astride Dasht River, north of Jiwani), Sokhta Koh (astride Shadi River, north of Pasni), and Balakot (near Sonmiani) in Pakistan along with Lothal in western India, testify to their role as Harappan trading outposts. Shallow harbours located at the estuaries of rivers opening into the sea allowed brisk maritime trade with Mesopotamian cities.

Recent archaeological study has highlighted the growing corpus of evidence supporting direct maritime contacts between bronze age Egypt and India via the Red Sea. Scholars such as Gregory Possehl have also proposed maritime activities between the Indus Valley Civilization and East Africa.

=== Hellenistic and Roman period ===
Roman trade with India according to the Periplus Maris Erythraei, 1st century CE.

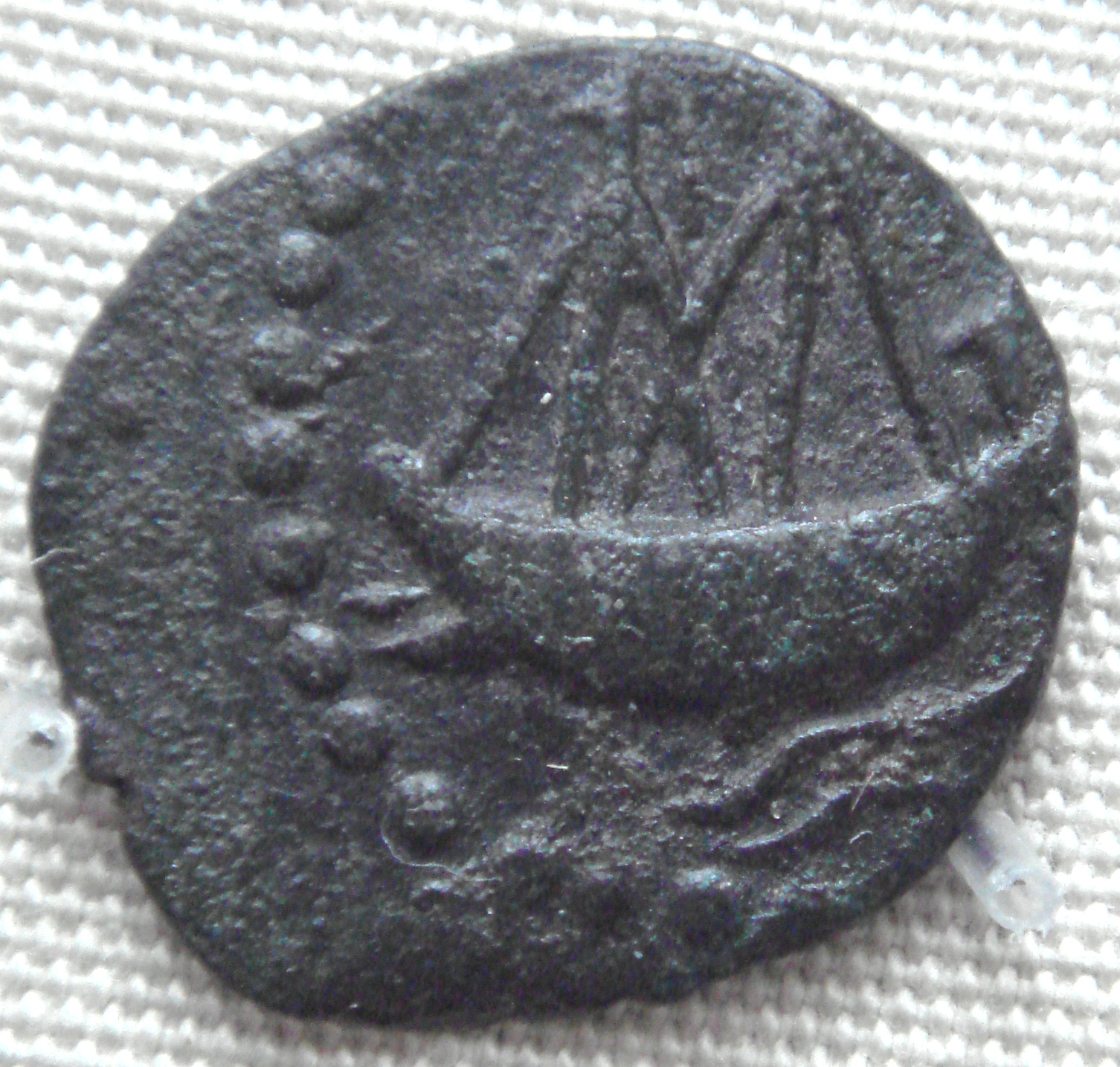
Indian ship on lead coin of Vasisthiputra Sri Pulamavi.

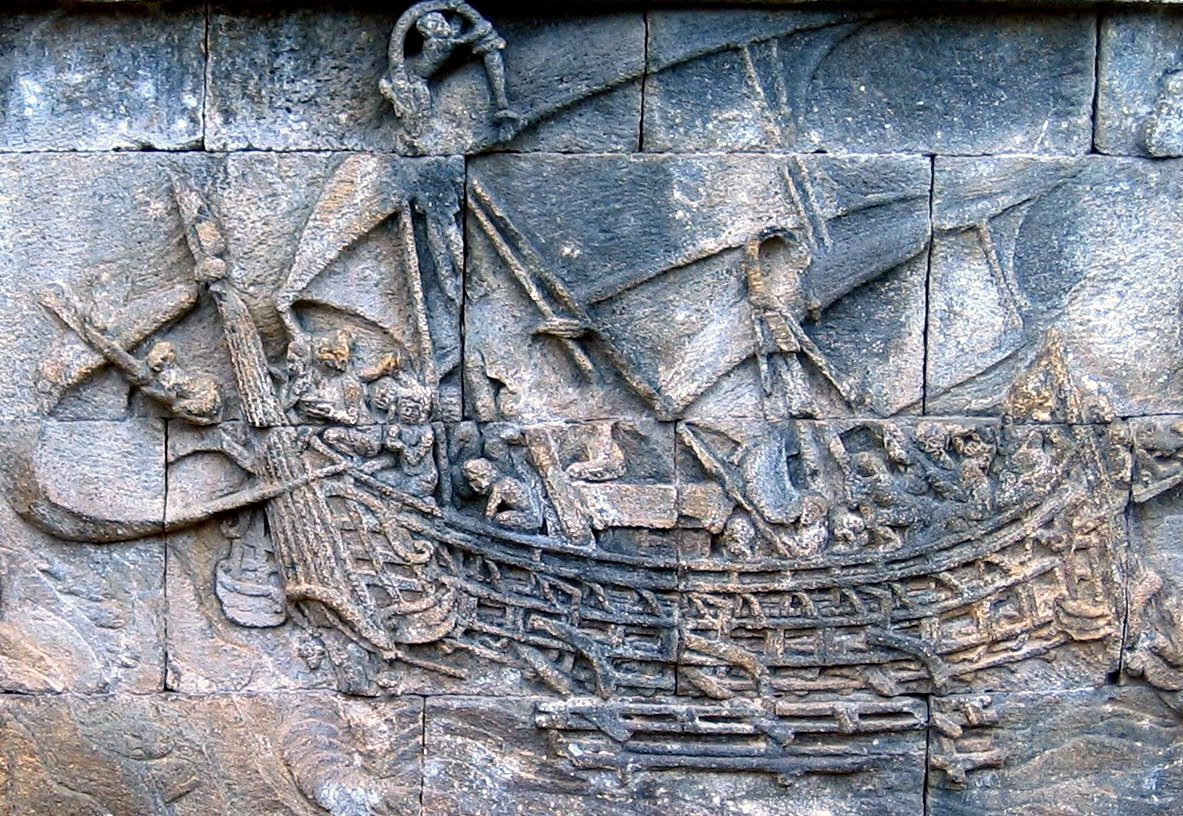
Relief panel of a ship at Borobudur, 8th–9th century.

Trade between India and the Greek Ptolemaic Kingdom was started by Eudoxus of Cyzicus in 130 BCE. From Egypt, goods could be sent on to ports throughout the Mediterranean. The Kingdom's opening of Red Sea ports and improved knowledge of the seasonal monsoons resulted in a substantial increase in trade.

The consolidation of the administration of the Mediterranean basin under the Roman Empire led to the strengthening of direct maritime trade with India and the elimination of the taxes extracted previously by the middlemen of various land-based trading routes. Trade between the Roman Empire and India peaked during the first two centuries of the Common Era, facilitated by the peace and prosperity that arose beginning with the reign of Roman Emperor Augustus (27 BCE – 14 CE) and ending with the Antonine plague.

According to Strabo:

At any rate, when Gallus was prefect of Egypt, I accompanied him and ascended the Nile as far as Syene and the frontiers of Kingdom of Aksum (Ethiopia), and I learned that as many as one hundred and twenty vessels were sailing from Myos Hormos to the subcontinent, whereas formerly, under the Ptolemies, only a very few ventured to undertake the voyage and to carry on traffic in Indian merchandise.

— Strabo

Strabo's mention of the vast increase in trade following the Roman annexation of Egypt indicates that the monsoon was known and utilized for trade in his time. So much gold was used for this trade, and apparently recycled by the Kushan Empire (Kushans) for their own coinage, that Pliny the Elder (NH VI.101) complained about the drain of specie to India:

==== Roman ports ====
The three main Roman ports involved with eastern trade were Arsinoe, Berenice and Myos Hormos. Arsinoe was one of the early trading centers but was soon overshadowed by the more easily accessible Myos Hormos and Berenice.

===== Arsinoe =====
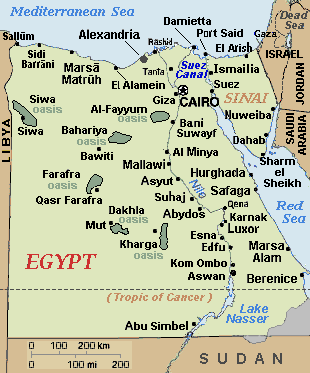
Sites of Egyptian Red Sea ports, including Alexandria and Berenice.

The Ptolemaic dynasty exploited the strategic position of Alexandria to secure trade with the subcontinent. The course of trade with the east then seems to have been first through the harbor of Arsinoe, the present day Suez. The goods from the East African trade were landed at one of the three main Roman ports, Arsinoe, Berenice or Myos Hormos. The Romans repaired and cleared out the silted up canal from the Nile to harbor center of Arsinoe on the Red Sea. This was one of the many efforts the Roman administration had to undertake to divert as much of the trade to the maritime routes as possible.

Arsinoe was eventually overshadowed by the rising prominence of Myos Hormos. The navigation to the northern ports, such as Arsinoe-Clysma, became difficult in comparison to Myos Hormos due to the northern winds in the Gulf of Suez. Venturing to these northern ports presented additional difficulties such as shoals, reefs and treacherous currents.

===== Myos Hormos and Berenice =====
Myos Hormos and Berenice appear to have been important ancient trading ports, possibly used by the Pharaonic traders of ancient Egypt and the Ptolemaic dynasty before falling into Roman control.

The site of Berenice, since its discovery by Belzoni (1818), has been equated with the ruins near Ras Banas in Southern Egypt. However, the precise location of Myos Hormos is disputed with the latig Abu Sha'ar and the accounts given in classical literature and satellite images indicating a probable identification with Quseir el-Quadim at the end of a fortified road from Koptos on the Nile. The Quseir el-Quadim site has further been associated with Myos Hormos following the excavations at el-Zerqa, halfway along the route, which have revealed ostraca leading to the conclusion that the port at the end of this road may have been Myos Hormos.

==== South Asian ports ====
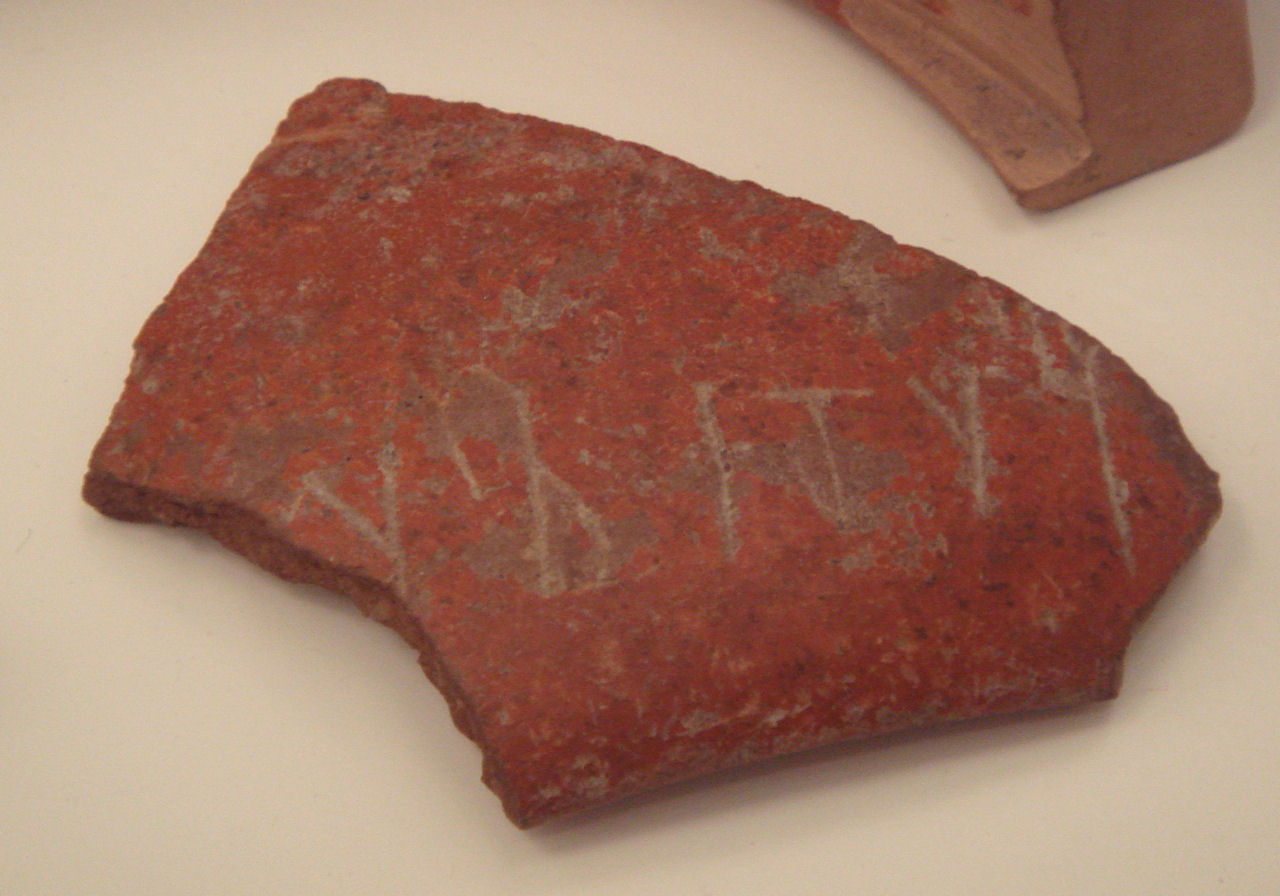
Roman piece of pottery from Arezzo, Latium, found at Virampatnam, Arikamedu (1st century CE). Musee Guimet.

The regional ports of Barbaricum (modern Karachi), Sounagoura (central Bangladesh) Barygaza, Muziris in Kerala, Korkai, Kaveripattinam and Arikamedu on the southern tip of present-day India were the main centers of this trade, along with Kodumanal, an inland city. The Periplus Maris Erythraei describes Greco-Roman merchants selling in Barbaricum "thin clothing, figured linens, topaz, coral, storax, frankincense, vessels of glass, silver and gold plate, and a little wine" in exchange for "costus, bdellium, lycium, nard, turquoise, lapis lazuli, Seric skins, cotton cloth, silk yarn, and indigo." In Barygaza, they would buy wheat, rice, sesame oil, cotton and cloth.

==== Barigaza ====
Trade with Barigaza, under the control of the Indo-Scythian Western Satrap Nahapana ("Nambanus"), was especially flourishing:

There are imported into this market-town (Barigaza), wine, Italian preferred, also Laodicean and Arabian; copper, tin, and lead; coral and topaz; thin clothing and inferior sorts of all kinds; bright-colored girdles a cubit wide; storax, sweet clover, flint glass, realgar, antimony, gold and silver coin, on which there is a profit when exchanged for the money of the country; and ointment, but not very costly and not much. And for the King there are brought into those places very costly vessels of silver, singing boys, beautiful maidens for the harem, fine wines, thin clothing of the finest weaves, and the choicest ointments. There are exported from these places spikenard, costus, bdellium, ivory, agate and carnelian, lycium, cotton cloth of all kinds, silk cloth, mallow cloth, yarn, long pepper and such other things as are brought here from the various market-towns. Those bound for this market-town from Egypt make the voyage favorably about the month of July, that is Epiphi.

— Periplus of the Erythraean Sea (paragraph 49).

==== Muziris ====
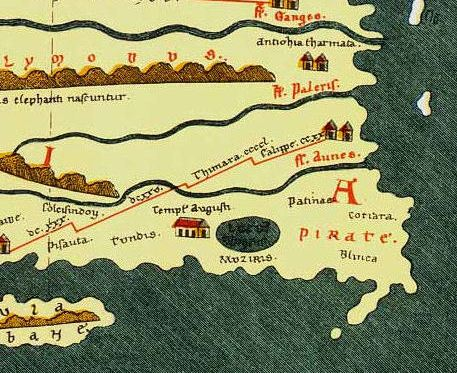
Muziris, as shown in the Tabula Peutingeriana, with a "Templum Augusti".

Muziris is a lost port city on the southwestern coast of India which was a major center of trade in the ancient Tamil land between the Chera kingdom and the Roman Empire. Its location is generally identified with modern-day Cranganore (central Kerala). Large hoards of coins and innumerable shards of amphorae found at the town of Pattanam (near Cranganore) have elicited recent archeological interest in finding a probable location of this port city.

According to the Periplus, numerous Greek seamen managed an intense trade with Muziris:

Then come Naura and Tyndis, the first markets of Damirica (Limyrike), and then Muziris and Nelcynda, which are now of leading importance. Tyndis is of the Kingdom of Cerobothra; it is a village in plain sight by the sea. Muziris, of the same Kingdom, abounds in ships sent there with cargoes from Arabia, and by the Greeks; it is located on a river, distant from Tyndis by river and sea five hundred stadia, and up the river from the shore twenty stadia"

— The Periplus of the Erythraean Sea (53–54)

==== Arikamedu ====
The Periplus Maris Erythraei mentions a marketplace named Poduke (ch. 60), which G.W.B. Huntingford identified as possibly being Arikamedu in Tamil Nadu, a centre of early Chola trade (now part of Ariyankuppam), about 3 kilometres (1.9 mi) from the modern Pondicherry. Huntingford further notes that Roman pottery was found at Arikamedu in 1937, and archeological excavations between 1944 and 1949 showed that it was "a trading station to which goods of Roman manufacture were imported during the first half of the 1st century AD".

==== Decline and legacy ====
Following the Roman-Persian Wars, the areas under the Roman Byzantine Empire were captured by Khosrow II of the Persian Sassanian Dynasty, but the Byzantine emperor Heraclius reconquered them (628). The Arabs, led by 'Amr ibn al-'As, crossed into Egypt in late 639 or early 640 CE. This advance marked the beginning of the Islamic conquest of Egypt and the fall of ports such as Alexandria, which used to secure trade with the Indian subcontinent by the Roman world since the Ptolemaic dynasty.

=== Muslim period ===
During the Muslim period, in which the Muslims had dominated the trade across the Indian Ocean, the Gujaratis were bringing spices from the Moluccas as well as silk from China, in exchange for manufactured items such as textiles, and then selling them to the Egyptians and Arabs. Calicut was the center of Indian pepper exports to the Red Sea and Europe at this time with Egyptian and Arab traders being particularly active.

Muslim missionaries and merchants began to spread Islam along the western shores of the Indian Ocean from the 8th century, if not earlier. A Swahili stone mosque dating to the 8th–15th centuries has been found in Shanga, Kenya. Trade across the Indian Ocean gradually introduced the Arabic script, and rice as a staple in Eastern Africa. Muslim merchants traded an estimated 1000 African slaves annually between 800 and 1700, a number that grew to c. 4000 during the 18th century, and 3700 during the period 1800–1870. Slave trade also occurred in the eastern Indian Ocean before the Dutch settled there around 1600 but the volume of this trade is unknown.

In Madagascar, merchants and slave traders from the Middle East (Shirazi Persians, Omani Arabs, Arabized Jews, accompanied by Bantus from southeast Africa) and from Asia (Gujaratis, Malays, Javanese, Bugis) were sometimes integrated within the indigenous Malagasy clans New waves of Austronesian migrants arrived in Madagascar at this time leaving behind a lasting cultural and genetic legacy.

== European colonial exploration period ==
=== Portuguese period ===
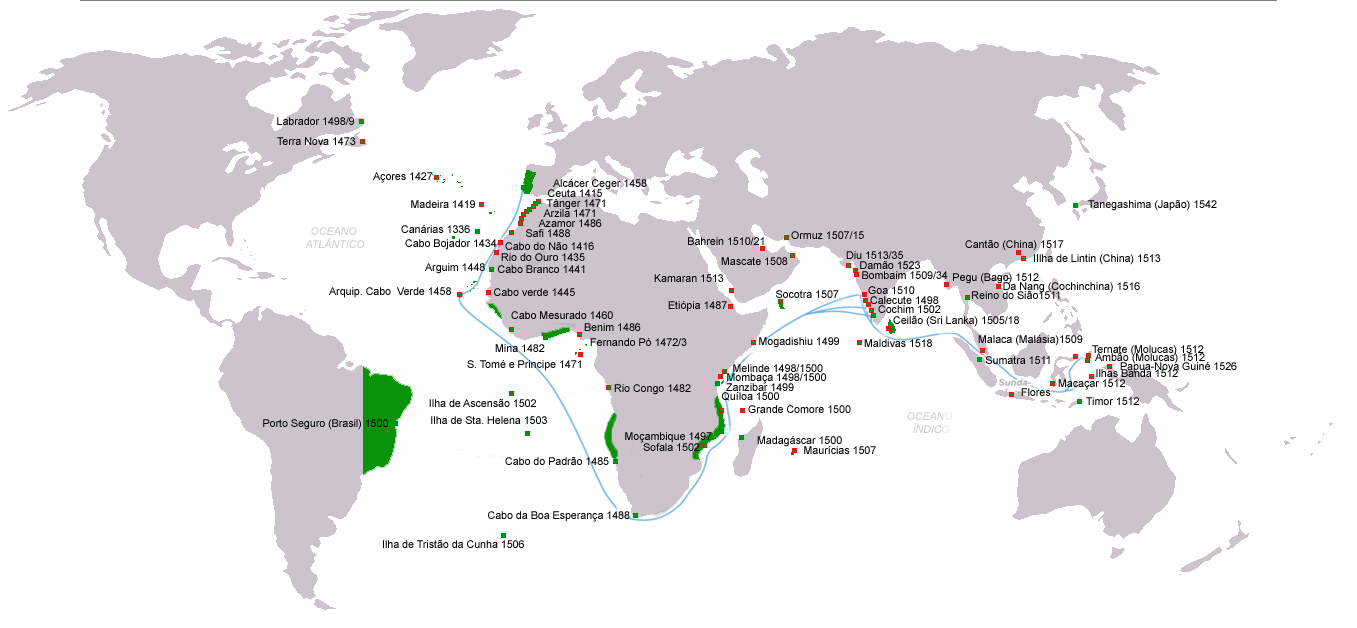
Portuguese discoveries and explorations: first arrival places and dates

The Portuguese under Vasco da Gama discovered a naval route to the Indian Ocean through the southern tip of Africa in 1497–98. Initially, the Portuguese were mainly active in Calicut, but the northern region of Gujarat was even more important for trade, and an essential intermediary in east–west trade.

European slave trade in the Indian Ocean began when Portugal established Estado da Índia in the early 16th century. From then until the 1830s, c. 200 slaves were exported from Mozambique annually and similar figures has been estimated for slaves brought from Asia to the Philippines during the Iberian Union (1580–1640).

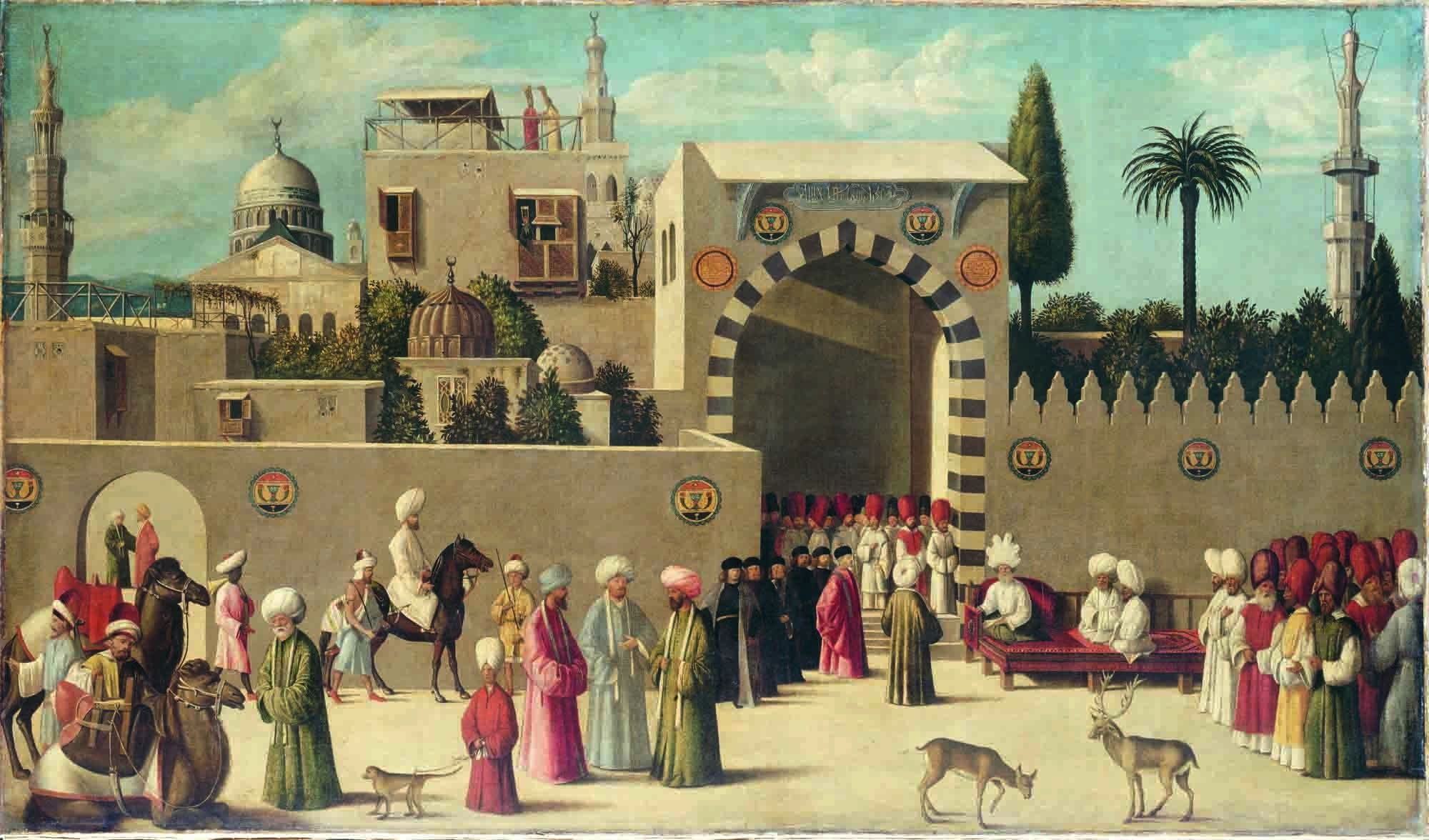
Reception of Venetian ambassadors in Damascus in the time of Qaitbay.

Venetian interests were directly threatened as the traditional trade patterns were eliminated and the Portuguese became able to undersell the Venetians in the spice trade in Europe. Venice broke diplomatic relations with Portugal and started to look at ways to counter its intervention in the Indian Ocean, sending an ambassador to the Egyptian court. Venice negotiated for Egyptian tariffs to be lowered to facilitate competition with the Portuguese, and suggested that "rapid and secret remedies" be taken against the Portuguese. The Mamluks sent a fleet in 1507 under Amir Husain Al-Kurdi, which would fight in the Battle of Chaul.

The Ottomans tried to challenge Portugal's hegemony in the Persian Gulf region by sending an armada against the Portuguese under Ali Bey in 1581. They were supported in this endeavor by the chiefs of several local principalities and port towns such as Muscat, Gwadar, and Pasni. However, the Portuguese successfully intercepted and destroyed the Ottoman Armada. Subsequently, the Portuguese attacked Gwadar and Pasni on the Mekran Coast and sacked them in retaliation for providing aid and comfort to the enemy.

=== Dutch and English period ===
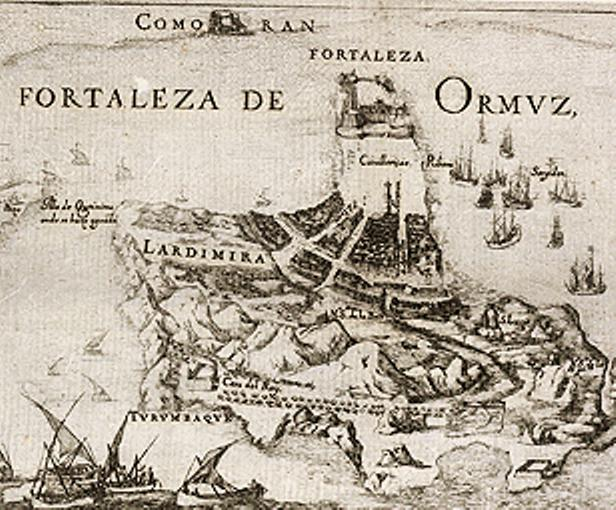
The island of Hormuz was captured by an Anglo-Persian force in the 1622 Capture of Ormuz.

During the 16th century the Portuguese had established bases in the Persian Gulf. In 1602, the Iranian army under the command of Imam-Quli Khan Undiladze managed to expel the Portuguese from Bahrain. In 1622, with the help of four English ships, Abbas retook Hormuz from the Portuguese in the capture of Ormuz. He replaced it as a trading centre with a new port, Bandar Abbas, nearby on the mainland, but it never became as successful.

The establishment of the Dutch East India Company in the early 17th century lead to a quick increase in volume of the slave trade in the region; there were perhaps up to 500,000 slaves in various Dutch colonies during the 17th and 18th centuries in the Indian Ocean. For example, some 4000 African slaves were used to build the Colombo fortress in Dutch Ceylon. Bali and neighbouring islands supplied regional networks with c. 100,000–150,000 slaves 1620–1830. Indian and Chinese slave traders supplied Dutch Indonesia with perhaps 25,000 slaves during 17th and 18th centuries.

The East India Company (EIC) was established during the same period and in 1622 one of its ships carried slaves from the Coromandel Coast to Dutch East Indies. The EIC mostly traded in African slaves but also some Asian slaves purchased from Indian, Indonesian and Chinese slave traders. The French established colonies on the islands of Réunion and Mauritius in 1721; by 1735 some 7,200 slaves populated the Mascarene Islands, a number which had reached 133,000 in 1807. The British captured the islands in 1810, however, and because the British had prohibited the slave trade in 1807 a system of clandestine slave trade developed to bring slaves to French planters on the islands; in all 336,000–388,000 slaves were deported to the Mascarane Islands from 1670 until 1848.

In all, Europeans traders deported 567,900–733,200 slaves within the Indian Ocean between 1500 and 1850, and almost that same number were deported from the Indian Ocean to the Americas during the same period. Slave trade in the Indian Ocean was, nevertheless, very limited compared to c. 12,000,000 slaves deported across the Atlantic.

== See also ==
- Ancient maritime history
- Chantal Radimilahy
- Greater India
- History of Indian influence on Southeast Asia
- Illegal drug trade in the Indian Ocean region
- Indian diaspora
  - South Asian diaspora
- Indianised kingdom
- Indianization of Southeast Asia
- Indian Maritime History
- Indian Ocean slave trade
- Indosphere
- Maritime Silk Road
- Tamil loanwords in Biblical Hebrew
- Winds in the Age of Sail

== Sources ==
- Allen, R. B. (2017). "Ending the history of silence: reconstructing European slave trading in the Indian Ocean" (PDF). Tempo. 23 (2): 294–313. doi:10.1590/tem-1980-542x2017v230206.
- LaViolette, A. (2008). "Swahili cosmopolitanism in Africa and the Indian Ocean world, AD 600–1500". Archaeologies. 4 (1): 24–49. doi:10.1007/s11759-008-9064-x. S2CID 128591857.
