= Safiqoli Khan Undiladze =

Safavid official of Georgian origin (d. 1632)

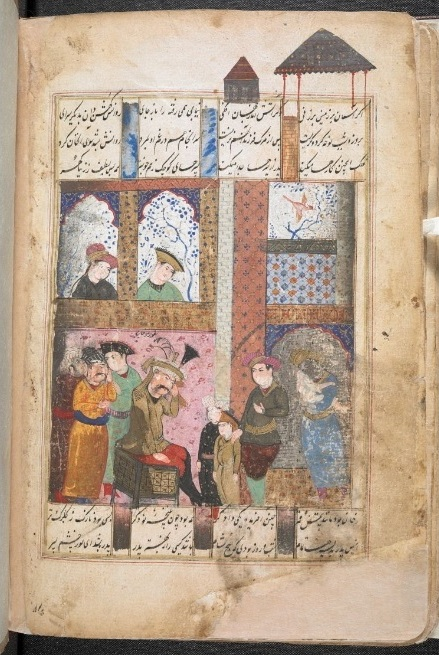
- Imam-Quli Khan taking leave of his sons before they were executed. From a Jarūnnāmeh by Qadrī. Isfahan style, dated 1697

Governor of Lar
- In office 1629–1630
- Monarch: Safi of Persia
- Preceded by: Khvajeh 'Abdol-Reza
- Succeeded by: Ebrahim Khan
- In office 1632–Unknown
- Monarch: Safi of Persia
- Preceded by: Ebrahim Khan
- Succeeded by: Kalb 'Ali Beg (Khan)

Personal details
- Died: 1632
- Parent: Imam-Quli Khan (father)
- Relatives: Allahverdi Khan (grandfather), Daud Khan Undiladze (uncle)
- Clan: Undiladze

Military service
- Allegiance: Safavid Iran

Safiqoli Khan also spelled Safi Qoli Khan (Persian: صفی قلی خان; died 1632) was a Safavid official of Georgian origin, who served as the governor (hakem) of Lar in 1629–1630 (1st tenure) and in 1632 (2nd tenure) during the reign of Shah Safi (r. 1629–1642).

A scion of the Undiladze clan, he was a son of Imam-Quli Khan and thus a grandson of the highly celebrated Safavid military commander and statesman Allahverdi Khan. In late 1632, during the widespread purges that were initiated by the order of Shah Safi himself, Safiqoli was executed along with his father and brother.

== Sources ==
- Floor, Willem M. (2008). Titles and Emoluments in Safavid Iran: A Third Manual of Safavid Administration, by Mirza Naqi Nasiri. Washington, DC: Mage Publishers. ISBN 978-1933823232.
- Maeda, Hirotake (2003). "On the Ethno-Social Background of Four Gholām Families from Georgia in Safavid Iran". Studia Iranica (32): 1–278.
- Matthee, Matthee (2012). Persia in Crisis: Safavid Decline and the Fall of Isfahan. I.B.Tauris. ISBN 978-1845117450.

Preceded by Khvajeh 'Abdol-Reza (Codgea Obdruzzy)	Governor of Lar (1st term); 1629–1630	Succeeded by Ebrahim Khan
Preceded by Ebrahim Khan	Governor of Lar (2nd term); 1632	Succeeded by Kalb 'Ali Beg (Khan)
