= Anglo-Persian capture of Hormuz =

1622 capture of Iranian island

Capture of Hormuz
- Part of Portuguese–Safavid War (1621–1630) and Anglo-Portuguese rivalry in the Persian Gulf
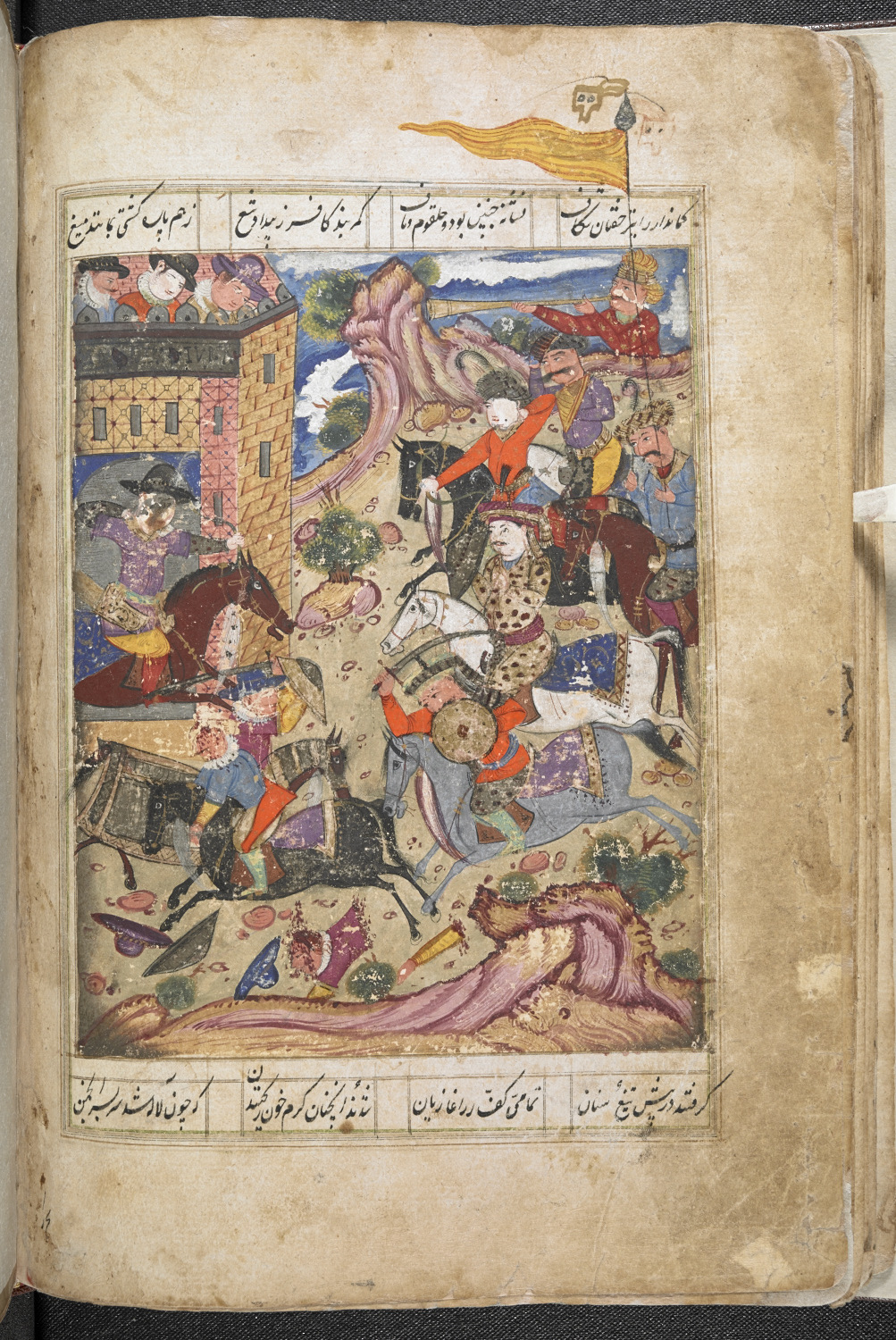
- The taking of Hormuz by Imam Quli Khan and his army (Latin inscription round the fortress). From a Jarūnnāmeh by Qadrī. Isfahan style, dated 1697.
Date	9 February – 23 April 1622
Location	Hormuz Island, Persian Gulf
Result	Anglo-Persian victory
Territorial changes	Disestablishment of Portuguese Hormuz

Belligerents
Safavid Iran; East India Company	(Portuguese Empire) Kingdom of Portugal

Commanders and leaders
(Safavid Iran) Abbas the Great (Safavid Iran) Imam Quli Khan; Captain Blythe	(Portuguese Empire) Simão de Melo

Strength
3,000; 5 warships 4 pinnaces	1,000

The Capture of Hormuz (Persian: بازپس گیری هرمز) was a combined Anglo-Persian expedition in 1622 that successfully captured the Portuguese fortress at Hormuz Island, thus opening up Persian trade with England in the Persian Gulf. Before the capture of Hormuz, the Portuguese had held the Castle of Hormuz for more than a century, since 1507 when Afonso de Albuquerque established it in the capture of Hormuz, giving them full control of the trade between India and Europe through the Persian Gulf. The capture of Hormuz transformed the balance of power and trade.

As England was not technically at war with Portugal (in the Iberian Union with Spain), news of Hormuz's capture resulted in political tensions between Spain and England.

== Background ==
After the Portuguese capture of Hormuz — first in 1507 and then with more success in 1515 — the Portuguese Empire established a monopoly in the Indian Ocean trade, becoming a great power in the Persian Gulf. This monopoly was aided by its near-simultaneous conquest of Qeshm, Bandar Abbas and Muscat (present-day Oman), which generated friction with the Safavid Empire (which initially saw the Portuguese as its allies against the Ottomans).

In turn, the commercial dominance of the Persian Gulf attracted the attention of England and Holland, rivals of the Iberian Union and who sought to challenge Spanish-Portuguese control in the region.

The accession of Shah Abbas the Great, saw a more aggressive Persian attitude towards the Portuguese with the Persian conquest of Bahrain, of the kingdom of Lara (Lar) and the mainland of Comoran (Bandar Abbas) in 1615. At the same time, a fortress was built in the inlet of Gwadar, halfway between Sindh and Hormuz, aiming to wrest control of trade in the area from the Portuguese.

During this period, Persian embassies were sent to Europe, and since the King of Spain, Philip III, was also the King of Portugal, the Persians tried to be friendly in order to develop a Spanish-Persian alliance against the Ottomans. Faced with this, some divergences arose between the Crown of Castile and the Council of Portugal, regarding how the foreign policy with Persia should be on the part of the Hispanic Monarchy, for which the Cortes of Castile accused a lack of realism to the Portuguese in their desire to insist on maintaining an Asian commercial monopoly that they could not impose on the rest of the European powers (while the Castilians sought a rapprochement with the English against the Dutch).

There was thus a clear divergence in the Persian Gulf between Portuguese priorities and Spanish priorities for the region: if the interests of the former were directed towards the Indian Ocean and Asia, Hormuz, due to its political and economic value, was fundamental for the maintenance of the State of India, Castilian interests were clearly oriented towards the Mediterranean, and Hormuz was important because it facilitated the approach to Persia.

— Graça Borges

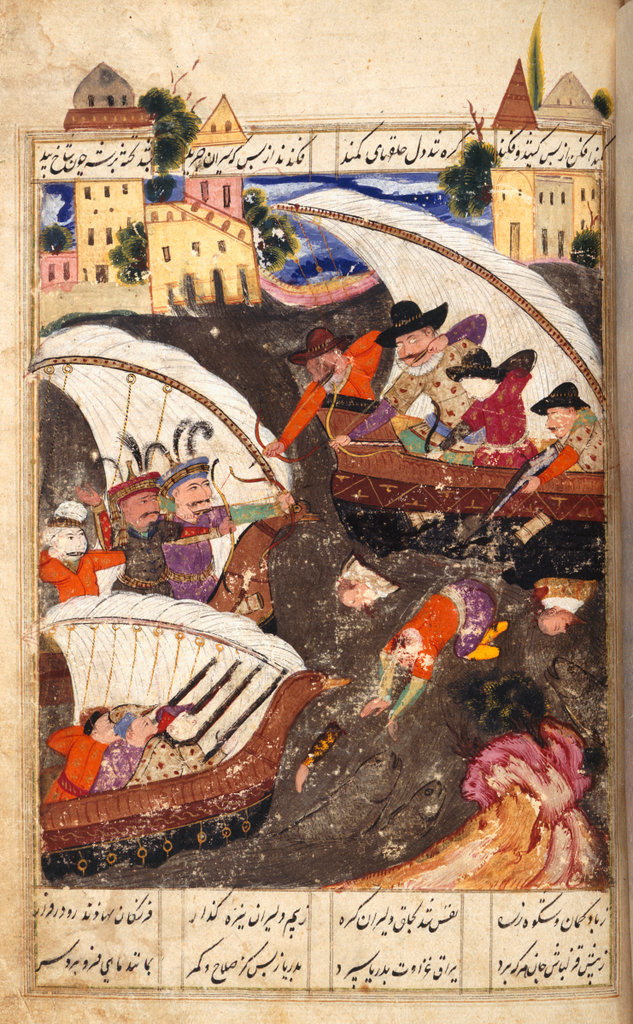
Imam Quli Khan's soldiers in boats repulsed by the Portuguese at Hormuz.

Despite internal tensions between the ministers of the Crown of Castile and the Crown of Portugal, the Junta of Persia was established at the end of 1618 (made up of 2 members, each, of the Council of Castile and the Council of Portugal, in total) to improve understanding between both Spanish kingdoms) to deal with the question of Hormuz, relating to: the defense of the Iberian possessions in the Persian Gulf against many threats (especially the English and Dutch), the expulsion of the English from the area (or at least to abandon their trade agreements with Persia) and how to treat the Shah's diplomatic relations along with his friendly proposals to grant the Spanish a commercial monopoly on Persian silk on the Cape route. Its purpose was conciliatory, although due to multiple misunderstandings and ambiguities (in addition to the fact that it was only consultative, while the final decisions were made by the Council of State), it only accentuated Persian warmongering.

Thus, ambassador García de Silva y Figueroa was sent with the public mission of developing an alliance between Spain (including Portugal) and Persia against the Ottoman Empire, although the real and secret mission was to ensure the commercial interests of the Portuguese colonies in the Persian Gulf, especially Hormuz. At the same time, friendly gestures were made with Persia, such as the acceptance of a trade agreement to export Persian silk through the Cape Route, although the Persians demanded that the Portuguese close the Red Sea to weaken the Ottomans, and then the Spanish requested the restitution of the Comoran fortress and that Bahrain be returned to the King of Hormuz (under Iberian protectorate). However, Spain did not have the capacity to launch an offensive against the Turks, and therefore, it only sought to buy time with the Persians by showing courtesy. Meanwhile, the Shah threatened that if the Hispanics rejected his good will, his trade offer would be handed over to the English with Robert Shirley. Finally, distrust of the English led to Rui Freire de Andrade being sent to reconquer and fortify the eastern part of the island of Quéixome to secure economic supplies from Hormuz and expel the English from the Persian Gulf. However, the English fleet was not destroyed and Shah Abbas became angry at what he considered an attack against his sovereignty, generating rapprochements between the Persians and the English against the Portuguese and Spanish.

=== Anglo-Persian alliance ===
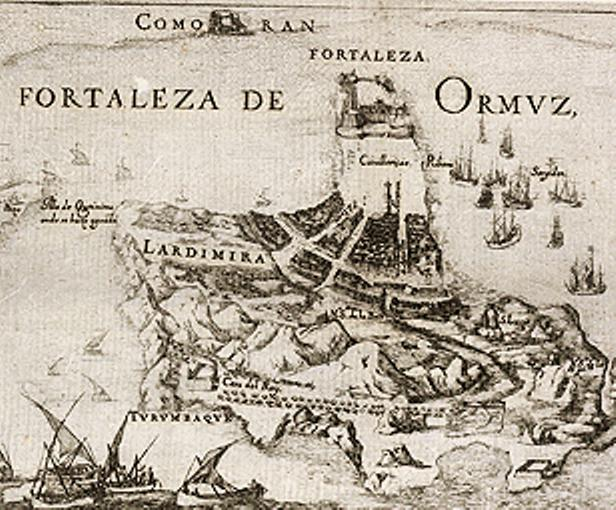
The city and fortress of Hormuz, 17th-century engraving.

The English component consisted of a force supplied by the East India Company consisting of five warships and four pinnaces. The Persians had recently gone to war with the Portuguese, and a Persian army was besieging the Portuguese fort on Kishm, but English assistance was required to capture Hormuz. Shah Abbas I wished to obtain English support against the Portuguese, and the commander Imam Quli Khan, son of Allahverdi Khan, negotiated with the English to obtain their support, promising the English that they would grant them access to the Persian silk trade. An agreement was signed, providing for the sharing of spoils and customs dues at Hormuz, the repatriations of prisoners according to their faith, and the payment by the Persians of half of the supply costs for the fleet.

== Operations ==
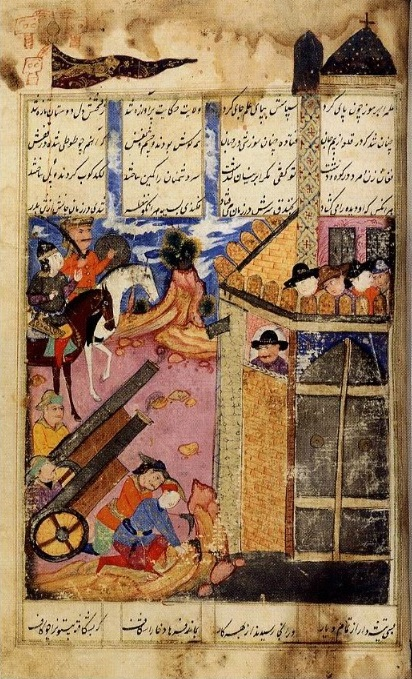
The Persians under Imam Quli Khan besieging the Portuguese in the fort at Hormuz. Jarūnnāmah by Qadrī. Isfahan, dated 1697.

The English fleet first went to Qeshm, some 24 kilometres (15 mi) away, to bombard a Portuguese position there. The Portuguese present quickly surrendered, and the English casualties were few, but included the famous explorer William Baffin.

The Anglo-Persian fleet then sailed to Hormuz and the Persians disembarked to capture the town. The English bombarded the castle and sank the Portuguese fleet present. After some resistance, the Portuguese garrison mutinied on 22 April 1622 and the fortress surrendered and was occupied the following day. The Portuguese were forced to retreat to another base at Muscat.

Although Portugal and Spain were in a dynastic union from 1580 to 1640, England and Portugal were not at war, and the Duke of Buckingham threatened to sue the company for the capture, but renounced his claim when he received the sum of 10,000 pounds, supposedly 10% of the proceedings of the capture of Hormuz. King James I also received the same sum from the company when he complained as such: "Did I deliver you from the complaint of the Spaniards, and do you return me nothing".

The capture of Hormuz gave the opportunity for the company to develop trade with Persia, attempting to trade English cloth and other commodities for silk, which did not become very profitable due to the lack of Persian interest and small quantity of English goods. The English soldier and merchant Robert Shirley also took an interest in developing the Anglo-Persian trade.

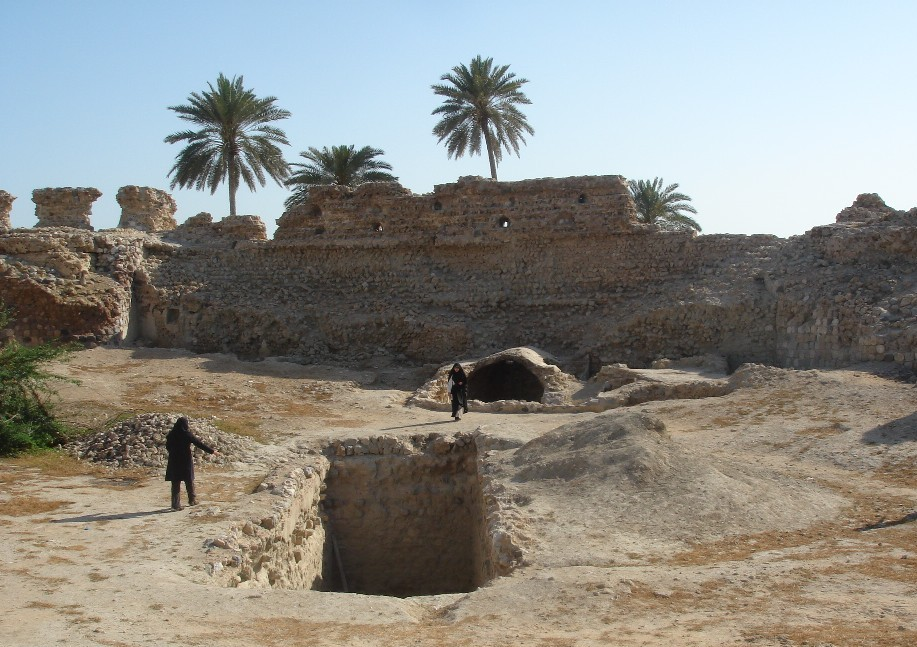
The Portuguese castle, Kishm Island

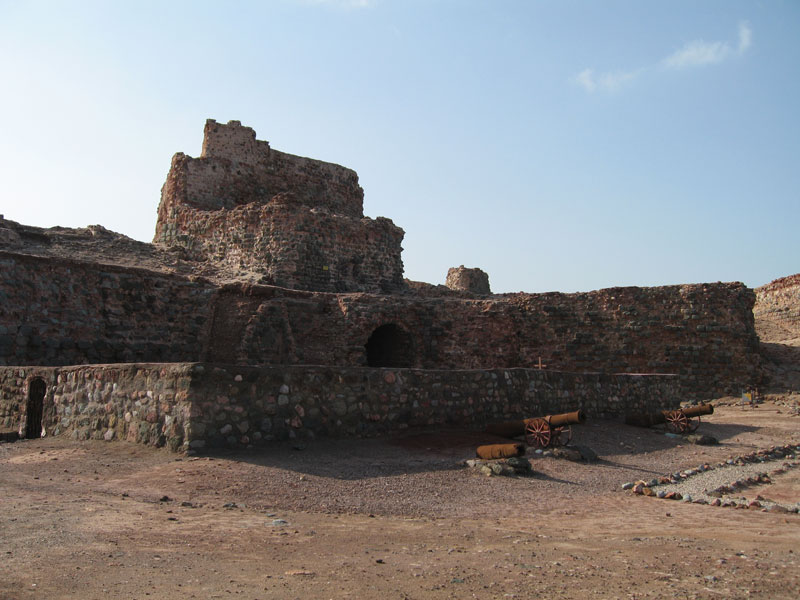
The Portuguese castle at Hormuz Island

== Aftermath ==
Following the loss of Hormuz, Portuguese forces, led by Rui Freire de Andrade, launched several attempts at military reconquest in 1623, 1624, 1625, and 1627, as well as a diplomatic attempt in 1631, but all failed. On the other hand, the Portuguese moved to Muscat (which became their new central base of operations in the Gulf), in turn establishing a trading post in Basra in 1623, at the mouth of the Euphrates River. That same year, Rui Freire de Andrade reconquered the Fort of Soar, which had been lost the previous year to the Persians, and transformed it into a new base of operations in Khasab (on the Musandam peninsula). Gaspar Leite also managed to conquer Quelba Fort in 1624, and Mateus de Seabra did the same with Mada Fort.

In 1625/1630, following the Battle of Hormuz (1625), the Portuguese signed a truce with the Persians, who allowed the Portuguese to establish a trading post and fortification at Bandar Kong, which is located on the coast of Iran. Then, in 1631, the Portuguese built the Julfar fort (but it would be lost in 1633), a strategic point of great importance on the Musandam peninsula, and which experienced a period of great prosperity during the Portuguese occupation, serving as a large warehouse of regional trade. The main character of the Luso-Persian war, Rui Freire de Andrade, died in September 1633, and was buried in the church of San Agustín (Muscat). After his death, peace treaties were concluded with the Persians and the English in 1635.

The Portuguese empire in the Persian Gulf would end up stabilizing again, despite the fall of the fortress of Hormuz. New fortifications and trading posts were founded, such as those of Soar, Julfar, Doba, Libédia, Mada, Corfação, Caçapo, Congo (Bandar Congo), and Basra.

=== Political impact ===
Within the Hispanic Monarchy, the event led to the Council of Portugal radicalizing its warlike stance having been influenced by the local governors and advisors opposing any attempt to develop an alliance between the Portuguese and English in the East Indies. In Madrid there was a desire to declare war on those who challenged the Portuguese monopoly in the Indian Ocean trade notably the English and the Dutch since the Portuguese feared that its reputation of their Empire would be tarnished among the natives of Asia. There was a fear that giving concessions to the "northern nations" would make the English to be more daring, with less respect for the power of the King of Spain. In addition, there was a concern that France and Poland-Lithuania would take advantage and also trade in India. This was perceived as serious damage to Portuguese trade and its monopoly based on the papal bulls of the Treaty of Tordesillas.

It is in no way fit for His Majesty's service, for the reputation of his greatness, for the good of that state [of India], nor for his entire monarchy, to admit any nation of Europe to trade in India.

— Letter sent from Lisbon to the Council of Portugal on February 28, 1623

However, after many discussions, and with Castilian pressure (who emphasized the impossibility of obtaining the resources and forces to fight the Protestant companies alone in the State of India), finally the Council of Portugal would come to consider an alliance with the English at the time. the evident logistical weakness being demonstrated, although declaring it as "forced and obligatory".

They [Lisbon councilors] are very considerate, and this council has always understood it that way, and would never admit the practice of friendship and alliance with any of the nations [of Europe] if it were considered feasible to contrast them all with power and forces of the crown of Portugal alone, which are so limited that even in the times when India flourished and had relations only with the natural kings [Asian governments], the victories and good successes that His Majesty's [Portuguese] vassals "The things they had in those parts were considered miraculous.

— Consultation of the Council of Portugal, Madrid, March 10, 1623

Although such rapprochement with the English was under the Portuguese condition that the economic damages for the loss of Hormuz be compensated (ideally, the English state was expected to send its ships to help recover Hormuz from what was an illegal act of the East India Company), something that, for the majority of ministers of the Spanish Council of State, was not worth requesting, since they saw it as unrealistic, in the words of Don Pedro de Toledo "Asking the King of England for things impossible for him would be of little effect to us", since it would not be possible to force the English to give up the vast commercial benefits they were receiving from the Persians.

No rapprochement with the English was achieved because the Thirty Years' War broke out and once again Spain and England were on opposite sides after the end of the Twelve Years' Truce. On the other hand, it was seen as condemnable and disloyal that the English had supported the Persians at a time when relations between Spain and England were trying to improve (largely because the Spanish Habsburgs wanted to solve their financial problems), at a time which Don Pedro de Toledo considered "of such friendship between the [Castilian and English] crowns." Spanish-English relations would only be ruined again after the failure of talks between both monarchies to consolidate an alliance through the marriage of Maria Ana of Spain (sister of Philip IV of Spain) with Prince Charles I of England, such failure reestablished the rivalry, although the events in the Persian Gulf contributed to souring relations between the Spanish and English empires.

In turn, during the Portuguese Restoration War, the Portuguese separatists saw the loss of Hormuz as an event with which to propagandize against the Spanish Monarchy, designing a rhetoric blaming all the failures of the Portuguese Empire in the Persian Gulf on the Castilian leadership, evading own responsibility. However, the documentation of the Spanish Council of State shows that the conflict was not treated negligently, but was in the constant interest of the Spanish, who dealt with a transnational geopolitics that integrated (rather than excluded) Portuguese overseas affairs, and for which Hormuz, despite its strategic importance, was not the center of interest of Spanish global politics (as if it were the balance with the Ottomans and having good relations with Persia), which is why the shipment of a Luso-Castilian navy to the Indian Ocean was denied, while being aware of more important matters in the Atlantic.

== See also ==
- Portuguese conquest of Hormuz
- British occupation of Bushehr
