= Verni =

Verni is a surname. Notable people with the surname include:

- D.D. Verni (born 1961), American heavy metal musician
- Marco Antonio Verni (born 1976), Chilean shot putter

== See also ==
- Verdi (name)
- Verini
