= Iranian Georgians =

Iranian residents who are ethnically Georgian

Iranian Georgians ირანის ქართველები گرجی‌های ایران
Total population
- 100,000+

Regions with significant populations
- Fereydan, Gilan, Mazandaran, Golestan, Khuzestan, Isfahan, Azerbaijan, Semnan, Khorasan, Tehran

Languages
- Persian, Georgian, Mazandarani, Gilaki, Dezfuli–Shushtari

Religion
- Shia Islam

Related ethnic groups
- Georgians, other Iranians

Iranian Georgians or Persian Georgians (Georgian: ირანის ქართველები; Persian: گرجی‌های ایران) are Iranian citizens who are ethnically Georgian. Present day Georgia was a subject of Iran in ancient times under the Achaemenid and Sassanian empires, spanning the Safavid and Qajar eras. Several Iranian rulers, such as Shah Abbas I, forcibly relocated hundreds of thousands of Georgian Christians and Jews. These measures were enacted to weaken the Qizilbash and promote economic growth. Many of them also migrated voluntarily, including the nobility as well as some that moved as muhajirs in the 19th century to Iran, following the Russian conquest of the Caucasus. The Georgian community of Fereydunshahr has retained its distinct Georgian identity to this day, despite Islamisation and adopting certain aspects of Iranian culture such as the Persian language.

== History ==
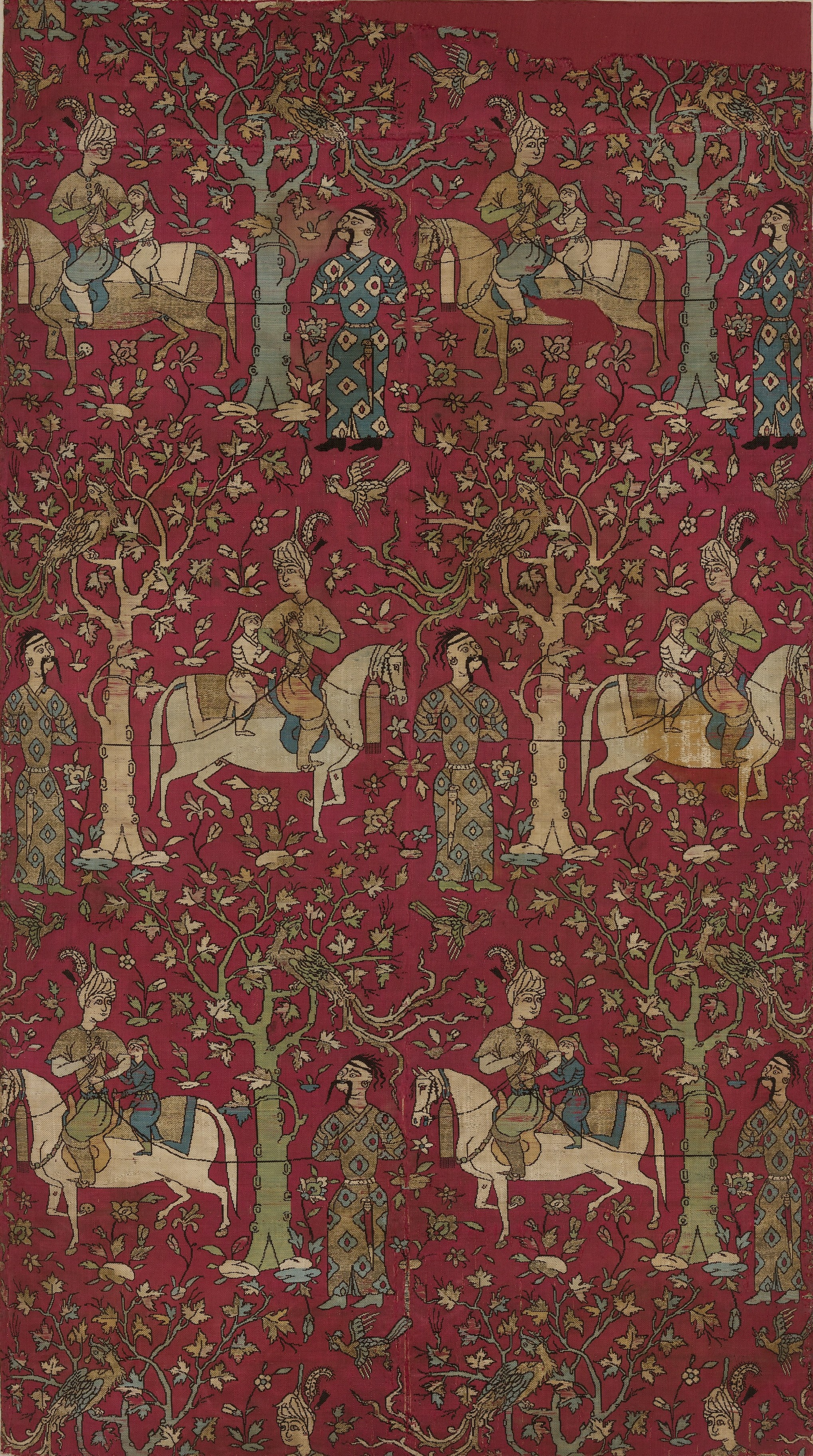
Safavid courtiers leading Georgian captives. A mid-16th century Persian textile panel from the Metropolitan Museum of Art.

=== Safavid era ===
The first extant community of Georgians within Iran was likely created following Tahmasp I's Kakhetian and Kartlian campaigns, in which he deported some 30,000 Georgians and other Caucasians back to mainland Safavid Iran. The first settled Georgian communities in Iran however appeared in the 1610s when Shah Abbas I relocated nearly two hundred thousand from their historical homelands in the eastern Georgian provinces of Kakheti and Kartli against Teimuraz I and Luarsab II respectively. Most of modern-day Iranian Georgians are the descendants of these deportees, although some can trace their heritage to the initial deportees under the reign of Tahmasp I.

Subsequent waves of large deportations after Abbas were ochestrated from the 17th till the 19th centuries by the Qajar dynasty. Some Georgians also migrated as muhajirs in the 19th century to Iran, following the Russian conquest of the Caucasus. The Georgian deportees were settled by the Shah's government into the scarcely populated lands which they quickly utilized as farming lands. Many of these new settlements were given Georgian names, reflecting the toponyms found in Georgia. During the Safavid era, Georgia became so politically and culturally intertwined with Iran that Georgians began replacing the Qizilbash among the Safavid officials, alongside the Circassians and Armenians.

Rostom (also known as Rustam Khan), viceroy of Kartli, eastern Georgia, from 1633 to 1658.

During his travels the Italian adventurer Pietro Della Valle claimed that there was no household in Persia without their own Georgian slaves, noticing the huge amounts of Georgians present everywhere in society. The later Safavid capital, Isfahan, was home to many Georgians. Many of the city's inhabitants were of Georgian, Circassian, and Dagestani descent. Engelbert Kaempfer, who was in Safavid Persia, estimated their number at 20,000.

Following an agreement between Shah Abbas I and his Georgian subject Teimuraz I of Kakheti ("Tahmuras Khan"), the latter submitted to Safavid rule in exchange for being allowed to rule as the region's wāli (governor) and for having his son serve as dāruḡa ("prefect") of Isfahan. The royal court in Isfahan had a great number of Georgian ḡolāms (military slaves) as well as Georgian women. Although they primarily spoke Persian or Turkic, their mother tongue was Georgian.

During the last days of the Safavid empire, rivals such as the Ottomans, Imperial Russia, and the tribal Afghans invaded Iran. The Iranian Georgian contribution in wars against the invading Afghans was crucial. Georgians fought in the Battle of Gulnabad, and in the battle of Fereydunshahr. In the latter battle they brought a humiliating defeat to the Afghan army.

In total, Persian sources mention that during the Safavid era 225,000 Georgians were settled in the Iranian mainland during the first two centuries, while Georgian sources keep this number at 245,000.

=== Afsharid era ===
During the Afsharid dynasty, 5,000 Georgian families were moved to the mainland according to the Persian sources, with the Georgian sources number the deportees at 30,000 people.

=== Qajar era ===
During the Qajar dynasty, the last Iranian empire that would have control over Georgia, 15,000 Georgians were moved to Iran according to the Persian sources, while the Georgian ones mention 22,000 people. This last large wave of Georgian movement and settlement towards mainland Iran happened as a result of the Battle of Krtsanisi in 1795.

=== Modern Iran ===
Despite their isolation from Georgia, many Georgians have preserved their language and some traditions, but have since embraced Islam. The ethnographer Lado Aghniashvili was first from Georgia to visit this community in 1890.

In the aftermath of World War I, the Georgian minority in Iran was caught in the pressures of the rising Cold War. In 1945, the Soviets earmarked them as well as other minorities in northern Iran as potential political turncoats. While the Soviet Georgian leadership wanted to repatriate them to Georgia, the central leadership preferred to keep them in Iran. However, any such plans of using them to foment revolution in Iran were foiled due to joint American and Iranian efforts against Soviet interference.

In June 2004, Georgian president Mikheil Saakashvili became the first Georgian politician to have visited the Iranian Georgian community in Fereydunshahr. Thousands of local Georgians gave the delegation a warm welcome, which included waving the newly adopted Georgian national flag with its five crosses. Saakashvili who stressed that the Iranian Georgians have historically played an important role in defending Iran put flowers on the graves of the Iranian Georgian dead who had died in Iran–Iraq War.

== Notable Georgians of Iran ==
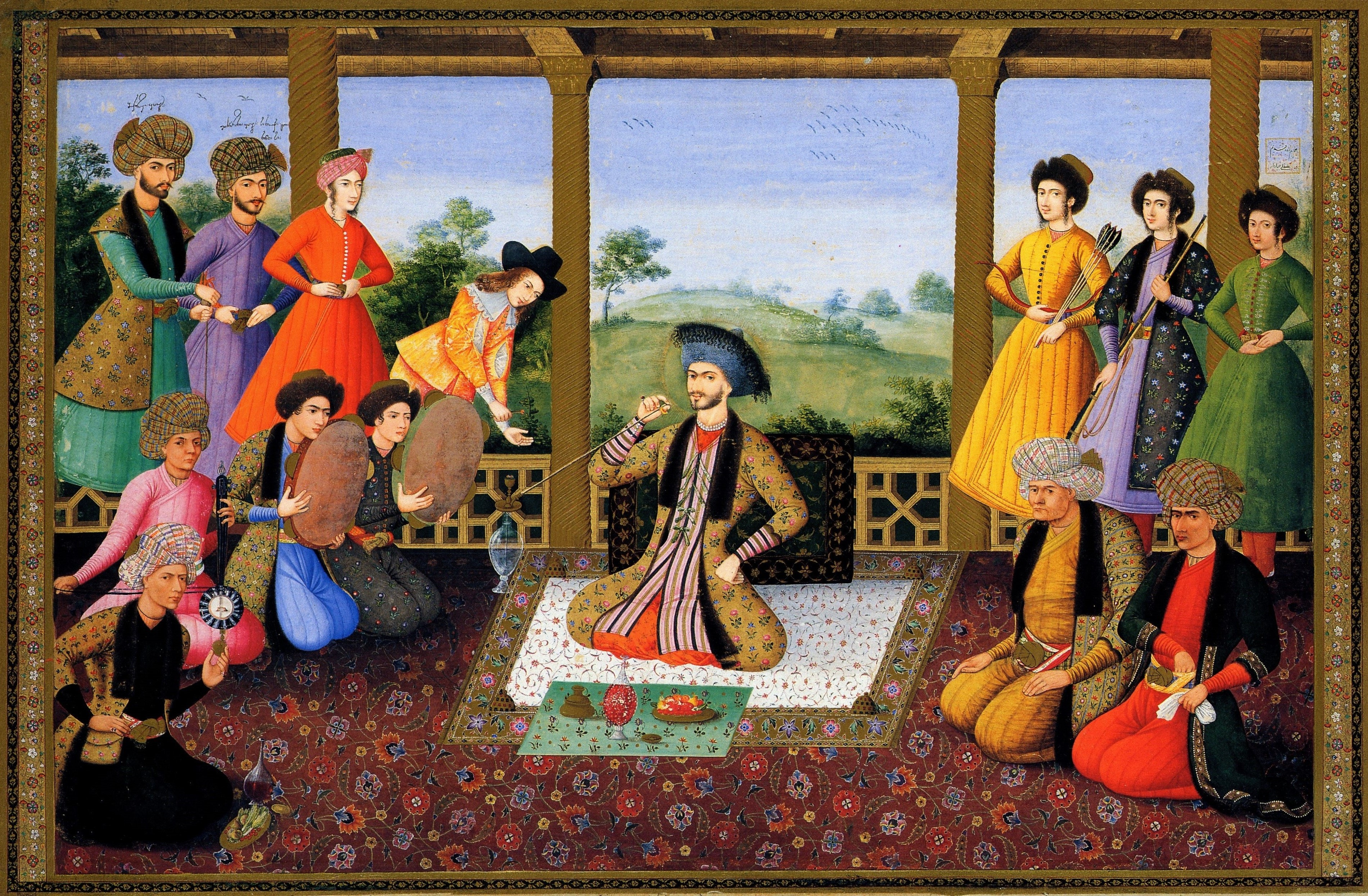
Shah Suleiman I and his courtiers, Isfahan, 1670. Painter is Aliquli Jabbadar, and is kept at The Saint Petersburg Institute of Oriental Studies in Russia, ever since it was acquired by Tsar Nicholas II. Note the Georgian letters at the top left.

Many Iranian military commanders and administrators were (Islamized) Georgians. Many members of the Safavid and Qajar dynasties and nobility had Georgian blood. In fact, the heavily mixed Safavid dynasty (1501-1736) was of partial Georgian origins from its very beginning.

=== List of Iranian Georgians ===
Military: Allahverdi Khan, Otar Beg, Rostam Khan (sepahsalar under Safi), Emamqoli Khan, Yusef Khan-e Gorji, Grigor Mikeladze, Konstantin Mikeladze, Daud Khan Undiladze, Rustam Khan the qullar-aqasi, Eskandar Mirza (d. 1711), Kaikhosro of Kartli, Shah-Quli Khan (Levan of Kartli), Eskandar Mirza (Prince Alexander of Georgia), Vsevolod Starosselsky

Arts: Aliquli Jabbadar, Antoin Sevruguin, André Sevruguin, Nima Yooshij, Siyâvush Beg Gorji, Ahmad Beg Gorji Aktar (fl. 1819) and his brother Mohammad-Baqer Beg "Nasati”,

Royalty/nobility: (Note: Most of the nobility and royalty of Georgian descent held numerous functions as officials and/or in the military, but are, for the sake of coherence and simplicity, virtually only included here in the list of "Royalty/nobility".) Bijan Beg Saakadze, Semayun Khan (Simon II of Kartli), Otar Beg, Anduqapar Amilakhvari, Pishkinid dynasty, Haydar Mirza Safavi, Safi of Persia, Mohammad-Ali Mirza Dowlatshah, Shah-Navaz Khan II/Gurgin Khan (George XI of Kartli), Imam Quli Khan (David II of Kakheti), Bagrat Khan (Bagrat VII), Constantine Khan (Constantine I of Kakheti), Mahmad-Quli Khan (Constantine II of Kakheti), Nazar-Ali Khan (Heraclius I of Kakheti), 'Isa Khan Gorji (Prince Jesse of Kakheti), Isa Khan (Jesse of Kakheti), Shah-Quli Khan (Prince Levan of Kartli), Manuchar II Jaqeli, Eskandar Mirza (Prince Aleksandre of Georgia), Shah Navaz (Vakhtang V of Kartli), Mustafa, fourth son of Tahmasp I, Heydar Ali, third son of Tahmasp I.

Academics: Parsadan Gorgijanidze, Jamshid Giunashvili, Mohammad-Taqi Bahar, Professor Leila Karimi

Politicians/officials: Shahverdi Khan (Georgian), Manuchehr Khan Gorji (Motamed-od-dowleh), Amin al-Sultan, Bahram Aryana, Vakhushti Khan Orbeliani, Ahmad ibn Nizam al-Mulk, Ishaq Beg (Alexander of Kartli, d. 1773), Bijan Beg (son of Rustam Khan the sipahsalar), 'Isa Khan Gorji, Otar Beg Orbeliani,

Others: Undiladze, Mahmoud Karimi Sibaki

The names of actors Cyrus Gorjestani and Sima Gorjestani, as well as the late Nematollah Gorji, suggest that they are/were (at least from the paternal side) of Georgian origin. Reza Shah Pahlavi's mother was a Georgian muhajir, who most likely came to mainland Persia after Persia was forced to cede all of its territories in the Caucasus following the Russo-Persian Wars several decades prior to Reza Shah's birth.

For a more lengthy discussion on Georgians and Persia refer to.

== Geographic distribution, language and culture ==
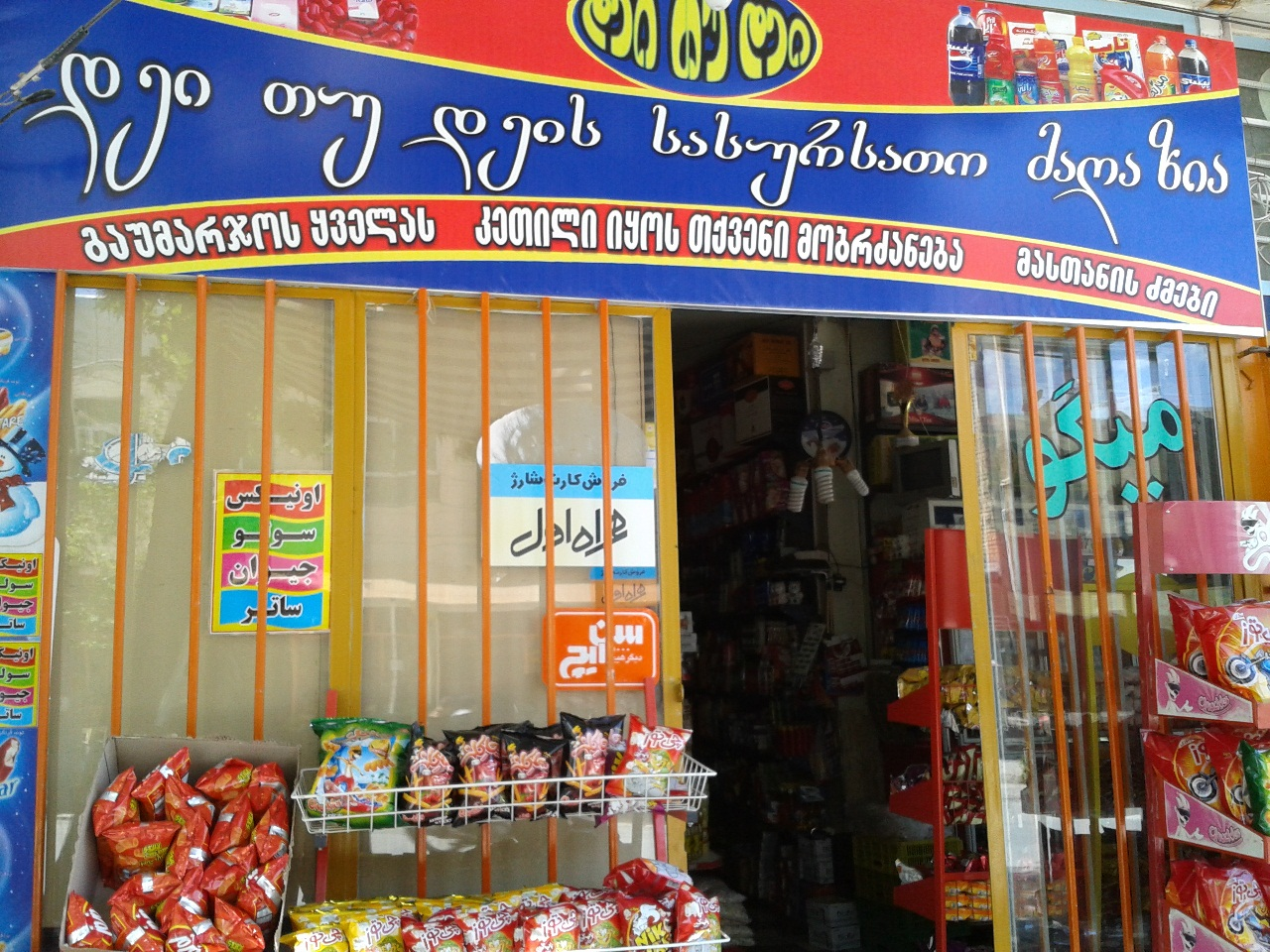
A shop in Fereydunshahr with Georgian signage

The Georgian language is still used by a minority of people in Iran. The center of Georgians in Iran is Fereydunshahr, a small city, 150 km to the west of Isfahan in the area historically known as Fereydan. In this area there are 10 Georgian towns and villages around Fereydunshahr. In this region the old Georgian identity is retained the best compared to other places in Iran, and most people speak and understand the Georgian language there.

There were other compact settlements in Khorasan at Abbas Abad (half-way between Shahrud and Sabzevar where there remained only one old woman who remembered Georgian in 1934), Mazandaran at Behshahr and Farah Abad, Gilan, Isfahan Province at Najafabad, Badrud, Rahmatabad, Yazdanshahr and Amir Abad. These areas are frequently called Gorji Mahalleh ("Georgian neighborhood"). Many Georgians or Iranians of partial Georgian descent are also scattered in major Iranian cities, such as Tehran, Isfahan, Rasht, Dezful, Karaj and Shiraz. Most of these communities no longer speak the Georgian language, but retain aspects of Georgian culture and keep a Georgian conscious. Some argue that Iranian Georgians retain remnants of Christian traditions, but there is no evidence for this. Most Georgians in Fereydunshahr and Fereydan speak and understand Georgian. Iranian Georgians observe the Shia traditions and also non-religious traditions similar to other people in Iran. They observe the traditions of Nowruz.

The local self-designation of Georgians in Iran, like the rest of the Georgians over the world is Kartveli (Georgian: ქართველი, from Kartvelebi, Georgian: ქართველები, namely Georgians), although occasionally the ethnonyms Gorj, Gorji, or even Gurj-i (from Persian "Gorji" which means Georgian). They call their language Kartuli (Georgian: ქართული). As Rezvani states, this is not surprising given that all other Georgian dialects in Iran are extinct.

The number of Georgians in Iran is estimated to be over 100,000. According to Encyclopaedia Georgiana (1986) some 12,000–14,000 lived in rural Fereydan c. 1896, and a more recent estimation cited by Rezvani (published 2009, written in 2008) states that there may be more than 61,000 Georgians in Fereydan. Modern-day estimations regarding the number of Iranian Georgians are that they compose over 100,000. They are also the largest Caucasus-derived group in the nation, ahead of the Circassians.

== See also ==
- Georgia–Iran relations
- Georgia–Persia relations
- Islam in Georgia
- Georgian diaspora
- Georgians in Turkey
- Kakhetians
- Abbas I's Kakhetian and Kartlian campaigns
- List of Georgians
- Circassians in Iran
- Khudsiani

== Sources ==
- Fisher, William Bayne; Avery, P.; Hambly, G. R. G; Melville, C. (1991). The Cambridge History of Iran. Vol. 7. Cambridge: Cambridge University Press. ISBN 0521200954.
- Matthee, Rudi (2012). Persia in Crisis: Safavid Decline and the Fall of Isfahan. I.B.Tauris. ISBN 978-1845117450.
- Mikaberidze, Alexander (2015). Historical Dictionary of Georgia (2 ed.). Rowman & Littlefield. ISBN 978-1442241466.
- Muliani, S. (2001) Jâygâhe Gorjihâ dar Târix va Farhang va Tamaddone Irân (The Georgians’ Position in Iranian History and Civilization). Esfahan: Yekta Publication. ISBN 978-964-7016-26-1. (in Persian)
- Rahimi, M. M. (2001) Gorjihâye Irân: Fereydunšahr (The Georgians of Iran; Fereydunshahr). Esfahan: Yekta Publication. ISBN 978-964-7016-11-7. (in Persian)
- Sepiani, M. (1980) Irâniyâne Gorji (Georgian Iranians). Esfahan: Arash Publication. (in Persian)
- Rezvani, B. (2008) "The Islamization and Ethnogenesis of the Fereydani Georgians". Nationalities Papers 36 (4): 593-623. doi:10.1080/00905990802230597
- Oberling, Pierre (1963). "Georgians and Circassians in Iran". Studia Caucasica (1): 127-143
- Saakashvili visited Fereydunshahr and put flowers on the graves of the Iranian Georgian martyrs' graves, showing respect towards this community Iran Newspaper (in Persian)
