= Jafarqoli Khan =

Safavid official of Georgian origin, 1600s

Governor of Astarabad
- In office 1664/1666–Unknown
- Monarch: Abbas II
- Preceded by: Jamshid Khan
- Succeeded by: Mohammad Khan

Personal details
- Parent(s): Unnamed daughter of Imam-Quli Khan (mother), Dāvūd (father)
- Relatives: Imam-Quli Khan (grandfather), Allahverdi Khan (great-grandfather), Daud Khan Undiladze (great-uncle)
- Clan: Undiladze

Military service
- Allegiance: Safavid Iran

Jafarqoli Khan, also known as Jafarqoli Beg, was a Safavid official of Georgian origin who served as the governor (beglarbeg) of Astarabad in 1664 or 1666, during the reign of king Abbas II (1642-1666). A scion of the Undiladze clan, Jafarqoli Khan was a grandson of the celebrated Safavid military and political leader Imam-Quli Khan, a son by one of his daughters and her husband Dāvūd (sometime governor of Dashtestan). Though the Undiladze family had almost been annihilated in its entirety in the early years of king Safi's reign (1629-1642), the succession of the family amongst the Safavid court elites was assured by Jafarqoli.

== Sources ==
- Floor, Willem M. (2008). Titles and Emoluments in Safavid Iran: A Third Manual of Safavid Administration, by Mirza Naqi Nasiri. Washington, DC: Mage Publishers. p. 153. ISBN 978-1933823232.
- Maeda, Hirotake (2003). "On the Ethno-Social Background of Four Gholām Families from Georgia in Safavid Iran". Studia Iranica (32): 262, 272.

Preceded by Jamshid Khan	Governor of Astarabad; 1664 or 1666	Succeeded by Mohammad Khan
