= Capture of Cambarão =

1614 Persian victory over the Portuguese

- Part of Safavid–Portuguese conflicts
Date	29 September – 21 December 1614
Location	Bandar Abbas
Result	Safavid Victory

Belligerents
Safavid Iran	Portugal

Commanders and leaders
Imam Quli Khan	Andreu de Quadros (surrendered)

Strength
14,000 men	80 Portuguese + Unknown number of native Auxiliaries

Casualties and losses
Unknown	Unknown

In 1614, the Persian army led by Imam Quli Khan conquered the Portuguese fort of Cambarão (modern-day Bandar Abbas).

== Capture ==
In 1613, several Arab merchants from one of the smaller ports on the Persian Gulf were mistreated by the Portuguese governor of Hormuz Island, Luis da Gama. These merchants were seized in a neighborhood of Hormuz without Cartaz. In another incident during the spring and summer of 1614, several caravans on their way through Persia to Hormuz were stopped. These actions triggered the Persians to attack the Portuguese.

Having refused to pay custom duties to the ruler of Lar whose territories belonged to Shah Abbas, Abbas dispatched an army of 14,000 men led by Imam Quli Khan against the Portuguese fortress of Cambarão. The Portuguese garrison was led by Andreu de Quadros; the garrison had 80 Portuguese and an unknown number of native auxiliary soldiers, which were few, and the fort was ill-supplied with guns.

After a weak resistance, Andreu surrendered to the Persians, and shortly after its capture, Michael de Sousa Pimental arrived with nine vessels that had been sent by the Viceroy of India to its relief. Finding the place already fallen, Michael made no attempt to recapture it but instead sailed away to Muscat. The Siege had lasted from 29 September to 21 December. Cambarão was later renamed "Bandar Abbas" in honor of its liberator.

== Bibliography ==
- Niels Steensgaard, The Asian Trade Revolution, The East India Companies and the Decline of the Caravan Trade.
- Frederick Charles Danvers, The Portuguese In India, Vol II.
- Abbas Amanat, Iran, A Modern History.
