= Tamar Amilakhvari =

Concubine of Safavid king Abbas I

- Consort of: Abbas I
- House: Amilakhvari
- Father: Faramarz Amilakhvari

Tamar Amilakhvari (Georgian: თამარ ამილახვარი) was a 17th-century Georgian noblewoman from the Amilakhvari family and a favourite concubine of Safavid Shah Abbas the Great (r. 1588–1629).

== Biography ==
Tamar was a daughter of Faramarz Amilakhvari, and a sister of Abd-ol-Ghaffar Amilakhvari. Sometime around 1619, after Abbas I ordered roughly 40,000 immigrant Georgian and Armenian families in Farahabad to conduct the Epiphany ceremony, Tamar donated some 30,000 tomans for the construction of "an all-weather paved causeway to Farrokhabad". She dedicated the act to God as an offer for Abbas I's health.
