= Verini =

Verini is a surname. Notable people with the surname include:

- Antonio Verini (1936–2021), Italian politician
- James Verini (fl. 2015), American magazine journalist
- Walter Verini (born 1956), Italian politician

== See also ==
- Verni
