= Shah Verdi =

Shah Verdi or Shahverdi literally means "Shah gave" in some languages. It may refer to

== People ==
- Shah Verdi Khan, the last atabeg of Lesser Luristan of the Khorshidi dynasty
- Shah Verdi Khan (Georgian) (fl. 17th-century), Safavid official of Georgian origin
- Shahverdi Khan of Ganja
- Shahverdi Sultan

== Places ==
- Shahverdi, Iran
- Shahverdi, Isfahan, Iran
