= Verdi (name) =

Verdi is a personal name. It may be either surname or a given name. Notable people with the name include:

== Surname ==
- Chad A. Verdi, American film producer
- Clenet Verdi-Rose (born 1982), American film director, producer, and screenwriter
- Ellis Verdi (born 1955), American marketing and advertising executive
- Frank Verdi (born 1926), American baseball player
- Giuseppe Verdi (1813–1901), Italian composer
- Gregorio Verdi (20th century), Argentine actor
- José Verdi (born 1990), Venezuelan volleyball player
- Leonard Verdi Goldsworthy (1909–1994), Australian bomb and mine specialist
- Paride Suzzara Verdi (1826–1879), Italian journalist and politician
- Robert Verdi (born 1968), American television personality
- Roger Verdi (born 1953), English retired professional footballer
- Simone Verdi (born 1992), Italian footballer
- Tory Verdi, American women's basketball coach

== Given name ==
- Verdi Godwin (1926–2013), English footballer
- Verdi Boyer (1911–2003), American football player

== See also ==
- Allah Verdi (disambiguation)
- Shah Verdi (disambiguation)
- Verde (surname)
