= Anduqapar Amilakhvari =

Georgian Amilakhvari noble from Kartli (died c.1626)

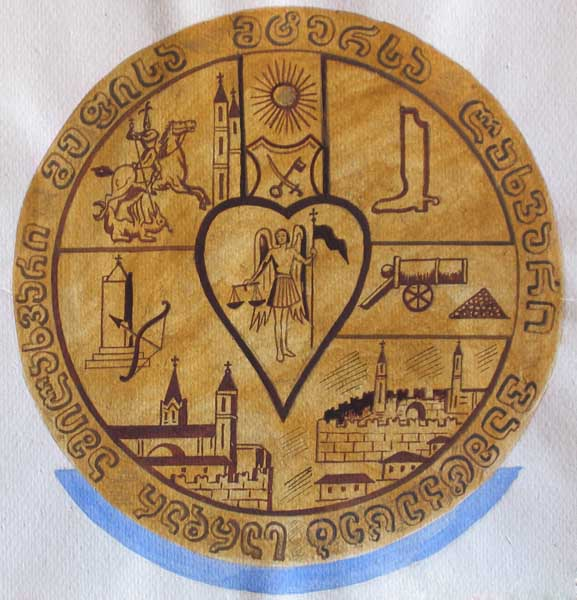

Anduqapar Amilakhvari (Georgian: ანდუყაფარ ამილახვარი, romanized: anduq'apar amilakhvari; (Note: Abd-ol-Ghaffar is mentioned in the Georgian sources as "Anduqapar". The literal Georgian transliteration of Abd-ol-Ghaffar is აბდულყაფარ.) died c. 1626), also known as Abd-ol-Ghaffar Amilakhori (Note: Also spelled "Abd al-Gaffar" or "Abd al-Ghaffar".) (Persian: عبدالقفار, romanized: Abd-ol-Qaffār), was an early 17th-century noble from the Georgian Amilakhvari family of Kartli, prominent in the Safavid Iranian service.

== Biography ==
Anduqapar Amilakhvari was raised at the Safavid court in Isfahan and was a "typical member of the new Georgian converted elite". Anduqapar was a son of Faramarz Amilakhvari by his wife Tamar, a great-grandson of King Luarsab I of Kartli. His sister Tamar was a favourite concubine of the Safavid shah Abbas I (r. 1588–1629).

When in 1624, Abbas I married off his granddaughter to the ruler of Kartli, Semayun Khan (Simon II), Anduqapar's wife was a companion to the bride. Anduqapar and another leading Georgian noble, Zurab, Duke of Aragvi, entertained the guests of the wedding party on the orders of the Safavid-Georgian officer Murav Beg (Giorgi Saakadze). Around the same time, the Shah arranged the marriage of Anduqapar Amilakhori to a daughter of Emamqoli Khan, a prominent Safavid military and political leader of Georgian descent. According to the contemporary Safavid historian Fazli Khuzani, Amilakhori was 22-years old at the time of his marriage.

While in Kartli, Anduqapar was known as a champion of the Safavid interests in the country. He further expanded his estates at the expense of the neighbouring noble families, exterminated the Ghazneli and had the area around Mtskheta ravaged. In 1625/26, Anduqapar and his wife were captured by the rebellious Georgians and imprisoned in the fortress of Arshi. After the rebels' defeat at the battle of Marabda, Abbas I sent a force to rescue them. According to Fazli Khuzani, upon being informed of this, the rebels sent Anduqapar and his wife to Anduqapar's relatives, as well as those of Allahverdi Khan (the father of Imam-Quli Khan). Anduqapar, thereafter, disappears from historical records.

== Sources ==
- Floor, Willem; Herzig, Edmund, eds. (2012). Iran and the World in the Safavid Age. I.B.Tauris. ISBN 978-1780769905.
- Maeda, Hirotake (2003). "On the Ethno-Social Background of Four Gholām Families from Georgia in Safavid Iran". Studia Iranica (32): 1–278.
- Tukhashvili, Lovard (1975). "ანდუყაფარ ამილახვარი [Anduqapar Amilakhvari]". ქართული საბჭოთა ენციკლოპედია [Georgian Soviet Encyclopedia] (in Georgian). Tbilisi: Metsniereba. p. 391.
