= Daud Khan Undiladze =

Safavid Iranian military commander and politician of Georgian origin

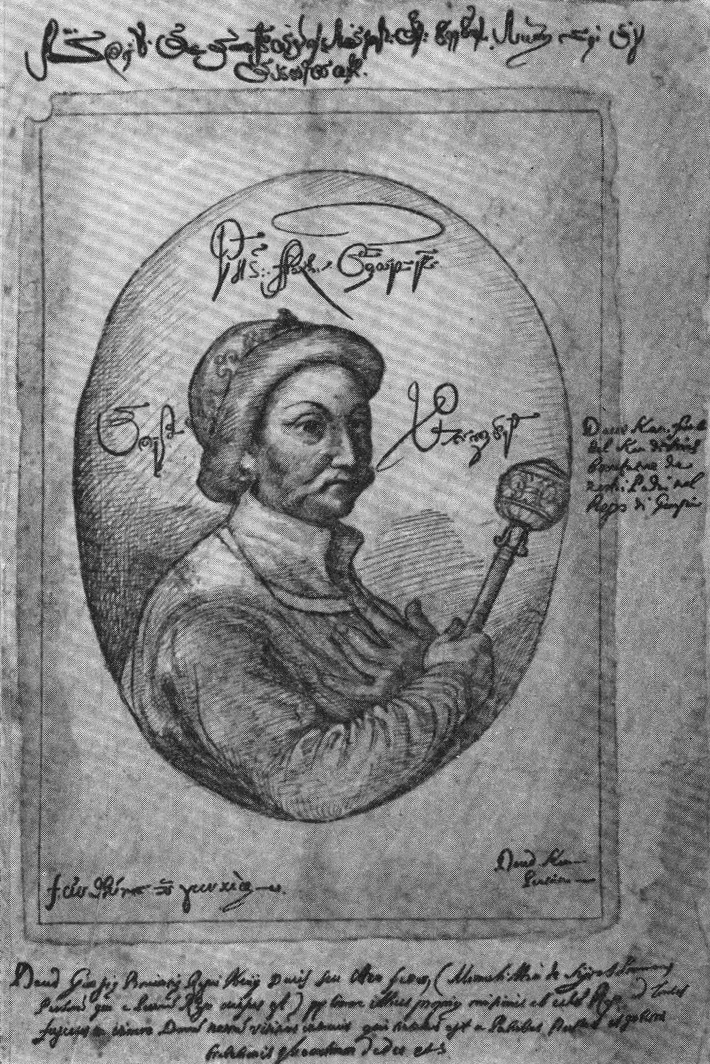

Governor of Karabakh-Ganja
- In office 1627–1633
- Preceded by: Mohammad-Qoli Khan Qajar
- Succeeded by: Mohammad-Qoli Khan Qajar

Personal details
- Parent: Allahverdi Khan (father)
- Relatives: Imam-Quli Khan (brother), Jafarqoli Khan (great-nephew)
- Clan: Undiladze
- Nickname: Dāvūd B. Allāhverdī

Military service
- Allegiance: Safavid Iran

Daud-Khan or Dāvūd b. Allāhverdī (Persian: داوود خان; Georgian: დაუდ-ხანი) was a Safavid Iranian military commander and politician of Georgian origin who served as governor (beglarbeg) of Ganja and Karabakh from 1627 to 1633.

== Biography ==
Daud Khan was the son of Allahverdi Khan, a former Georgian gholam ("military slave") from the Undiladze clan who rose through the highest ranks in the Safavid administration under Shah Abbas I of Persia (r. 1588–1629). Daud-Khan, unlike his father and older brother, Imam-Quli Khan, had closer ties with the country of his origin; he was married to Helen, the sister of the Georgian king Teimuraz I of Kakheti, and was on friendly terms with the Georgian warlord Giorgi Saakadze (Murav Beg). Daud-Khan tried to mediate a conflict between Abbas I and the shah's recalcitrant Georgian subjects. After Shah Safi succeeded upon the death of Abbas in 1629, the new shah's mentor and yet another influential Georgian at the Safavid court, Khosro Mirza, succeeded in sidelining the rival Undiladze clan, and persuaded Safi into removing Daud-Khan from the majles in 1630/31. In 1633, alarmed by the political purges within the Iranian ruling élite, Daud fled to Georgia, where he apparently encouraged his brother-in-law Teimuraz I to renew his rebellion against the Safavid overlordship. Daud claimed that one of his brothers was actually the son of the late shah Abbas I and that he, having 30,000 troops under his command, had already conquered all of Fars, Bahrain, Lar, Hormuz, Khuzestan, Arabestan, and Hoveyzeh.

Teimuraz and Daud started to attack the Persian garrisons in and near Georgia and launched several raids on Ganja of which Daud-Khan had been dispossessed after his defection to Georgia. Teimuraz refused to surrender Daud in exchange of the shah's parole and allowed him a free passage to the Ottoman possessions. Since then, he disappears from the records. His brother and nephews were annihilated, and Daud's sons castrated on the shah's order, thus largely ending the career of this illustrious Iranian Georgian family.

Beyond his military and administrative career, Daud Khan commissioned several building projects and patronized Catholic missioners in Georgia and Ganja.

== Notes ==
Preceded by Mohammad-Qoli Khan Qajar (1st term)	Governor of Karabakh-Ganja; 1627–1633	Succeeded by Mohammad-Qoli Khan Qajar (2nd term)
