= Emamqoli Khan =

Iranian military and political leader and governor (died 1632)

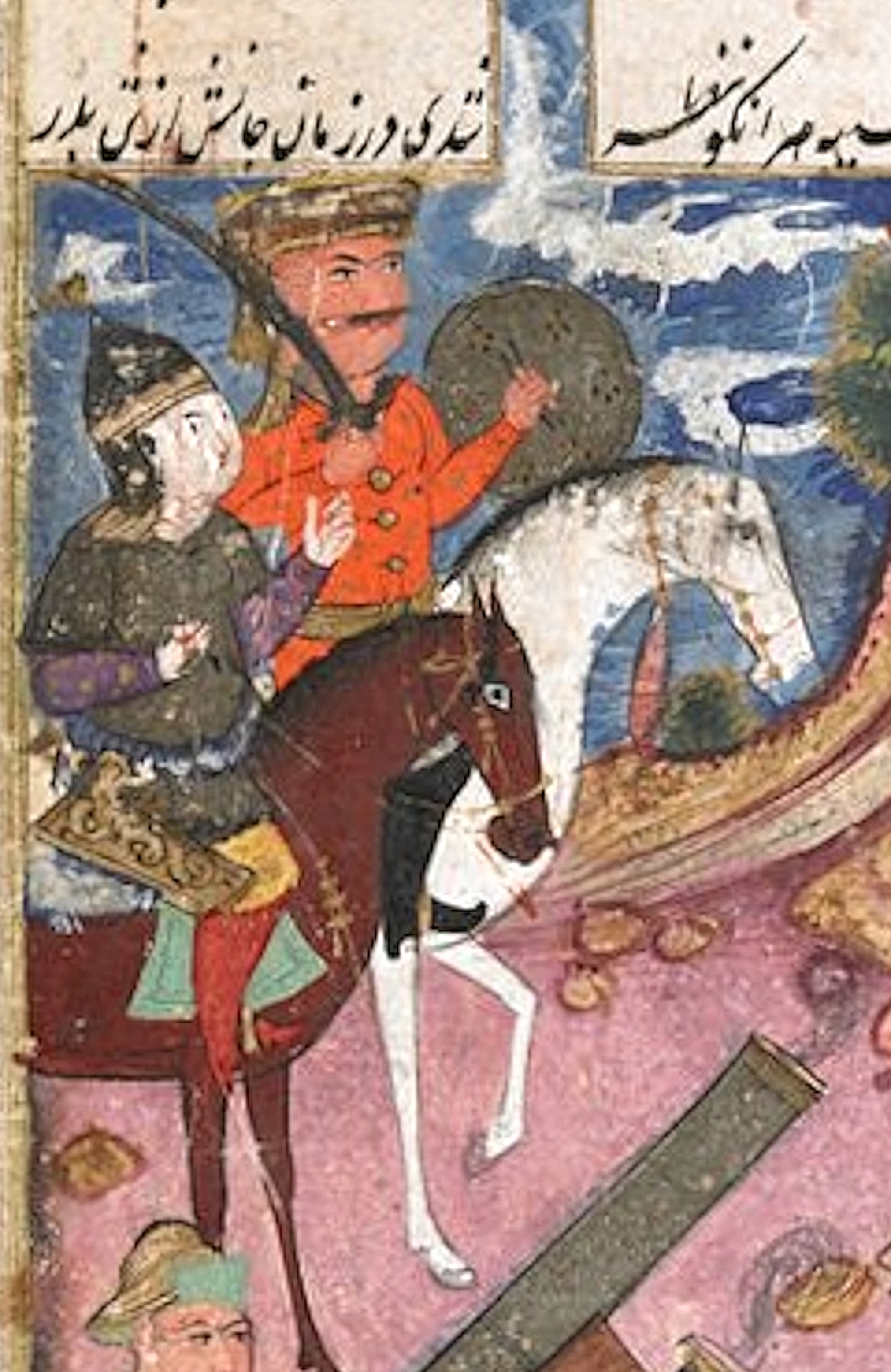
- Emamqoli Khan (white horse) leading the Safavid siege of Hormuz against the Portuguese. Jarunnameh, 1697. British Library (Add MS 7801).

Governor of Fars
- In office 1613–1632
- Monarchs: Abbas I, Safi
- Preceded by: Allahverdi Khan
- Succeeded by: Mirza Mo'en

Personal details
- Died: 1632
- Parent: Allahverdi Khan (father)
- Relatives: Daud Khan (brother), Safiqoli Khan (son), Jafarqoli Khan (grandson), Abd-ol-Ghaffar Amilakhori (son-in-law)
- Clan: Undiladze

Military service
- Allegiance: Safavid Iran
- Battles/wars: Portuguese–Safavid wars; Portuguese–Safavid War (1621–1630); Capture of Cambarão; Capture of Qeshm; Capture of Hormuz; Ottoman–Safavid War (1623–1639); Safavid invasions of Basra

Emamqoli Khan (Persian: امام‌قلی خان, romanized: Emāmqolī Khān; 1582–1632) was a Safavid military and political leader of Georgian origin who served as a governor of Fars, Lar and Bahrain for the shahs Abbas the Great and Safi.

== Biography ==
Emamqoli Khan was the son of Allahverdi Khan (Undiladze), the celebrated Georgian general in the service of Iran's Safavid dynasty. Emamqoli Khanis first mentioned as governor of Lar in Fars in 1610. He succeeded his father as governor-general (beglarbeg) of Fars in 1613, but retained his position at Lar and was granted the rank of an amir of the divan by Shah Abbas I. In 1619–20, Emamqoli Khan oversaw Abbas's project to link the headwaters of the Karun and Zayandarud rivers in order to enhance the water supply of his capital, Isfahan. Shah Abbas placed complete trust in Emamqoli Khan who grew in influence and prestige and became one of the wealthiest khans of the Safavid empire. One day, Shah Abbas even jokingly said to Imam-Quli: "I request, Imam-Quli, that you will spend one dirham less per day, that there may exist some slight difference between the disbursements of a khan and a king!"

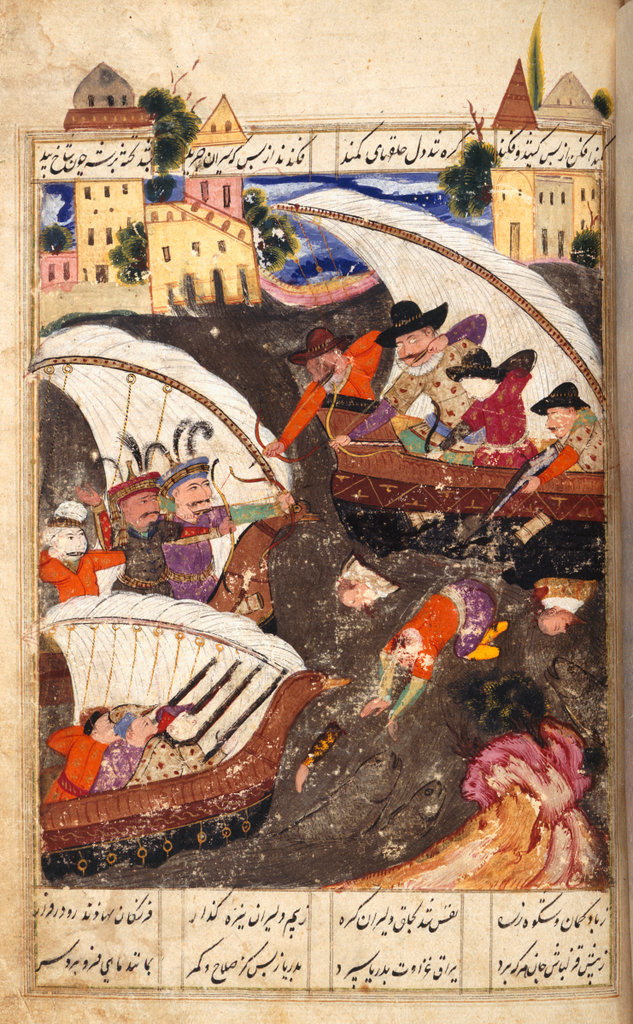
Emamqoli Khan with his soldiers in boats repulsed by the Portuguese at the Siege of Hormuz.

Imam-Quli built a madrasa and many palaces in Shiraz and the still standing bridge Pol-e Khan over the Kor at Marvdasht.

Being in charge of the Safavids' southern possessions, Emamqoli Khan continued his father's policy of undermining the Portuguese positions in the Persian Gulf. In 1621, he persuaded the English East India Company to cooperate with the Persians by threatening to cancel the trading privileges that had been granted to the company by the shah in 1615. As a result, Emamqoli Khan's army aided by the English navy captured the strategic Portuguese fort on the island of Qeshm and laid a siege to Hormuz, which surrendered after a defence of ten weeks on 22 April 1622. The khan's military exploits are commemorated in the works by the poet Qadri from Fars.

According to the Safavid historian Fazli Khuzani, Emamqoli Khan had 22 daughters, of which some were married to Safavid Georgian gholams of noble origin in 1622. In 1626, when Imam-Quli's daughter and son-in-law Anduqapar Amilakhori were captured by rebellious Georgians, Abbas I sent a large army in order to rescue them.

== Fall and death ==
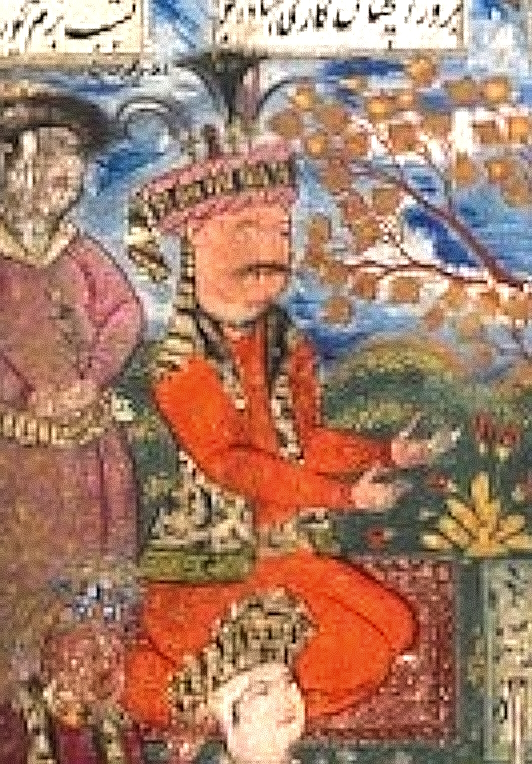
Emamqoli Khan in Jarunnameh by Qadri, Isfahan (1697)

After the death of Abbas, Emamqoli Khan found himself in disagreement with new favorites of Shah Safi, Abbas's successor to the throne of Persia, and became marginalized. This circumstance lasted until he and his two sons, one of them being Safiqoli Khan, were put to death at Safi's orders in late 1632, while his vast possessions were converted into the crown domain in 1633. This formed the prelude to the massacre of the rest of his family. Only his brother, Daud Khan, survived as he had fled to Georgia. Though the Undiladze Safavid Georgian line was nearly eliminated after the purge, the succession of the line amongst the court elites was assured by Ja'far Qoli, a grandson of Emamqoli Khan by a daughter. A statue to Emamqoli Khan was erected in Qeshm in the 1990s.

== Sources ==
- Babaie, Sussan; Babayan, Kathryn; Baghdiantz-McCabe, Ina; Farhad, Massumeh (2004). Slaves of the Shah: New Elites of Safavid Iran. I.B. Tauris. ISBN 978-1860647215.
- Canby, Sheila R. (2009). Shah ʻAbbas : the remaking of Iran. British Museum Press. ISBN 978-0-7141-2456-8.
- Maeda, Hirotake (2003). "On the Ethno-Social Background of Four Gholām Families from Georgia in Safavid Iran". Studia Iranica (32). Peeters Publishers: 243–278. doi:10.2143/SI.32.2.563203.
- Matthee, Rudi (2012). Persia in Crisis: Safavid Decline and the Fall of Isfahan. I.B.Tauris. ISBN 978-1845117450.
- Newman, Andrew J. (2008). Safavid Iran: Rebirth of a Persian Empire. I.B.Tauris. ISBN 978-0857716613.
- Savory, Roger (1998). "Emāmqolī Khan". In Yarshater, Ehsan (ed.). Encyclopædia Iranica (Online ed.). Encyclopædia Iranica Foundation. ISBN 978-1568590585.
