= Undiladze =

Georgian noble family in the service of Iran's Safavid dynasty

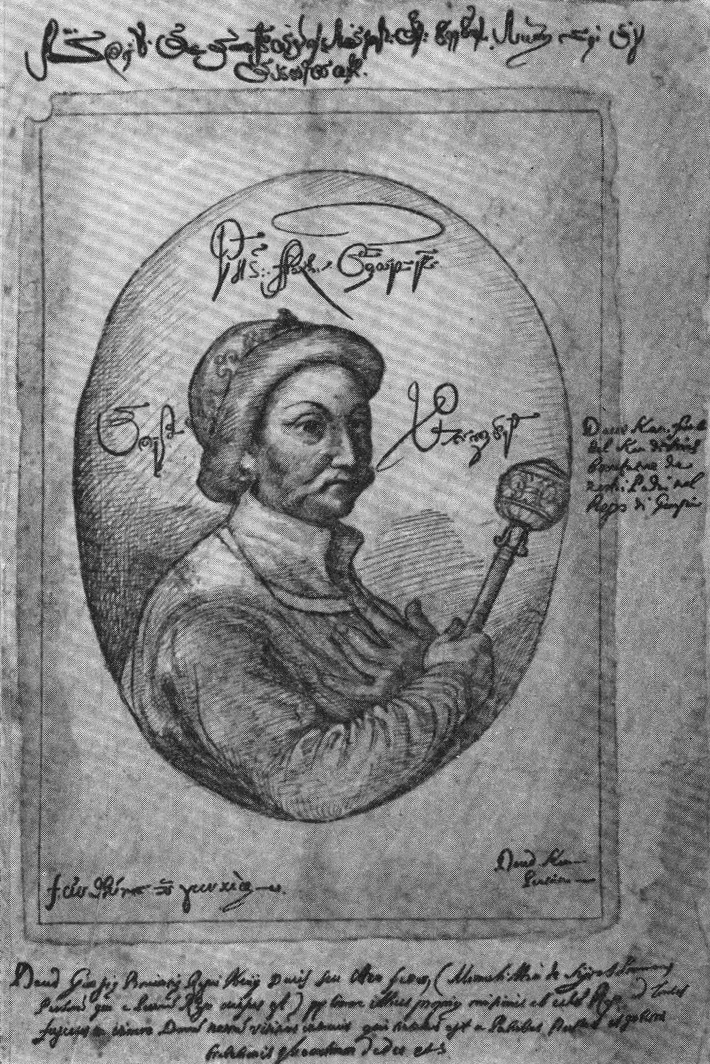
Daud-Khan, beglarbeg of Ganja and Karabakh

The Undiladze family (Georgian: უნდილაძე, Persian: اوندیلادزه) was a Georgian noble family whose members rose in prominence in the service of Safavid Iran and dominated the Shah's court at a certain period of the late 16th and early 17th centuries.

== History ==
The first known member of this family, Allahverdi Khan, was born to a Christian family in Georgia, but captured by the Persians during one of their raids, converted into Islam and trained for the ghulam army, a special military structure consisting of Christian captives. His raise to the governorship of Fars in 1595 marked the beginning of Shah Abbas I's policy of replacing Turkic Qizilbash officers with the former ghulams. By 1600, Allahverdi-Khan made it into the most influential minister of the Safavid empire, being succeeded upon his death in 1613 by his older son, Imam-Quli Khan. Both father and son were responsible for the army reforms and major military exploits, including a series of successful campaigns that brought the Portuguese colonial gains in the Persian Gulf to an end. Allahverdi's younger son, Daud Khan, served as governor of Ganja and Karabakh from 1627 to 1633, and had more intimate ties with Georgia, the country of the family's origin.

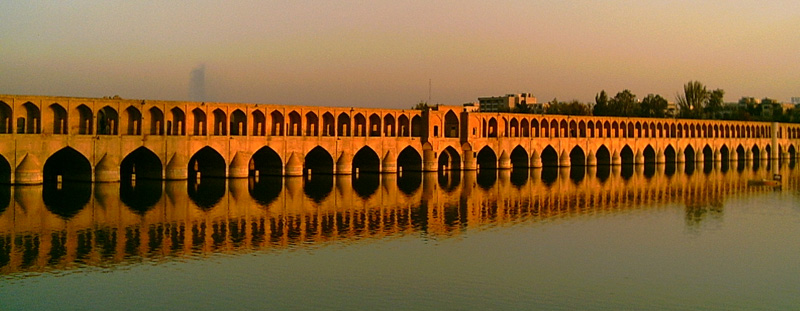
The Si-o-se Pol over the Zayandeh River constructed at the behest of Allahverdi Khan by the architect Mir Jamal al-Din Muhammad Jabiri.

Shah Abbas I placed complete trust in the family and did not feel threatened by their wealth and power. With Abbas's death in 1629, the family's influence began to fade. The new shah, Safi, extremely suspicious of Abbas's favorites, resorted to bloody repressions, not without the advice and involvement of his new ministers, including the shah's mentor Khosrow Mirza (Rostam Khan), a Muslim Georgian prince of the Bagrationi dynasty. In late 1632, at Shah Safi's orders, Imam-Quli Khan, and his two sons amongst whom Safiqoli Khan, were killed, and his possessions added to the crown domain. This also formed the prelude to the massacre of the rest of his family. Things came to a head in 1633, after Daud Khan Undiladze, recently removed from his position in the majlis, defected to Georgia and joined his brother-in-law, Teimuraz I, in his rebellion against the Safavid hegemony. Daud Khan's sons were captured and castrated. Daud himself, being pressured by the Persian troops in Georgia, fled to the Ottoman Empire and disappeared from history. Though they were nearly eliminated after the purge, the succession of the Undiladze line amongst the court elites was assured by Ja'far Qoli, a grandson of Imam-Quli Khan by a daughter, who was given the post of beglarbegi (governor) of Astrabad in 1664 or 1666.

The family has left a visible trace in Iranian culture. Their patronage of arts and education and zeal for building resulted in several notable examples of the Safavid architecture, especially in Shiraz and Esfahan. A statue to Imam-Quli Khan was installed on the island of Qeshm in the 2000s.

== See also ==
- Iranian Georgians
