= Allahverdi Khan =

Iranian general and statesman (c.1560–1613)

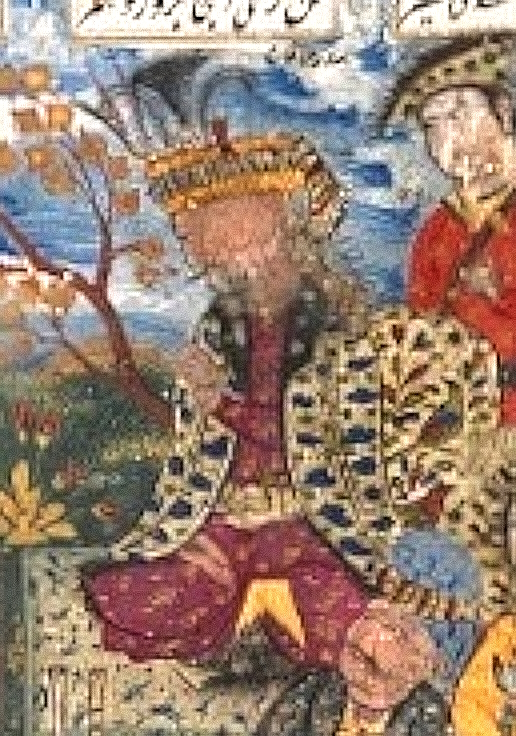
- Allahverdi Khan. From a Jarunnameh of Qadri. Isfahan style, dated 1697

Governor of Fars
- In office 1595–6 – 1613
- Monarch: Abbas I
- Preceded by: Farhad Khan Qaramanlu
- Succeeded by: Emamqoli Khan

Personal details
- Born: c. 1560
- Died: 3 June 1613
- Relatives: Daud Khan Undiladze (son); Emamqoli Khan (son); Safiqoli Khan Undiladze (grandson); Jafarqoli Khan (great-grandson)
- Clan: Undiladze

Military service
- Allegiance: Safavid Iran
- Years of service: 1570s(?)–1613
- Battles/wars: Safavid conquest of Bahrain; Ottoman–Safavid War (1603–1618)

Allahverdi Khan (Persian: الله‌وردی خان, Georgian: ალავერდი-ხანი; c. 1560 – 3 June 1613) was a Safavid general and statesman of Georgian origin who, initially a gholam ("military slave"), rose to high office in the Safavid Iran.

Iskandar Beg Munshi, the Safavid court historian at the time, describes him as "one of the most powerful statesman to hold office under this dynasty", and a "man of great forbearance, modest and chaste". Shah Abbas I demonstrated his genuine respect and affection for him by personally supervising the funeral arrangements, and by going to his house the day after his death to offer his personal condolences to his family.

== Biography ==
=== Background ===
Allahverdi was born a Christian Georgian, surnamed Undiladze. Like many of his compatriots and fellow Christian Georgians, Armenians and Circassians, he was taken prisoner in the course of one of the Caucasian campaigns of Shah Tahmasp I and converted to Islam to be trained for service in the gholam army, a special military structure consisting of Christian captives that was created later by Abbas I to counterpoise the power of the Qizilbash, which constituted the nucleus of the Safavid military aristocracy.

=== Service under Shah Abbas I ===
In 1589, he took part in the assassination of the powerful minister (vakil) and kingmaker Morshed-Kholi Khan Ostaglu, who was secretly condemned to death by Shah Abbas I. As a result, he was made sultan and a governor of Jorpadagan near Isfahan, the Safavid capital. He then rapidly rose to higher offices and was appointed commander of the gholam army (qollar-aghasi), thus becoming one of the five principal officers in the Safavid administration by 1595/6. In the same year, Shah Abbas I appointed him the governor of Fars, a move that made him the first gholam to attain equal status with the Qizilbash emirs. This act also meant that the large provinces would no longer be administered by semi-autonomous and frequently self-minded Qizilbash emirs, but by officers appointed directly by the Shah.

Allahverdi Khan (seated center right) with his son Emamqoli Khan (seated center left). From a Jarunnameh of Qadri. Isfahan style, dated 1697

In 1596/7, he was transferred to the governorship of Kohgiluyeh. In 1597, two clans of the Afshar tribe, the Arsahlu and Gundzulu, together with some Lur and Arab tribes, rebelled at Ramhormoz. However, it was shortly suppressed by Allahverdi Khan.

In August 1598, Allahverdi Khan, as a sardar-e-lashkar (commander-in-chief), was instrumental in recovering Herat from the Uzbek tribes and shortly after this victory was ordered by the shah to put a powerful Qizilbash emir Farhad Khan Qaramanlu to death. This act turned Allahverdi Khan into the most powerful man in the Safavid Empire after the shah. From 1600 onwards, counseled by the English gentleman of fortune, Sir Robert Sherley, he reorganized the army and strengthened it by increasing the number of gholam troops from 4,000 to 25,000.

Allahverdi Khan led the Persian armies in a number of successful campaigns on both the eastern and the western frontiers of the Safavid empire, including the 1601–2 conquest of Bahrain. In 1605, during the Ottoman–Safavid War of 1603–1618, Allahverdi Khan besieged the Ottoman city of Van. During the siege, he was informed of Ottoman reinforcements under Mehmed Pasha marching towards the city. He then sent an army under Qarachaqay Khan to stop the reinforcements from arriving, which he successfully accomplished. However, Allahverdi Khan later lifted the siege, and returned to Abbas I, who was in Khoy. On 6 November, Allahverdi Khan took part in the battle of Sufiyan, where the Safavids decisively defeated the Ottomans.

=== Death and burial ===
Allahverdi Khan died on 3 June 1613, during a visit at Isfahan. His death greatly saddened Abbas I, who accompanied his bier to a place where the corpses of the deceased were ritually washed and prepared for the burial. Abbas I also visited the house of Allahverdi Khan's family in Isfahan, where he offered his condolences. He thereafter appointed Allahverdi Khan's son Emamqoli Khan as the governor of Fars, thus succeeding his deceased father. Allahverdi Khan was buried in an exquisite tomb at Mashhad. His tomb was built next to the Imam Reza shrine as a unique way of respect, which reflects his standing and status in the Safavid empire. The tomb still stands to this day; it is an elegant two-storied octagonal structure with marble slabs and tiles sheathing the interior.

Allahverdi also had another son named Daud Khan, who would later serve as the governor of Ganja and Karabakh.

== Legacy ==
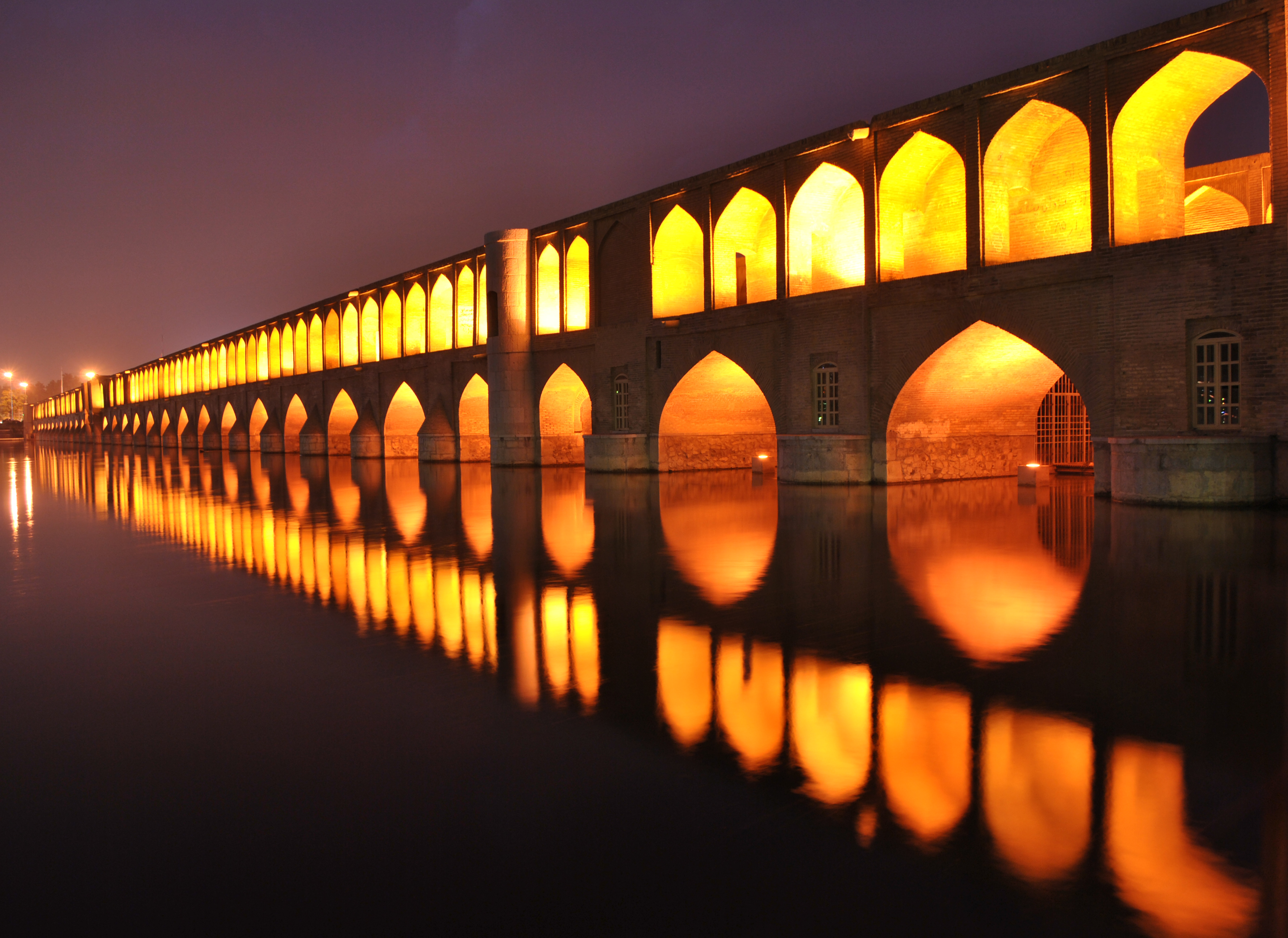
Si-o-se-pol, also known as the "Allahverdi Khan Bridge"

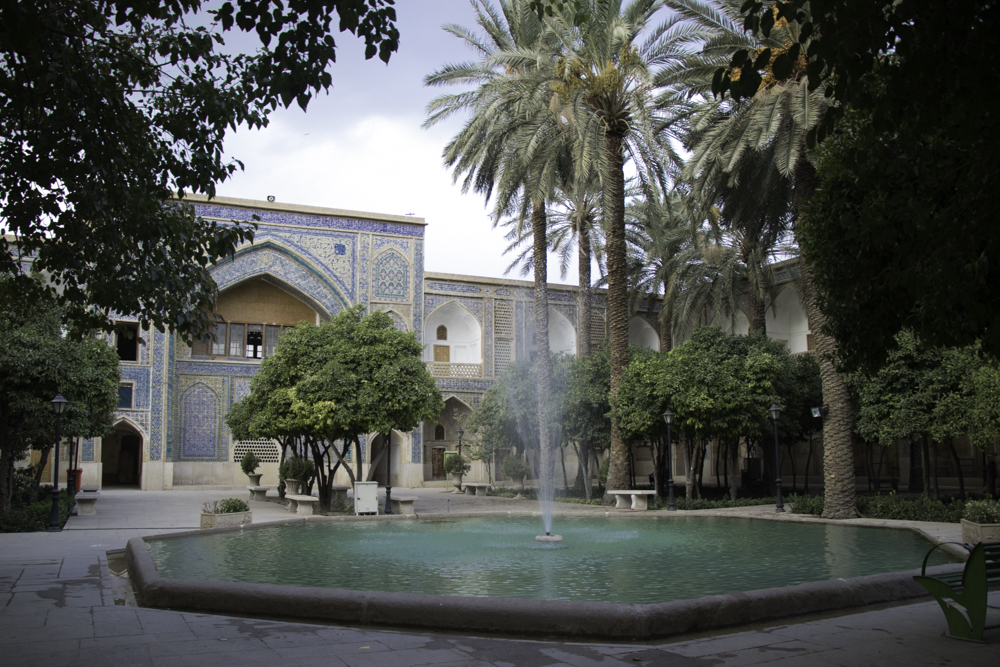
Madrasa Khan, in Shiraz

Allahverdi Khan presided over construction of several public buildings and charitable foundations. The Si-o-se-pol bridge across the Zayandeh River built by the architect Mir Jamal al-Din Muhammad Jabiri in Isfahan under Allahverdi Khan's patronage still bears the general's name. Allahverdi Khan is furthermore credited with several other building works, such as a large double dam near Sarab; a fortification around a village in Fars; a large qaysariyya, or royal market, in Lar, which impressed the Spanish envoy García de Silva Figueroa; and a stately house near Nahavand for Abbas I. Allahverdi Khan also initiated the construction of a large theological college, Madrasa Khan, in Shiraz as a teaching base for the Islamic scholar Mulla Sadra. The project would be completed by his son Emamqoli Khan.

== See also ==
- Iranian Georgians

== Sources ==
- Babaie, Sussan (2004). Slaves of the Shah: New Elites of Safavid Iran. I.B.Tauris. pp. 1–218. ISBN 9781860647215.
- Blow, David (2009). Shah Abbas: The Ruthless King Who became an Iranian Legend. London, UK: I. B. Tauris & Co. Ltd. ISBN 978-1-84511-989-8. LCCN 2009464064.
- Floor, Willem; Herzig, Edmund, eds. (2015). Iran and the World in the Safavid Age. I.B.Tauris. ISBN 978-1780769905.
- Matthee, Rudi (1999). "FARHĀD KHAN QARAMĀNLŪ, ROKN-AL-SALṬANA". Encyclopaedia Iranica.
- Matthee, Rudi (2011). Persia in Crisis: Safavid Decline and the Fall of Isfahan. I.B.Tauris. pp. 1–371. ISBN 978-0857731814.
- Mikaberidze, Alexander (ed., 2007). Allahverdi Khan. Dictionary of Georgian National Biography.
- Newman, Andrew J. (2008). Safavid Iran: Rebirth of a Persian Empire. I.B.Tauris. pp. 1–281. ISBN 9780857716613.
- Potts, Daniel T. (2014). Nomadism in Iran: From Antiquity to the Modern Era. London and New York: Oxford University Press. ISBN 9780199330799.
- Roemer, H.R. (1986). "The Safavid period". The Cambridge History of Iran, Volume 5: The Timurid and Safavid periods. Cambridge: Cambridge University Press. pp. 189–351. ISBN 9780521200943.
- Savory, R. M. (1985). "ALLĀHVERDĪ KHAN (1)". Encyclopaedia Iranica, Vol. I, Fasc. 8. pp. 891–892.
- Savory, Roger (2007). Iran under the Safavids. Cambridge University Press. pp. 1–288. ISBN 978-0521042512.

Preceded by Farhad Khan Qaramanlu	Governor of Fars; 1595/6 – 1613	Succeeded by Emamqoli Khan
