= Shahverdi Khan (Georgian) =

Shahverdi Khan (fl. 17th-century) was a Safavid official of Georgian origin, who served as a governor (vali) of the Lorestan province during the reign of king Suleiman I (r. 1666–1694). Prior to his appointment, the Lorestan rulers were appointed from local chiefs. In 1674, the people of the province revolted against him.

== Sources ==
- Floor, Willem (2001). Safavid Government Institutions. Costa Mesa, California: Mazda Publishers. ISBN 978-1568591353.
- Matthee, Rudi (2012). Persia in Crisis: Safavid Decline and the Fall of Isfahan. I.B.Tauris. ISBN 978-1845117450.
