= Portuguese–Safavid War (1621–1630) =

Conflicts between the Portuguese Empire and Safavid Empire

- Part of Portuguese–Safavid wars
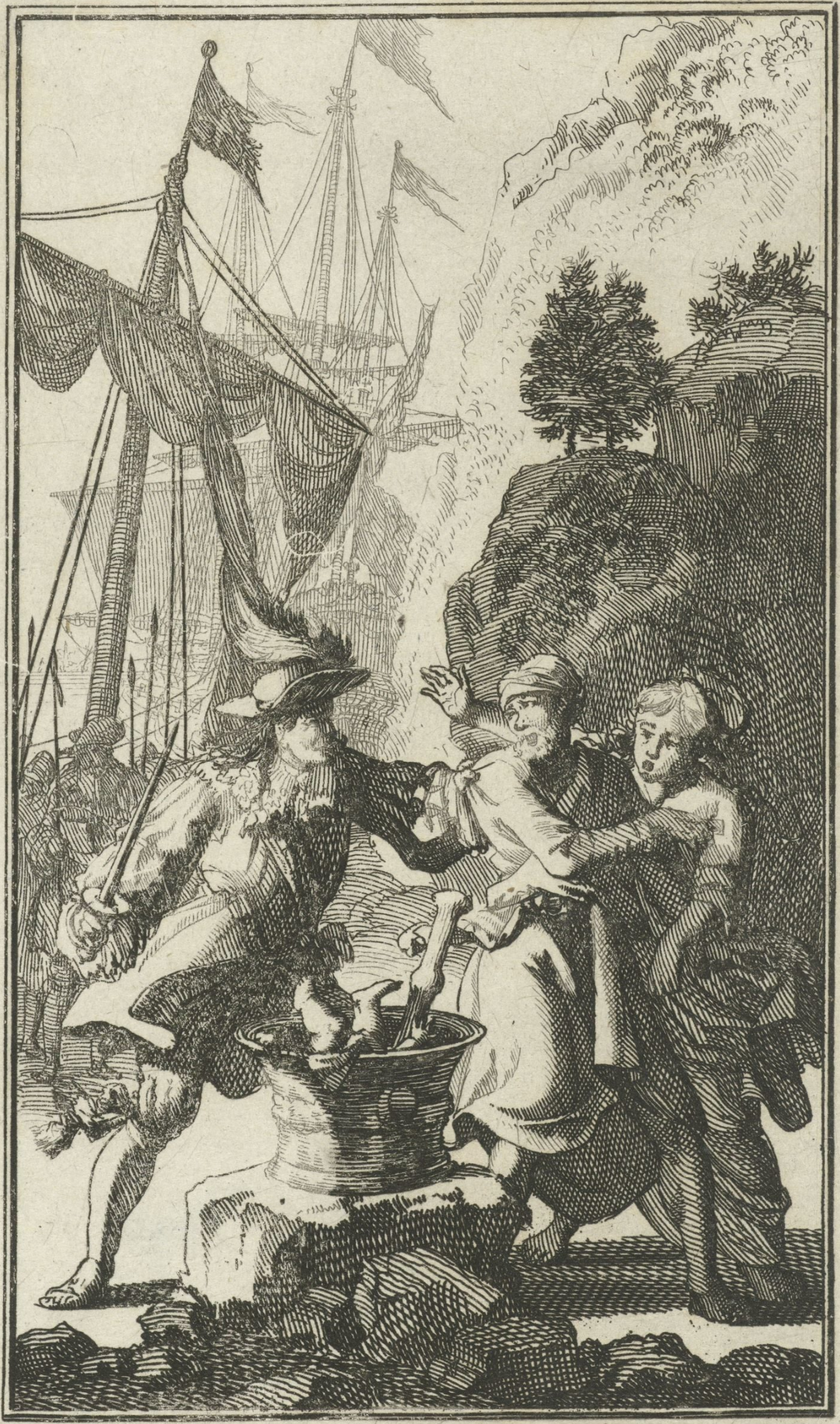
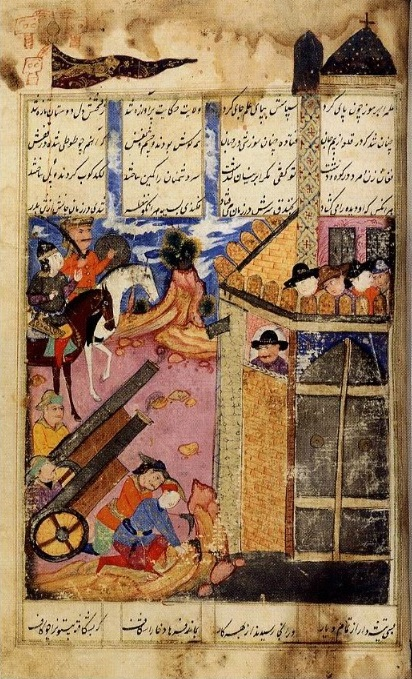
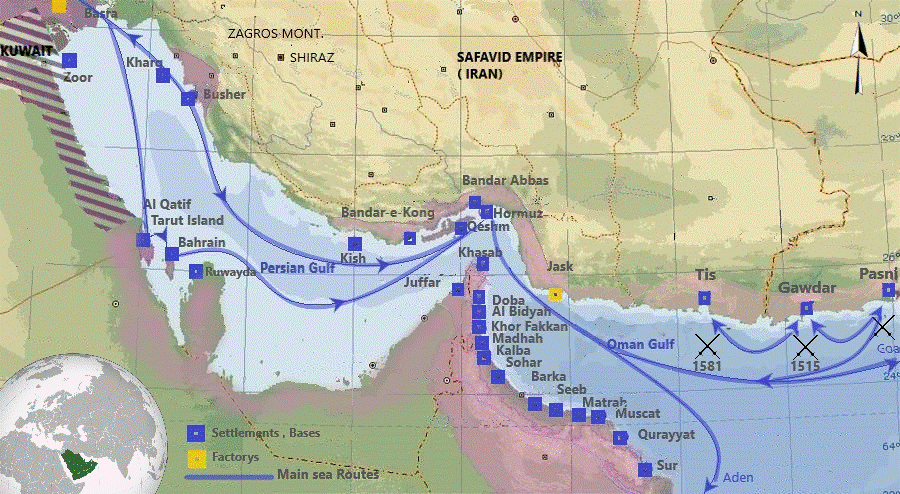
- From top to bottom, left to right: 1689 engraving depicting Capitão Geral Rui Freire de Andrade landing at Qeshm; 1697 Safavid illustration of the Anglo-Persian capture of Hormuz; Portuguese presence in the Persian Gulf (1507–1750)
Date	1621 – 1630 (Note: Other dates suggested include c. 1602 to 1622 or c. 1614 to 1622.)
Location	Persian Gulf
Result	Portuguese victory
Territorial changes	Safavid capture of Hormuz; Portuguese recovery of coastal Oman; Qeshm becomes a Portuguese vassal

Belligerents
Portuguese India; Kingdom of Hormuz; Imamate of Nizwa; Pashalik of Basra; Sheikhdom of Qatif	Safavid Iran; East India Company

Commanders and leaders
Álvares Botelho (Note: Governor of Portuguese India and Captain general of the Armadas de Alto Bordo.); Freire de Andrade (Note: Captain general and Chief of Naval Operations in the Strait.); Gonçalo da Silveira (Note: Captain-major of the Strait.)	Shah Abbas I Imam Quli Khan (Note: Khan of Shiraz and General.); Edward Monnox (Note: East India Company agent in Isfahan.)

The Portuguese–Safavid War (1621–1630) (Note: Alternatively known as Bandel War or Arabian War.) was a series of military conflicts between the Portuguese State of India and the Safavid Empire over control of ports and islands in the Persian Gulf. The war began after the Portuguese constructed a fort on Qeshm, provoking Shah Abbas I to expel the Portuguese from Hormuz and Qeshm. Despite losing Hormuz in 1622, the Portuguese raided the Persian Gulf and repelled Safavid invasions of Basra. Hostilities ended with a peace agreement around 1630.

== Background ==
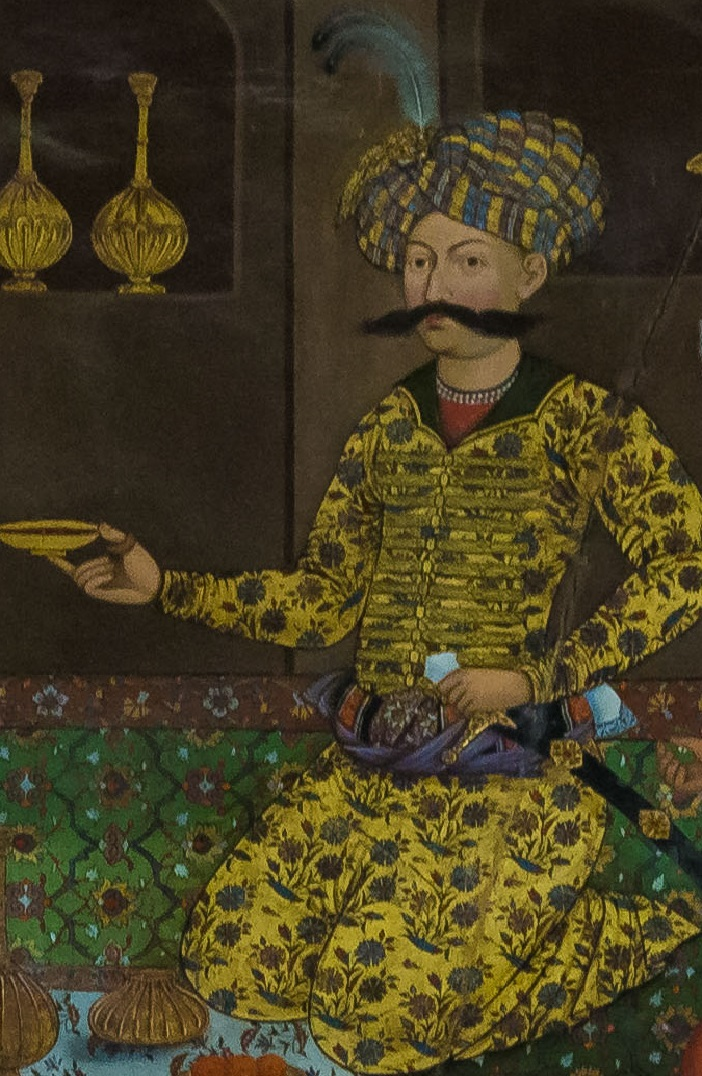
Extract of Abbas the Great in the Chehel Sotoun painting

At the beginning of the 17th century, Shah Abbas I began moving closer to Portuguese strongholds in the Persian Gulf. Allahverdi Khan conquered Lar in 1601–1602 and Bahrain in 1602, a Portuguese protectorate. The Portuguese viewed this as an act of aggression, which strained diplomatic relations.

With the return of the first mission to Goa in 1603, another Augustinian mission departed for Persia that same year. They were accompanied by Hosayn Ali Beg and Luís Pereira de Lacerda, who had been appointed ambassador to Shah Abbas I to recover Bahrain and pacify Portuguese–Safavid relations. In 1615, the Safavids signed an offensive alliance with the English East India Company, and by 1619, negotiations between the Persians and Portuguese–Spanish authorities had ended. Shah Abbas had long intended to expel the Portuguese from the Persian Gulf and was awaiting a favorable occasion to openly break with them. In the meantime, he took every opportunity to weaken Hormuz's position.

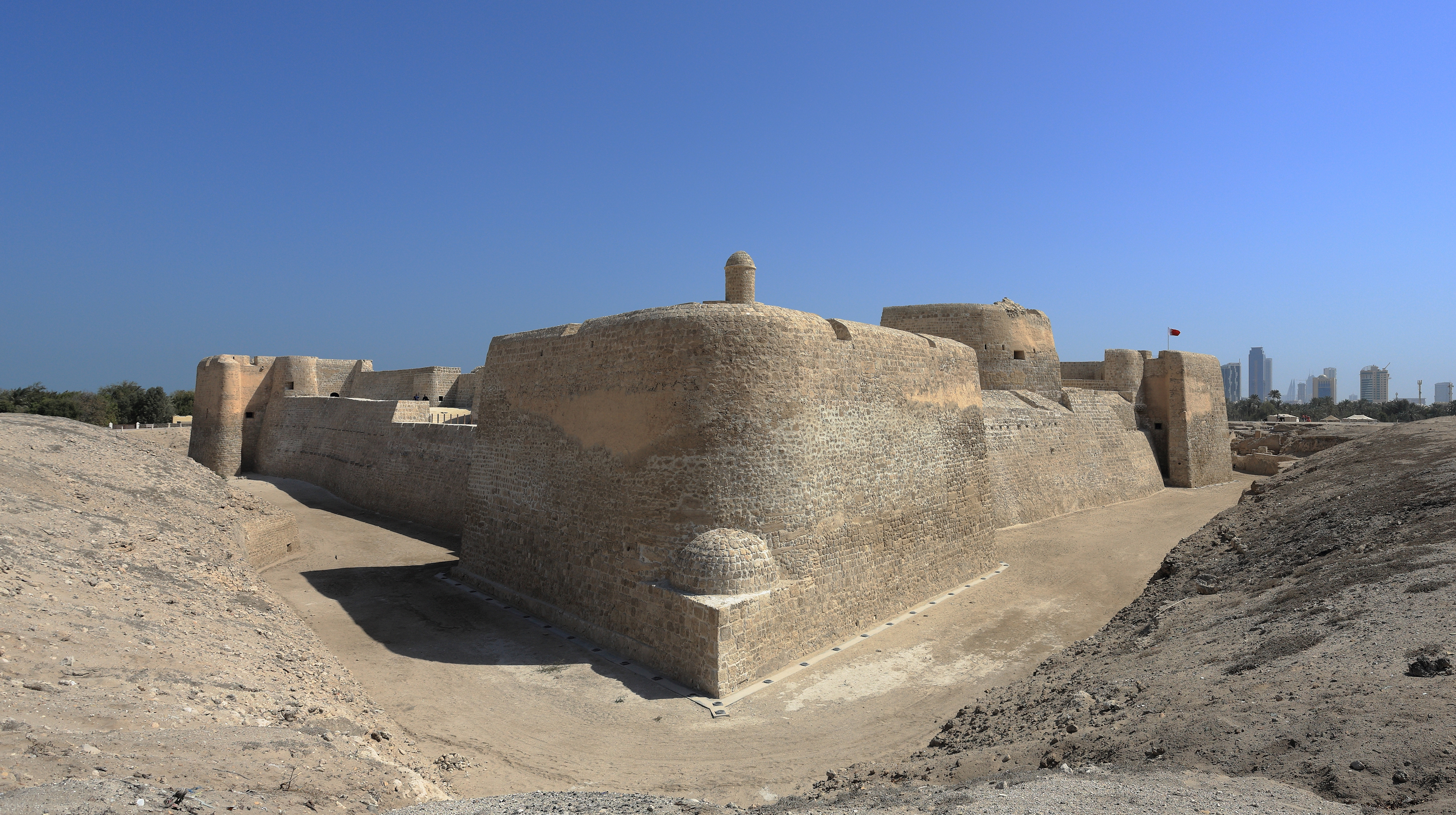
Portuguese fort in Bahrain

After the Safavid seizure of Bahrain, Bandar Abbas, and Qeshm, Philip II of Portugal dispatched two naval squadrons to preserve Iberian supremacy in the Persian Gulf. One sailed from Goa under Francisco de Lima, and the other from Lisbon under Rui Freire de Andrade to Hormuz in 1618. Andrade's orders were to "trace and destroy any foreign European ships that tried to establish trade connections with Persia… [and] patrol the Hormuz Straits and the mouth of the Red Sea… in order to seize ships sailing with forbidden goods or ships not in possession of Portuguese cartazes". Philip II was very explicit when he ordered Andrade to carefully manage their deteriorating relations, and that he should only fight with European rivals and not with the Shah or his vassals.

Later, on 15 January 1619, he was also instructed to erect a fort on Qeshm, an island held by the Persians since 1614. Rui Freire eventually arrived at Hormuz on 20 June 1620 after a disastrous voyage.

After dealing with affairs at Hormuz and fighting a costly naval battle against the English at Jask, Rui Freire turned his attention to Qeshm. The Portuguese captain of Hormuz fort, Dom Francisco de Sousa, opposed the construction of a fort, warning that it would end peaceful relations with Persia. Similarly, the governor, Fernão de Albuquerque, suggested he delay the erection of a fort so as not to provoke a war with the Safavids before decisively defeating the English at sea. The Shah of Hormuz, in contrast, supported the plan and even offered men and funds.

Overriding these objections, Rui Freire proceeded. On 7 May 1621, a fleet of 1,000 Portuguese arquebusiers, 500 Portuguese musketeers and 1,000 Hormuzi men sailed from Hormuz to Qeshm. 1,000 Persian cavalry on the beach were driven back by naval bombardment, allowing construction of the fortress to begin immediately.

== Course of hostilities ==
=== Capture of Qeshm (1621–1622) ===
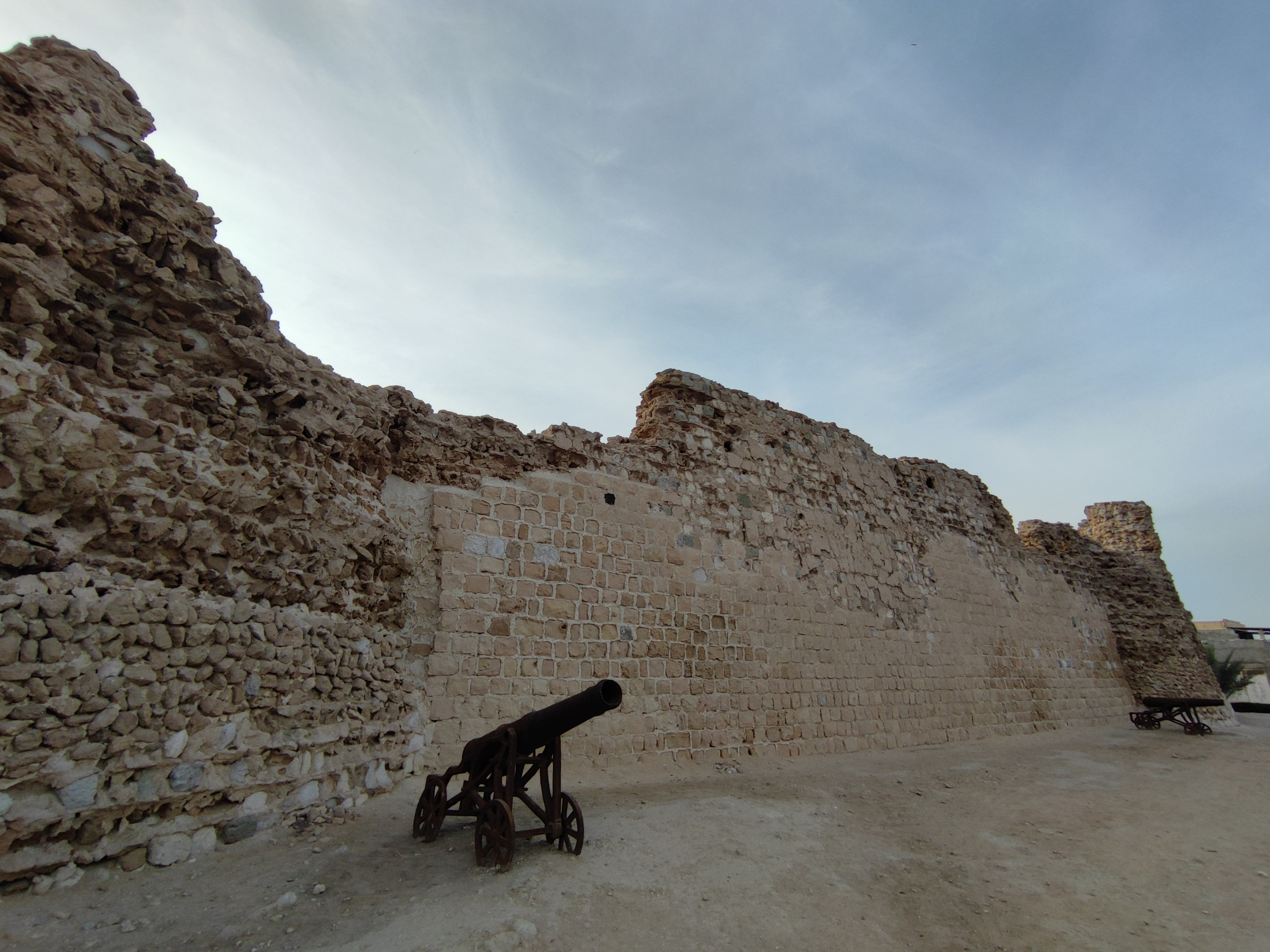
Portuguese castle in Qeshm

By late June Shah Abbas I learned of the fort's construction. According to English reports, the Shah regarded the fort as a casus belli and declared his intention to expel the Portuguese from Hormuz and Qeshm. Although he initially attempted to avoid war by sending an Augustinian envoy to Hormuz, Shah Abbas eventually dispatched a force of 10,000 men under Abdullah Khan to Qeshm.

Initially, the siege caused the Portuguese no major issues, they were free to sail the waters around Hormuz and even conducted a raid on the Safavid fort at Laft. The situation changed, however, upon the arrival of the English squadron. After negotiations between Rui Freire de Andrade and Commander Edward Monnox failed, the English bombarded the fort, forcing the Portuguese to surrender. Freire was arrested, having been delayed by his own hesitation to capitulate.

=== The escape of Rui Freire de Andrade ===
After the fortress of Qeshm had surrendered, Rui Freire de Andrade was taken by the English East India Company into captivity aboard one of their ships, possibly the Jonas, along with a number of other POWs. He was later transferred to the Lion, which then set sail to Surat, where Andrade and the Portuguese were to be shipped off to England. Yet Andrade was exceptionally well treated by the English crew, who admired him, from the ship master James Beversham to the cook, Thomas Winterbourne, who cooked exquisite meals for him. The English intended to hold Andrade as a prisoner until they could exchange him for a number of sailors held at Macau since a ship had been lost there in 1619.

Upon arriving on Surat, however, the English learnt that all Europe-bound vessels had already departed, and only two or three English merchantships were to be found anchored just outside the Tapti rivermouth. Andrade would enact a daring escape from there.

Andrade offered the English crew an Easter Sunday feast and obtained permission to send a few of his servants or slaves ashore to buy food and drink. One of them was secretly instructed to spike some of the wine bottles with a sleeping drug however. Inducing the crew to partake liberally, they were reduced to a state of coma. After the dinner in the middle of the night, Andrade and three companions lowered themselves onto the Lions longboat or skiff through a rope and rowed to shore.

Some sailors detected the Portuguese as they fled and sounded off the alarm, but although the crews of the other vessels set out in pursuit in their longboats, but they were unable to recapture Andrade and his party before they jumped overboard and swam ashore under cover of the darkness, though one drowned. The governor of Surat sent out some cavalry to help the English scour the countryside but the fugitives eluded recapture.

They then walked to the Portuguese fortified city of Daman several dozens of kilometers to the south, which they reached by 10 o' clock the following morning and were given a celebrated welcome. Andrade and his companions were given horses, on which they rode to neighboring Bassein. The commander of the garrison assigned a galliot and 50 soldiers to Andrade, who promptly set out to the Persian Gulf once more. During the voyage, he intercepted three ships of Portuguese pepper smugglers, but he convinced them to join him in exchange for a pardon.

The Persians meanwhile had already begun the siege of Hormuz.

=== Fall of Hormuz (1622) ===
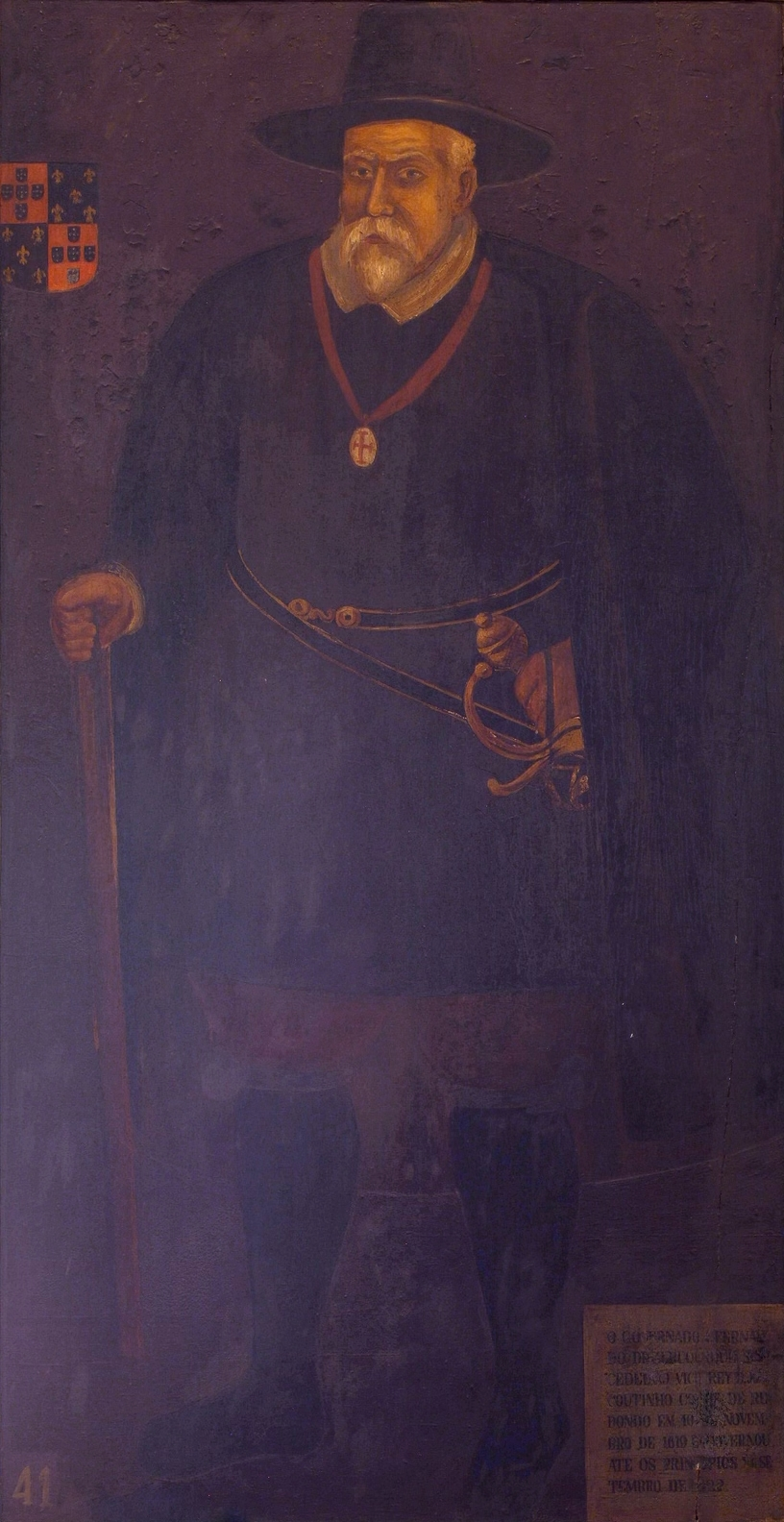
Portrait of Fernão de Albuquerque in the Archaeological Survey of India, Goa

Upon hearing of the fall of Qeshm and the siege of Hormuz, the Governor of Portuguese India, Fernão de Albuquerque, dispatched a relief squadron of 17 light vessels under Constantino de Sá de Noronha in March 1622. However, Noronha showed little urgency, and after his fleet was scattered by a storm, he anchored in Muscat where he was joined by Andrade.

On 9 February, six English ships and 200 boats carrying 3,000 Safavid troops, led by Imam Quli Khan, arrived at Hormuz. While the Safavids attacked the side of the city, the English bombarded the fort. The English successfully destroyed every Portuguese ship anchored at Hormuz and blockaded any aid from Goa.

In the ensuing war, Portugal lost Hormuz in 4 May 1622, and Persian forces invaded Oman to occupy Sohar. Upon surrender, the last king of Hormuz, Mohammed Shah IV, was held by Imam Quli Khan and sent to Isfahan under orders of Shah Abbas. However, Abbas failed to get English assistance to take Muscat, and the Dutch remained uninterested in supporting the Shah's expansion in exchange for commercial privileges.

The loss of Hormuz was a major psychological blow, as it had been one of Afonso de Albuquerque's conquests. However, it did not lead to the collapse of the Estado da Índia, nor did it end the conflict. According to Sanjay Subrahmanyam, the significance of the fall of Hormuz has often been exaggerated, noting that the Portuguese retained Muscat and later gained rights over Kong under Shah Safi.

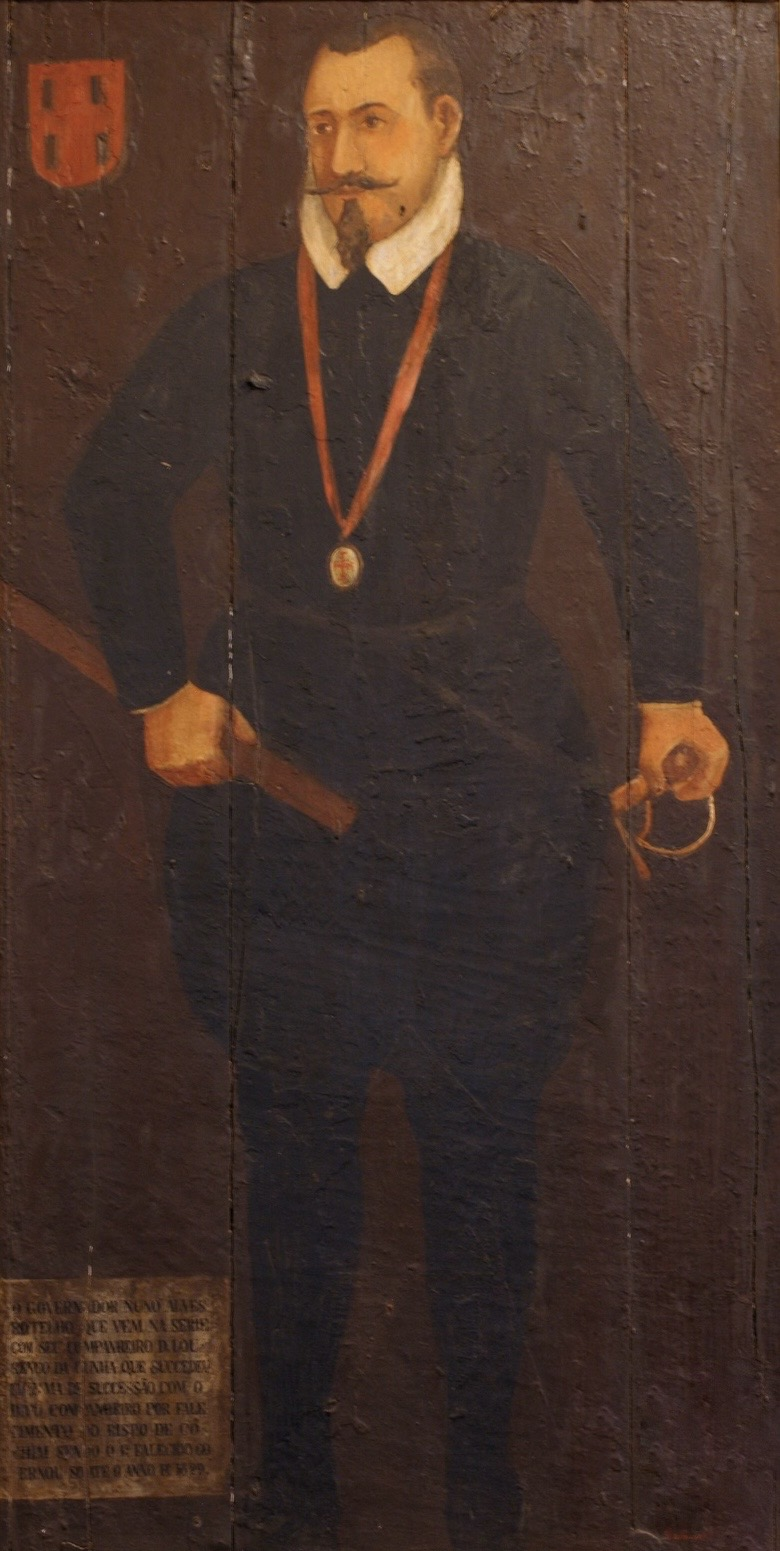
Portrait of Nuno Álvares Botelho in the Archaeological Survey of India, Goa

Even before its fall, contemporaries were already questioning the strategic importance of Hormuz. In a memorandum dated 10 February 1623, João Corte Real claimed that the island had outlived its usefulness. Once Persia had conquered the surrounding coast, Hormuz could no longer sustain itself, and Muscat offered a far safer base for navigation. Hormuz, according to Corte Real, was no longer worth reconquering.

Nevertheless, authorities in Goa responded with warships led by Rui Freire de Andrade and Nuno Álvares Botelho to "scour" the Persian Gulf, where they raided Persian shipping and burned coastal ports which the Persians were unable to defend because they lacked a fleet.

Despite the willingness of Spain, Portugal and the Estado da Índia to assemble a joint Luso-Castilian fleet to reclaim Hormuz, the enterprise was never carried out. In the subsequent attempts to recover the fort, Portugal and the Estado da Índia had to finance the effort alone.

=== Siege of Muscat (1622–1623) ===
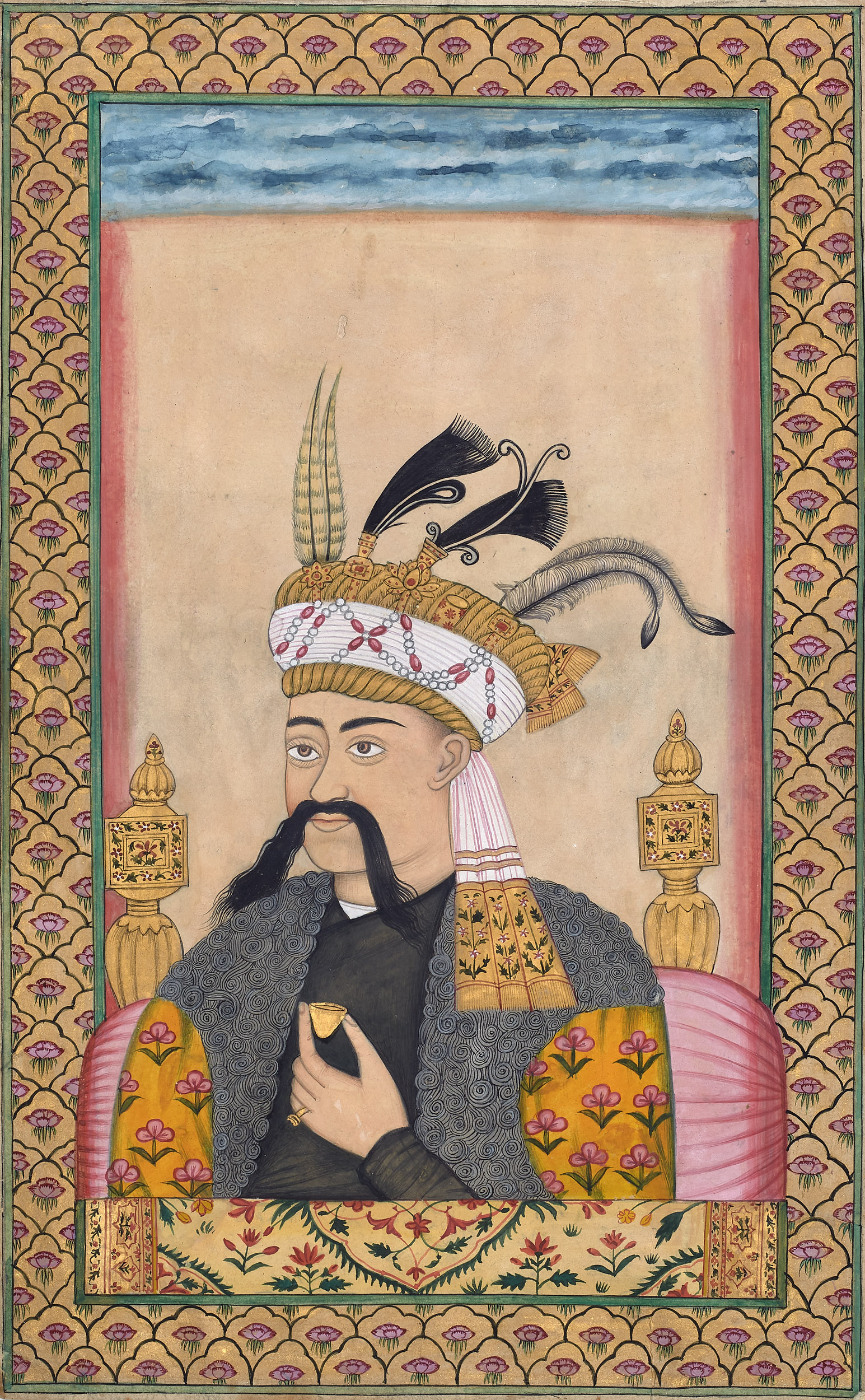
Portrait of Imam Quli Khan, made in Hyderabad, c. 1760-80

In the winter of 1622–23, Imam Quli Khan attempted to attack Muscat, seeking to follow up on the previous year's success. Despite being denied English naval support, the Khan moved forward with the help of Arab allies, but his force was quickly repelled upon the arrival of commander Rui Freire de Andrade.

Rui Freire immediately transitioned to the offensive, raiding coastal towns that supported the Persians before initiating a siege of Hormuz.

=== Portuguese "Arabian War" (1623–1624) ===
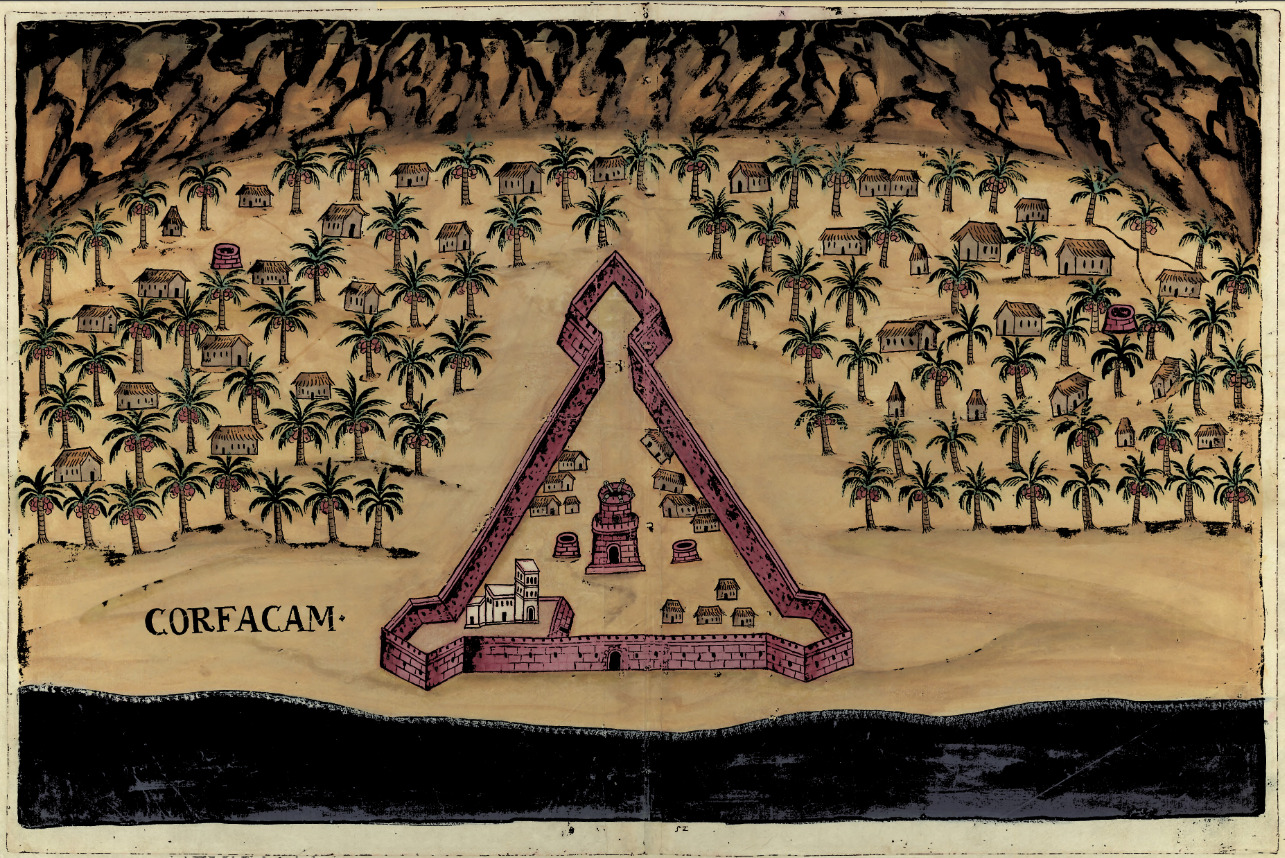
Portuguese fortress of Khor Fakkan

In 1622, the Safavids successfully seized Khor Fakkan, but their success was short lived.

In May 1623, D. Gonçalo da Silveira was dispatched with nine ships to run the coast of Arabia. After Easter, he and his fleet left Muscat and encountered the Safavid fleet at Khor Fakkan. The Portuguese were on the verge of winning the ensuing battle when an accident occurred aboard the commander's ship, allowing the Safavid ships to withdraw. Nevertheless, the Safavids were successfully driven from the region, and a garrison of Lascarins was left in place.

The Safavid army was ordered to withdraw to Julfar, which was considered safer from Portuguese naval raids. The Safavids did not believe they could maintain control over the region and thus "retired with their fleet to Persia, abandoning to him all the fortresses that they had on the coast of Arabia Felix, leaving only that of Soar garrisoned".

In the meantime, Silveira met with the main fleet under Freire de Andrade and sailed for Sohar. Freire de Andrade had with him 20 galliots and 10 Lascarin tarranquins with a crew of 1,000 Portuguese and reinforced by 15,000 men gathered by their ally, the Imam of Nizwa.

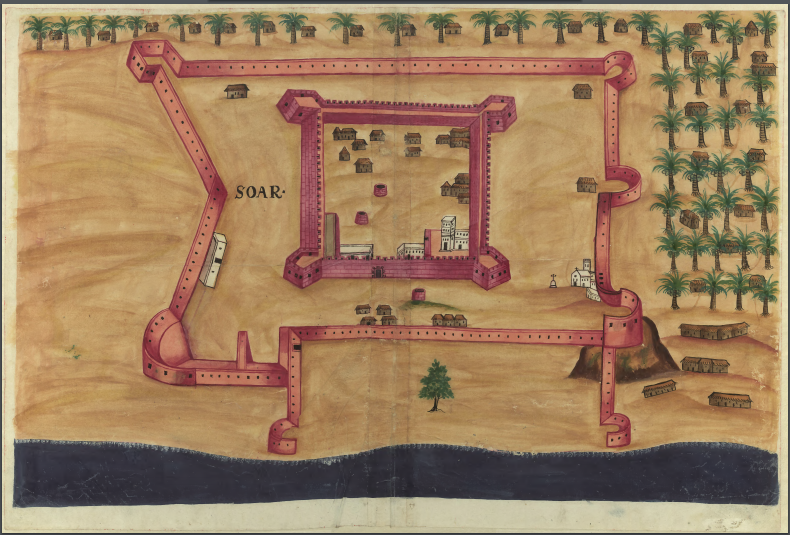
Portuguese fortress of Sohar

Upon arrival, Andrade demand surrender, suggesting favorable terms. After the Persian captain, who had 2,000 men, refused, Silveira led the first assault, capturing a city wall while the second group distracted the Safavids elsewhere. During the street fighting, Silveira was shot in the shoulder by an arquebus. Despite his injury, he spent the next eight days working and maintaining guard to secure the fortress.

Once the city surrendered, the captives were allowed to withdraw into the interior of Oman, and a garrison of 100 Portuguese and 200 Lascarins was left there with the support of Mamude Manafer, king of that region. Andrade then appointed Silveira captain of the fortress in August of that same year, where he served until December.

In April, Andrade set sail with 20 galliots and 20 terranquins carrying 400 Lascarins to attack Lima. The fortress was built on a hill beyond the range of Portuguese artillery, and the Persian garrison of 400 soldiers fired at the Portuguese, killing eight. In response, Andrade ordered 300 Portuguese and 400 Lascarins under Manoel Cabaço to land on three sides and "put to the sword all whom they should find within the fortress".

The Portuguese destroyed the fort and massacred the population, losing six Portuguese and twelve Lascarins. Having secured the Arabian coast, Andrade then turned his attention to retaking Hormuz. Prior to this operation, he appointed Luis Martins Chicorro to attack Brahimi, which was burned to ashes and 2,000 Persians were executed.

In this way, the Persians were expelled from Arabia, and all the riverside settlements of the peninsula of Oman, formerly tributaries of the King of Hormuz, were returned to Portuguese control.

=== Portuguese expedition to Basra (1624–1625) ===
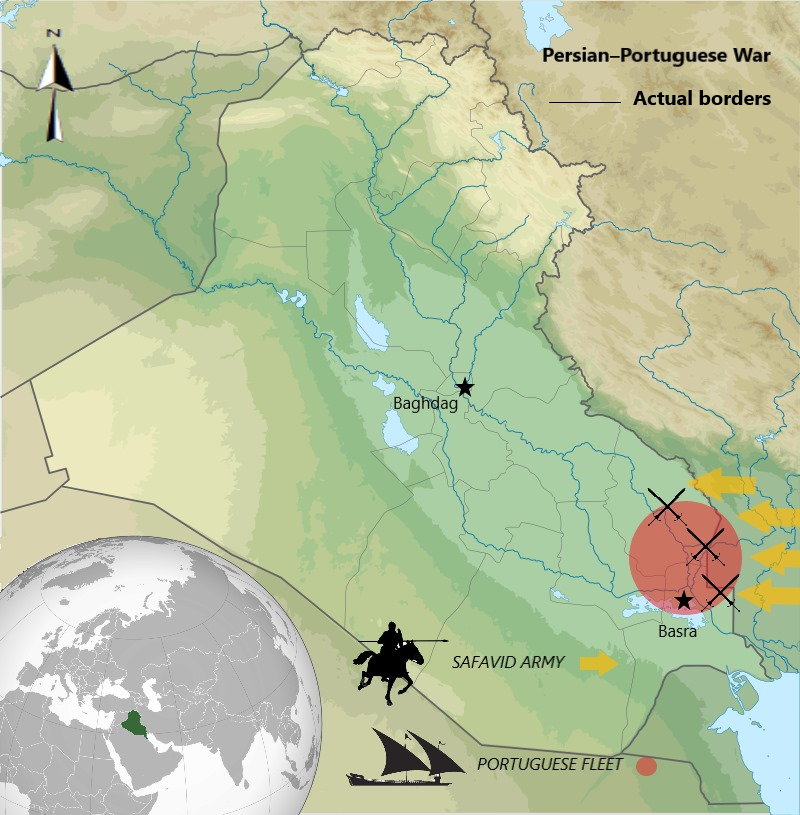
Battle of Eufrates in 1624, Portuguese protectorate of south Iraq and Portuguese territories of Kuwait

Following the capture of Baghdad, Shah Abbas I targeted Basra to weaken the Portuguese presence and trade. When the ruler, Afrasiyab, refused Safavid vassalage, Imam Quli Khan was sent toward the city.

Afrasiyab allied with the Portuguese, who sent five galliots under Dom Gonçalo da Silveira. The Portuguese fleet bombarded the Safavid camp from the Karun River and forced the Safavids to retreat.

Simultaneously, Rui Freire de Andrade allied with the local Sheikh of Qatif in an attempt to subjugate Bahrain. Although he successfully disrupted pearl trade, the Portuguese failed to capture the port.

By spring 1625, the Safavids launched another invasion with 30,000 men. But before a battle could take place, the Safavids retreated to attend other conflicts elsewhere. Gonçalo da Silveira remained in Basra until November 1625, when Andrade ordered him to rejoin the main fleet at Hormuz.

=== Blockade of Hormuz (1625) ===
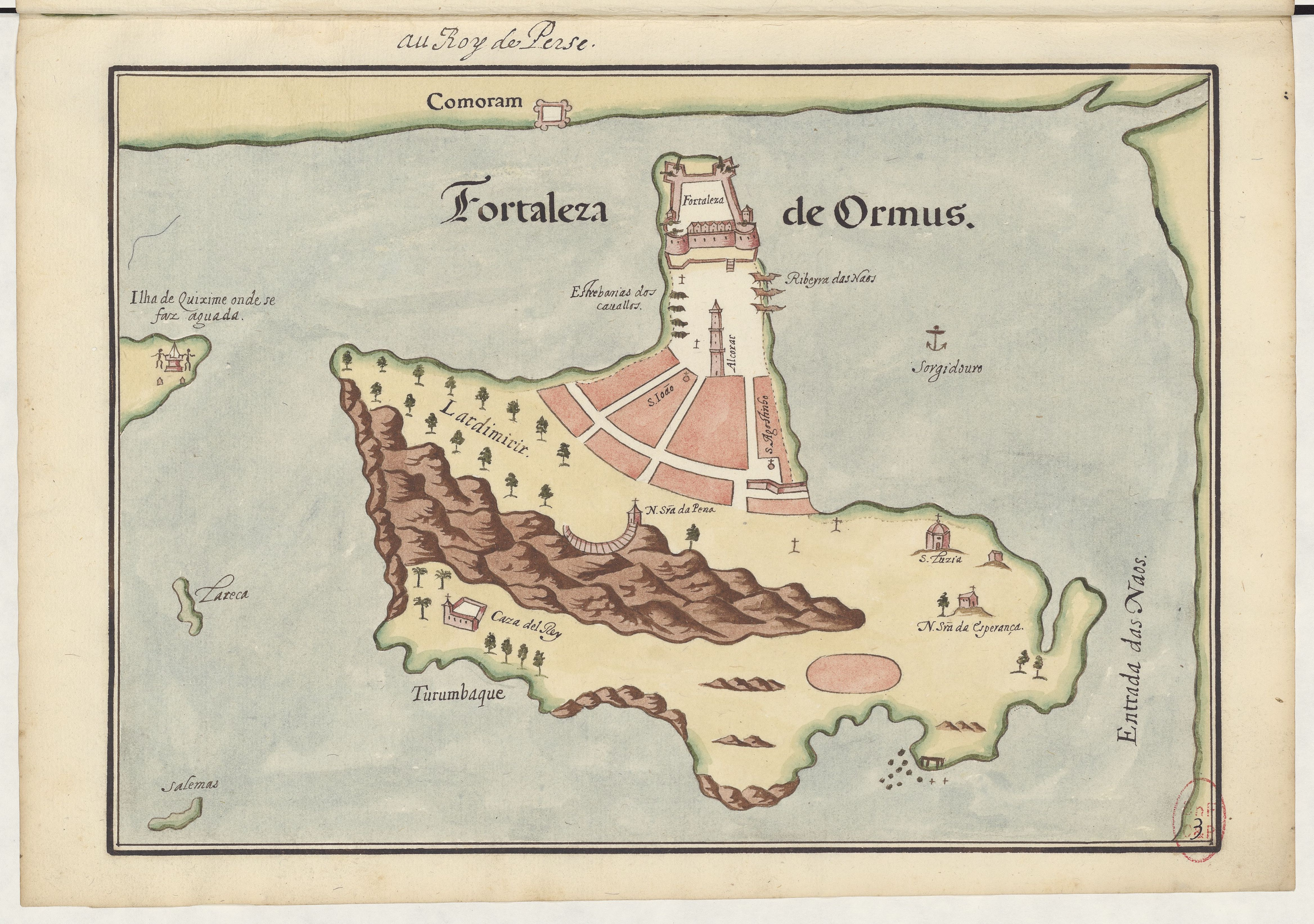
Fortress of Hormuz

Upon arrival in Hormuz, Andrade immediately dispatched 10 galliots under command of Luis Martins Chicorro, ordering them to remain off the point of Cauru. Meanwhile, six terranquins accompanying him were to run up and down that side of the island, while the galleons remained anchored off shore out of range of Persian muskets. The General proceeded with the rest of the fleet to the promontory of Our Lady of Hope, leaving four terranquins off Turumbaque. In this way, the General kept the city and fortress of Hormuz under such a tight siege for three months that not a single thing from Persia managed to get in.

One morning, the General saw an English ship flying its flag near Bandar Abbas. Following a fierce defense, the ship was destroyed by fire and explosion, and all but one of her crew were executed.

Despite the three-month blockade and the Safavid inability to supply the island, since no reinforcements arrived from Goa, Andrade was forced to lift the siege when an Anglo-Dutch fleet arrived at the end of 1625. Nevertheless, Andrade returned to Muscat "satisfied that if he had not neutralized the Safavid threat at least had bloodied the nose of Shah Abbas I". Ultimately, the Portuguese were unable to retake Hormuz, and all attempts to recapture it had ended by then.

=== 1627–1630 campaigns & raids ===
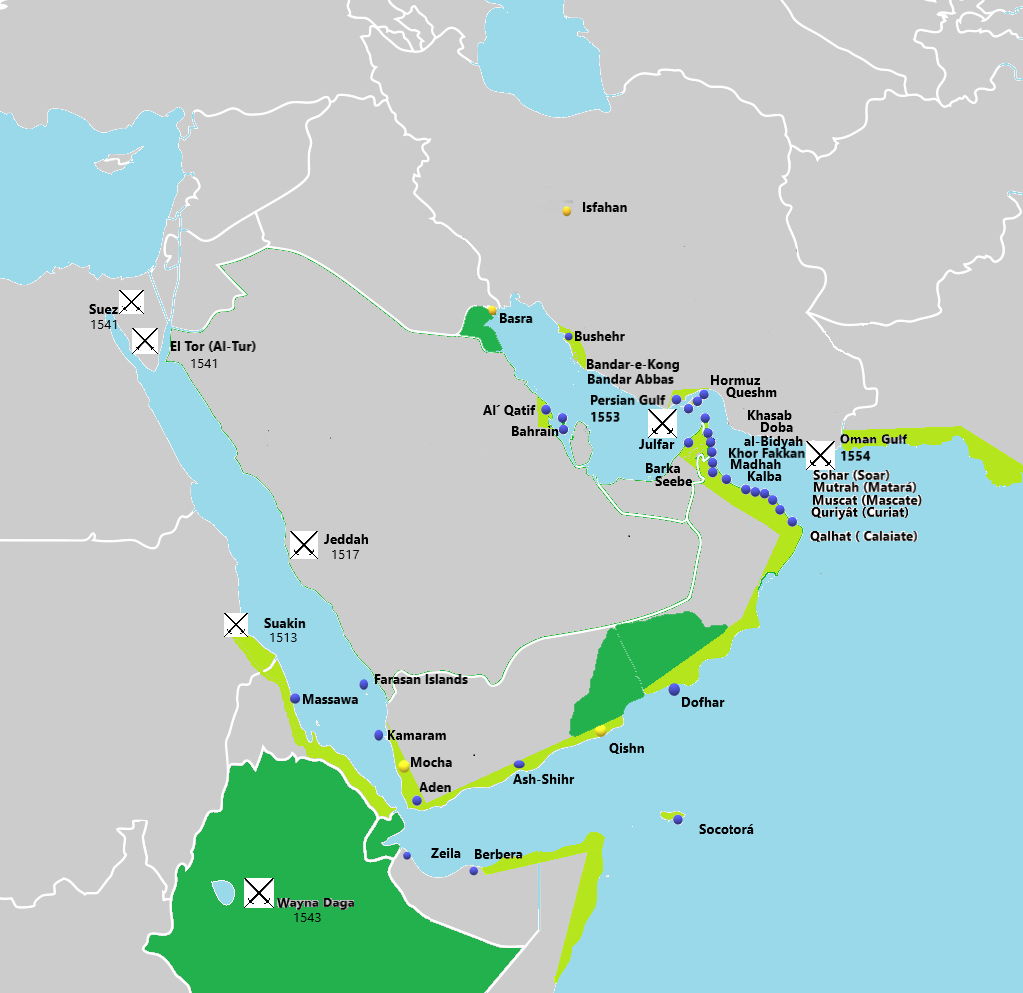
Portuguese possessions in Oman, Persian Gulf and Red Sea

After asserting control over Muscat and several smaller coastal ports in Oman, Andrade attempted another unauthorized attack against Bahrain in 1627. Using reinforcements from Goa intended to defend Muscat from the English and Dutch, he dispatched Gonçalo da Silveira with twelve galleys and several smaller ships. In September of the same year, five fustas and one war tarranquim under Silveira were deployed to rescue the Sheikh of Qatif from Safavid threats. The fleet remained in the region until April 1628, burning settlements along the coast of Qatar and attacking boats, but no major gains were made. At the same time, Ali Basha (Note: Basha of Basra, succeeded Afrasiyab in 1624 and ruled until 1645.) maintained his loyalty to Portugal, openly waging war against Persia by damaging what he could in Bahrain, while António Ferrão was sent to the Strait of Mecca as captain of five galliots to "wage therein the most ruthless war that he could" against ships without permit.

Later, the Portuguese attacked and plundered Qeshm during the winter of 1627–1628 or 1629–1630. This final major raid pushed Imam Quli Khan to begin ceasefire discussions. Between 1629 and 1630, the Portuguese also captured Gwadar, Julfar, Rames and Cate, and vassalized As Seed and Barka.

== Peace and aftermath ==
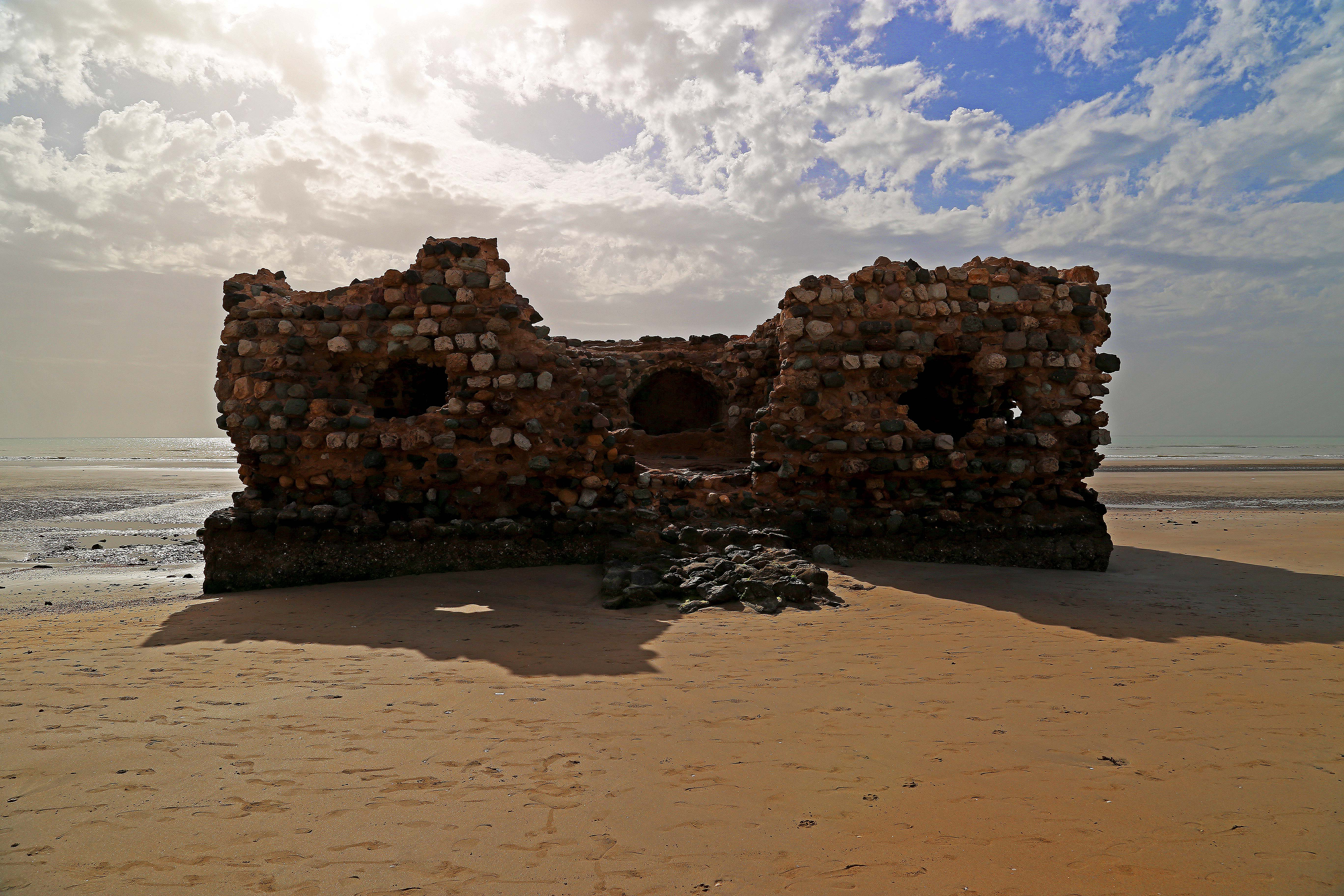
The Portuguese castle at Bandar Kong

Rui Freire's destructive raids gradually exhausted the Persians, so much so that by 1628, Imam Quli Khan had already begun negotiating truces with Rui Freire without Abbas's knowledge. Following the Shah's death in January 1629, his successor, Shah Safi, recognized European naval supremacy in the Gulf, and a peace agreement was settled in 1629–1630. (Note: Although the exact date of the agreement is unknown, with some sources suggesting 1625, most point to late 1630 or early 1631, which is the more likely.) Under its terms, the Portuguese agreed to end their "reign of terror" against the Safavid coast and shipping, while the Safavids were compelled to accept Portuguese maritime supremacy and the cartazes system established for free circulation.

In return, they were granted permission to establish a factory at Kong, receiving half of the port's customs revenue and the right to trade there on the same terms as the English at Bandar Abbas. They were also granted permission to found a garrison at Julfar. Imam Quli Khan agreed to pay tribute to the Portuguese for the continued use of Qeshm, though these payments allegedly stopped after the Khan's execution.

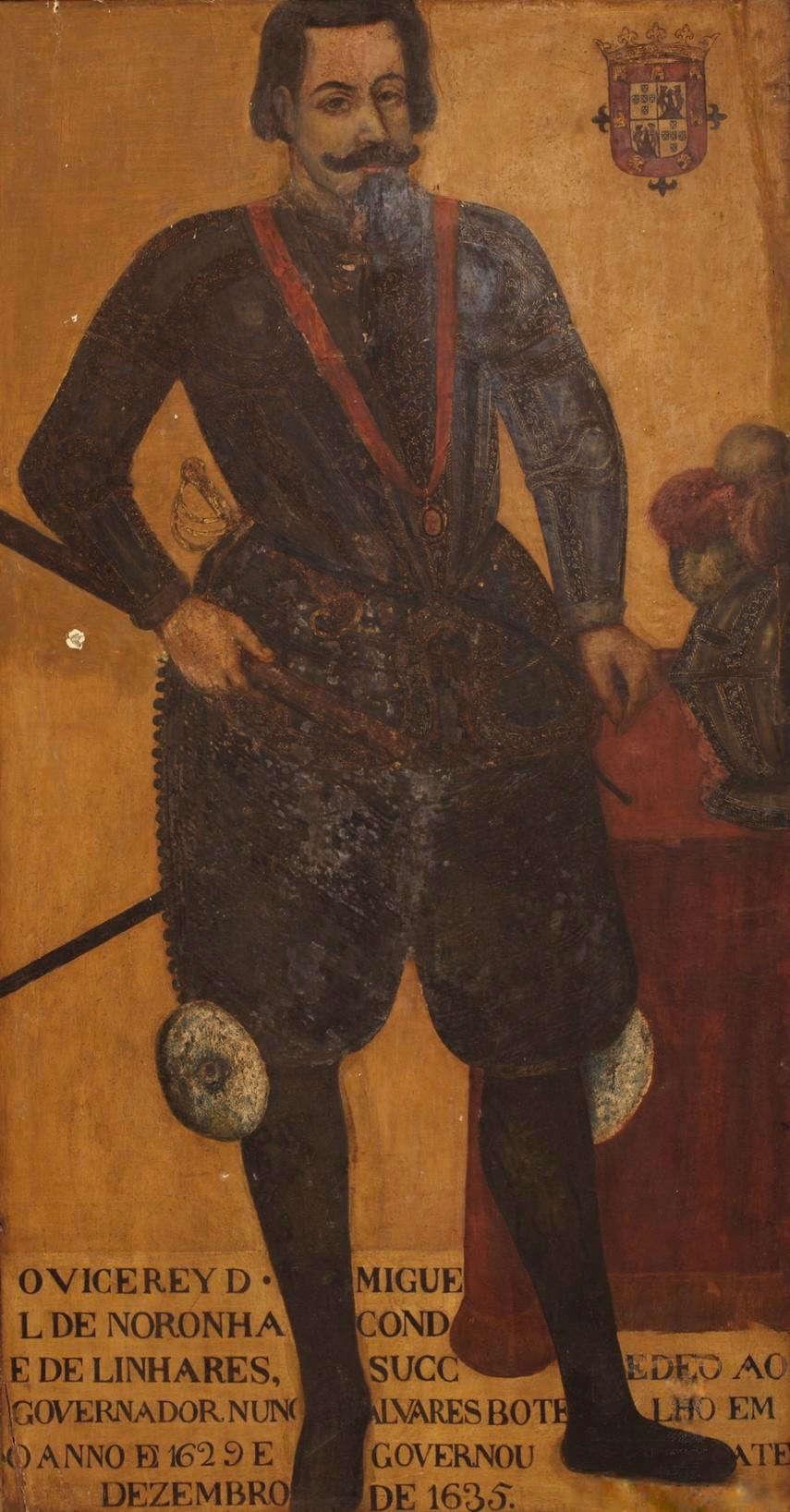
Portrait of Miguel de Noronha, 4th Count of Linhares in the Archaeological Survey of India, Goa

With peace established, hostilities temporarily ceased, and the Hormuz question was frozen for a time. The new viceroy, the Count of Linhares, felt that Andrade's presence in the Gulf was no longer necessary. Consequently, he recalled him to Goa, departing in October 1630.

According to historian Saturnino Monteiro, despite the achievements of Rui Freire de Andrade and Nuno Álvares Botelho, dominance over the Eastern seas had definitively passed into the hands of the English and the Dutch, noting that "Portugal's days as a great naval power had come to an end".

== See also ==
- Afonso de Albuquerque
- Portuguese conquest of Hormuz
- Portuguese Oman
- Anglo-Portuguese rivalry in the Persian Gulf
- Dutch–Portuguese War
- Ottoman–Portuguese conflicts (1538–1560)
  - Ottoman campaign against Hormuz
  - Battle of the Strait of Hormuz (1553)
  - Battle of the Gulf of Oman
  - Siege of Bahrain

== Bibliography ==
- Matthee, Rudolph; Flores, Jorge (2011). Rudolph Matthee; Jorge Flores (eds.). "Portugal, the Persian Gulf and Safavid Persia". Acta Iranica (52). Peeters. ISBN 978-90-429-2448-2.
- Floor, Willem M.; Potts, D. T. (November 21, 2024). Qeshm: The History A Persian Gulf Island. Mage Publishers Incorporated. ISBN 978-1-949445-86-2.
- Floor, Willem M. (2006). A political and economic history of five port cities, 1500-1730. Washington, DC: Mage Publishers. ISBN 978-1-933823-12-6.
- Matthee, Rudolph (2006). "Basra between Arabs, Turks and Iranians". academia.edu. University of Delaware.
- Steensgaard, Niels (March 15, 2017). The Asian Trade Revolution. University of Chicago Press. ISBN 978-0-226-77145-8.
- Boxer, Charles Ralph (1935). "Anglo-Portuguese Rivalry in the Persian Gulf 1615–1635". In Edgar Prestage (ed.). Chapters in Anglo-Portuguese Relations. Watford, Hertfordshire: Voss and Michael. pp. 46–129.
- Costa, Daniel Filipe Ferreira da (December 2020). The Wavering Power. The Portuguese hold on the Arabian coast of Oman 1622-1650 (Thesis). Universidade Nova de Lisboa.
- Ferreira, João Luís Fernandes (September 2011). Entre Duas Margens. Os Portugueses no Golfo Pérsico (1623-1653) (Thesis) (in Portuguese). Universidade Nova de Lisboa.
- Borges, Graça Almeida (December 2014). "The Iberian Union and the Portuguese Overseas Empire, 1600-1625: Ormuz and the Persian Gulf in the Global Politics of the Hispanic Monarchy" (PDF). E-Journal of Portuguese History. 12 (2).
- de Andrada, Ruy Freyre; Boxer, C. R. (2005). Commentaries of Ruy Freyre de Andrada. ISBN 9780415344692.
- Cordeiro, Luciano; Couto, Diogo do (1898). Dois capitães da India (in Portuguese). ISBN 9780415344692.
- Salman, Mohammed Hameed (December 1, 2004). Aspects of Portuguese rule in the Arabian Gulf, 1521-1622 (Thesis). University of Hull.
- Saturnino Monteiro, Armando da Silva (1994). Batalhas e Combates da Marinha Portuguesa (1604-1625) (in Portuguese). Vol. V. Lisbon: Livraria Sá da Costa. ISBN 972-562-323-1.
