= Afrasiyab =

Afrasiyab, Afrasiab, Afrosiyab, or Afrosiyob may refer to:

== Places ==
- Afrasiyab (Samarkand), an ancient site of Northern Samarkand (present day Uzbekistan)
  - Afrasiab Museum of Samarkand, a museum on the site
- Afrasiab, Iran, a village in Kurdistan Province

== People ==
- Afrasiyab dynasty, an Iranian Shia dynasty of Tabaristan (present-day Mazandaran province, Iran) 1349–1504
  - Kiya Afrasiyab, founder and first ruler of the dynasty, reigned 1349–1359
- Afrasiyab I of Basra, originator of the title The Prince of Basra in 1596
- Afrasiyab Badalbeyli (1907–1976), Soviet Azerbaijani composer

== Other uses ==
- Afrasiab, a sorcerer and emperor in the Persian epic Shahnameh
- Afrosiyob, the train service name of high-speed rail in Uzbekistan
