= Anglo-Persian capture of Qeshm =

1621–1622 conflict

Capture of Qeshm
- Part of Portuguese–Safavid War (1621–1630) and Anglo-Portuguese rivalry in the Persian Gulf
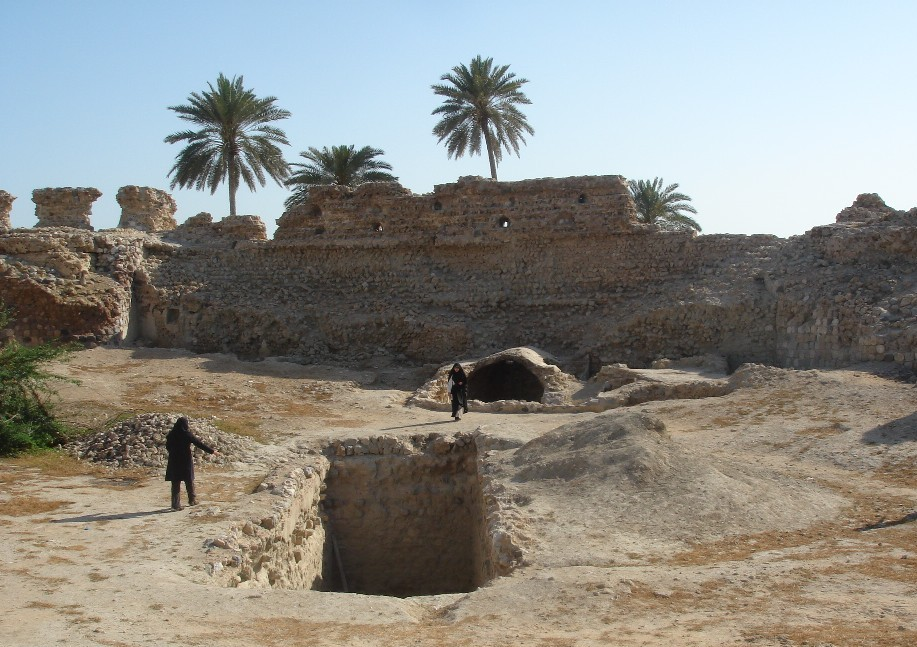
- Portuguese fortress of Qeshm
Date	June 1621 – 1 February 1622
Location	Qeshm Island
Result	Anglo-Persian victory
Territorial changes	Qeshm fort under Persian control

Belligerents
Safavid Iran; East India Company	Portugal

Commanders and leaders
Imam Quli Khan; Abdullah Hussain Khan; Edward Monnox; William Baffin †	Rui Freire de Andrade (POW)

Strength
25,000 Persians; 400 boats 9 English ships	3,000 men

Casualties and losses
Heavy	Heavy

The Capture of Qeshm was a combined Anglo-Persian expedition that successfully captured the Portuguese garrison at Qeshm Island after months of siege.

== Background ==
Philip III of Spain took measures to maintain the Iberian supremacy of Persian Gulf. In January 1619, he dispatched two naval squadrons to the region; one of them, led by Rui Freire de Andrade, left Lisbon with clear orders to drive the English off and secure Hormuz Island from a possible Persian attack. The force under Rui consisted of two galleons and three small vessels carrying 2,000 soldiers and 178 guns. He reached Hormuz in June 1620.

In December 1620, Shah Abbas tried to reassure the Portuguese about his dealings with the English, but the Portuguese in Goa realized that the English would not abandon their trade in the Persian Gulf region. A battle broke out on January 7, 1621, off Jask between Rui and an English fleet of four vessels, in which the English had the upper hand. After this defeat, Rui turned to his second objective, securing Hormuz from Persian invasion.

To achieve this, Rui had to build a fortress on Qeshm Island to secure the water supply to Hormuz. This project came at an unfortunate moment; the construction of a Portuguese fort in Qeshm provided an excuse for the Persians to attack the Portuguese. Shah Abbas protested against such action at Hormuz. Rui was warned of such action by Fernao de Albuquerque, the governor of India, or by Luis de Sousa, the captain of Hormuz. However, Rui ignored the warnings and insisted on building a fort, and this proved to be his first mistake.

== Prelude ==
On May 7, 1621, a Portuguese force of 2,000 men, supported by 1,000 Hormuzi soldiers, defeated the Persians there who attempted to oppose them. The Persians then assembled an army of 25,000 men, reinforced by 400 Arab boats, on the Persian coast. The Persians were led by Abdullah Hussain Khan, who had been sent by Imam Quli Khan who had been placed in charge of the campaign by Shah Abbas. While Rui was working on the construction, two galleons from Goa arrived ostensibly to assist him. The galleons were commanded by Manuel de Azevedo and John de Silveira. These two were rivals of Rui and brought instructions to moderate his aggression. Later, these two captains left the island.

Thereafter, Rui began raiding and sacking coastal cities such as Kong, Jask, and Julfar where he committed atrocities that caused outrage among the coastal tribes of Persia and Arabia instead of gaining the support of these inhabitants.

== Capture ==
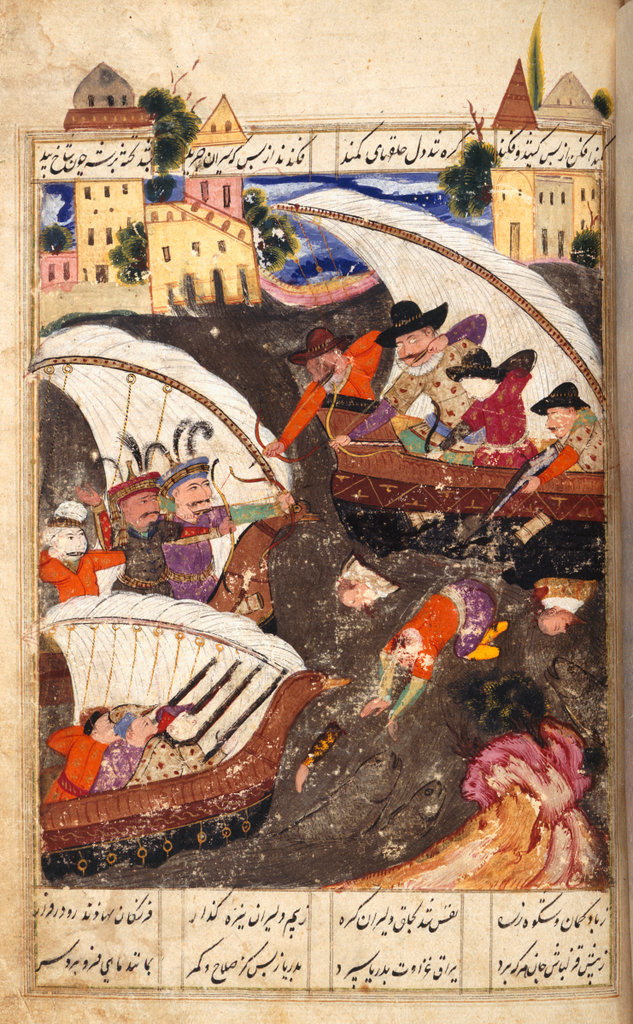
Imam Quli Khan's Persian soldiers in boats repulsed by the Portuguese at Hormuz.

The Persians besieged Qeshm for about nine months from June 1621 until February 1622, they sustained heavy casualties in several assaults and all of their efforts were proved to be in vain: the Persian commanders realized the fort would not fall unless they controlled the surrounding sea lanes. They decided to ask the English to assist them in the siege and a force of nine English vessels arrived at Jask from Surat on 26 December 1621, Imam Quli Khan used this opportunity to exert pressure on the English. He demanded that they help him in exchange for rewards but, at the same time, he threatened to withdraw all English trading privileges in Persia.

Rui ordered a Portuguese attack on Jask that destroyed the English station, this proved to be his second mistake, as it increased English hostility against them.

In spite of all this, the English agent in Persia, Edward Monnox, agreed to help. The English joined the siege of Qeshm in January 1622. Negotiations were held between Monnox and Rui at which Rui reminded Monnox that he was giving support to the Moors against Christian forces. Monnox reminded Rui of the destruction of the English station at Jask. These talks brought no solution: Rui refused to surrender, and the fortress was bombarded with little effect. However, the garrison, with the encouragement of its priests, rebelled against their leader and surrendered the fort in February 1622.

Rui was sent with his men to Surat as a prisoner but managed to escape to Muscat. The Lascarins' auxiliaries' fates were unfortunate; the Persians first promised them safety, but Khan massacred them like "a flock of sheep." Both the English and Persians broke the terms of surrender.

== Aftermath ==
The fall of Qeshm to the English-Persian alliance was important because of Qeshm's role as a storehouse of products to supply Hormuz. In addition, its fall was the first step toward precipitating a crisis in Hormuz because it deprived the garrison and inhabitants of Hormuz of one of their sources of water.

== Bibliography ==
- Mohammed Hameed Salman, Aspects Of Portuguese Rule In The Arabian Gulf, 1521–1622.
- Salim Abdul Ali al-'Areedh, Islamic rulings and their practical applications in British India and the Arabian Gulf.
- QESHM ISLAND, Encyclopaedia Iranica
