= Battle off Hormuz (1625) =

Battle for the control of the Persian Gulf trade

- Part of Anglo-Portuguese rivalry in the Persian Gulf
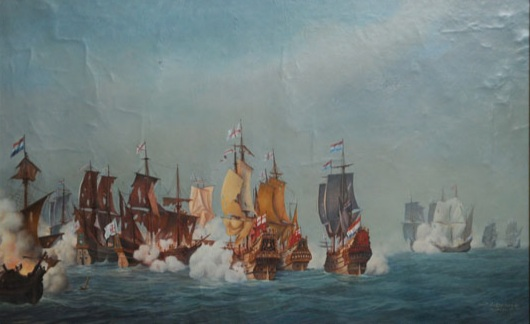
- Batalha Naval de Ormuz, by João Dantas, c. 1812.
Date	11–12 February 1625
Location	Strait of Hormuz
Result	Inconclusive

Belligerents
(Portugal) Portuguese Estado da Índia	(Kingdom of England) English East India Company; Dutch East India Company; Safavid Iran

Commanders and leaders
(Portugal) Nuno Álvares Botelho (Portugal) Rui Freire de Andrade	(Kingdom of England) John Weddell (Dutch East India Company) Albert Becker †

Strength
8 galleons 20 light galleys 20 terranquins	8 carracks 2 pataches

Casualties and losses
130 killed	29 English killed 45 Dutch killed

The battle off Hormuz or the battle of the Persian Gulf on 11–12 February 1625 was "perhaps the largest naval battle ever fought in the Persian Gulf". It pitted a Portuguese force against a combined force of the Dutch East India Company (VOC) and English East India Company (EIC). Although the battle was a draw, the result was the loss of Portuguese influence in the Gulf.

== Background ==
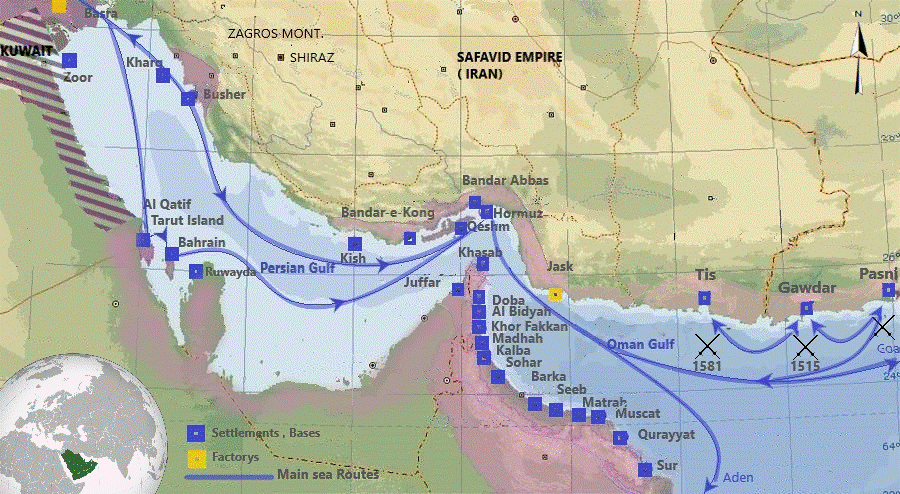
Portuguese in the Persian Gulf (1500-1750)

The Portuguese had conquered Hormuz in 1507 and ruled it as a vassal state until in 1622 it was conquered by Persia with English assistance. The Portuguese made several efforts to recapture the fortress of Hormuz in the following years. Rui Freire de Andrade, with a force of galleys under his command, was besieging Hormuz and awaiting reinforcements from Portugal when in early 1625 he was forced to raise the siege by an allied fleet of English and Dutch ships.

The Anglo-Dutch fleet had intelligence of the arrival at Goa of the Portuguese reinforcements under Nuno Álvares Botelho in September 1624. The allied fleet left Surat in India and arrived in the Strait of Hormuz in January 1625, forcing Andrada to lift the siege just weeks before the arrival of Botelho on 10 February. The Portuguese fleet consisted of the eight galleons of Botelho and a fleet of rowed galleys under Andrada. The Anglo-Dutch fleet had eight large and two small vessels.

== Ships involved ==
=== Portugal ===
- São Francisco 48 (Don Aliud Batellia) – 38 killed
- São Francisco 32 (Francisco Burge) – 31 killed
- São Sebastião 40 (António Teles de Meneses) – 20 killed
- São Salvador 22 – 41 killed
- Santiago 22 – 83 killed,
- Trindade 24 (Alva Botelia) – 24 killed
- Santo António 22 – 22 killed, sank later
- Misericórdia 22 (Samuel Rodriguez Chava) – 3 killed
- galleys

=== Allies ===
- England:
  - Eagle – 1 killed
  - Royal James – 13 killed
  - Jonas – 11 killed
  - Star – 4 killed
- Netherlands:
  - South Holland
  - Bantam
  - Maud of Dort
  - Weasope

== Battle ==
Botelho initiated battle early on 11 February. What followed was "one of the biggest sea battles ever fought in Asian waters during that period". According to a Portuguese observer, the exchange of gunfire was like the opening of the mouths of Hell and the Persians on shore were stunned. According to the English commander, John Weddell, the Persian governor of Bandar Abbas and the English agent in town watched the battle from their roofs. They counted 16–17,000 shots fired over two days of fighting, after which the fleets withdrew. Although many ships were heavily damaged, all were afloat.

Botelho rejected advice to retreat to the coast of Arabia, preferring to wait out his rivals in case they decided to attack Portuguese Muscat. The rival fleets lay at anchor—the Portuguese off Larak Island and the companies under the guns of Bandar Abbas—until later that month, when the companies decided to leave. (The guns of Bandar Abbas were the guns of the former Portuguese fortress on Hormuz.) The Portuguese sallied forth to engage them, but the fighting was inconclusive. Botelho then took the fleet to Muscat for repairs. He reported 130 of his men killed in action. The English and Dutch reported 29 and 45 killed in action, respectively. The difference reflected different tactics. However, including the previous encounters, the latter are said to have suffered 1,000 losses and three ships sunk.

During the battle, the English and Dutch enjoyed the "favor and help of three Persian fortresses", where they would retreat after the combat and "aided with everything they needed". The Portuguese spent their night laboring to repair their damages.

== Aftermath ==
Following the battle, Persia and Portugal signed a treaty that was, in effect, a truce that regulated their commerce in the gulf. It is generally agreed that the treaty was signed in 1625, but the surviving text is undated and it may have been signed as late as 1630. Portugal was permitted to select a Persian port in which to establish an emporium. Portuguese vessels were obligated to trade there rather than at Arabian ports and Portugal would receive half of the customs revenue. The Portuguese selected Bandar Kong. The treaty did not involve any cession of territory by either party.

Although the result of the fighting was inconclusive, the Portuguese achieved a strategic victory, morale increased to a high level, a lot of the old prestige was regained and finally, there was a temporary dominance of the sea by the Portuguese following the battle.
