= Sack of Bombay (1626) =

1626 conflict in Mumbai

- Part of Anglo-Portuguese rivalry in the Persian Gulf and Dutch–Portuguese War
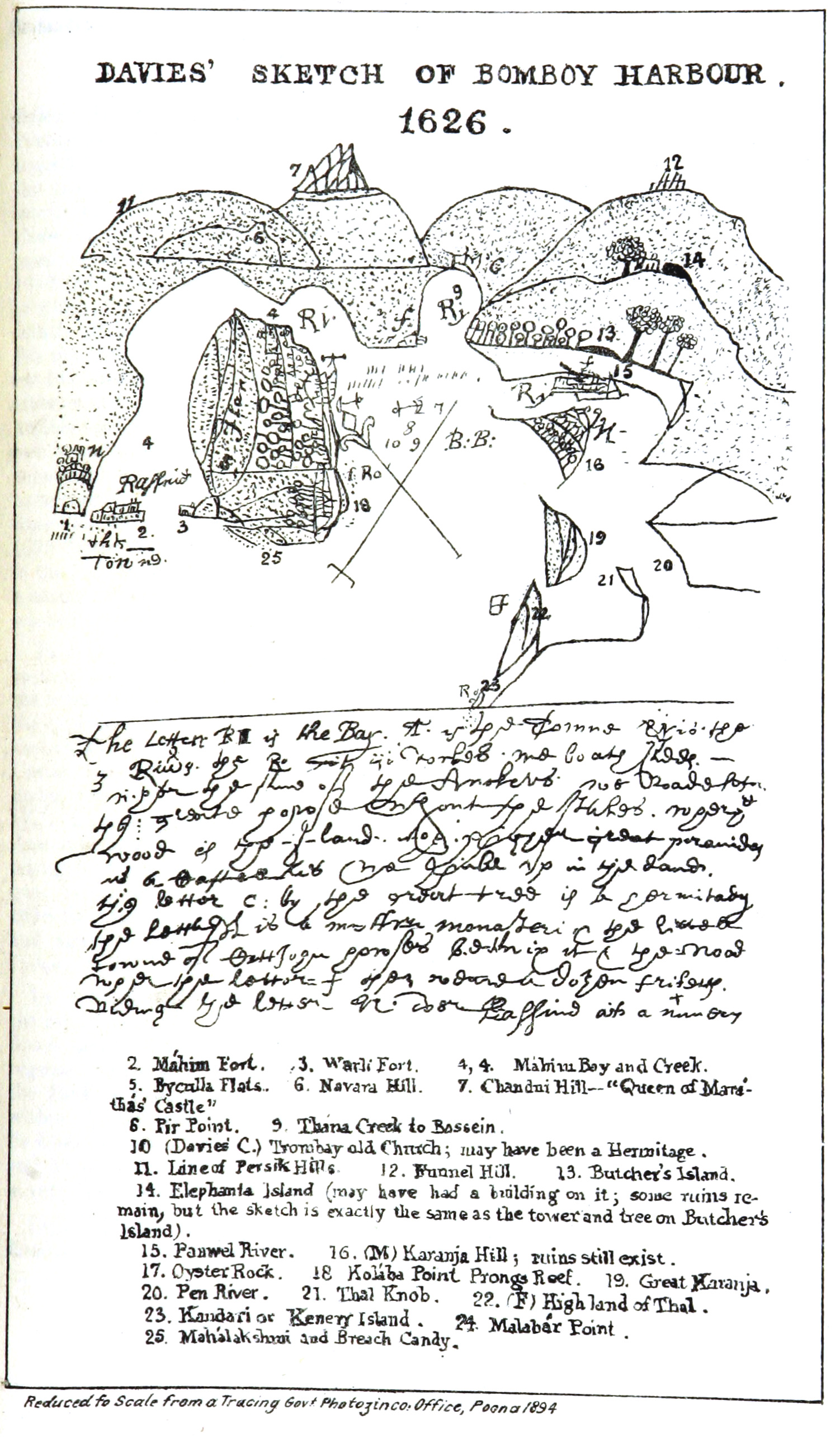
- Davies' sketch of Bombay harbour, 1626
| Date | 14–15 October 1626 |
| Location | Bombay, India |
| Result | Anglo–Dutch victory |

Belligerents
| (Portuguese Empire) Portuguese Estado da Índia | East India Company (Dutch East India Company) Dutch East India |

Commanders and leaders
| Unknown | Unknown |

Strength
| Unknown | 14 ships 300 men |

The Sack of Bombay (also known as the Bombardment of Bombay) was a short Anglo–Dutch raid on the Portuguese settlement at Bombay in October 1626.

== Order of Battle ==
Anglo–Dutch fleet:

- English:
  - James
  - Jonas
  - Anne
  - Falcon
- Dutch:
  - Goede Fortuijn
  - Bantam
  - Engelsche Beer
  - Gouden Leeuw
  - Walcheren
  - Heusden
  - Mauritius
  - Oranje
  - Hollandia
  - one prize ship

== Bibliography ==
- Boxer, Charles Ralph (1935). "Anglo-Portuguese Rivalry in the Persian Gulf 1615–1635". In Edgar Prestage (ed.). Chapters in Anglo-Portuguese Relations. Watford, Hertfordshire: Voss and Michael. pp. 46–129.
- Boxer, C. R., ed. (2014) [1930]. Commentaries of Ruy Freyre de Andrada. Oxford: Routledge.
- Grey, Charles (1932). Sir George MacMunn (ed.). The Merchant Venturers of London: A Record of Far Eastern Trade & Piracy during the Seventeenth Century. London: H. F. & G. Witherby.
