= Safavid invasions of Basra =

1624–29 Safavid campaigns in Iraq

- Part of the Portuguese–Safavid War (1621–1630) and the Ottoman–Safavid War (1623–1639)
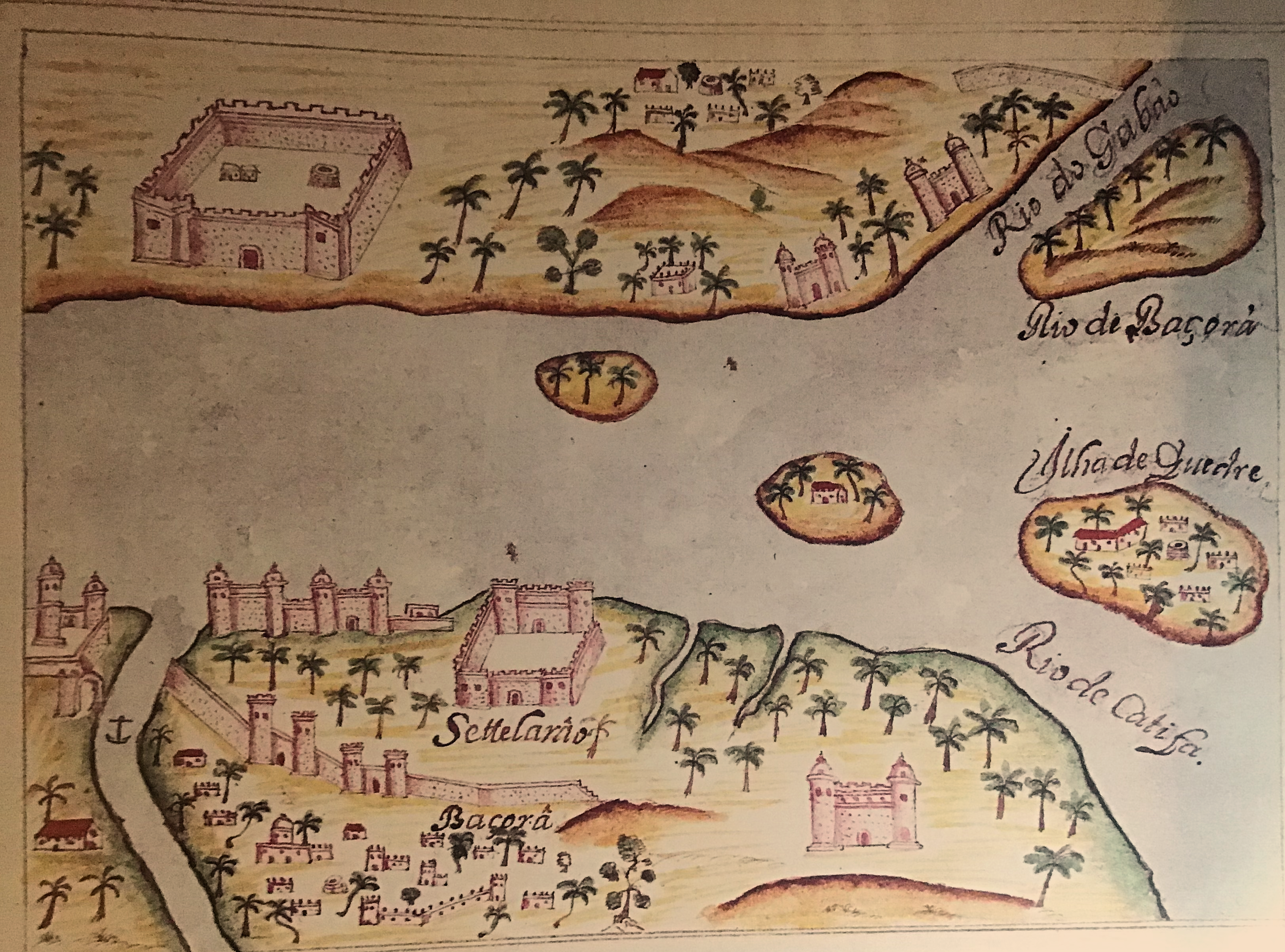
- Drawing of Basra by the Portuguese at the end of the 16th century
Date	1624 – 1629
Location	Basra, Ottoman Iraq
Result	Basran–Portuguese victory
Territorial changes	Status quo ante bellum

Belligerents
Pashalik of Basra; Kingdom of Portugal (1624–25)	Safavid Empire

Commanders and leaders
Afrasiyab I # Ali Basha; Freire de Andrada; Gonçalo da Silveira	Shah Abbas I # Imam Quli Khan

The Safavid invasions of Basra were a series of military campaigns undertaken by the Safavid Empire between 1624 and 1629, during their campaign in Ottoman Iraq, in an attempt to capture the city of Basra. Despite two attempts, the Safavids were unable to capture the city. Upon learning of the death of Shah Abbas I, the Safavids retreated, bringing the campaigns to an end.

== Background ==
Although Basra was a successful commercial city in the late 16th century, it struggled with financial challenges. By 1596, facing revenue shortfalls and unable to maintain local forces, governor Ali Pasha, (or Aiyud), sold Basra's government to Afrasiyab. Basra remained a hereditary eyalet under Ottoman authority until 1668.

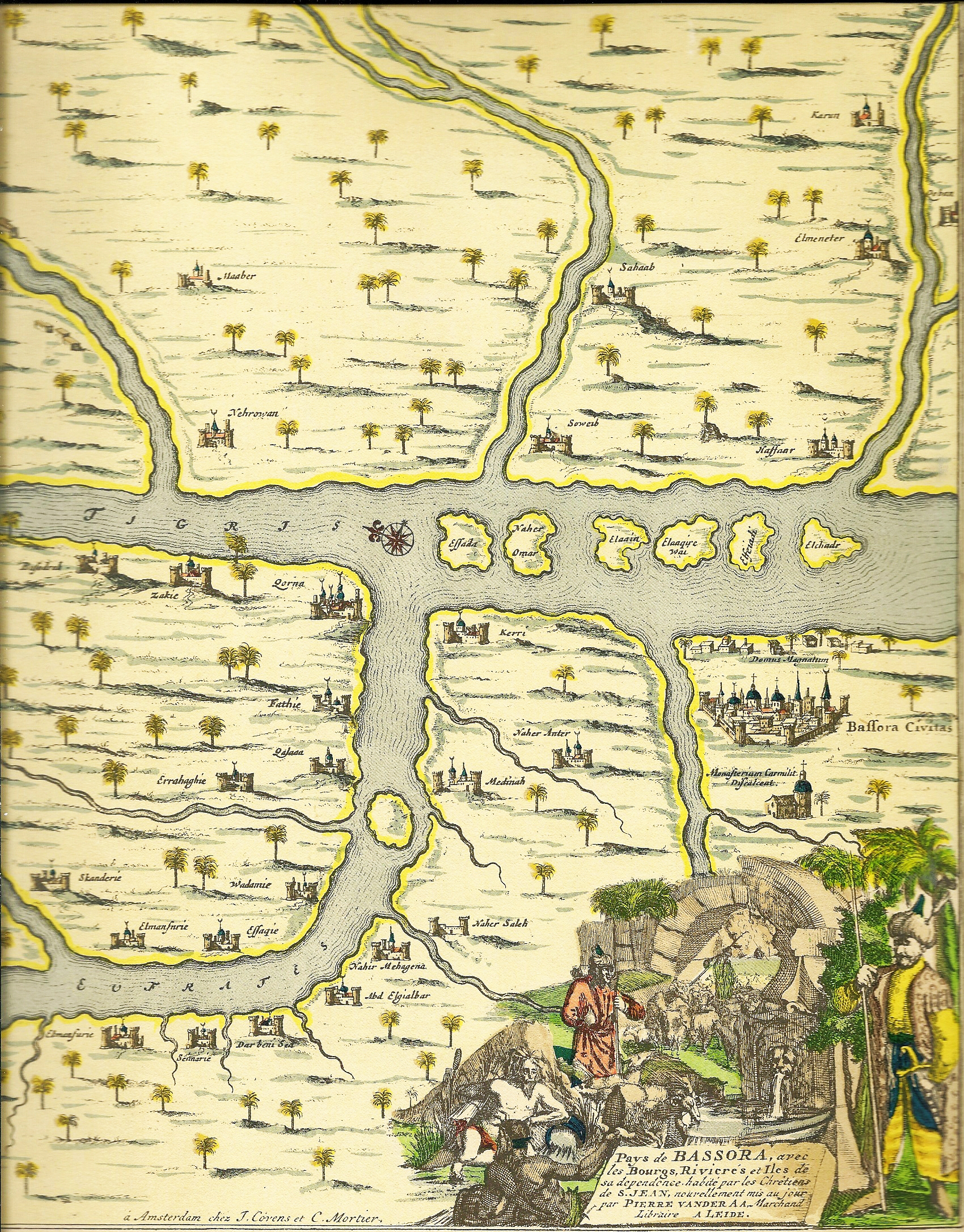
Map of the Basra Region, 1729

From the 17th century onward, Basra maintained relative peace under Afrasiyab. However, the nearby Musha'sha dynasty, under Sayyid Mubarak, was invading and occupying territories near Basra. Between 1594 and 1595, Sayyid Mubarak had taken over Dawraq, Dizful, Shushtar, and al-Jazair, and allegedly plundered the borders of Basra in 1597. From 1605 to 1611, Mubarak even sought Portuguese naval assistance to capture Basra, promising 30,000 serafins and half of Basra's customs money in exchange for 15–20 warships.

== Invasions ==
=== First Safavid campaign (1624–25) ===
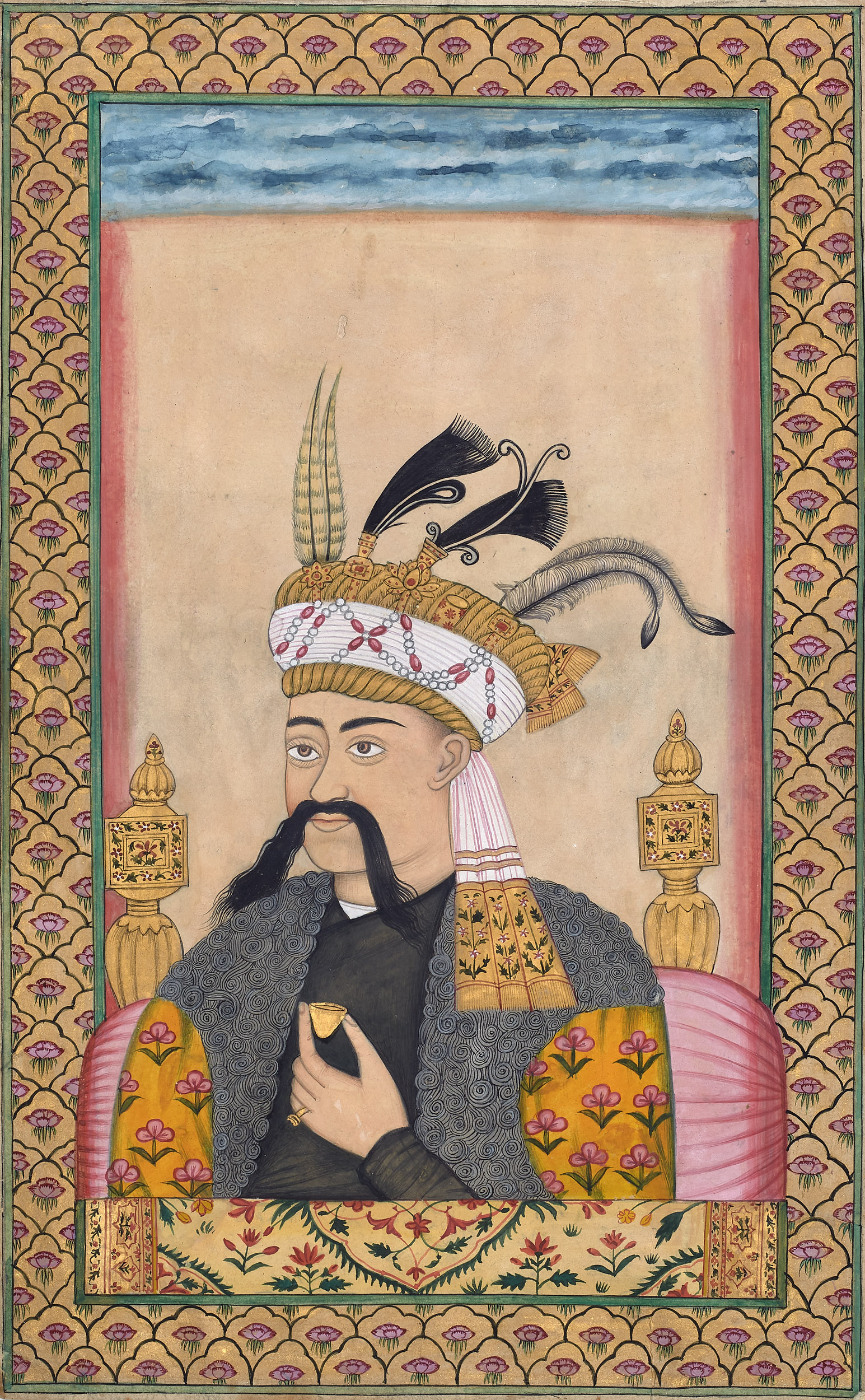
Portrait of Imam Quli Khan, made in Hyderabad, c. 1760-80

Following the Safavid capture of Baghdad in late 1623, Shah Abbas I made preparations to continue his campaign into Ottoman Iraq by targeting Basra. Motivated by trade and a desire to weaken the Portuguese, the Shah demanded Afrasiyab's allegiance, offering to maintain their autonomy under Safavid vassalage. When the proposal was refused, a Persian army led by Imam Quli Khan, the governor of Fars, was sent to Basra.

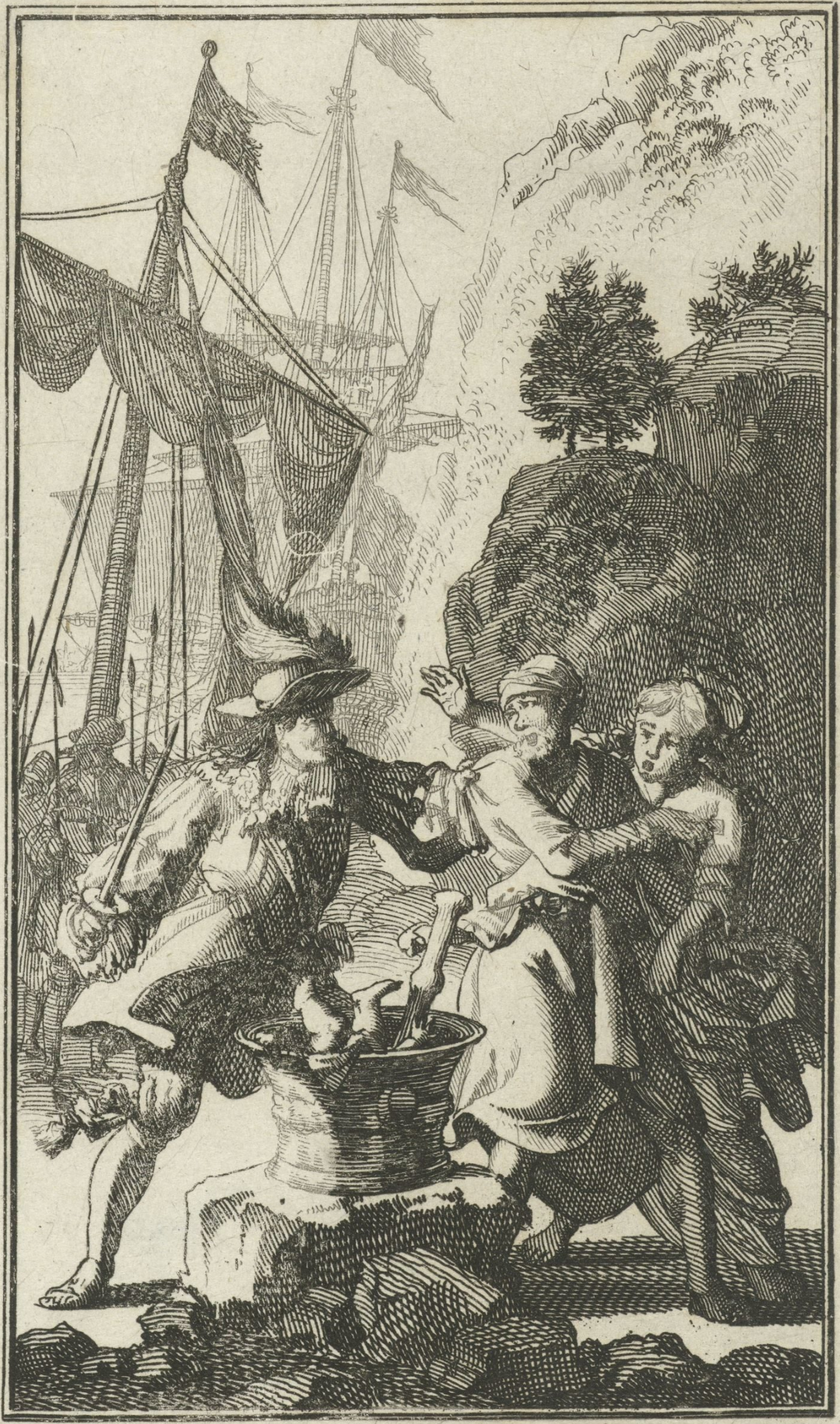
1689 engraving depicting Capitão Geral Rui Freire de Andrada landing at Qeshm, who had dispatched Dom Gonçalo da Silveira to assist in the defense of Basra

Before heading to Basra, Quli Khan and his army first subdued the Musha'sha capital at Huwayza. The intention was to punish and expel its ruler, Mansur b. Muttalib, whose ambition for independence from Isfahan had drawn him closer to Basra. Isolated from Ottoman bases in the north, Afrasiyab allied with the Portuguese for the city's safety and economic future. He requested six galliots, and in January 1624, five were sent under Dom Gonçalo da Silveira, who was then serving in the Strait as Capitão-Mor, accompanied by a fleet of merchant ships. His bombardment of the Safavid camp from the Karun River not only prevented the fall of Qubban, but also saved Basra from falling to the Safavids.

Afrasiyab died in the summer of 1624 and was succeeded by his son, Ali Basha, who ruled until 1645. During his reign, Ali expanded his territory by capturing the al-Jazair region and taking Kut-al-Amara from Baghdad's control. While Basra remained nominally under Ottoman jurisdiction, Ali Basha maintained reciprocal diplomatic ties by occasionally dispatching missions to Istanbul.

In January 1625, Imam Quli Khan urgently requested English support in his attack on Basra. The Company declined, stating their commission authorized action only against the Portuguese, not the Ottoman Empire.

In the spring of 1625, the Safavids sent a large force of 30,000 men after Ali Basha presumably rejected Shah Abbas's offer of vassalage. The Portuguese assisted Basra with 3,000 men and moved to Al-Qurnah fort at the Euphrates Tigris confluence. Other local Muslim and Sabean leaders also rallied to Basra. Before a battle could occur, the Safavids retreated to attend other conflicts elsewhere, particularly in Qandahar.

=== Second Safavid campaign (1628–29) ===
In late 1628, the Safavids once again marched on Basra, reportedly triggered by a rebellion against Ali Basha led by Ibn Ilayan. Although they seized several fortresses around Basra, the siege was abandoned after the death of Shah Abbas I in January 1629. Upon hearing the news, Imam Quli Khan gave up the siege and retreated to Isfahan.

== Aftermath ==
With the invasions repelled, Ali Basha secured control over al-Jazair and the trade routes connecting Basra to Baghdad.

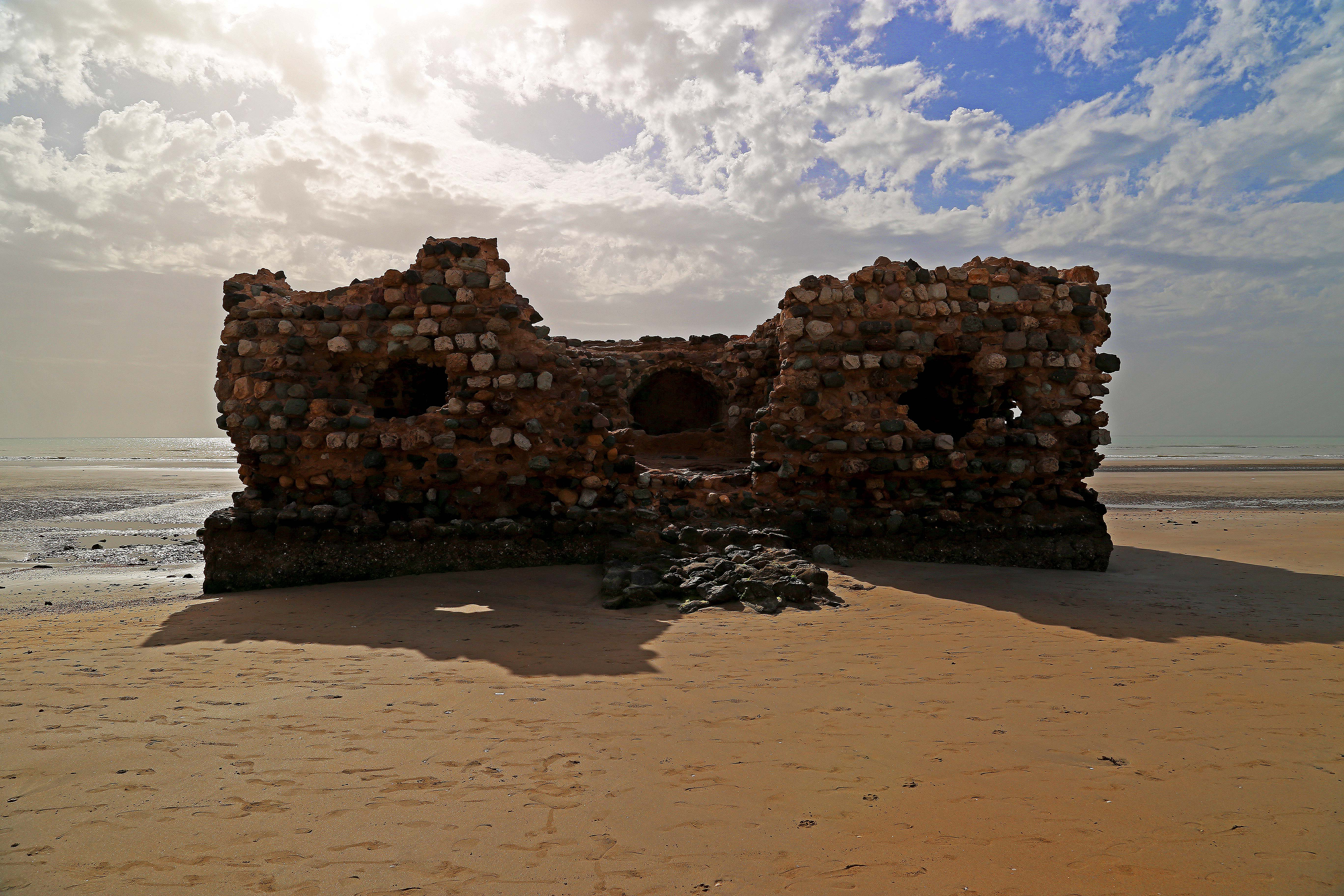
Portuguese castle at Bandar Kong

After Shah Abbas's death, Portugal, represented by Freire de Andrada, and Persia, represented by Imam Quli Khan, reached an agreement in 1630. The treaty granted the Portuguese monopoly over trade in Kong, with customs money shared between the Khan and the Portuguese. Although intended to shift trade away from Basra toward Bandar Abbas and Kong, the agreement did not limit Portuguese activity in Basra. On the contrary, activity in Basra increased after 1630.

Eventually, the Treaty of Zuhab was signed, ending the war and marking the end of Safavid-Ottoman hostilities. Shah Abbas's death subsequently came with the last Safavid attempt to capture Basra.

== See also ==
- Safavid occupation of Basra

== Bibliography ==
- Matthee, Rudolph (2006). "Basra between Arabs, Turks and Iranians". academia.edu. University of Delaware.
- de Andrada, Ruy Freyre; Boxer, C. R. (2005). Commentaries of Ruy Freyre de Andrada. ISBN 9780415344692.
- Cordeiro, Luciano; Couto, Diogo do (1898). Dois capitães da India (in Portuguese). ISBN 9780415344692.
- Steensgaard, Niels (March 15, 2017). The Asian Trade Revolution. University of Chicago Press. ISBN 9780226771458.
