= Loss of the Lion (1625) =

- Part of Anglo-Portuguese rivalry in the Persian Gulf
| Date | 17 October – 18 November 1625 |
| Location | Off Surat, India; Off Bandar Abbas, Persian Gulf |
| Result | Portuguese victory; Destruction of the Lion |

Belligerents
| (Portuguese Empire) Portuguese Estado da Índia | East India Company |

Commanders and leaders
| Nuno Álvares Botelho; Rui Freire de Andrade (Portuguese Empire) Gaspar Gomes | Captain Blyth; Richard Swanley †; Henry Crosbey |

Strength
| 4 galleons 14–20 frigates | 3 ships |

Casualties and losses
| 26 dead | 1 ship sunk 68 dead |

The engagement off Surat and the subsequent loss of the Lion at Bandar Abbas (also known as the Defence of the Lion) were two naval actions fought in 1625 between the Kingdom of Portugal and the English East India Company during the Anglo-Portuguese rivalry in the Persian Gulf.

On 17 October 1625, (Note: Willem M. Floor dates the battle to October 1626.) an English fleet was engaged by Portuguese forces under Nuno Álvares Botelho off Swally (Surat). The Lion was boarded, but after a prolonged fight, the English managed to drive off the Portuguese.

The Lion later arrived at Bandar Abbas, where she remained for several days. In 8 or 18 November, Botelho arrived from Hormuz with 14–20 frigates. (Note: 14–15 or 18–20 frigates.) Following a fierce defense, the ship was destroyed by fire and explosion, and all but one of her crew were executed.

== Order of Battle ==
Portuguese ships:

- São Francisco Xavier
- São Francisco
- São Pedro
- São Salvador

English ships:

- Lion
- Palsgrave
- Dolphin

== Bibliography ==
- Boxer, Charles Ralph (1935). "Anglo-Portuguese Rivalry in the Persian Gulf 1615–1635". In Edgar Prestage (ed.). Chapters in Anglo-Portuguese Relations. Watford, Hertfordshire: Voss and Michael. pp. 46–129.
