= Convention of Goa =

1635 Anglo-Portuguese peace agreement

The Convention of Goa was a local Anglo-Portuguese agreement concluded in January 1635 at Goa between the Portuguese viceroy of the Estado da Índia and the English administrator William Methwold, representing the English East India Company. The agreement brought to an end nearly a century of maritime conflict between England and Portugal in Asia, and facilitated English access to the East. In return, Portuguese merchants were permitted to trade aboard English ships, thereby avoiding attacks by the Dutch.

== See also ==
- Anglo-Portuguese rivalry in the Persian Gulf
