= Battle off Jask =

- Part of the Anglo-Portuguese rivalry in the Persian Gulf
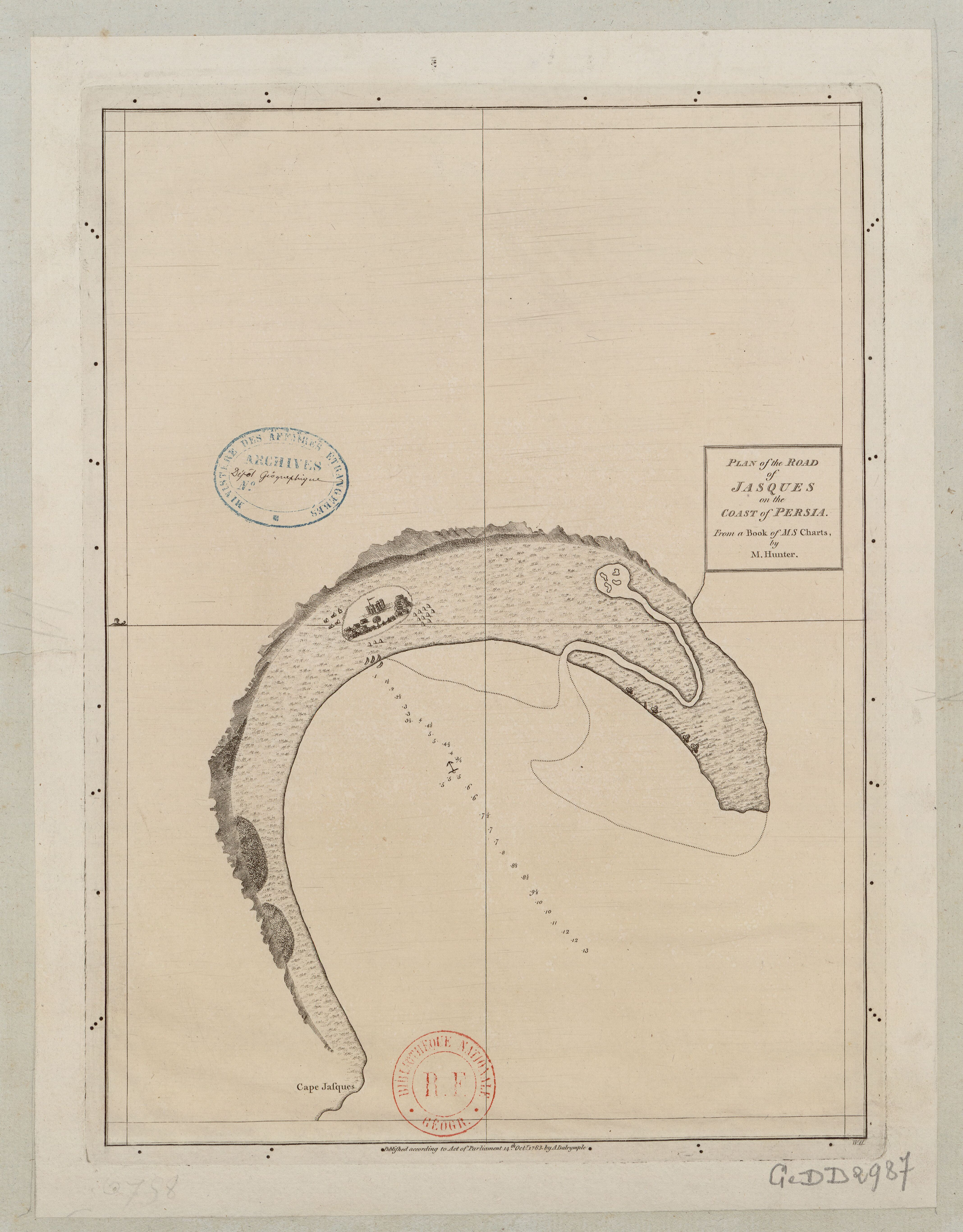
- Plan of the road of Jask
Date	16 December 1620 – 7 January 1621
Location	Off Jask, Persian Gulf
Result	Portuguese victory

Belligerents
(Portuguese Empire) Portuguese Estado da Índia	English East India Company

Commanders and leaders
(Portuguese Empire) Rui Freire de Andrade	Andrew Shilling (DOW); John Weddell

Strength
4 galleons and additional galliots 1,000 men	4 ships

Casualties and losses
160 dead 430 casualties	8 dead

The Battle off Jask was a series of naval engagements in December 1620 and January 1621 between the Portuguese fleet under Rui Freire de Andrade and the English East India Company ships under Andrew Shilling and John Weddell. It was the first military confrontation between two European powers in the Persian Gulf.

Later, during the Siege of Qishm, Freire ordered his naval squadron to attack Jask. The Portuguese and Hormuzi forces successfully plundered the town and the English factory, but the attack only intensified English hostility towards the Portuguese in the Gulf.

== Order of battle ==
Portuguese ships:

- São Pedro (64)
- São Martinho (48)
- São Lourenço (24)
- Nossa Senhora da Conceição (22)

English ships:

- Hart
- Eagle
- London
- Roebuck

== Bibliography ==
- Boxer, Charles Ralph (1935). "Anglo-Portuguese Rivalry in the Persian Gulf 1615–1635". In Edgar Prestage (ed.). Chapters in Anglo-Portuguese Relations. Watford, Hertfordshire: Voss and Michael. pp. 46–129.

Salman, Mohammed Hameed (Dec 1, 2004). Aspects of Portuguese rule in the Arabian Gulf, 1521-1622 (Thesis). University of Hull.
