= Andrew Shilling =

English naval officer in the East India Company

Andrew Shilling (c. 1566 – 1 January 1621) was an English naval officer.

== Biography ==
=== Early life ===
Shilling was born in Cley next the Sea, Norfolk and christened on 30 July 1566, the son of Henry Shilling whose occupation is unknown and Elie Michelson, sister of William Michelson (d. 1587), a sea captain based in Ratcliff, Stepney, Middlesex, late of Aldeburgh, Suffolk. Andrew Shilling was named after his grandfather Andrew Michelson (d. 1565), a ship-owner of Cley next the sea.

=== Career ===
Originally a petty officer in the Royal Navy, from this position he gradually raised himself to the higher ranks of the service, and on 30 May 1603 he became for life one of the six chief masters of the navy. In 1617 he obtained leave from the admiralty to take part in the fifth joint-stock voyage undertaken by the East India Company, and he sailed from Gravesend on 4 February as master of the Anne Royal, one of a squadron of five East India Company's Marine warships under the command of Martin Pring. On 6 February Maurice Abbot, Deputy-governor of the EIC mustered the men, paid their wages and the fleet left the Downs on 5 March. They arrived at Saldanha Bay (now Table Bay) on 21 June. On the voyage the fleet captured a Portuguese vessel from Mozambique, the Don Pedro de Almeyda, laden with a cargo of 50 quintals of elephants' teeth. The ships arrived at Surat in September 1617 whereupon on the orders of Sir Thomas Roe, English ambassador to the Mughal Emperor Jahangir, Shilling departed Swally for the Red Sea. He arrived off Mocha on 13 April 1618 and was successful in obtaining a firman from the local ruler for the English to trade there and at Aden. He was subsequently placed in command of the Angel, a vessel formerly belonging to the Dutch East India Company, and in it he conveyed home Sir Thomas Roe. He arrived in England in the autumn of 1618. The EIC immediately obtained leave from the Duke of Buckingham to employ him on another voyage. On 25 March 1620 Shilling sailed from Tilbury on board the London as chief commander of a squadron of four vessels.

During the voyage, on 3 July 1620, Shilling and fellow Company commander Humphrey Fitzherbert took possession of Table Bay and its environs in the name of the English King, James I to preempt any claim by the Dutch. Here they planned a plantation similar to that established by the Virginia Company at Jamestown. The settlement would have provided a revictualling stop on the way to the East but nothing came of the plan.

On arrival at Surat, Shilling despatched two of his fleet—the Hart and the Eagle—to the Persian Gulf, and followed them with his own vessel and the Roebuck. On the way he captured a Portuguese ship laden with a cargo of horses, and soon after met his other vessels returning, who reported the Portuguese to be very strong. Shilling, however, resolved to attack them, and on 19 December 1620 engaged them in the Battle off Jask on the coast of Persia. The first conflict was unfavourable to the English; but on Christmas Day the battle was renewed, and, though, owing to a calm, the London and the Hart were alone able to come into action, they completely defeated the Portuguese and compelled them to fly. Shilling, however, was mortally wounded, and died seven days later on 6 January 1621.

"Our worthy Admiral, in the beginning of the fight, received a great and grievous wound through the left shoulder, by a great shot, which hurt he with such courage and patience underwent, that it gave great hope to us all of his most wished recovery. But having, besides the wound, two of the uppermost ribs on the left side broken, this day, about noon, he departed this life, showing himself, as ever before, a resolute commander; so now, in his passage through the gates of death, a most willing, humble, constant, and assured Christian."

== Legacy ==
Shilling was the first person in recorded history to receive a published obituary when his appeared in a newsbook of 2 July 1622, some fifty years before the word "newspaper" was first used.

== Notes ==
1. The other ships in the fleet were the New Yeere's Gift, the Bull, the James and the Bee. The noted explorer William Baffin was aboard the Royal Anne as masters-mate.
