= Imam Quli Khan =

Imam Quli Khan (Persian: امام‌قلی خان or امامقلی خان) may refer to:

- Imam Kulu Khan, Governor and General circa 1580
- Imam Quli Khan of Bukhara (1582–1644)
- Imam Quli Khan (Safavid governor) (died 1632)
- David II of Kakheti (1678–1722)

== See also ==
- Imam Quli (given name)
- Khan (title)
