= Afrasiab, Iran =

Afrasiab
- Location within Iran
- Coordinates: 35°39′11″N 46°56′25″E
- Country: Iran
- Province: Kurdistan
- County: Divandarreh
- District: Saral

Population (2006)
  - Total: 333
- Time zone: UTC+3:30 (IRST)
  - Summer (DST): UTC+4:30 (IRDT)

Afrasiab (Persian: افراسياب, also Romanized as Afrāsīāb, Afrāseyāb, and Afrāsiyāb) is a village in Hoseynabad-e Shomali Rural District, Saral District, Divandarreh County, Kurdistan Province, Iran. At the 2006 census, its population was 333, in 68 families. The village is populated by Kurds.
