= Anglo-Portuguese rivalry in the Persian Gulf =

- Part of the Anglo-Portuguese relations and Portuguese–Safavid wars
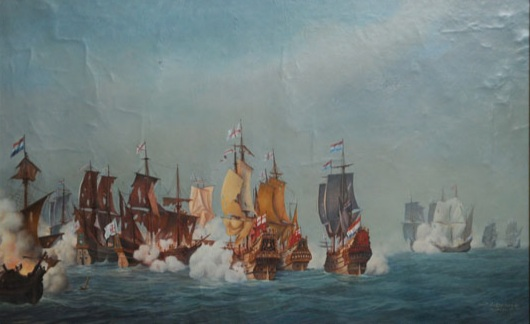
- Batalha Naval de Ormuz, by João Dantas, c. 1812.
Date	1615 – 1635
Location	Persian Gulf
Result	Convention of Goa

Belligerents
Portuguese Estado da Índia	English East India Company

The Anglo-Portuguese rivalry in the Persian Gulf was a period of military and commercial competition between the Kingdom of Portugal and the English East India Company. Lasting from 1615 to 1635, the conflict was a theater of the broader hostilities across the Indian Ocean, which began in 1602 and concluded with the Convention of Goa in 1635.

== List of battles ==
- Battle off Jask
- Anglo-Persian capture of Qeshm
- Anglo-Persian capture of Hormuz
- Battle off Hormuz (1625)
- Loss of the Lion (1625)

== Bibliography ==
- Boxer, Charles Ralph (1935). "Anglo-Portuguese Rivalry in the Persian Gulf 1615–1635". In Edgar Prestage (ed.). Chapters in Anglo-Portuguese Relations. Watford, Hertfordshire: Voss and Michael. pp. 46–129.
