= Rui Freire de Andrade =

Portuguese soldier

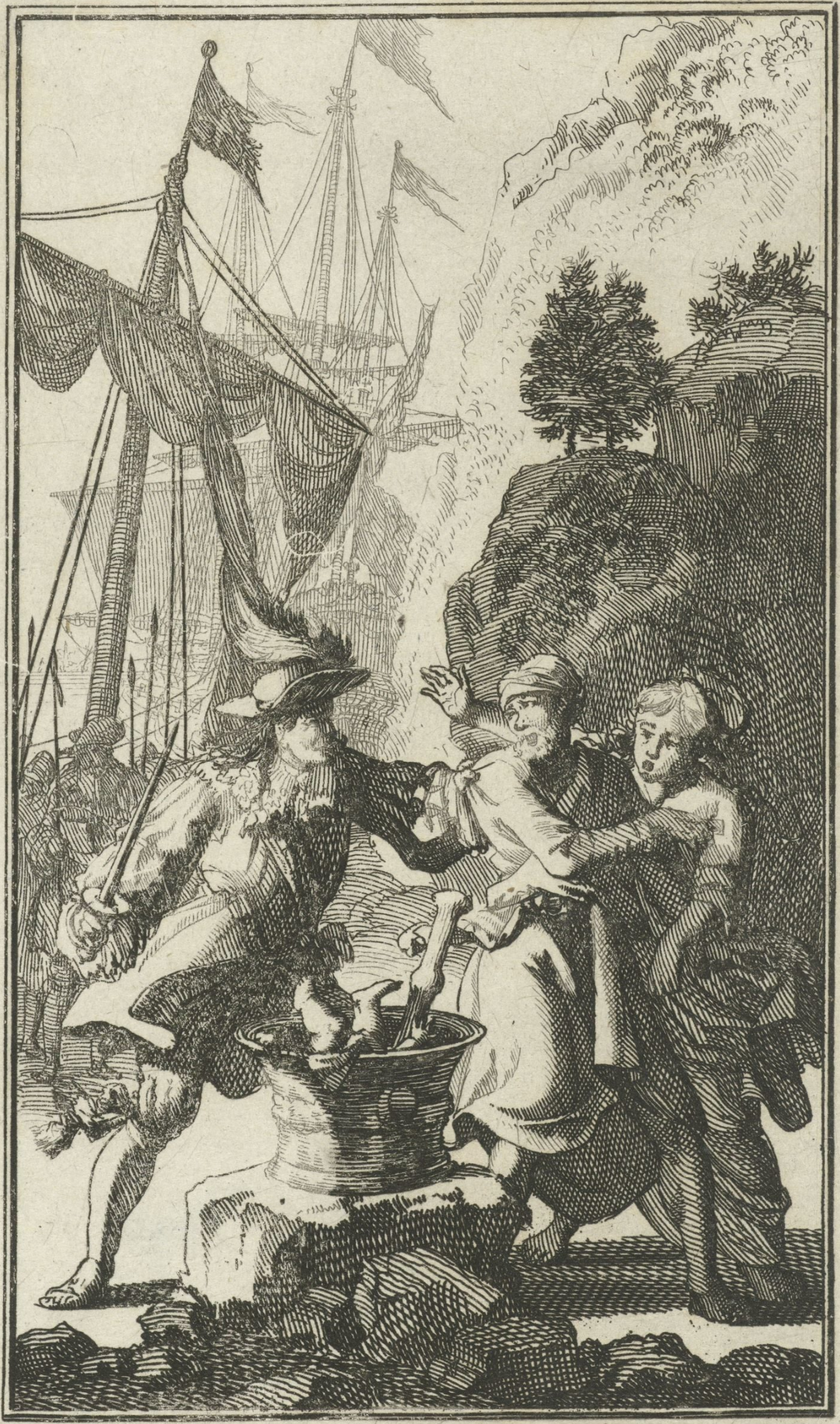
1689 engraving by Jan Luyken, taken from Jean de Thevenot's book Voyages Tant en Europe qu'en Asie et en Afrique, showing Portuguese admiral Rui Freire de Andrada ("Roüi-Fereyra-Andrade") landing at Qeshm and forcing a father and mother to kill their infant child by pounding it in a mortar. C. R. Boxer also noted Rui Freire's ruthless cruelty during the Persian Gulf campaigns.

Rui Freire de Andrade (sometimes Ruy Freyre de Andrada and similar variations, c. 1590s – December 1632) was a Portuguese soldier.

== Biography ==
=== Early life ===
Rui Freire de Andrade was born in Beja, Alentejo in the 1590s, son of João Freire de Andrade, who served as Chancellor of Portuguese India during the first decade of the 17th century.

=== Portuguese India ===
Rui Freire de Andrade's first voyage to India, in Dom Jeronimo Coutinho's fleet, took place in 1607. Once in India, he served several times in the armadas of North Malabar. In 1613, he was named captain of Daman, a fortress under siege by the Rajah of Sarceta. Rui Freire quickly distinguished himself in combat, forcing the Indian army to retreat. The following year, he was assigned to Chaul, which was also under attack, but the siege ended shortly after the captain's arrival. While in Chaul, he met viceroy Jerónimo de Azevedo's armada, on its way to fight the English in Surat. Rui Freire attempted to participate in the expedition, but the viceroy declined his assistance. Prior to returning to Portugal in 1617, Rui Freire commanded the Armada of the North.

=== Persian Gulf ===
In view of the growing difficulty of the Portuguese situation in the Strait of Hormuz, a result of the ambition of the Safavid shah Abbas I and the presence of the East India Company along the Persian coast, Philip III dispatched a large armada to Hormuz. Rui Freire de Andrade was given command of the expedition, whose objective was to drive the English from those waters and strengthen the Portuguese position in the Strait. The armada left Lisbon on 1 April 1619 and met with various difficulties, even in the Atlantic: bombardment by Castilian ships that were not properly identified and a battle with a Dutch ship near the Cape of Good Hope, finally reaching Hormuz on 20 June 1620. From there, Rui Freire sailed his armada to Jask, to attempt his first objective of hunting down English ships. The confrontations at Jask resulted in a tactical victory for the English, as the Portuguese were unable to prevent British commercial activities along the Persian coast, much less remove the English permanently from the Strait.

Having failed to accomplish the first objective, Rui Freire de Andrade began preparations for the second one: to strengthen the Portuguese position in the Strait by building a fort on Qeshm. Despite opposition from the Captain of Hormuz and the governor of Portuguese India, Fernão de Albuquerque, who feared the Persian reaction, Rui Freire carried out his plan, departing for Qeshm on 7 May 1621. After defeating the Persian forces that defended the island, he began construction of the fort. The Safavid response was not long in coming, as large numbers of Persian soldiers advanced on the island. As long as the Portuguese controlled the waters surrounding the fort, their position was secure. However, early in 1622, the arrival of English ships, which assisted the Safavid authorities, changed the situation. Under siege on land and in the sea, the Portuguese were forced to capitulate, and the Anglo-Persian coalition took Qeshm. The Portuguese soldiers were disarmed and transferred to Hormuz, but Rui Freire remained a prisoner of the English.

Even as the Anglo-Persian alliance placed Hormuz under siege, Rui Freire de Andrade managed to escape his captors near the Indian coast. There, he was able to gather some ships and depart to Muscat, where he immediately received news of the fall of Hormuz. With Constantino de Sá de Noronha, who had been sent from Goa with reinforcements, and after giving orders not to abandon the remaining Portuguese positions in the Strait, Rui Freire departed to Goa, where various investigations were in progress to evaluate his participation in the loss of Hormuz. However, after the arrival of the new viceroy, Francisco da Gama, Rui Freire was quickly acquitted and sent back to the Strait, to take the office of Governor-general. Arriving in the Strait in 1623, Rui Freire was quick to solidify the Portuguese position.

As a result of the loss of Hormuz, which the Portuguese attempted to retake unsuccessfully in the years that followed, Muscat had become the new Portuguese centre in the Strait. In 1623 and in 1624, Rui Freire undertook several campaigns along the Arabian coasts, taking several fortified strongholds: Sohar and Julfar, among others, and driving the Persians out of the Arabian side of the Strait. Still in 1624, he sent an expedition to Basra, under the command of Gonçalo da Silveira, with the purpose of aiding the Ottoman Pasha in the war against the Persians. Thus, he was able to reestablish commercial relations with that important Asian commercial emporium.

In 1625, a confrontation took place in the waters of the Strait, between the Portuguese tall-ship armada, captained by Nuno Álvares Botelho with the aid of Rui Freire de Andrade, and the Anglo-Dutch forces. Although the battle, which was played out in three parts, resulted in a stalemate, the northern Europeans realised that trips to the Strait would henceforth be much more difficult because of Portuguese opposition. In 1626, though numerous reinforcements were sent to the Strait due to fears that Muscat would be attacked, no confrontation occurred at all.

With the northern European threat in check and the situation of the Portuguese greatly enhanced, Rui Freire de Andrade restarted efforts to strengthen the Portuguese position in the Gulf from 1627 to 1629. Thus he established an alliance with the governing Caliph and attempted, unsuccessfully, to retake Bahrein, in addition to ordering several attacks on the Persian coast.

Abbas I died in 1629, and his successor, Safi I, needed to solidify his contested position, which led the Safavid authorities to propose a six-month truce with the Portuguese, to be repeated every year. In exchange, they offered the Governor-general the opportunity to establish a customs house in any port of his choice and to retain half the proceeds that would accrue from its operation. Rui Freire accepted the proposal, selecting the port of Kong as the location for the new customs house.

Meanwhile, at the end of 1629, a new viceroy, Dom Miguel de Noronha, 4th Count of Linhares, began governing Goa. Dom Miguel understood the range of possibilities opened to the Portuguese by the truce in the Strait, which freed Rui Freire de Andrade and the large military contingent stationed there for other endeavours. Therefore, Rui Freire was ordered back to Goa, to participate in an expedition for the purpose of military and financial oversight of the Northern Province fortresses, with the General Overseer of the Treasury, Miguel Pinheiro Ravasco. However, the overseer's death early in the journey gave Rui Freire an excuse to return to the Strait, without the viceroy's permission. The loss of Mombasa in 1631 provided Dom Miguel with a new reason to try to use the military resources of the Strait. There was even discussion in the Council of State that the main body of the expedition for the purpose of retaking that fortified stronghold should comprise troops from the Strait. However, the Governor-general's artful use of the northern European threat to Muscat as an argument resulted in the plan being abandoned, as the troops for that unsuccessful expedition were recruited mainly in India.

=== Death ===
Rui Freire de Andrade's health had been deteriorating since 1631, culminating in a bout of dysentery, from which he died in December 1632. He was buried in St Augustine's Convent in Muscat in September 1633.

== Selected works ==
Rui Freire de Andrade's papers and despatches were edited and published by Paulo Craesbeeck in Lisbon in 1647, as the Commentarios do grande capitam Ruy Freyre de Andrada, 'Commentaries of the great captain Ruy Freyre de Andrada'.

== Fictional depictions ==
- Magalhães, Miguel de Cours (2007). Ormuz: a saga heróica de Freyre de Andrade na Arábia, Pérsia e Índia [Hormuz: Freyre de Andrade's heroic saga in Arabia, Persia, and India.] (in Brazilian Portuguese). Planeta Ed. ISBN 978-972-731-207-8.
