= The Prince of Basra =

Basra Noble Title

The Prince of Basra is a title of nobility that was created in 1596 by Afrasiyab I after assuming the seat of ruling over Basra and establishing the House of Afrasiyab, which would rule the Principality of Basra from 1596 to 1668.

== Principality of Basra ==
Principality of Basra Arabic: إمارة البصرة
- Prince of Basra
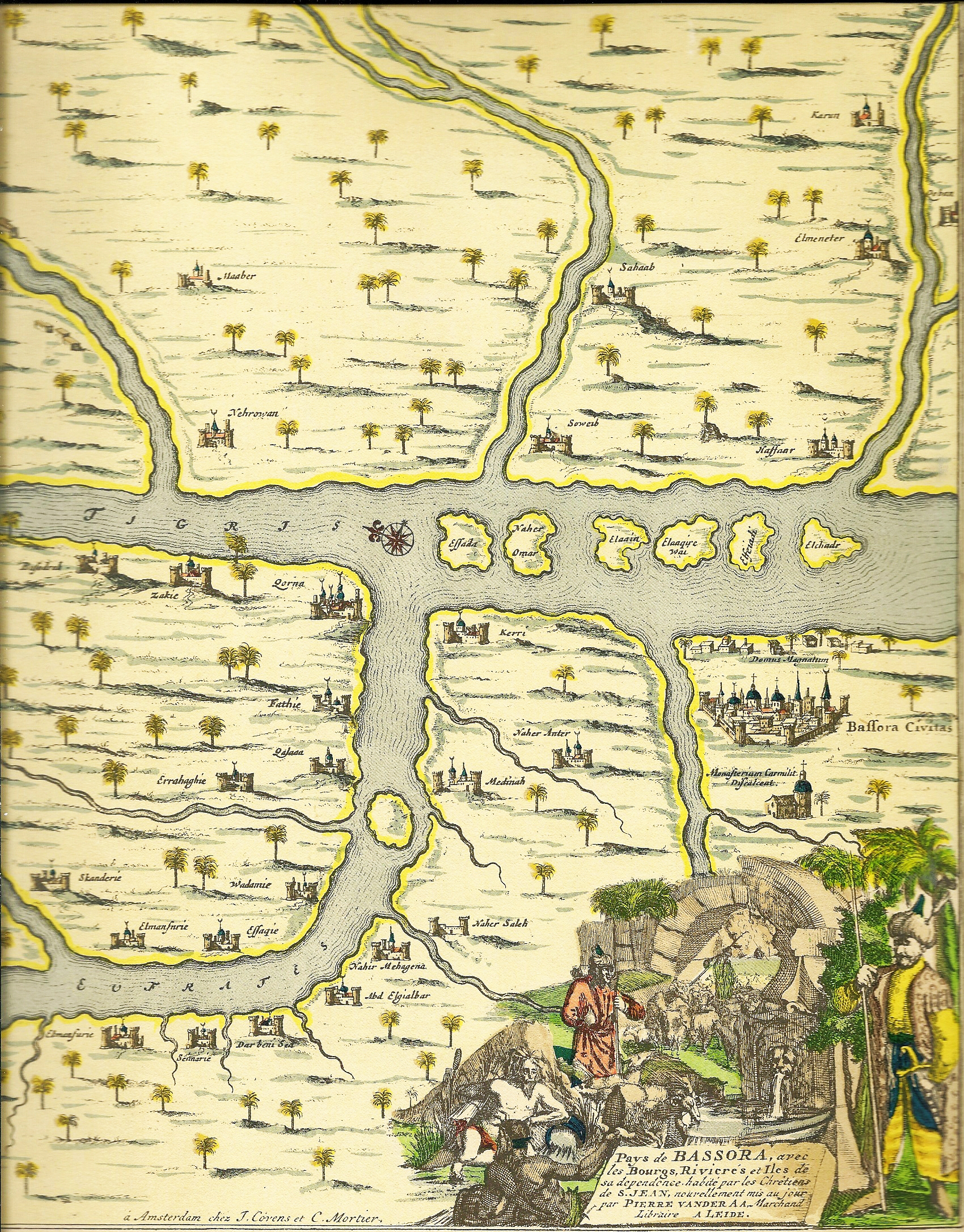
- A Map of the Basra Region,17th century
- Country: Ottoman Iraq
- Founded: 1596
- Founder: Afrasiyab I
- Final ruler: Hussein Pasha

In 1596, the Ottoman governor of Basra sold Basra to the merchant Afrasiab of Arab or Turkish origin, transforming Basra into a hereditary emirate that lasted until 1668.

Safavid invasions of Basra
- Part of Ottoman–Safavid War (1623–1639), Portuguese–Safavid wars
- Map of Safavid Iran occupy Mesopotamia, excluding Basra
Date	1624–1629
Location	Iraq, Basra, Persian Gulf
Result	Portugal-Basra victory List: first invasion of Basra (1624-1625); Siege of Basra (1624) siege failed; Siege of Basra (1625) siege failed; Battle of virtue (1625) Afrasiab Victory; Second invasion of Basra (1628-1629); Siege of Basra (1628-1629) siege failed

Belligerents
Safavid Iran; Masha'sha State (1624)	Afrasiyab of Basra; Kingdom of Portugal; Masha'sha State (1625)

Commanders and leaders
Shah Abbas I Quli Khan	Ali Afrasiyab

During this period, the Safavid Shah Abbas the Great (r. 1588–1629) made a number of attempts to capture Basra, a major rival for his own commercial port city of Bandar Abbas, and a base for the Portuguese traders in the region. The Safavid attempts in 1624, 1625, and 1628–1629 during the War of 1623–1639 proved unsuccessful, through a combination of Portuguese interference, pressing concerns on other fronts and, finally, Abbas' death.

in 1667, when Husayn Pasha of the Afrasiyab dynasty refused to acknowledge the suzerainty of the Sultan and the Ottomans sent a punitive expedition against him, Husayn Pasha evacuated the entire population to Safavid territory while offering the city to the Safavids. Shah Suleiman I (r. 1666–1694), however, dismissed Husayn Pasha's pleas as he did not want to antagonize the Ottomans, and in 1668, the Ottoman governor of Baghdad established direct control over Basra.

== See also ==
- Basra
