= Mehdi Qoli Khan Shamlu =

Turkoman military officer from the Shamlu tribe

- مهدی قلی خان شاملو
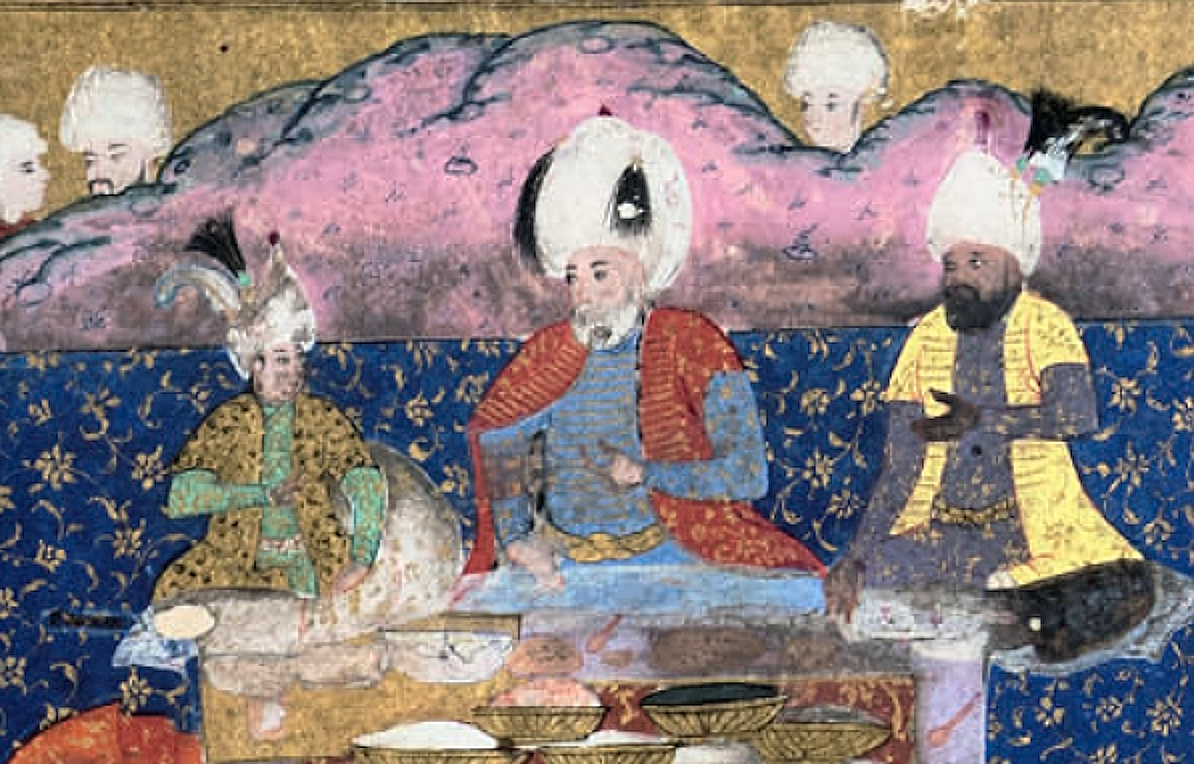
- Ottoman–Safavid banquet scene in Erzurum, following the Treaty of Constantinople (1590), with child-hostage Safavid Prince Haydar Mirza (left), Ottoman commander Ferhad Pasha (center) and Safavid ambassador Mahdiquli Khan (right).

Safavid ambassador to Ottoman Empire
- In office 1590
- Monarch: Abbas the Great

Governor of Bia-Pish
- In office 1592–1593
- Monarch: Abbas the Great
- Preceded by: Khan Ahmad Khan (Kia'i rule)

Personal details
- Tribe: Shamlu

Mehdi Qoli Khan Shamlu, also Mahdiquli Khan (Persian: مهدی قلی خان شاملو) was a Turkoman military officer from the Shamlu tribe.

== Career ==
Following the Treaty of Constantinople (1590) putting an end to the Ottoman–Safavid War (1578–1590), he was a Safavid ambassador to the Ottoman Empire, who escorted the child-hostage and Safavid Prince Haydar Mirza to Istanbul. An illustrated Ottoman manuscript, the Book of Treasury of the Conquest of Ganja, records the details of a reception in Erzurum for the Safavid party, in which Mehdi Qoli Khan appears as a guest of honor at the head of the table, to the left of Ottoman Commander Ferhad Pasha, and near the young Prince Haydar Mirza.

He briefly served as the Safavid governor of Bia-pish (eastern Gilan) from 1592 to 1593.

After the fall of the Kia'i dynasty, shah Abbas I appointed Mehdi Qoli Khan as the governor of Bia-pish, while Ali Beg Sultan was appointed as the governor of Bia-pas (western Gilan). One year later, however, Mehdi Qoli Khan was dismissed by the shah due to his bad management of the province. He is thereafter no longer mentioned.

== Sources ==
- Casale, Sinem Arcak (2023). Gifts in the Age of Empire. Ottoman-Safavid Cultural Exchange, 1500–1639. The University of Chicago Press. ISBN 978-0226820422.
- Kasheff, Manouchehr (2001). "GĪLĀN v. History under the Safavids". Encyclopaedia Iranica, Vol. X, Fasc. 6. pp. 635–642.
- Mitchell, Colin P. (2009). The Practice of Politics in Safavid Iran: Power, Religion and Rhetoric. I.B.Tauris. pp. 1–304. ISBN 978-0857715883.

Preceded by Khan Ahmad Khan (Kia'i rule)	Governor of Bia-pish; 1592 – 1593	Unknown
