= Ganja Fortress =

- Azerbaijani: Gəncə qalası Persian: قلعه گنجه
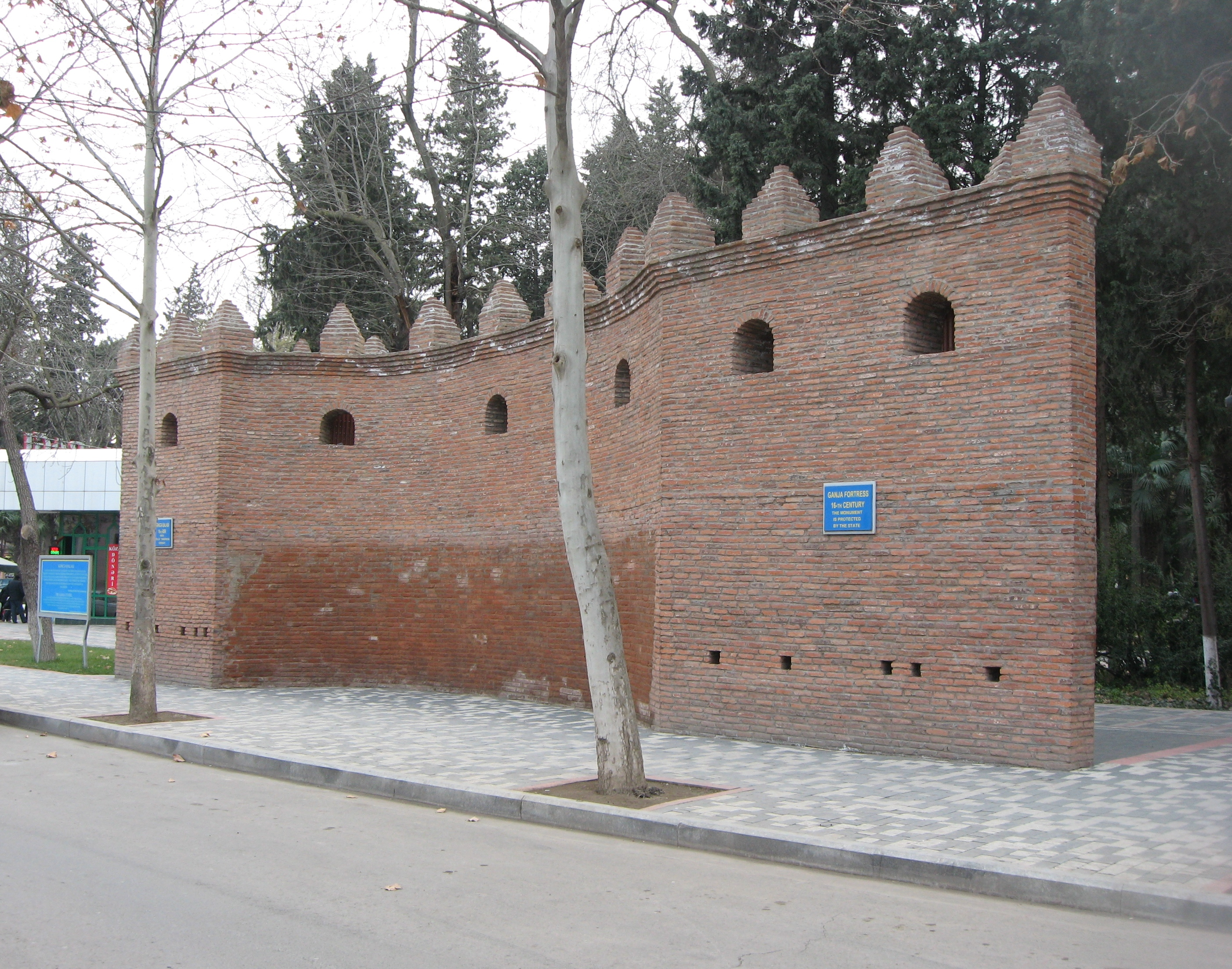
- The preserved part of the fortress, built in the XVI century in "New Ganja"
- Interactive map of the Ganja Fortress area

General information
- Type: Fortress
- Architectural style: Architectural school of Arran
- Location: Gala Street, Ganja, Azerbaijan
- Coordinates: 40°40′36″N 46°21′19″E
- Completed: 3 September 1588
- Client: Murad III; Farhad Pasha

Technical details
- Material: Brick

Ganja Fortress (Azerbaijani: Gəncə qalası, Persian: قلعه گنجه) is a fortress in Ganja, Azerbaijan. The remains of walls of the fortress can be seen in the territory of the oldest park of the city, Khan's Garden and in the entrance to the city, along the Ganja River.

== History ==
Farhad Pasha, who headed the Turkish army in the Caucasus, went to Ganja, controlled by the Safavids, by the order of Sultan Murad III. Ganja was captured on 1 September 1588. After taking Ganja, on 3 September 1588, Pasha ordered the construction of the castle 7–8 kilometers from the city. About forty days later the castle was built 2.3 km (1.4 mi) in length and 6 m (20 ft) in height with 1.8 m (5 ft 11 in) thick walls. It was built in a flat area and on the left bank of the Ganja River. Ganja was divided into four parts by the fortress in the 16th century: the outer city, Shahristan, Ichgala and Naringala.

In 1868, after Ganja became the regional center of the Caucasus, a new master plan for the city was prepared by architect Ignati Kshishtalovic. After the master plan was approved in 1873 by Alexander II, the walls of the fortress were demolished and European-styled neighborhoods were built. At present, a very small part of the Ganja fortress – Shiralibey tower – remains. In 2007, the fortress wall was renovated.

== Architectural features ==
While building the castle, some neighborhoods of Ganja were kept outside the walls of the fortress. It was built in an uneven polygonal shape. In the construction of the fortress, clay-mud, cobblestones and baked red bricks – traditional Ganja architecture – were used. For that reason its south-west, north-west, and north-east walls were strong. The total length and height were 13.7 km (8.5 mi) and 12 m (39 ft) respectively. A total of 30 defensive towers were built across the wall every 200 to 500 metres (660 to 1,640 feet).

At certain height of the fortress walls, embrasures and watchtowers were constructed. They were important to use to attack the enemy. From those places, local fighters used to spill boiling oil and lubricant on attacking enemies.

== Gallery ==
Remains of the internal walls of the fortress

== See also ==
- Battle of Ganja (1804)
- Architecture of Azerbaijan
