= Ferhat Pasha =

Ferhat Pasha may refer to:

- Serdar Ferhad Pasha (or Ferhat Pasha), Ottoman, twice grand vizier
  - Treaty of Constantinople (1590), or Treaty of Ferhad Pasha
- Ferhad Pasha Sokolović, Ottoman general and statesman
  - Ferhat Pasha Mosque (Banja Luka), in Banja Luka, Bosnia and Herzegovina
