= Shah Mansur Lahiji =

Shah Mansur Lahiji (Persian: شاه منصور لاهیجی) was an Iranian military commander of the Kia'i dynasty. His surname "Lahiji" implies that he was a native of Lahijan, and thus probably of Gilaki origin. He is first mentioned during the reign of Khan Ahmad Khan (r. 1538-1592), where he served as the military commander of Lahijan and also as the governor of Kuchesfahan, which was claimed by its original ruler Amira Sasan. On June 1567, Shah Mansur Lahiji inflicted a heavy defeat on Amira Sasan near Siah-rudbar, making him and his men rout. Shah Mansur Lahiji thereafter disappears from mention.

== Sources ==
- Kasheff, Manouchehr (2001). "GĪLĀN v. History under the Safavids". Encyclopaedia Iranica, Vol. X, Fasc. 6. pp. 635–642.
