= Yulqoli Beg Zu'l-Qadr =

Safavid military officer (died 1567)

Yulqoli Beg Zu'l-Qadr (Persian: یولقلی بیگ ذوالقدر) was a Turkoman military officer from the Zu'l-Qadr family, and was one of the trusted men of the Safavid shah Tahmasp I (r. 1524–1576). In the mid-1560s, Yulqoli Beg Zu'l-Qadr, together with a group of other Safavid officers, were sent on a diplomatic mission to Rasht, in order to negotiate peace with the Kia'i ruler of Bia-pish (eastern Gilan), Khan Ahmad Khan. In June 1567, however, Khan Ahmad Khan had Yulqoli killed and his head sent to him.

== Sources ==
- Kasheff, Manouchehr (2001). "GĪLĀN v. History under the Safavids". Encyclopaedia Iranica, Vol. X, Fasc. 6. pp. 635–642.
