= Yakhan Begum =

Daughter of Khan Ahmad Khan (died 1602)

Yakhan Begum (Persian: یاکهان بیگم) (also Gilani Yakhan Begum) (b. c. 1586/1587 CE) was a Karkiya princess, who was the daughter of the last Karkiya ruler Khan Ahmad Khan (r. 1538–1592), and the Safavid princess Maryam Begum.

In 1591, the Safavid prince Mohammad Baqer Mirza was engaged to Yakhan Begum, but in the end a marriage did not take place due to the opposition of her father. Mohammad Baqer's father Shah Abbas I (r. 1588–1629) then decided to marry Yakhan Begum in 1602, but she died in the same year.

== Sources ==
- Newman, Andrew J. (2008). Safavid Iran: Rebirth of a Persian Empire. I.B.Tauris. pp. 1–281. ISBN 9780857716613.
- Kasheff, Manouchehr (2001). "GĪLĀN v. History under the Safavids". Encyclopaedia Iranica, Vol. X, Fasc. 6. pp. 635–642.
