= Maryam Begum =

16th century Safavid princess, daughter of Shah Tahmasp I

Maryam Begum (Persian: مریم بیگم) was a Safavid princess, who was a daughter of shah Tahmasp I (r. 1524–1576) and in 1577 married the Kia'i ruler Khan Ahmad Khan—they later had an unnamed son and daughter named Yakhan Begum. Maryam Begum died in 1608/9.

== Sources ==
- Nashat, Guity; Beck, Lois (2003). Women in Iran from the Rise of Islam to 1800. University of Illinois Press. pp. 1–253. ISBN 978-0-252-07121-8.
- Newman, Andrew J. (2008). Safavid Iran: Rebirth of a Persian Empire. I.B.Tauris. pp. 1–281. ISBN 9780857716613.
- Babaie, Sussan (2004). Slaves of the Shah: New Elites of Safavid Iran. I.B.Tauris. pp. 1–218. ISBN 9781860647215.
- Matthee, Rudi (1999). The Politics of Trade in Safavid Iran: Silk for Silver, 1600-1730. Cambridge University Press. pp. 1–290. ISBN 0521641314.
