= Chahar Padshahan =

Mausolemu and mosque in Lahijan, Gilan, Iran

- مسجد چهار پادشاهان
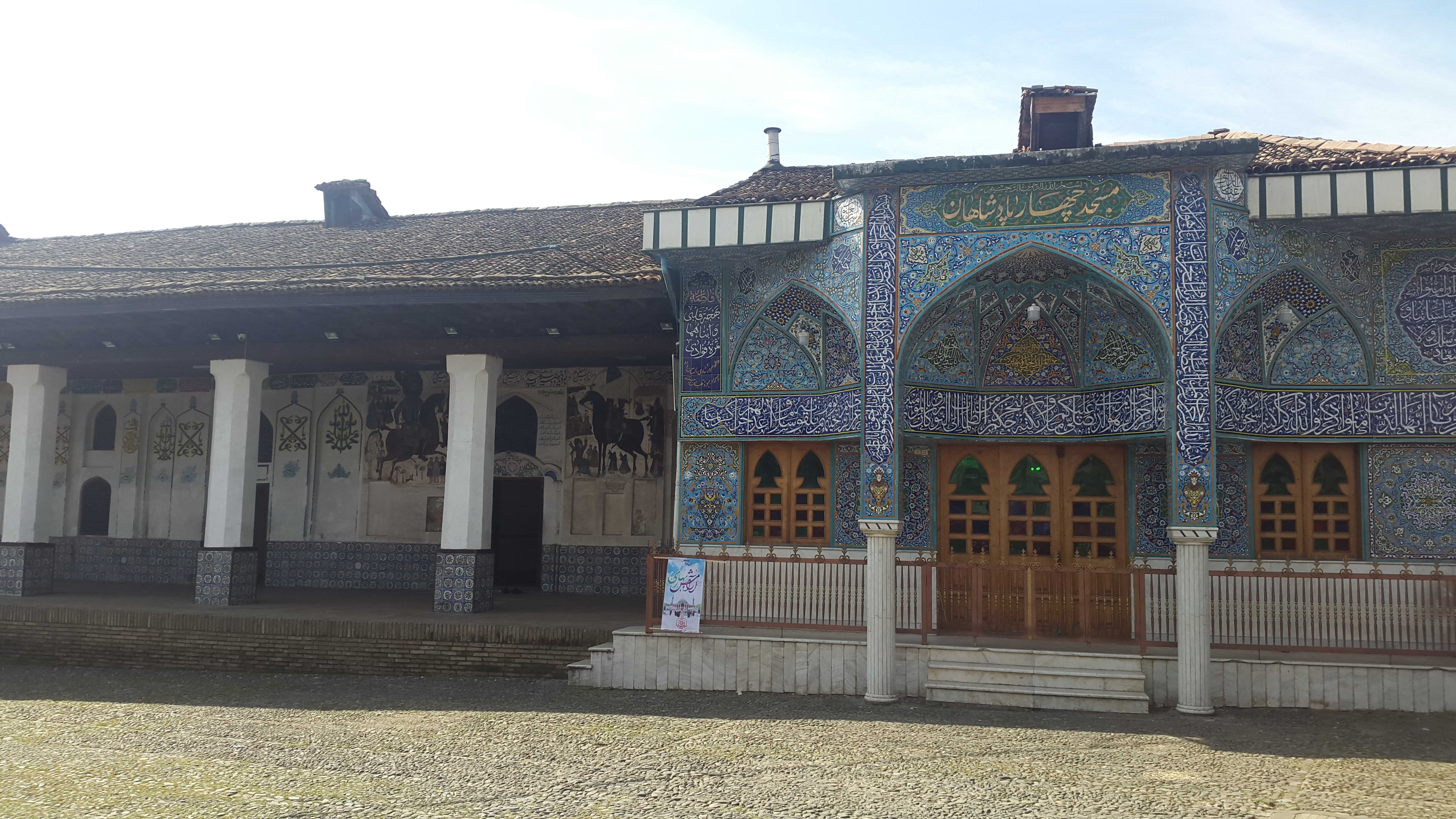
- Detail on the façade, in 2018

- Location of the mausoleum and mosque in Iran

Religion
- Affiliation: Shia (Twelver)
- Sect: Zaydi Shi'a
- Ecclesiastical or organisational status: Mausoleum and mosque
- Status: Active

Location
- Location: Lahijan, Gilan
- Country: Iran
- Coordinates: 37°12′13″N 49°59′55″E

Architecture
- Type: Mosque architecture
- Style: Safavid
- Completed: 13th-century (original structure); Safavid (current structure)
- Materials: Clay brick

Iran National Heritage List
- Official name: Mausoleum of Chahar Padshahan
- Type: Mausoleum
- Designated: 1938
- Reference no.: 322
- Conservation organization: Cultural Heritage, Handicrafts and Tourism Organization of Iran

The Chahar Padshahan (Persian: مسجد چهار پادشاهان, lit. 'Four Kings') is an historic Twelver Shia mausoleum and mosque, located in Lahijan, in the province of Gilan, Iran. Four rulers of the Karkiya dynasty are buried in the complex. Despite being intended as a mausoleum, the Chahar Padshahan is also used as a mosque.

The mausoleum and mosque complex was added to the Iran National Heritage List on 12 November 1938, administered by the Cultural Heritage, Handicrafts and Tourism Organization of Iran.

== History ==
The building was originally a mausoleum for the ancestor of the Karkiya dynasty, Seyyed Karkiya, who died in 1250, and a tomb was established for him immediately after he died. After the demise of Karkiyid ruler Ali-Kiya, he was buried in the mausoleum too, next to Seyyed Karkiya. Then his son, Reza-Kiya, was buried there next to him, following him, his brother Razi-Kiya was also buried there, next to him. The Karkiyid ruler Hady-Kiya helped to expand and renovate the mausoleum where he buried his brothers in. During the Safavid era (before Shah Abbas' rule) the mausoleum was constructed and expanded. At some point during the Qajar era, the mausoleum was renovated and tiled.

== Architecture ==
The main building of Chahar Padshahan is rectangular, with four rooms, and as well as a porch facing the north direction. The building has two main entrances, and the main building, the mausoleum itself, is located on the south side of the yard. The entrance doors are made of polished wood. This building is tiled extensively, with the tilework dating from the Qajar era.

The Karkiyid rulers are buried in a central room. In this room, their graves are enclosed by a wooden zarih. The larger room, next to the tomb room, is used as a prayer hall for a mosque.

== Gallery ==
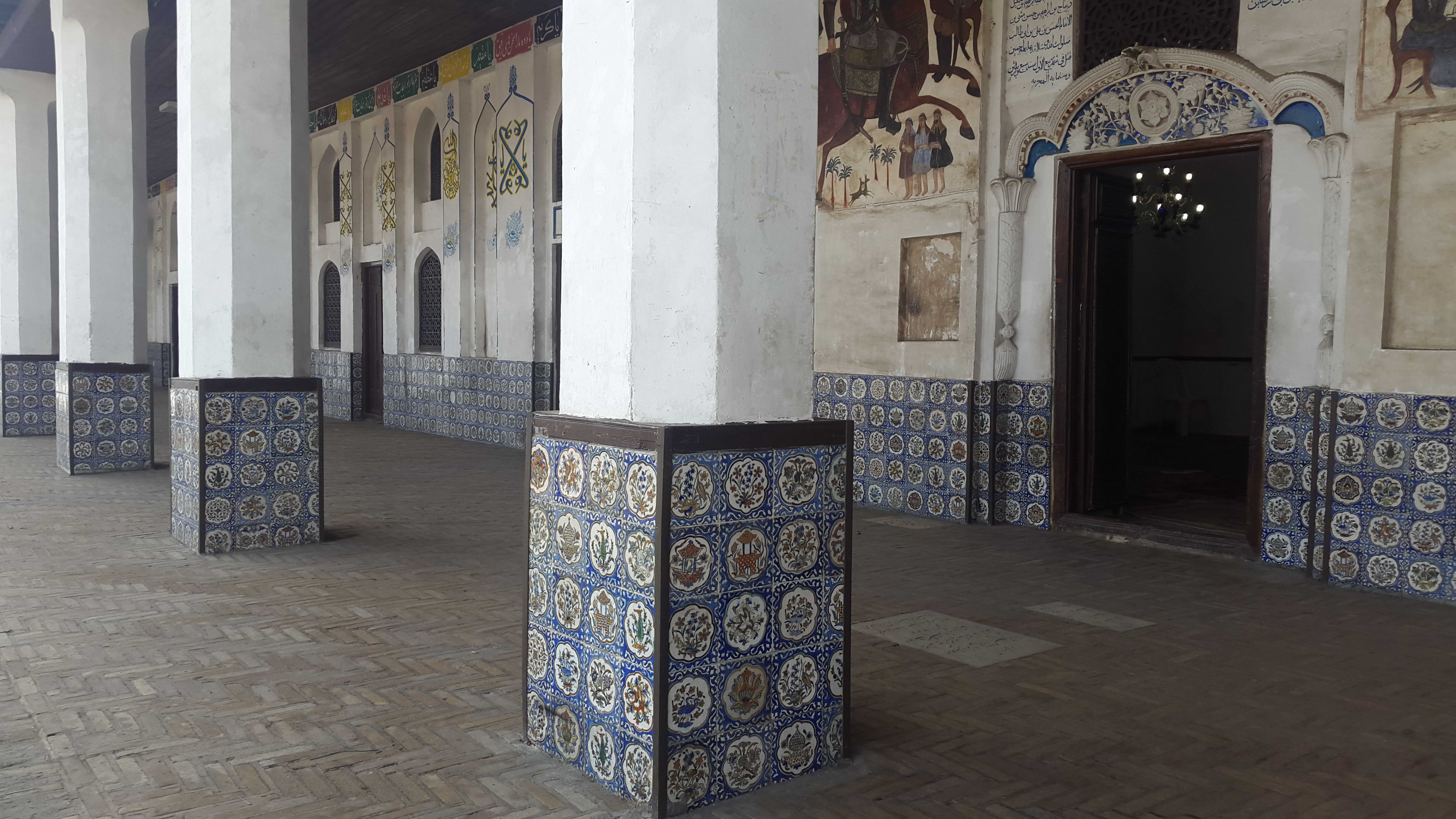
One of the mosque's corridors

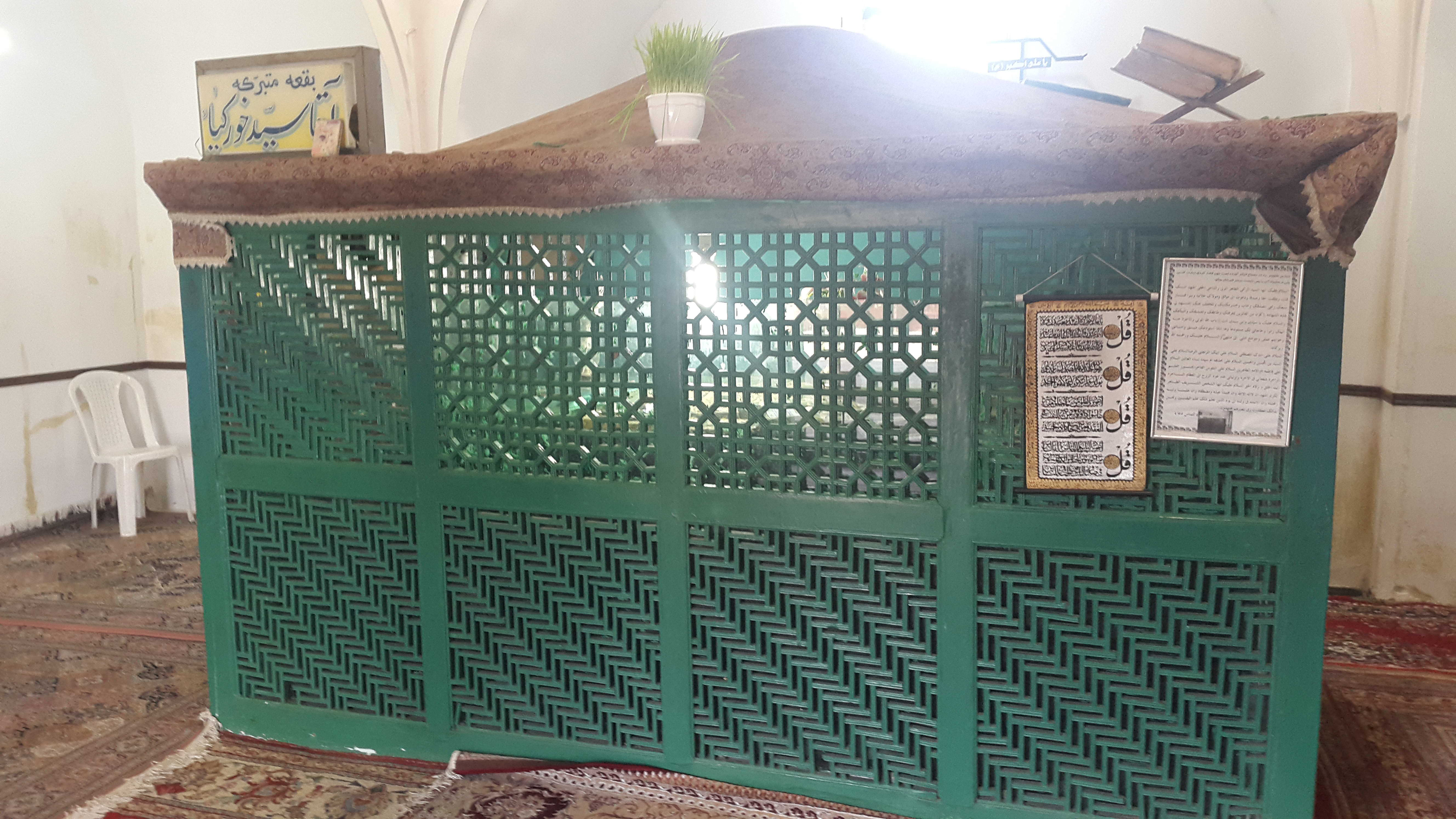
Inside the mausoleum of the Karkiyid rulers

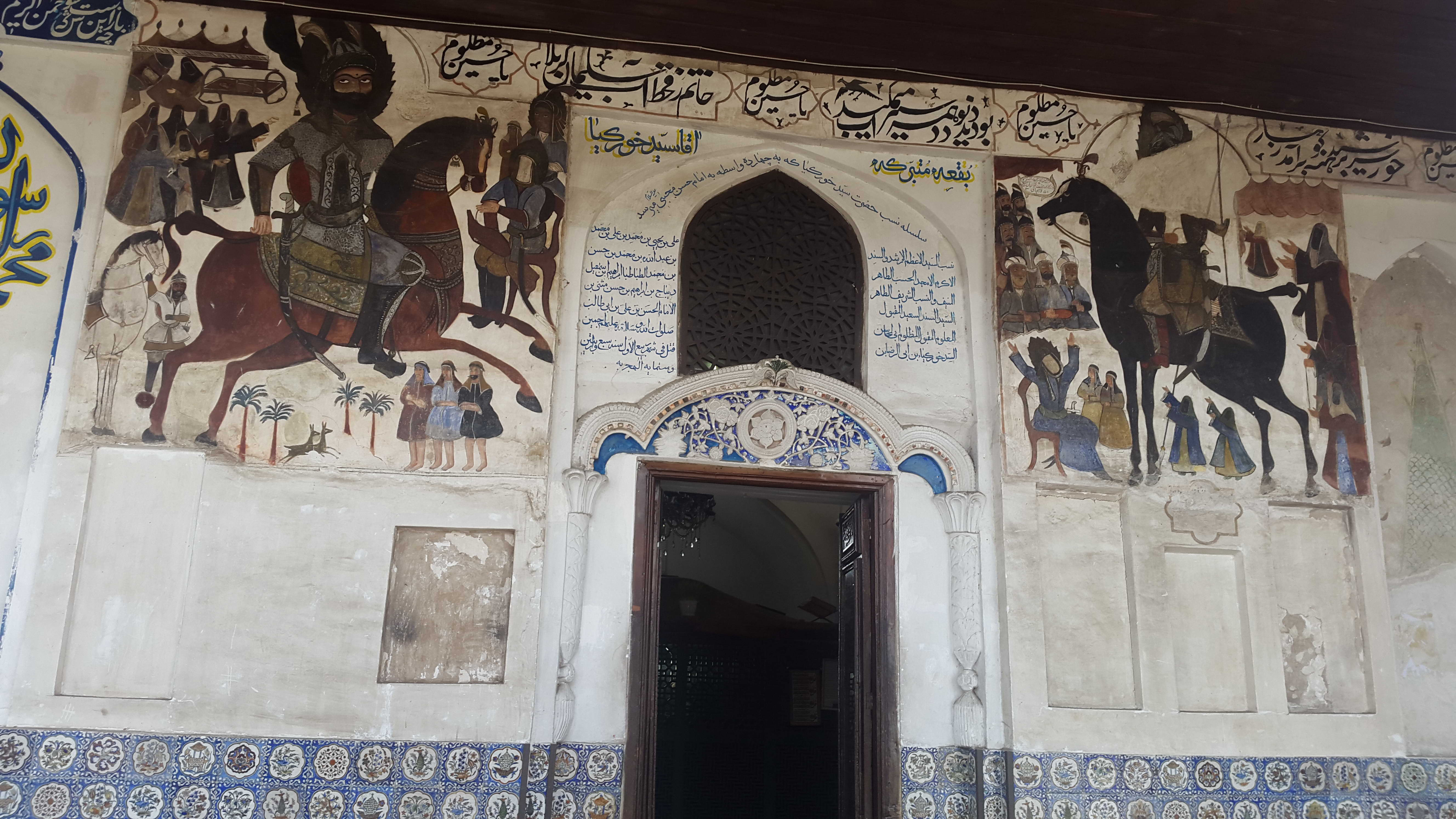
Paintings of the Karkiyid rulers on the upper part of mausoleum's entrance

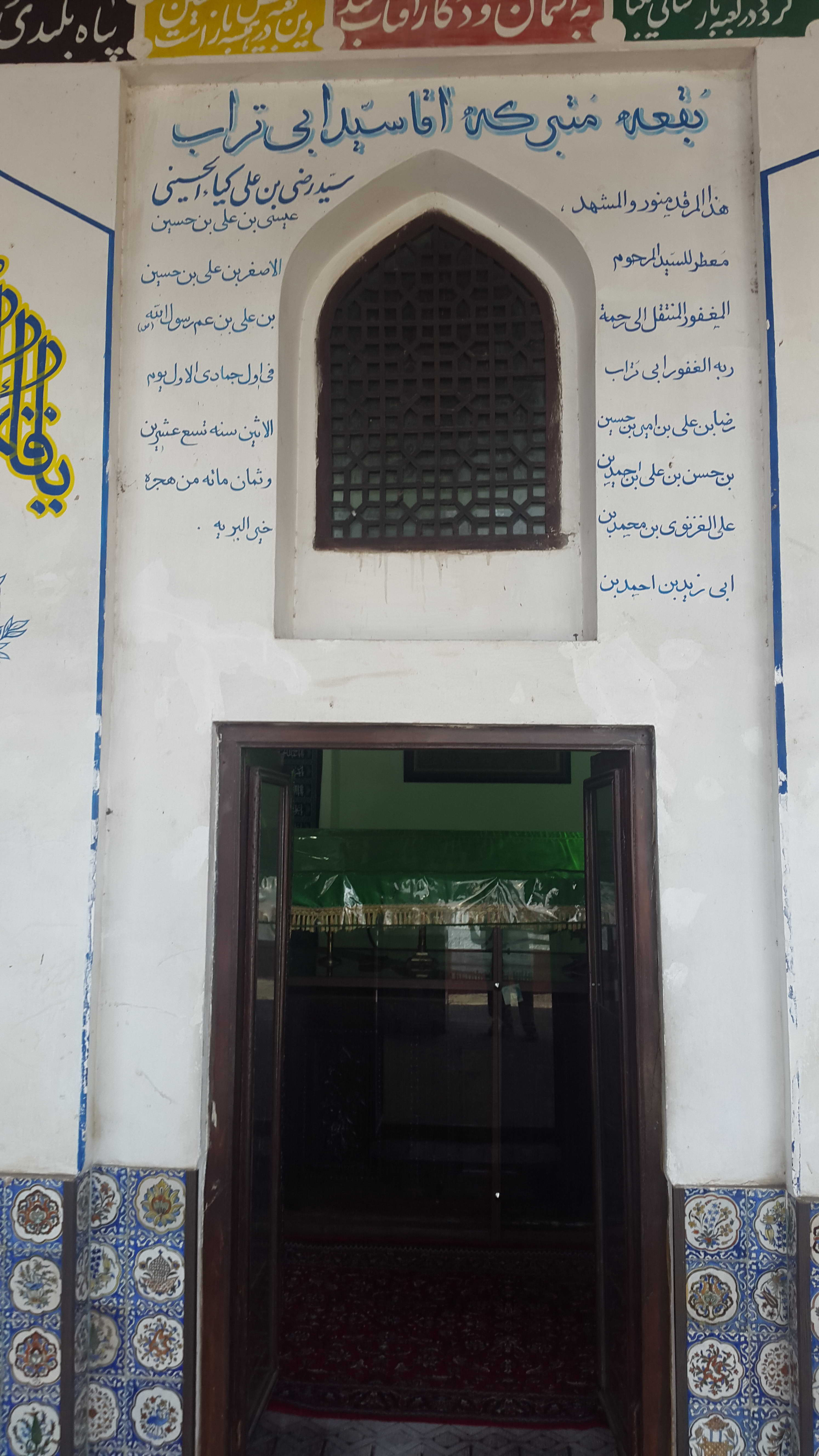
A door leading to the mausoleum's tomb room

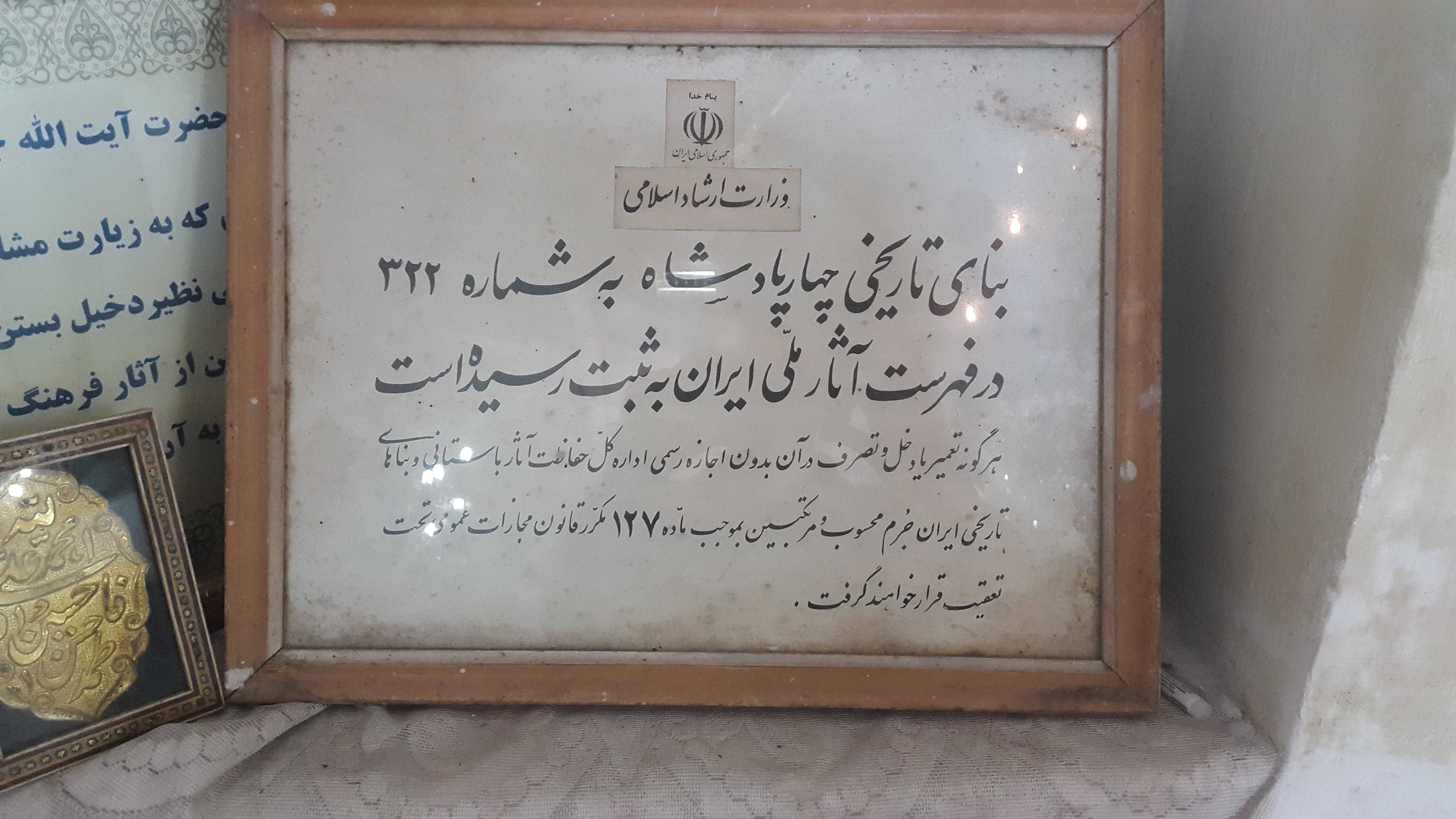
A copyright infringement notice, which is framed honourably

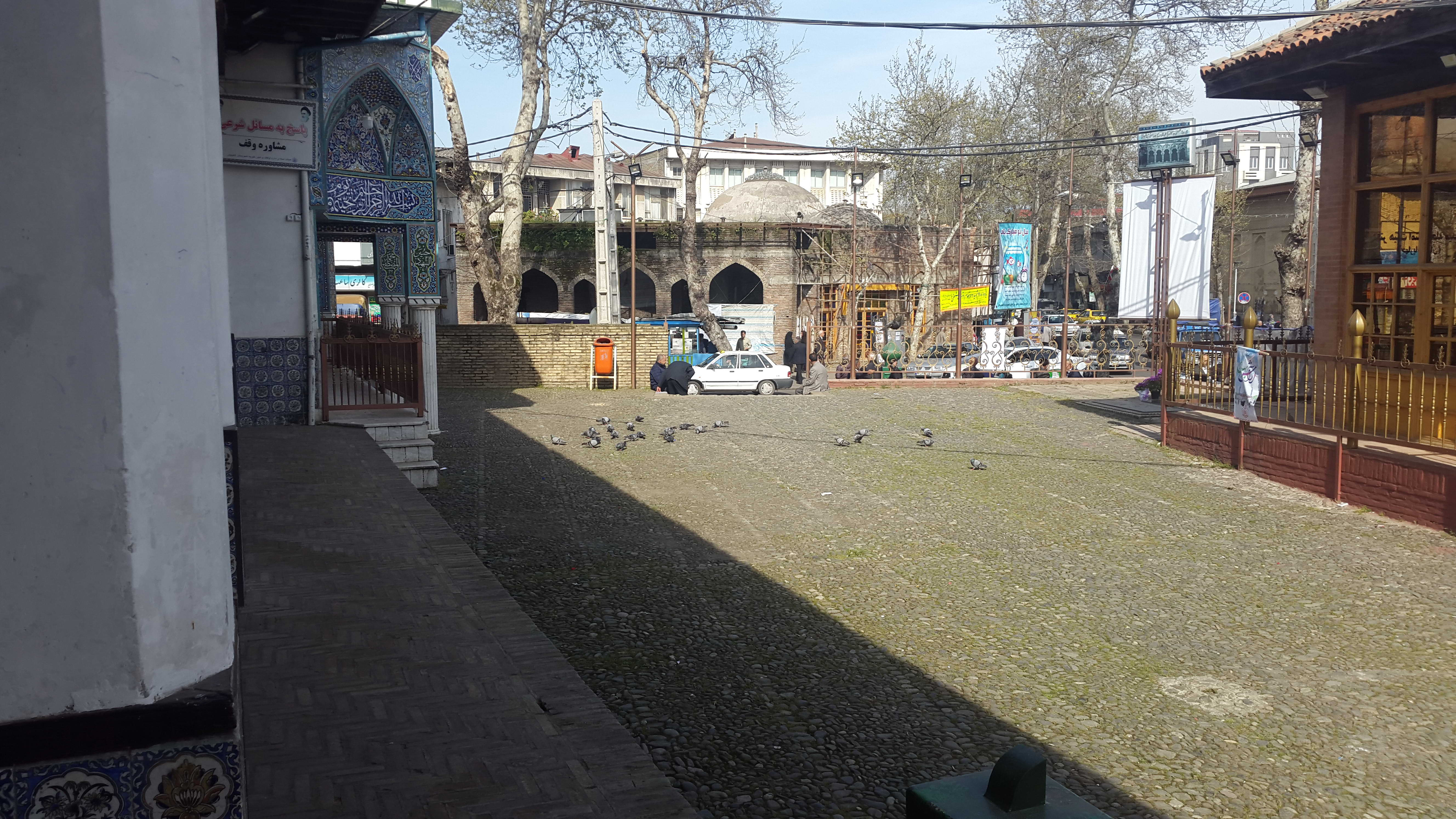
A view from the main building's porch, showing the Jameh Mosque of Lahijan across the street

== See also ==
- Shia Islam in Iran
- List of mosques in Iran
- List of mausoleums in Iran
