= Soltan-Ali Mirza =

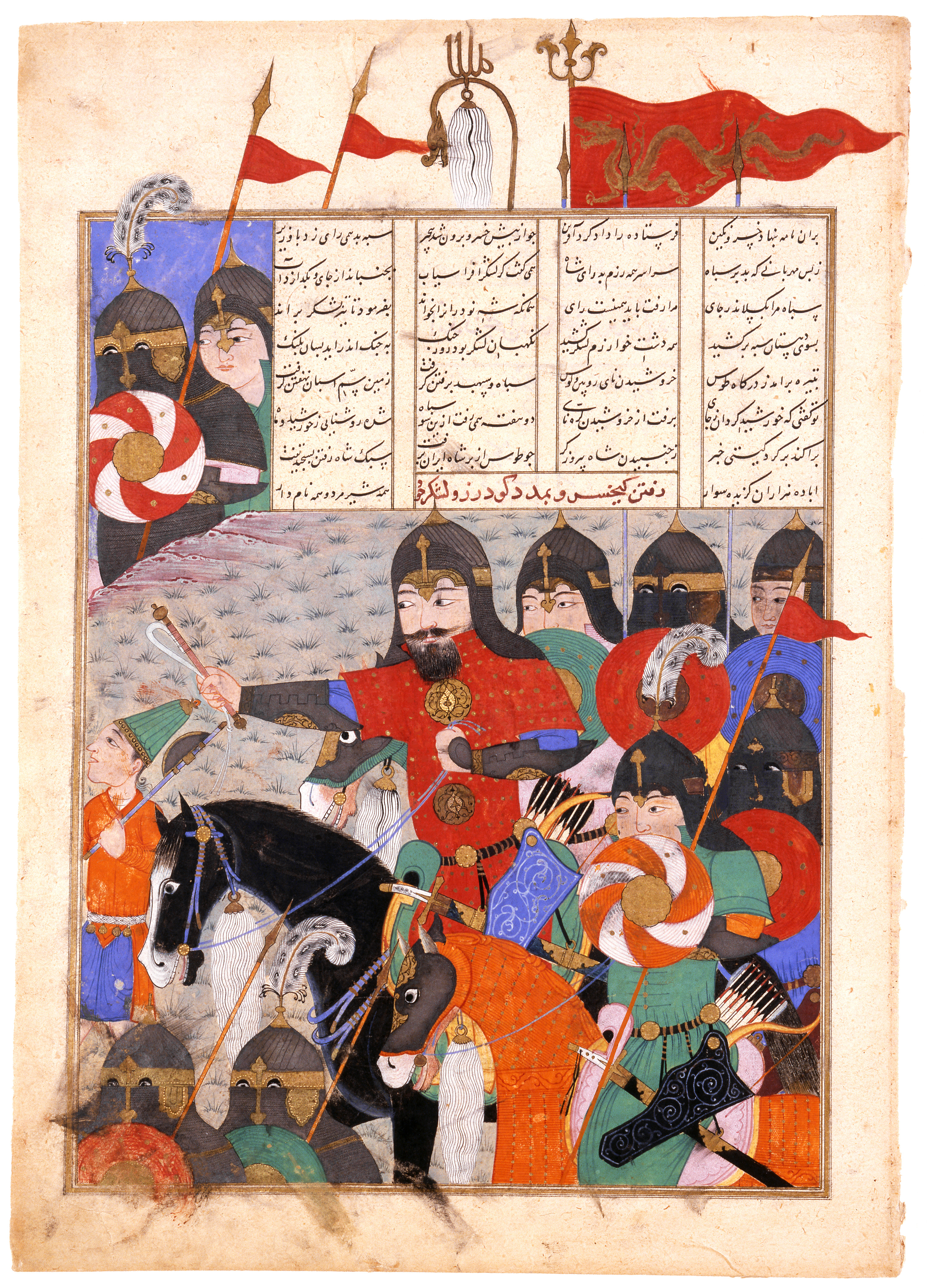
- "Kay Khosrow Marches to Godarz's Rescue". Miniature from the "Big Head Shahnama", produced for Soltan-Ali Mirza in 1493/94

Ruler of the Kar-Kiya dynasty
- Reign: 1478–1504/05
- Predecessor: Soltan-Mohammad Mirza
- Successor: Soltan-Hasan
- Died: 1506
- Religion: Zaydi Shia Islam

Soltan-Ali Mirza (Persian: سلطانعلی میرزا) was the ruler of the Kar-Kiya dynasty from 1478 to 1504/05. Under him, the dynasty reached its apex of power, to such a degree that he fought against the Aq Qoyunlu over the rulership of Qazvin.

Due to several fruitless and taxing expeditions in Bia-pas (western Gilan), he was overthrown by his brother Soltan-Hasan in 1504/5. In 1506, during Soltan-Ali Mirza's attempt to regain the throne, but he and Soltan-Hasan were killed. The throne was shortly taken by Soltan-Hasan's son Soltan-Ahmad, who had previously resided at the court of the Safavid ruler Ismail I.

The cultural prosperity during Soltan-Ali Mirza's ruled is demonstrated by the production of the "Big Head Shahnama" in 1493/94.

== Sources ==
- Goto, Yukako (2017). "Kār Kiā". Encyclopaedia Iranica.
- Goto, Yukako (2020). "Kār Kiyā dynasty". In Fleet, Kate; Krämer, Gudrun; Matringe, Denis; Nawas, John; Rowson, Everett (eds.). Encyclopaedia of Islam (3rd ed.). Brill Online. ISSN 1873-9830.
- Sajjadi, Sadeq; Melvin-Koushki, Matthew (2008). "The Amīr Kiyāʾids of Gīlān". In Madelung, Wilferd; Daftary, Farhad (eds.). Encyclopaedia Islamica Online. Brill Online. doi:10.1163/1875-9831_isla_COM_0273. ISSN 1875-9831.

Soltan-Ali Mirza Died: 1506
Preceded by Soltan-Mohammad Mirza	Ruler of the Kar-Kiya dynasty 1478–1504/05	Succeeded by Soltan-Hasan
