= Khan Ahmad Khan =

King of the Karkiya dynasty (1537-1596) (r. 1538-1592)

King of the Karkiya dynasty
- Reign: 1538–1592
- Predecessor: Soltan-Hasan Kiya
- Successor: Safavid conquest
- Born: 1537; Lahijan, Kar-Kiya, Safavid Iran
- Died: 1596 (aged 58–59); Constantinople, Ottoman Empire
- Burial: Najaf, Iraq
- Spouse: Maryam Begum
- Issue: Yakhan Begum
- Father: Soltan-Hasan Kiya
- Religion: Twelver Shia Islam

Khan Ahmad Khan (Gilaki/Persian: خان احمد خان), was the last king of the Karkiya dynasty in Gilan, ruling from 1538 to 1592. In 1591, the Safavid shah Shah Abbas (r. 1588–1629) asked Khan Ahmad Khan's daughter Yakhan Begum to marry his son Mohammad Baqer Mirza, since Khan Ahmad Khan had no male successor. Khan Ahmad Khan disagreed due to the age of his daughter. This and some other economic factors caused a Safavid raid in 1591 and Khan Ahmad Khan escaped to Ottoman territories, and spent the rest of his life in Constantinople and Baghdad in Ottoman Iraq, spending fruitless attempts to return to power. He died in 1596 and was buried in Najaf, one of the holiest cities of Shia Islam.

== Biography ==
=== First reign ===
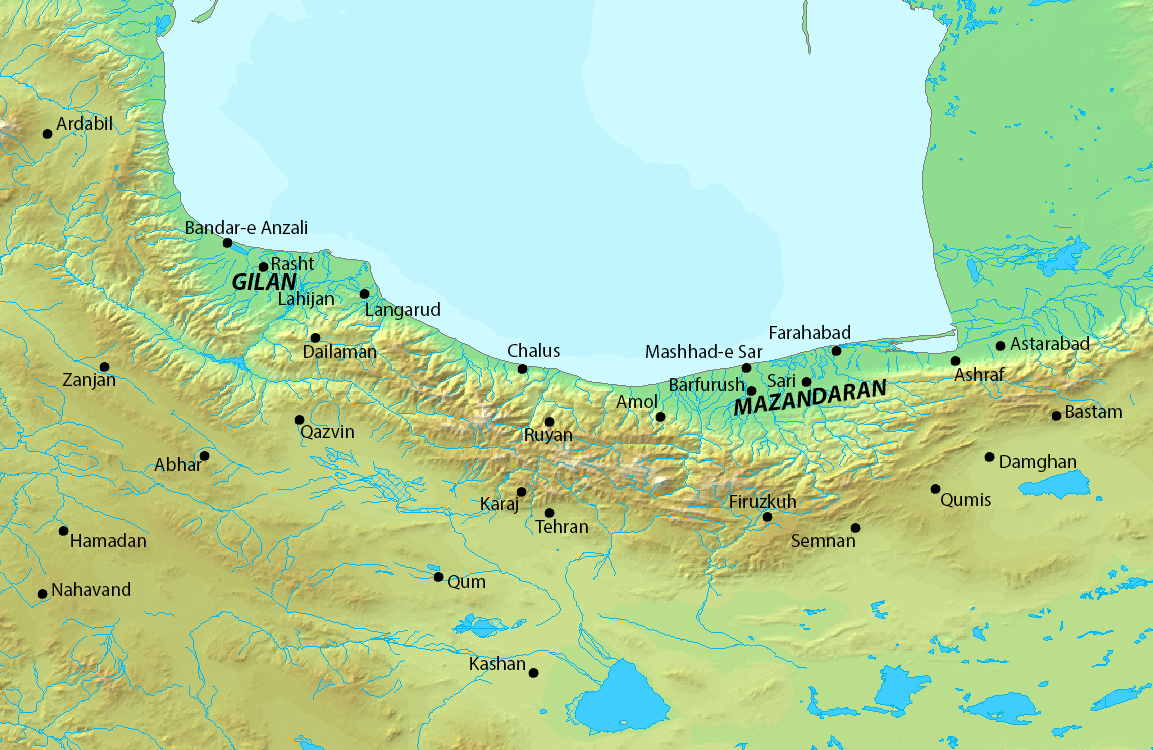
Map of northern Iran

Khan Ahmad Khan's father, Soltan-Hasan Kiya, died in 1538 because of plague. Khan Ahmad Khan, who was only an infant at the time of his father's death, was thereafter crowned as the new king of the Karkiya dynasty of Bia-pish (eastern Gilan). He was shortly given Bia-pas (western Gilan), thus becoming the ruler of whole Gilan. However, the brutality of the Karkiya army in Bia-pas made its inhabitants invite a certain Amira Shahrok to become the ruler of Bia-pas. This Amira Shahrok was a distant relative of Mozaffar Soltan, who was the former ruler of Bia-pas, but had been burned alive by the Safavids two years earlier.

Amira Shahrok first arrived to Bia-pas a few years later (January 1544), where he began minting coins in the name of the Safavid shah Tahmasp I (r. 1524–1576). Seven years later, Khan Ahmad Khan managed to persuade Tahmasp I to have Amira Shahrok executed, who was unable to meet the demands of the Qizilbash chieftains. A certain Soltan Mahmud, who was a son of Mozaffar Soltan, was then appointed as the new ruler of Bia-pas. However, Khan Ahmad Khan once again complained to the court, stating that Soltan Mahmud was not unable to rule. Soltan Mahmud was shortly exiled to Shiraz, where he was shortly poisoned under the orders of Khan Ahmad Khan. He thus became the sole ruler of Gilan once again.

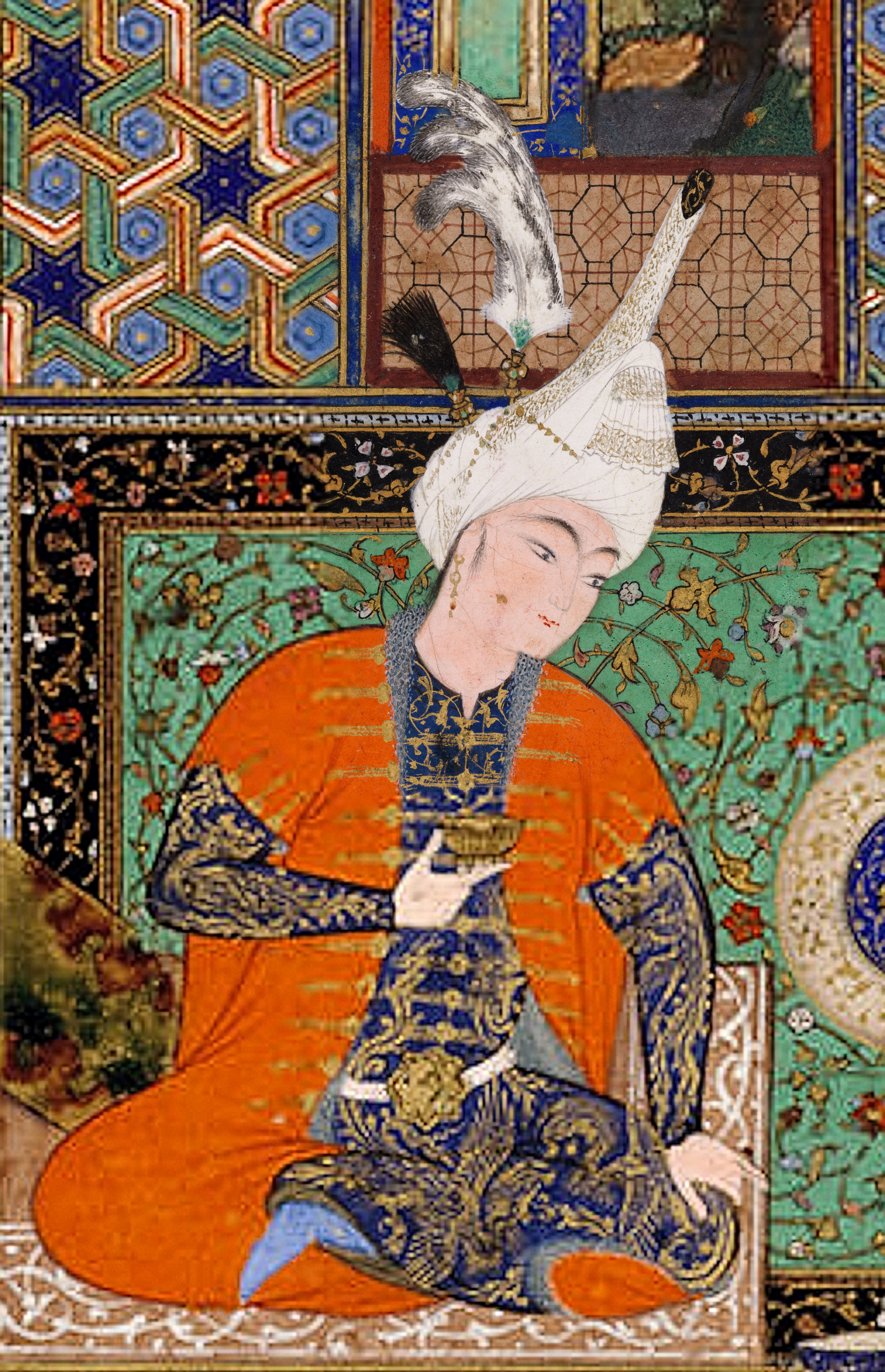
Shah Tahmasp I at his court in Tabriz, around 26 years old. Nighttime in a City, by Mir Sayyid Ali, c. 1540 (Sackler Museum, 1958.76).

Tahmasp I, in order to reduce the power of Khan Ahmad Khan, who had shown signs of misbehaviour and had not been at the court for 20 years, appointed a son of Soltan Mahmud and a relative of his, Jamshid Khan, as the new ruler of Bia-pas. Furthermore, he also ordered Khan Ahmad Khan to give Kuchesfahan back to its former ruler Amira Sasan. Although Khan Ahmad Khan had accepted to cede Bia-pas, he refused to cede Kuchesfahan, which he claimed had always been a part of Bia-pish.

This resulted in the latter rebelling. Tahmasp I then sent an envoy under Yulqoli Beg Zu'l-Qadr to Gilan in order to make peace. In June 1567, Khan Ahmad Khan's commander Shah Mansur Lahiji inflicted a heavy defeat on Amira Sasan near Siah-rudbar. Around the same time, Yulqoli Beg Zu'l-Qadr, who was at Rasht, was killed and beheaded—his head was sent to Khan Ahmad Khan, who shortly entered Rasht in celebration.

Tahmasp I, still hoping to be able to make peace, sent an aggressive letter to Khan Ahmad Khan, reciting his crimes and rebellious behaviour, but promising to pardon him if he would visit the court. The latter shortly sent a letter back, making excuses for not visiting the court for 20 years, but stated he still refused to visit the court. Tahmasp I, already enraged at Khan Ahmad Khan for having Soltan Mahmud poisoned, and hiding the wanted Ghiyat al-Din Mansur from the Safavids, sent a group of troops under several Qizilbash chieftains to Gilan to capture him. Khan Ahmad Khan quickly assembled his men and prepared for battle, but his army under Kiya Rostam, the military governor of Rasht, was shortly defeated, forcing him to flee.

=== Imprisonment ===
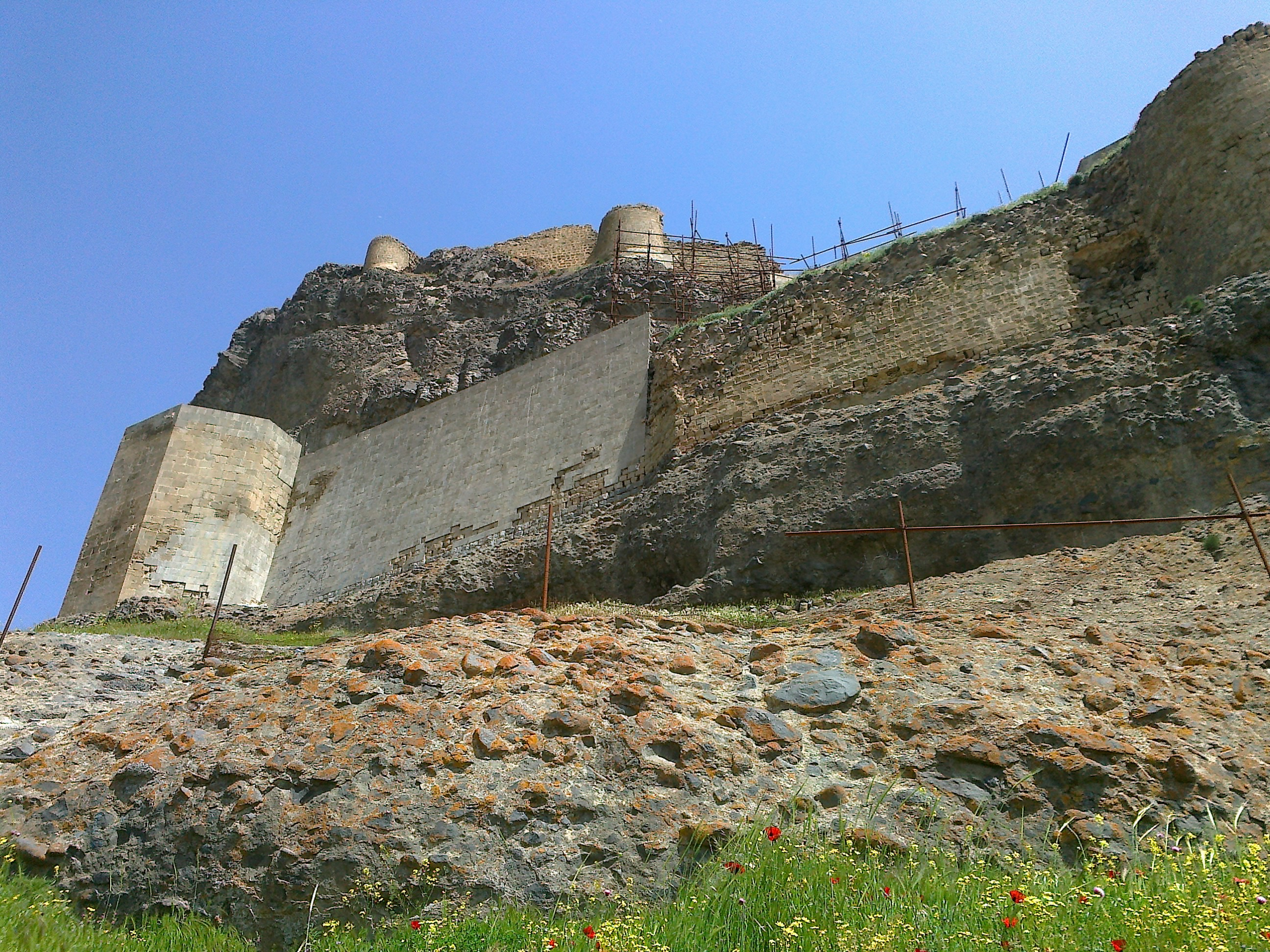
Picture of the Qahqaheh Castle.

The Safavid army in Gilan brought horror to its inhabitants by looting and destroying estates and killing people while searching for Khan Ahmad Khan, who was in the end captured and imprisoned in the Qahqaheh Castle in Azerbaijan. During his time there, he befriended Tahmasp's son Ismail. Tahmasp, worrying that a rebellion would occur in the castle, sent Khan Ahmad Khan to a fortress in Estakhr in Fars, where he would remain for 10 years.

When Tahmasp died in 1576, Ismail was freed by his Qizilbash supporters, who shortly killed his brother Haydar Mirza Safavi, due to his claim to the throne. They thereafter crowned him as the new shah. After his accession, he ordered Khan Ahmad Khan to be released, an order, which, however, was not executed by his men. Ismail II was assassinated the following year, and was succeeded by his older but weaker brother Mohammad Khodabanda, who, at the proposal of his queen Khayr al-Nisa Begum (who was a close relative of Khan Ahmad Khan) had Khan Ahmad Khan released. He was thereafter taken to Qazvin, where Mohammad Khodabanda gave him one of his sisters (Maryam Begum) in marriage and restored him as the ruler of Bia-pish.

=== Second reign ===
Khan Ahmad Khan's return to Gilan was the start of a new period of fierce conflicts that would last for 15 years and would even involve the governor of Shirvan. Right when Khan Ahmad Khan arrived in Gilan, he invaded Bia-pas, but was routed by Jamshid Khan, who had the captives slaughtered and their heads put together so it looked like a minaret. This, however, did not stop Khan Ahmad Khan's hopes of conquering Bia-pas, which he would invade several more times.

== Aftermath ==
Shah Abbas arrived in Lahijan a few days later, where he had Khan Ahmad Khan's palace totally destroyed, and appointed Mehdi Qoli Khan Shamlu as the governor of Bia-pish, while Ali Beg Soltan was appointed as the governor of Bia-pas. Khan Ahmad Khan's former vizier Khvajeh Masih Gilani, who had earlier fled to the Safavid court, played a major role in the invasion of Gilan, and was for that awarded with the title of rish-safīd ("the elder") of Bia-pish.

A few years later—in 1594/5—the Safavid grand vizier Hatem Beg Ordubadi, together with a group of administrators and accountants, were sent to Gilan, where they improved the structure of tax charge and contribution, which, supposedly, was done at the demand of the residents who were discontent with the oppressive governorship of Mehdi Qoli Khan Shamlu. More likely, however, this reform took place due to the economic capability the province offered—its rich silk manufacture, tea, caviar, and lumber encouraged Abbas I to dispatch his most prominent officers to overhaul the economic system of the province in a just approach.

== Sources ==
- Kasheff, Manouchehr (2001). "GĪLĀN v. History under the Safavids". Encyclopaedia Iranica, Vol. X, Fasc. 6. pp. 635–642.
- Matthee, Rudi (1999). "FARHĀD KHAN QARAMĀNLŪ, ROKN-AL-SALṬANA". Encyclopaedia Iranica.
- Nashat, Guity; Beck, Lois (2003). Women in Iran from the Rise of Islam to 1800. University of Illinois Press. pp. 1–253. ISBN 978-0-252-07121-8.
- Newman, Andrew J. (2008). Safavid Iran: Rebirth of a Persian Empire. I.B.Tauris. pp. 1–281. ISBN 9780857716613.
- Babaie, Sussan (2004). Slaves of the Shah: New Elites of Safavid Iran. I.B.Tauris. pp. 1–218. ISBN 9781860647215.
- Matthee, Rudi (1999). The Politics of Trade in Safavid Iran: Silk for Silver, 1600-1730. Cambridge University Press. pp. 1–290. ISBN 0521641314.
- Mitchell, Colin P. (2009). The Practice of Politics in Safavid Iran: Power, Religion and Rhetoric. I.B.Tauris. pp. 1–304. ISBN 978-0857715883.

Preceded by Soltan-Hasan Kiya	King of the Karkiya dynasty 1538–1592	Succeeded by Safavid rule
