= Haydar Mirza =

Youngest son of the Safavid empire prince Hamza Mirza

Haydar Mirza حیدر میرزا
- Mirza
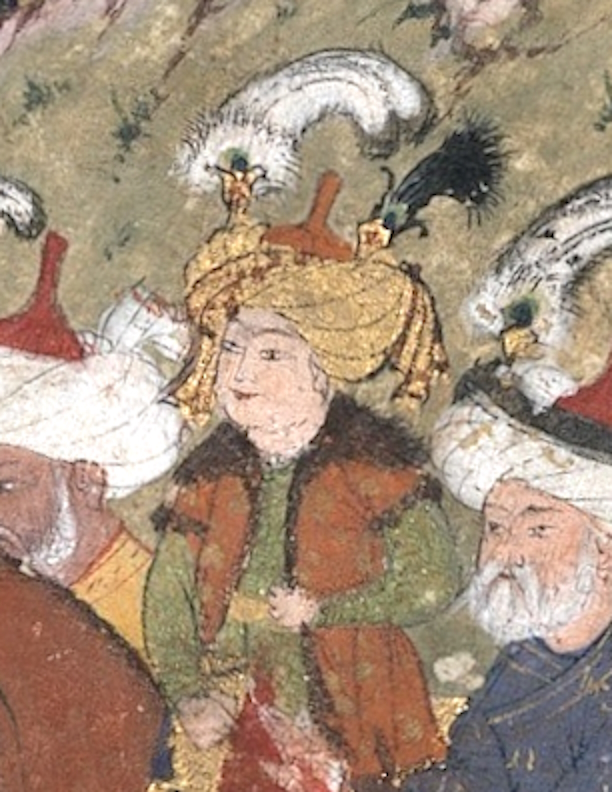
- Haydar Mirza entering Istanbul as a hostage in 1590. Divan of Mahmud Abd al-Baki (1590-95).

Safavid Crown Prince
- Born: 1585; Safavid Empire
- Died: 1596 (aged 10–11); Constantinople, Ottoman Empire
- Dynasty: Safavid
- Father: Hamza Mirza
- Religion: Twelver Shia Islam

Haydar Mirza (1585-1596) was the youngest son of the Safavid Empire prince Hamza Mirza, and the nephew of the current Safavid ruler Shah Abbas. He was sent by Shah Abbas as a hostage to the Ottoman court in 1590, at the age of 5 or 6 years old, in order to secure the Treaty of Constantinople (1590), putting an end to the Ottoman–Safavid War (1578–1590). He died in Constantinople in 1596.

The embassy accompanying Haydar Mirza to Istanbul was composed of about six hundred people. It was led by ambassador Mahdiquli Khan, and the prince’s guardian (ātābeg or lālā) Shahimquli Khalifa. An illustrated Ottoman manuscript, the Book of Treasury of the Conquest of Ganja, records the details of the reception, including a feast given for the embassy in the city of Erzurum, where the Prince appears as the guest of honour, at the head of the table, to the right of Ottoman Commander Ferhad Pasha, and next to the ambassador Mahdiquli Khan.

The scene of his arrival in Istanbul appears in folio from a Divan of Mahmud `Abd al-Baqi, painted soon after the event in 1590-1595. The scene shows an Ottoman army led by Sokulluzade Hasan Pasha entering the city, together with a group of Persians wearing Safavid turbans accompanying a young prince on a horse. The Turkish inscription in the miniature reads "Good news for the Persians, may they be happy. Mir Haidar [a prince of 'Ali], the light of the eyes of Iran, is coming". Further, the scene illustrates a panegeric poem entitled “In Praise of Sultan Murad Khan, on Whom Be God’s Mercy and Pardon, by Way of Congratulations for the Arrival of the Son of the Shah of Iran.”

The scene also appears in various Habsburg and Ottoman manuscripts. Large crowds came to see and welcome the arrival of the Prince, and the reception what on a par with that of previous Safavid embassies to the Ottoman court.

The Venetian ambassador (bailo) Giovanni Moro was a witness to the Safavid procession, which he reported.

Numerous gifts accompanied Haydar Mirza to be offered to the Ottoman court. They were recorded precisely in several manuscripts. Among them were 18 precious illustrated manuscripts, a gold-embroidered turban cloth for the sultan and various other gold-woven cloths, Persian carpets, a large tent, an antidote in a golden inkwell, and numerous pieces of the mūmiyāʾ-i maʿdenī mineral drug with legendary curative properties.

The Prince died 5 years after his arrival in Istanbul, at the age of about 11 years old. He was said to have died from the plague, but a Venetian account reported discontent in Istanbul about the "suspicious conditions" of his death at such a young age. An Ottoman historian claims that he was poisoned by Safavids themselves in order to break the peace. A tradition reports that his grave was stolen one night, and transported back to Safavid Iran.

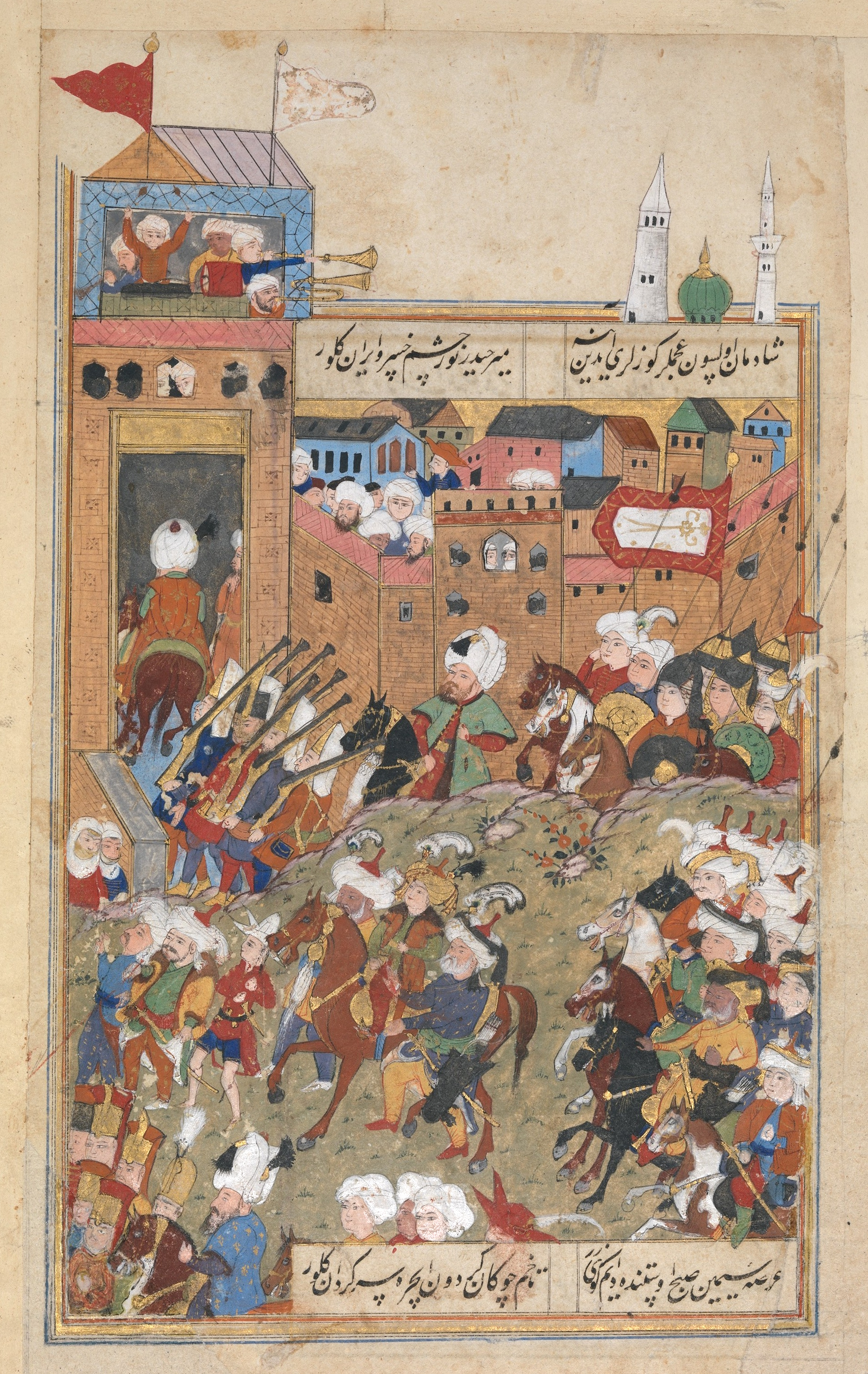
Heydar Mirza’s entrance into Istanbul as hostage in 1590. Divan of Mahmud Abd al-Baki, 1590–95

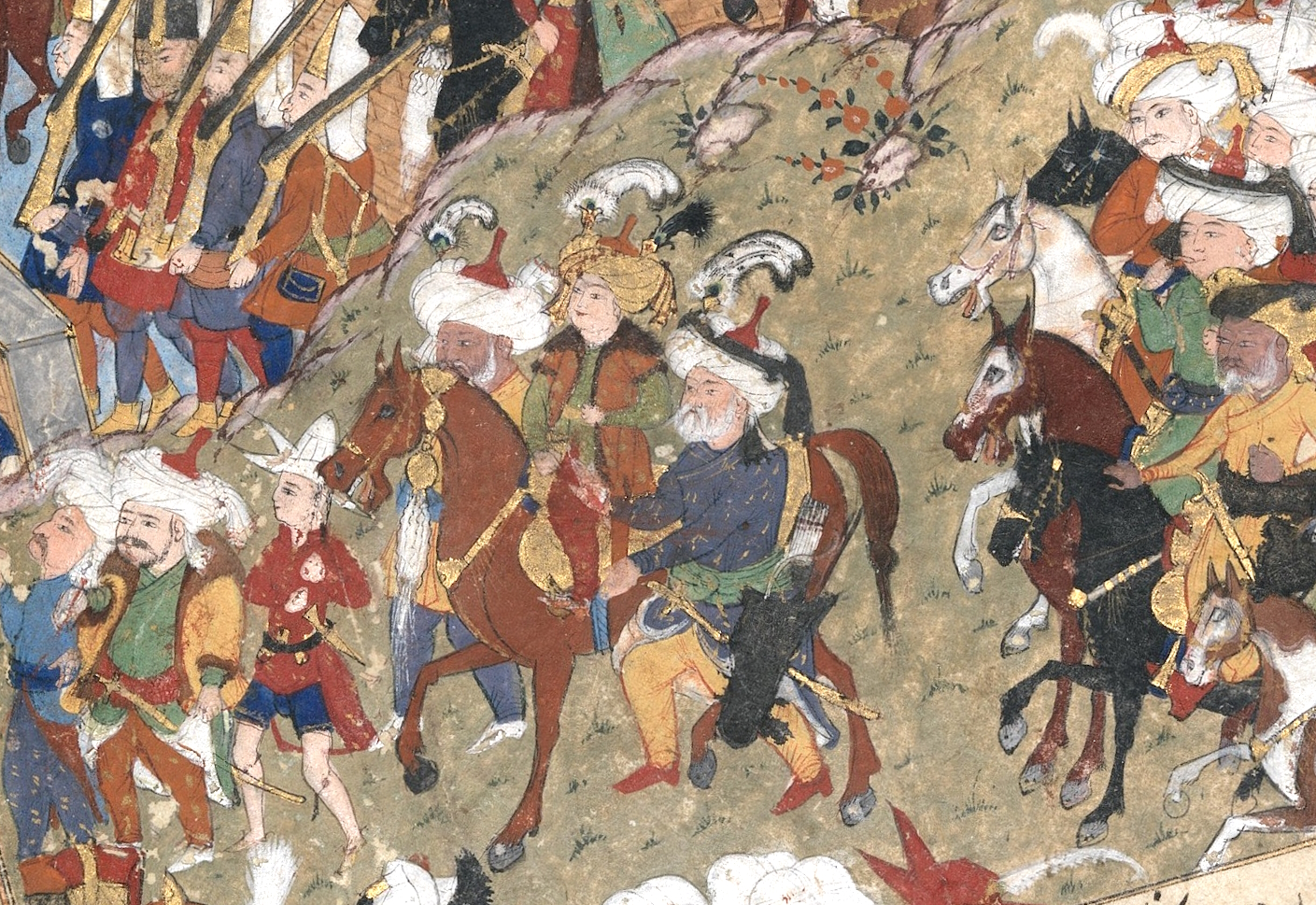
Heydar Mirza with his retinue entering Istanbul

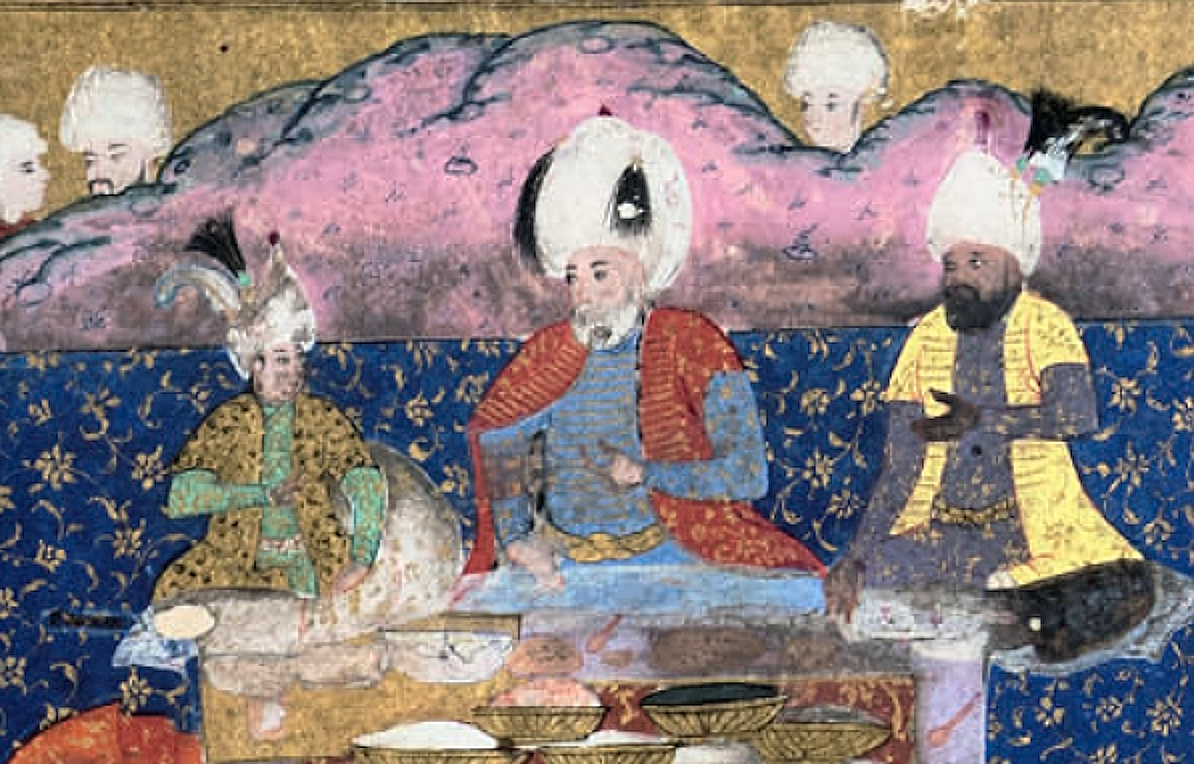
Banquet scene in Erzurum, with Prince Haydar Mirza (left), Ottoman commander Ferhad Pasha (center) and Safavid ambassador Mahdiquli Khan (right).

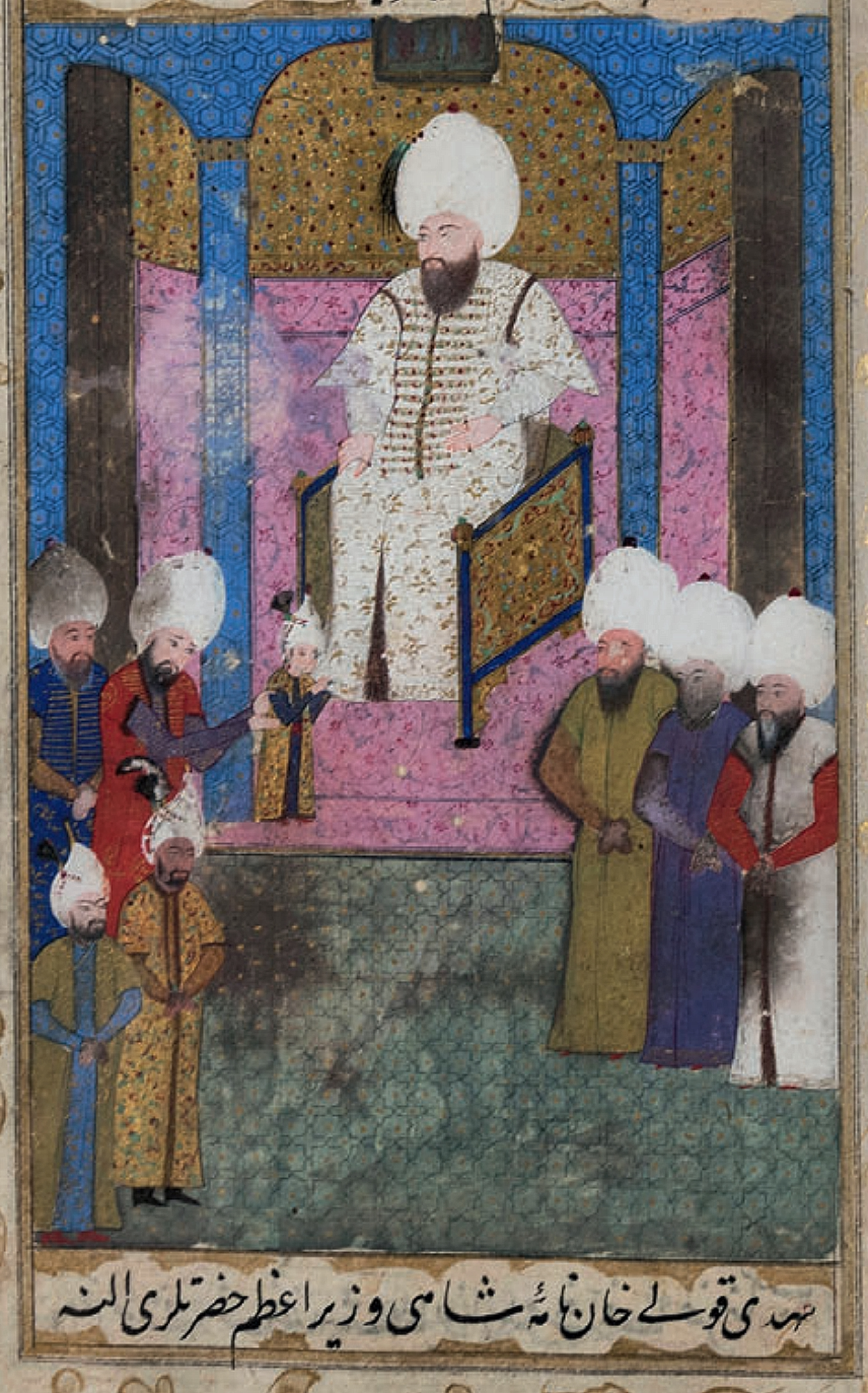
Sultan Murad III receiving the minuscule child Haydar Mirza at the Topkapı Palace in Istanbul

== Sources ==
- Casale, Sinem Arcak (2023). Gifts in the Age of Empire. Ottoman-Safavid Cultural Exchange, 1500–1639. The University of Chicago Press. ISBN 978-0226820422.
- Casale, Sinem (26 January 2016). "A Peace for a Prince: The Reception of a Safavid Child Hostage at the Ottoman Court". Journal of Early Modern History. 20 (1): 39–62. doi:10.1163/15700658-12342496.
