= Bâkî =

Ottoman Turkish poet

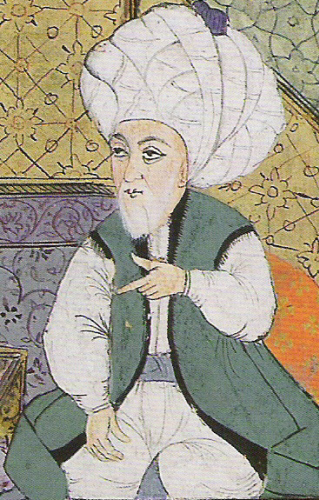
Bâkî (1526–1600)

Bâḳî (باقى) was the pen name (Ottoman Turkish: مخلص mahlas) of the Ottoman Turkish poet Mahmud Abdülbâkî (محمود عبدالباقى) (1526 – 1600). Considered one of the greatest contributors to Turkish literature, Bâkî came to be known as Sultânüş-şuarâ (سلطان الشعرا), or "Sultan of poets".

== Life ==
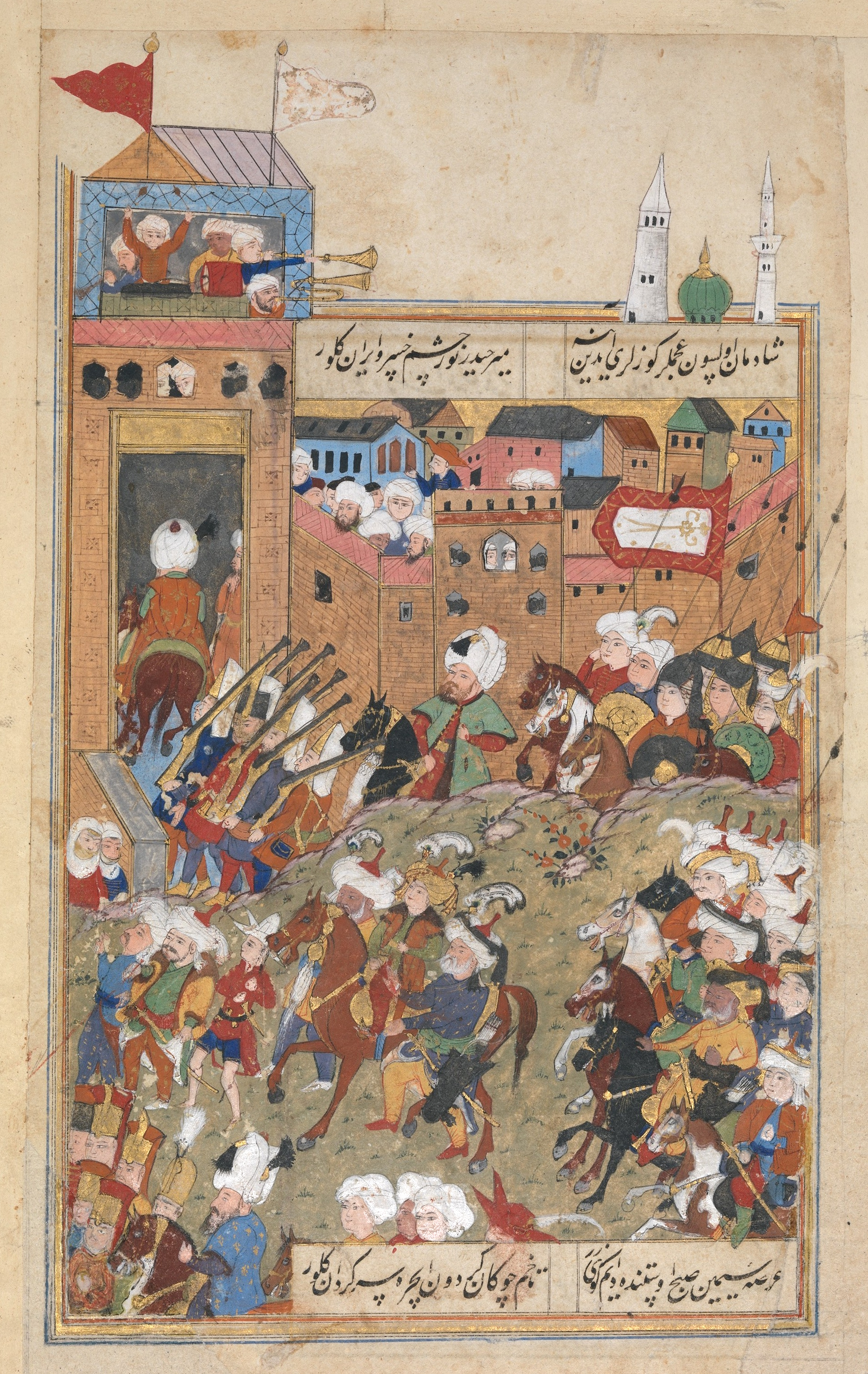
Sokulluzade Hasan Pasha, here in 1590 escorting the hostage Safavid Prince Haydar Mirza into Istanbul. Divan of Mahmud Abd al-Baki (1590-95)

Bâkî was born to a poor family in Constantinople, his father being a muezzin at the Fatih Mosque. Originally, his family apprenticed him to a harness-maker, but he would often skip work to attend classes at a nearby medrese (Islamic school). Because of this, his family eventually allowed him to formally attend school. Bâkî was a good student, and he attended the lectures of many of the famous lecturers of the time. It was during his school years that his interest in and talent for poetry began to take shape, helped largely by the established poet Zâtî (ذاتی) (1471–1548). After completing school, he worked for some time as a teacher, but later, as his poetic fame began to grow, he was granted a number of different positions—generally as a kadı (ﻗﺎضی), or Islamic judge—in the Ottoman bureaucracy. Bâkî died in Istanbul in the year 1600.

Bâkî was always very close to the Ottoman palace, particularly during the reign of Süleymân I, with whom he had good relations. During the subsequent reigns of Selim II and Murad III, he remained close to the palace and to state affairs, and received a great deal of attention and interest both from the public and the palace.

== Works ==
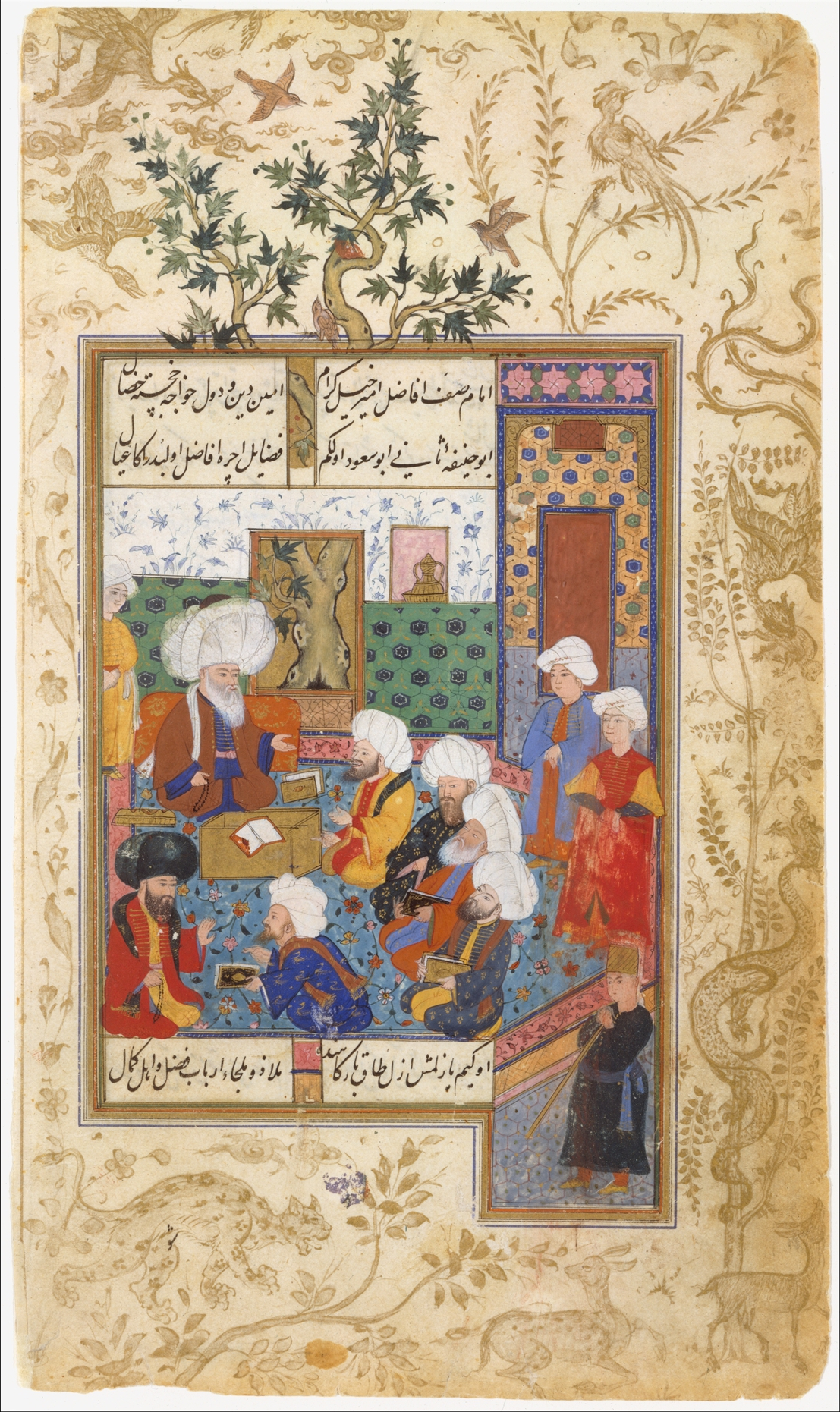
"The Great Abu Sa'ud Teaching Law", Folio from a Divan of Mahmud `Abd-al Baqi

Bâkî lived during the height of the Ottoman Empire, and this affected his poetry greatly. Love, the joy of living, and nature are the primary subjects of his poems. Although almost no Sufi influence is found in his poetry—as it is in many other Ottoman-era poets—his concept of love as revealed in his poetry was not entirely divorced from the Sufi concept thereof.

One of his most celebrated works is his Mersiye-i Hazret-i Süleymân Hân (مرثیه ﺣﻀﺮت سليمان خان; "Elegy for His Excellency Süleymân Khan"), among the most famed of elegiac works in Turkish literature.

He also authored his Divan of Mahmud Abd al-Baki (1590-95), a collection of poetical works describing courtly life in Istanbul in the 16th century.

== Sources ==
- Shaw, Stanford J. (1976), History of the Ottoman Empire and Modern Turkey: Volume 1, Empire of the Gazis: The Rise and Decline of the Ottoman Empire 1280-1808, Cambridge University Press, ISBN 9780521291637.
- E. J. Brill's First Encyclopaedia of Islam 1913-1936, E. J. Brill, 1987, ISBN 9004082654.
