= Khan's Garden =

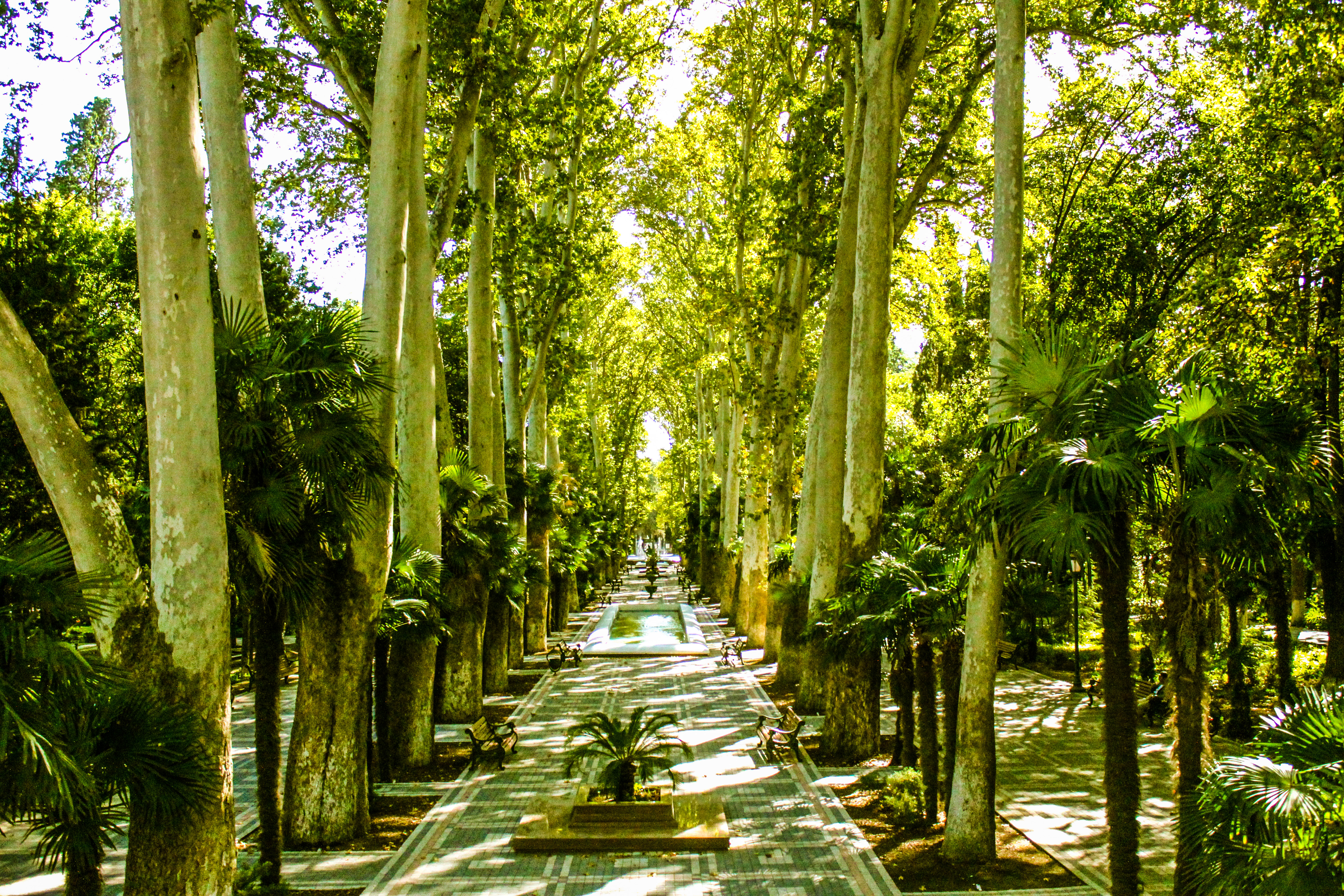
Khan's Garden in Ganja

Khan's Garden (Azerbaijani: Xan bağı, Persian: باغ خان) is a garden and resting corner located in Ganja, Azerbaijan.

== History ==
Javad Khan, a member of the Iranian Qajar dynasty, and the last khan of the Ganja khanate from 1786 to 1804, was a naturalist. The name of the garden is related to his name. He had a 52 hectare garden. He would order rare trees from merchants traveling to the city. Foreign guests would also bring him different trees and flowers.

Part of the garden went to Ganja Fortress that Ottoman warlord Serdar Ferhad Pasha erected in 1588. Actually it was assumed that the garden was also made by Serdar Ferhad Pasha in 1582. The battle of Javad Khan's squad for Russians was also there. Therefore, Mikhail Semyonovich Vorontsov decided to eradicate the garden from the earth along with the Ganja Fortress.

In 1847 on the initiative of Vorontsov, in the lower part of the Khan's garden, about six hectares the foundation of the city park named after Sardar was laid. Khan's Garden where was historically a resting-place for khans in Ganja, was abolished after the Russian invasion and some of the trees there were relocated to Sardar Garden.

After the reconstruction works, the garden was given the previous name and called Khan's Garden again. The garden is currently one of the main rest places of the people in Ganja.
