= Treaty of Constantinople (1590) =

Treaty between the Ottoman Empire and the Safavid Empire

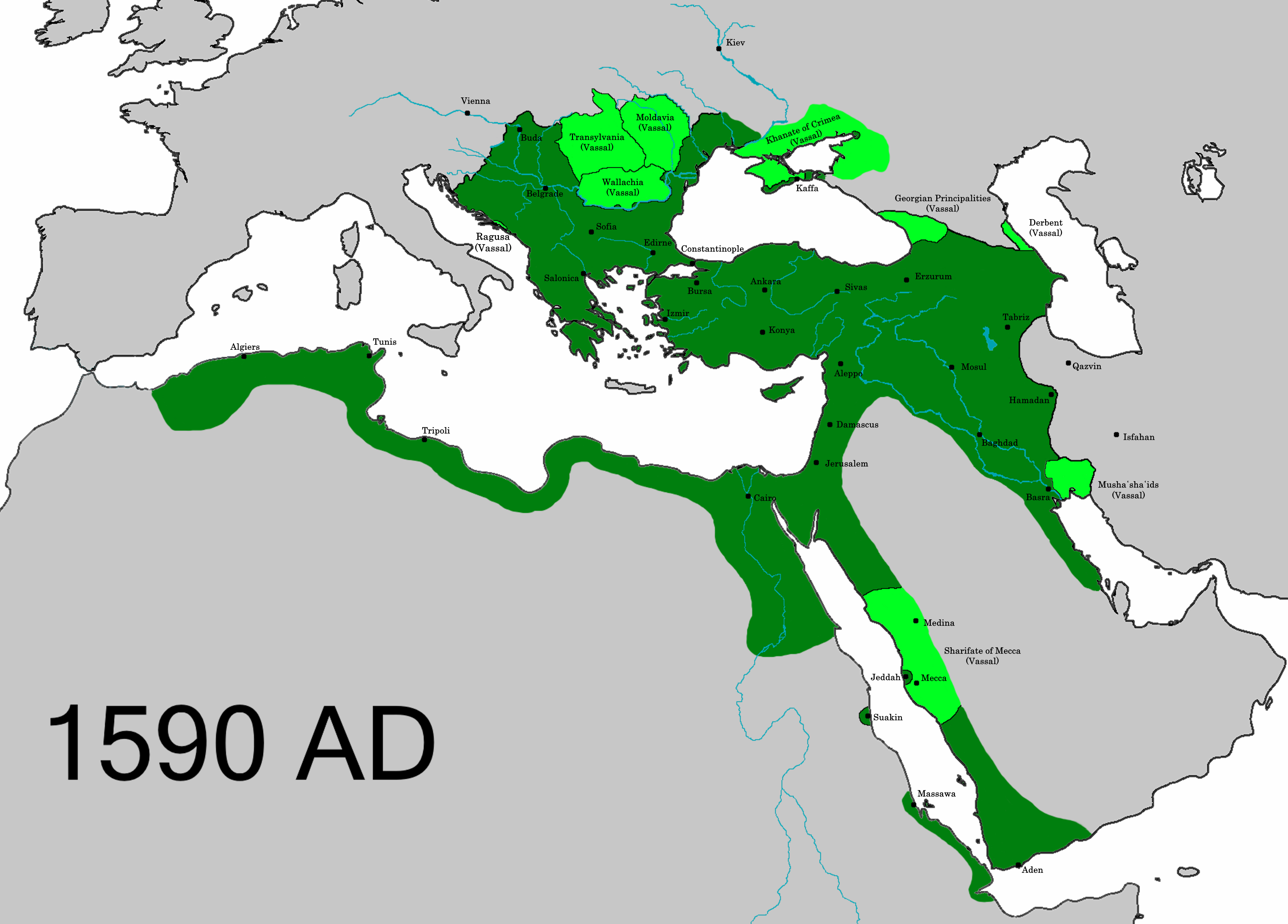
The Ottoman Empire and its client states in 1590 AD. Aftermath of the Treaty of Constantinople.

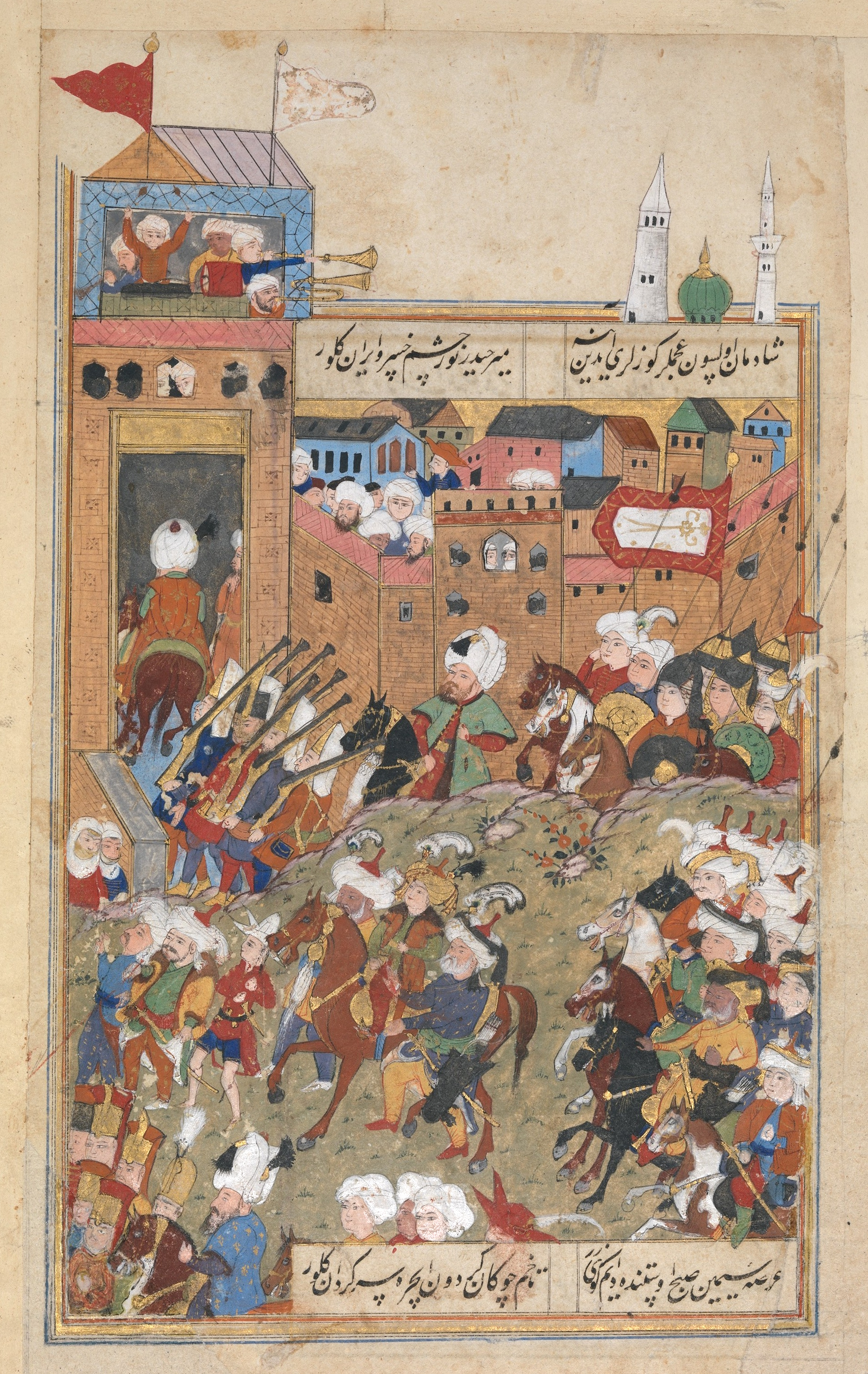
Entrance of Safavid Prince Haydar Mirza (forefront), son of Hamza Mirza, in Istanbul as an hostage in 1590. Ottoman troops (center) are led by Sokulluzade Hasan Pasha. Divan of Mahmud Abd al-Baki, 1590–95.

The Treaty of Constantinople, also known as the Peace of Istanbul or the Treaty of Ferhad Pasha (Turkish: Ferhat Paşa Antlaşması), was a treaty between the Ottoman Empire and the Safavid Empire ending the Ottoman–Safavid War of 1578–1590. It was signed on 21 March 1590 in Constantinople (present-day Istanbul). The war started when the Ottomans, then ruled by Murad III, invaded the Safavid possessions in Georgia, during a period of Safavid weakness. With the empire beleaguered on numerous fronts and its domestic control plagued by civil wars and court intrigues, the new Safavid king Abbas I, who had been placed on the throne in 1588, opted for unconditional peace, which led to the treaty. The treaty put an end to 12 years of hostilities between the two arch rivals. While both the war and the treaty were a success for the Ottomans, and severely disadvantageous for the Safavids, the new status quo proved to be short lived, as in the next bout of hostilities, several years later, all Safavid losses were recovered.

== War ==
At the time the war commenced, the Safavid Empire was in a chaotic state under its weak ruler, Mohammad Khodabanda. In the resulting fighting, the Ottomans had managed to take most of the Safavid provinces of Azerbaijan (including the former capital Tabriz), Georgia (Kartli, Kakheti, eastern Samtskhe-Meskheti), Karabagh, Erivan, Shirvan and Khuzestan, despite Mohammad Khodabanda's initially successful counterattack. When Abbas I succeeded to the throne in 1588, the Safavid realm was still plagued by domestic issues, and thus the Ottomans managed to push further, taking Baghdad during that year and Ganja shortly after. Confronted by even more problems (i.e. civil wars, uprisings, and the war against the Uzbeks in the northeastern part of the realm), Abbas I agreed to sign a humiliating treaty with disadvantageous terms.

== Treaty ==
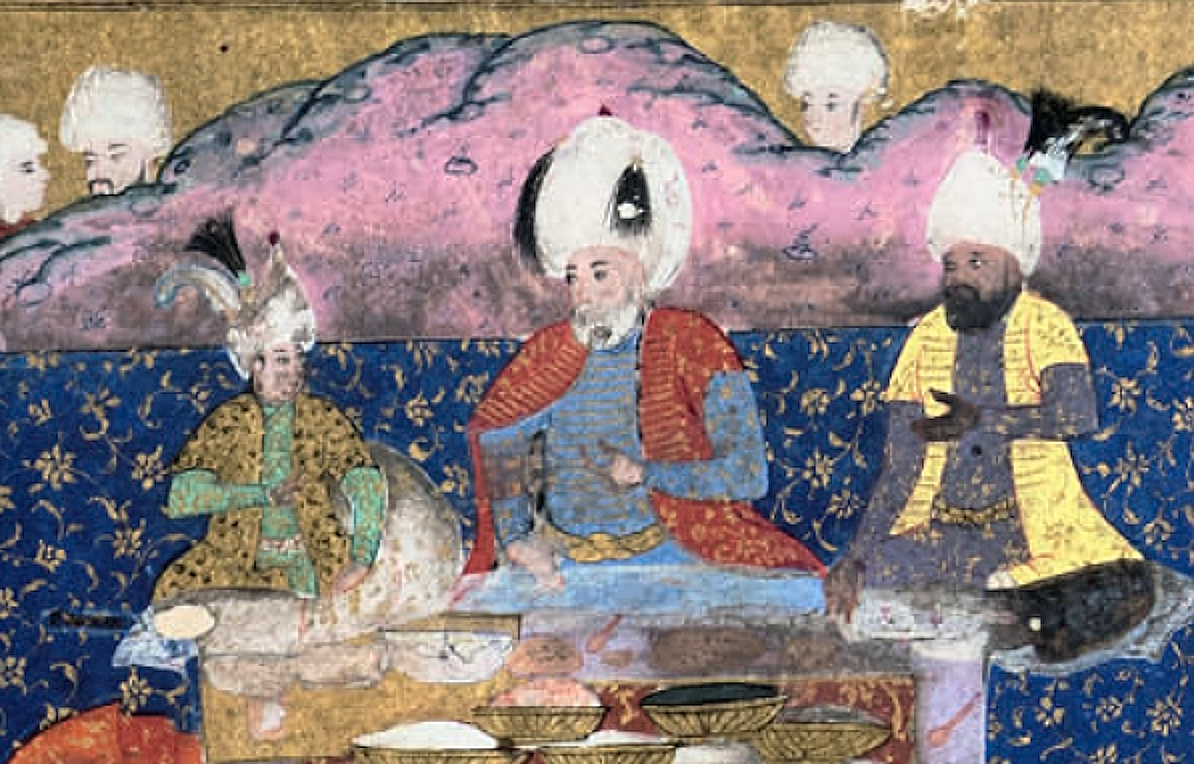
Banquet scene in Erzurum, with hostage Safavid Prince Haydar Mirza (left), Ottoman commander Ferhad Pasha (center) and Safavid ambassador Mahdiquli Khan (right) in 1590.

According to the treaty, the Ottoman Empire kept most of its gains in the war. These included most of the southern Caucasus (which included the Safavid domains in Georgia, composed of the Kingdoms of Kartli and Kakheti and the eastern part of the Samtskhe-Meskheti principality, as well as the Erivan Province, Karabakh, and Shirvan), the Azerbaijan Province (including Tabriz, but not Ardabil, which remained in Safavid hands), Luristan, Dagestan, most of the remaining parts of Kurdistan, Shahrizor, Khuzestan, Baghdad and Mesopotamia. A clause was included in the treaty that stipulated that the Safavids would have to stop cursing the first three caliphs, as had been common ever since the first major Ottoman-Safavid treaty, namely the Peace of Amasya (1555). The Persians also agreed to pay obeisance to religious leaders of the Sunni faith.

== Aftermath ==
This treaty was a success for the Ottoman Empire, as vast areas had been annexed. However, the new status quo did not last long. Abbas I would use the time and resources which resulted from the peace on the main front with the Ottomans, to successfully deal with the other issues (including the Uzbeks and other revolts), while waiting for a suitable moment to regain his possessions. When the Ottoman Empire during the reign of young sultan Ahmet I was engaged with the Celali revolts, he was able to regain most of his losses, which the Ottoman Empire had to accept in the Treaty of Nasuh Pasha, 22 years after this treaty.

== See also ==
- Ottoman–Safavid War (1603–1618)
- List of treaties

== Sources ==
- Bengio, Ofra; Litvak, Meir (2014). Epilogue: The Sunni-Shi'i paradox. New York: Palgrave Macmillan. p. 405. ISBN 978-0-2301-2092-1.
- Casale, Sinem (2016). "A Peace for a Prince: The Reception of a Safavid Child Hostage at the Ottoman Court". Journal of Early Modern History. 20 (1): 39–62. doi:10.1163/15700658-12342496. ISSN 1385-3783.
- Casale, Sinem Arcak (2023). Gifts in the Age of Empire. Ottoman-Safavid Cultural Exchange, 1500–1639. The University of Chicago Press. ISBN 978-0226820422.
- Blow, David (2009). Shah Abbas: The Ruthless King Who Became an Iranian Legend. I.B.Tauris. ISBN 978-0857716767.
- Floor, Willem (2001). Safavid Government Institutions. Costa Mesa, California: Mazda Publishers. ISBN 978-1568591353.
- Floor, Willem; Herzig, Edmund, eds. (2015). Iran and the World in the Safavid Age. I.B.Tauris. ISBN 978-1780769905.
- Iorga, Nicolae: Geschichte des Osmanischen Reichs Vol. III, (trans: Nilüfer Epçeli) Yeditepe Yayınları, 2009, ISBN 975-6480-20-3
- Matthee, Rudolph P. (1999). The Politics of Trade in Safavid Iran: Silk for Silver, 1600-1730. Cambridge University Press. ISBN 978-0521641319.
- Meri, Josef W.; Bacharach, Jere L. (2006). Medieval Islamic Civilization: L-Z, index. Taylor & Francis. p. 581. ISBN 978-0415966924.
- Mikaberidze, Alexander, ed. (2011). "Ottoman-Safavid Wars". Conflict and Conquest in the Islamic World: A Historical Encyclopedia. ABC-CLIO. ISBN 978-1598843361.
- Mitchell, Colin p. (2009). The Practice of Politics in Safavid Iran: Power, Religion and Rhetoric. I.B.Tauris. ISBN 978-0857715883.
- Newman, Andrew J. (2012). Safavid Iran: Rebirth of a Persian Empire. I.B.Tauris. ISBN 978-0857716613.
- Roemer, H. R. (1986). "The Safavid Period". In Jackson, Peter; Lockhart, Laurence (eds.). The Cambridge History of Iran. Vol. 6. Cambridge University Press. ISBN 978-1139054980.
