= Serdar Ferhad Pasha =

Grand Vizier of the Ottoman Empire (1591–1592, 1595)

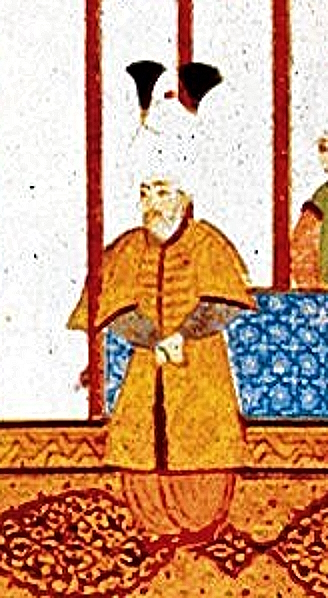
- Serdar Ferhad Pasha. Kitâb-ı Gencîne-i Feth-i Gence, TSMK, Revan Köşkü, no. 1296 (1600)

Grand Vizier of the Ottoman Empire
- In office 1 August 1591 – 4 April 1592
- Monarch: Murad III
- Preceded by: Koca Sinan Pasha
- Succeeded by: Kanijeli Siyavuş Pasha
- In office 6 February 1595 – 7 July 1595
- Monarch: Mehmed III
- Preceded by: Koca Sinan Pasha
- Succeeded by: Koca Sinan Pasha

Personal details
- Born: c. 1530 Albania (then Ottoman Empire)
- Died: October 1595 Istanbul, Ottoman Empire (modern Turkey)
- Spouse: Hümaşah Sultan (m. 1591)

Serdar Ferhat Paşa (Ottoman Turkish: سردار فرهاد پاشا; Turkish: Serdar Ferhat Paşa) was an Ottoman statesman of Albanian origin. He was twice grand vizier of the Ottoman Empire between 1 August 1591 and 4 April 1592 and between 16 February 1595 and 7 July 1595.

== Career ==
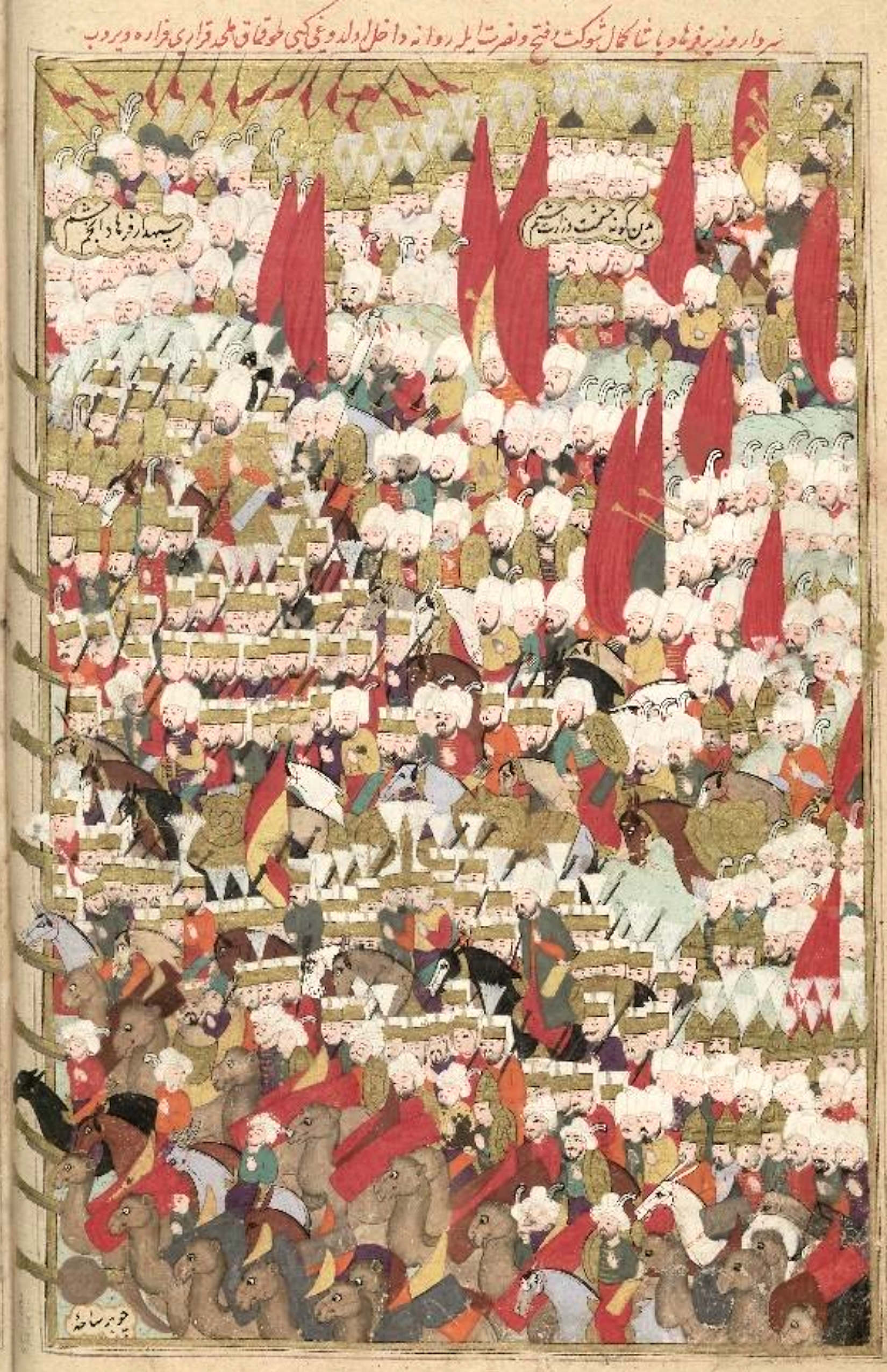
Serdar Ferhat Pasha's conquest of Yerevan against Tokhmaq Khan Ustajlu in 1583. Şehinşahname, TSKM B.200 (1592).

He became Agha of the Janissaries on 25 February 1582, but lost his position because of Koca Sinan Pasha. In 1582 he was appointed vizier by Grand Visier Siyavus Pasha and joined Ottoman forces during the Safavid wars where he soon became second commander (serdar). He made Tebriz his military base and captured Ganja. He led the second expedition of the Crimean campaign (1584). He attended peaceful negotiations with Shah Abbas I in Istanbul through the Safavid embassy. The Treaty of Ferhad Pasha of 1590 ending the Ottoman–Safavid War (1578–1590) (also called the Treaty of Constantinople) was named for him.

His successful campaign during the Safavid wars returned him to the position of Grand Vizier on 1 August 1591, but he lost his position on 4 April 1592 again by the intrigue of Koca Sinan Pasha.

During his second term, he campaigned against Michael the Brave, the ruler who rebelled in Wallachia. He ordered a bridge be built between Ruse and Giurgiu across the Danube. During preparations, he faced a military uprising at the gate of Divan-ı Hümayun. More than 1000 kuloğulları requested wages from the grand vizier for their campaign during the Safewid wars but he rejected that claim. They infiltrated the troops and organized them against the Grand Vizier. Ferhad Pasha blamed Koca Sinan Pasha and Cığalazade Yusuf Sinan Pasha for that provocation and ordered punishment for both. Later he relented and exiled Koca Sinan Pasha to Malkara and Cığalazade to Karahisar-ı Şarki.

Ibrahim Pasha, the second vizier, who was appointed as kaymakam to the Porte, incited Sultan Murad III about the dismissal of Ferhad Pasha. On 7 July 1595, while Ferhad Pasha was trying to build a bridge in Ruse, again lost his position, and Koca Sinan Pasha became grand vizier again.

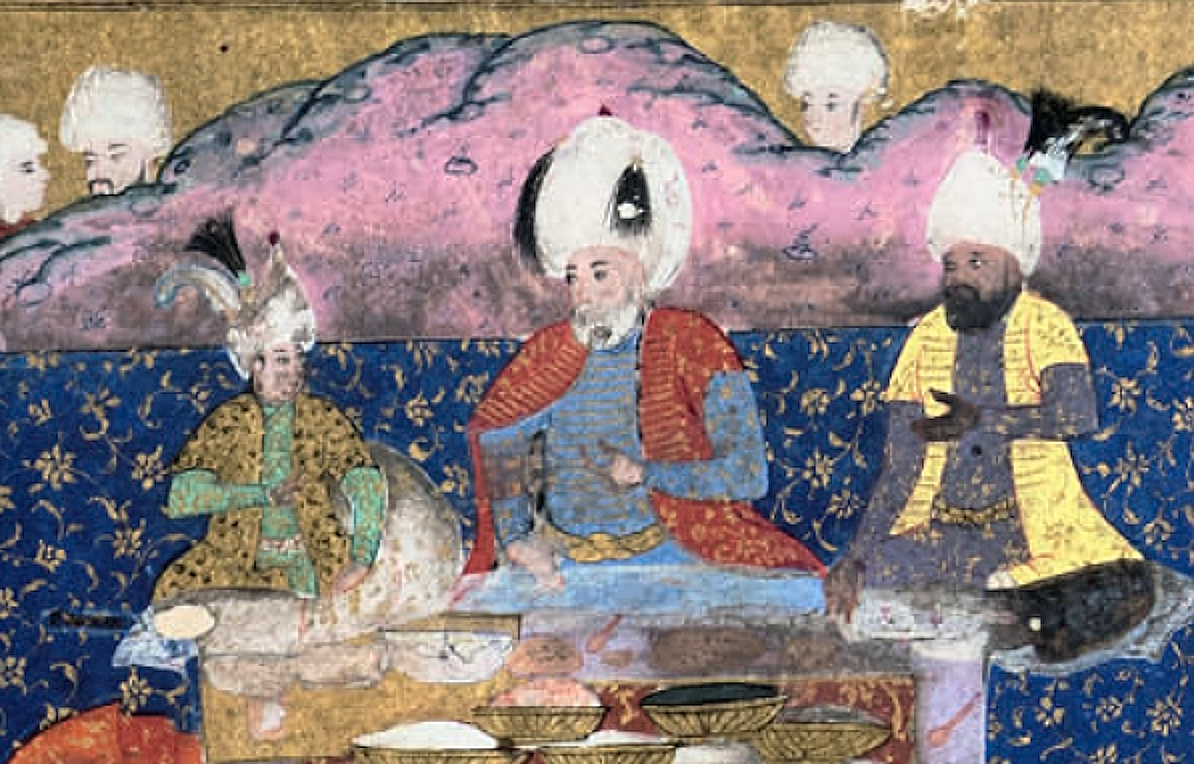
Banquet scene in Erzurum, with hostage Safavid Prince Haydar Mirza (left), Ferhad Pasha (center) and Safavid ambassador Mahdiquli Khan (right) in 1590.

Ferhâd Pasha had taken lessons from Ahmed Karahisari during his education in Enderûn-ı Hümâyûn. Karahisai was one of the important figures of the culture and art environments of the period. Whenever he had the opportunity, he would copy the mushâf-ı şerîf and would sell the Qur'an-i-kerîms he wrote. Two of the mushafs he wrote are in the Museum of Turkish and Islamic Arts and the Library of the Topkapı Palace Museum.

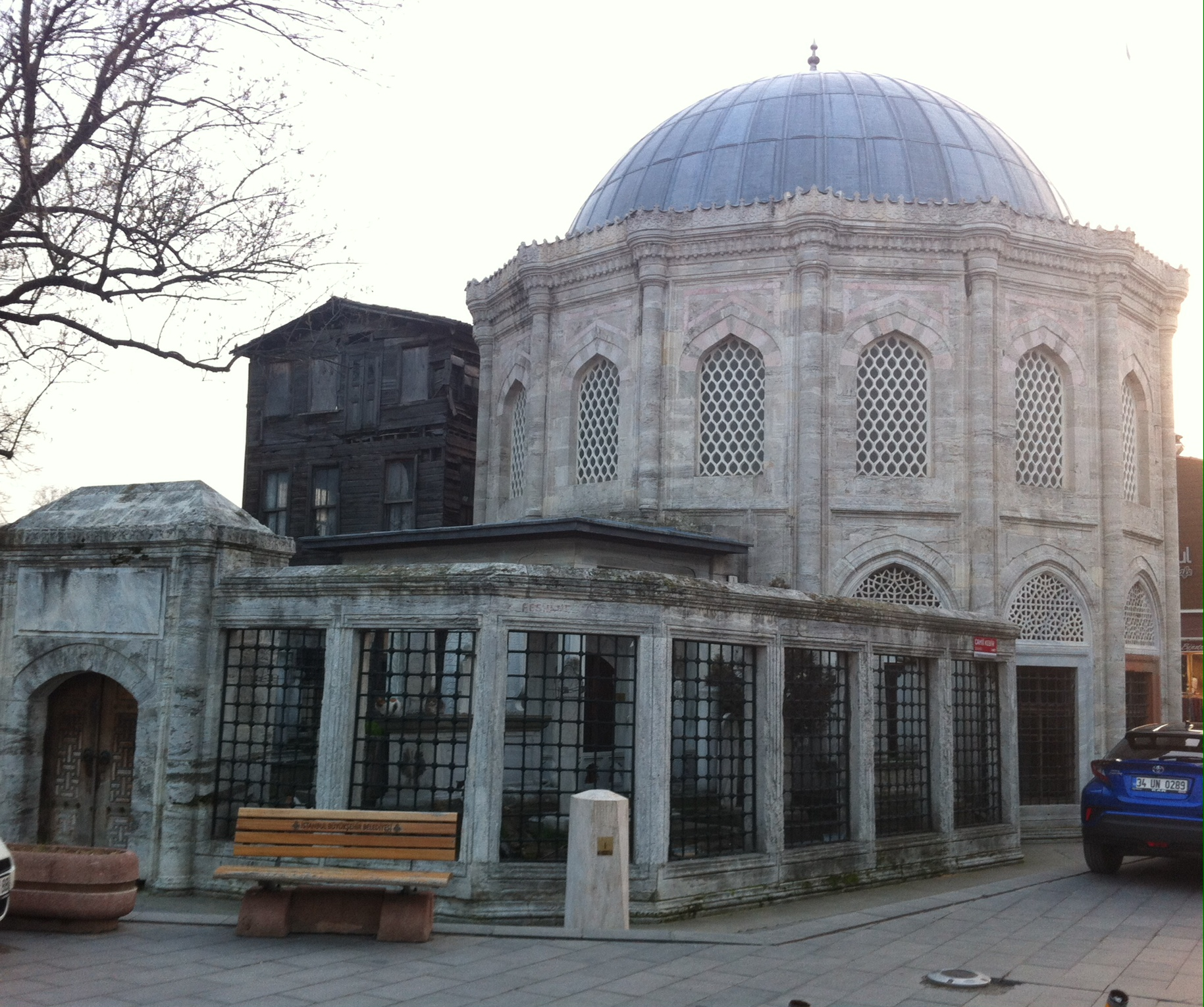
Tomb of Serdar Ferhad Pasha in Eyup Sultan

According to some sources he was married to Hümaşah Sultan, a daughter of Murad III. He also married the only daughter of Ottoman statesman Kızıl Ahmedli Mustafa Pasha.

== See also ==
- Treaty of Ferhad Pasha
- List of Ottoman Grand Viziers

== Sources ==
- Casale, Sinem Arcak (2023). Gifts in the Age of Empire. Ottoman-Safavid Cultural Exchange, 1500–1639. The University of Chicago Press. ISBN 978-0226820422.

Political offices
Preceded by Koca Sinan Pasha	Grand Vizier of the Ottoman Empire; 1 August 1591 – 4 April 1592	Succeeded by Kanijeli Siyavuş Pasha
Preceded by Koca Sinan Pasha	Grand Vizier of the Ottoman Empire; 16 February 1595 – 7 July 1595	Succeeded by Koca Sinan Pasha
