= Kar-Kiya dynasty =

Zaydi Shia dynasty in northern Iran

- 1370s–1592
- Map of the political situation in northern Iran in 1425
- Capital: Lahijan
- Common languages: Gilaki
- Religion: Zaydi Shia Islam (pre-Safavid); Twelver Shia Islam (post-Safavid)
- Government: Monarchy
- Historical era: Post-classical history
  - Established: 1370s
  - Safavid conquest: 1592
Succeeded by
Safavid Iran

The Kar-Kiya dynasty (Persian: کارکیاییان), also known as the Kiya'ids, was a local Iranian Gilaki dynasty who were originally Zaydi, it mainly ruled over Biya-pish (eastern Gilan) from the 1370s to 1592.

The Kar-Kiya dynasty helped Shah Ismail I to establish Safavid Iran and later became one of its vassal states. The Safavid shah, Abbas I put an end to the Kar-Kiya dynasty and the neighbouring Eshaqvand dynasty by dispatching an army to Gilan in 1592.

== List of Kar-Kiya rulers ==
Below is a complete list of the rulers of the Kar-Kiya dynasty:

- Sayyed Ali Kiya (r. 1370s–1389)
- Hady Kiya (r. 1389–1394)
- Amir Sayyed Mohammad (r. 1394–1430)
- Sayyed Razi Kiya (r. 1396–1426)
- Sayyed Hosayn Kiya (r. 1426–1430)
- Sayyed Naser Kiya (r. 1430–1448)
- Soltan-Mohammad Kiya (r. 1448–1478)
- Soltan-Ali Mirza (r. 1478–1504/05)
- Soltan-Hasan (r. 1504/05–1506)
- Soltan-Ahmad Khan (r. 1506–1534)
- Soltan-Kiya Ali (r. 1534–1534/5)
- Soltan-Hasan Kiya (r. 1534/5–1538)
- Khan Ahmad Khan (r. 1538–1592)

== Monuments ==
Sayyed Ali Kiya, Sayyed Hady Kiya and Sayyed Razi Kiya are buried in the historic Chahar Padshahan mausoleum located in Lahijan. The site also entombs one of their ancestors, Sayyed Kar-Kiya, who was killed in 1243 or 1244.

== Sources ==
- Goto, Yukako (2017). "Kār Kiā". Encyclopaedia Iranica.
- Goto, Yukako (2020). "Kār Kiyā dynasty". In Fleet, Kate; Krämer, Gudrun; Matringe, Denis; Nawas, John; Rowson, Everett (eds.). Encyclopaedia of Islam (3rd ed.). Brill Online. ISSN 1873-9830.
- Kasheff, Manouchehr (2001). "GĪLĀN v. History under the Safavids". Encyclopaedia Iranica, Vol. X, Fasc. 6. pp. 635–642.
- Matthee, Rudi (1999). "FARHĀD KHAN QARAMĀNLŪ, ROKN-AL-SALṬANA". Encyclopaedia Iranica.
- Nashat, Guity; Beck, Lois (2003). Women in Iran from the Rise of Islam to 1800. University of Illinois Press. pp. 1–253. ISBN 978-0-252-07121-8.
- Newman, Andrew J. (2008). Safavid Iran: Rebirth of a Persian Empire. I.B.Tauris. pp. 1–281. ISBN 9780857716613.
- Babaie, Sussan (2004). Slaves of the Shah: New Elites of Safavid Iran. I.B.Tauris. pp. 1–218. ISBN 9781860647215.
- Matthee, Rudi (1999). The Politics of Trade in Safavid Iran: Silk for Silver, 1600-1730. Cambridge University Press. pp. 1–290. ISBN 0521641314.
- Mitchell, Colin P. (2009). The Practice of Politics in Safavid Iran: Power, Religion and Rhetoric. I.B.Tauris. pp. 1–304. ISBN 978-0857715883.
- Sajjadi, Sadeq; Melvin-Koushki, Matthew (2008). "The Amīr Kiyāʾids of Gīlān". In Madelung, Wilferd; Daftary, Farhad (eds.). Encyclopaedia Islamica Online. Brill Online. doi:10.1163/1875-9831_isla_COM_0273. ISSN 1875-9831.
