= Kaykhosrow Khan (tofangchi-aghasi) =

Safavid military commander and gholam of Georgian descent

Tofangchi-aghasi (Commander of Musketeer corps)
- In office 1670–1674
- Monarch: Suleiman I
- Preceded by: Abbas Beg Zanganeh
- Succeeded by: Hajji 'Ali Khan Zanganeh

Personal details
- Died: 1674

Military service
- Allegiance: Safavid Iran

Kaykhosrow Khan (died 1674) was a Safavid military commander and gholam of Georgian descent. He served as the commander of the musketeer corps (tofangchi-aghasi) from 1670 to 1674, during the reign of king Suleiman I (r. 1666–1694).

Kaykhosrow's mother was a daughter of Bijan Beg, of the Georgian Saakadze family, and, thus, a nephew to Bijan's sons Rostam (the sepahsalar, d. 1643), Aliqoli (d. 1667), and Isa (d. 1654). Kaykhosrow's son, Manuchehr, briefly served as the governor of Darun in 1698–1699.

== Sources ==
- Floor, Willem (2001). Safavid Government Institutions. Costa Mesa, California: Mazda Publishers. p. 185. ISBN 978-1568591353.
- Maeda, Hirotake (2003). "On the Ethno-Social Background of Four Gholām Families from Georgia in Safavid Iran". Studia Iranica (32): 257–258, 272.

Preceded by Abbas Beg Zanganeh	Commander of the musketeer corps (tofangchi-aghasi); 1670–1674	Succeeded by Hajji Ali Khan Zanganeh
