= Rustam Khan =

Rustam Khan may refer to:

- Rostom of Kartli, a Georgian vali/king
- Rustam Khan Zand, a Zand dynasty prince.
- Rostam Khan (sepahsalar under Safi), a Safavid general of Georgian origin
- Rostam Khan (sepahsalar under Suleiman I), Safavid general of Georgian origin
- Prince Rostom of Kartli, 18th-century Georgian royal who served in the Safavid ranks
- Rostam Khan Judaki, a village in Iran
- RostamKhan, Ilam, a village in Iran
