= Rostam Khan (sepahsalar under Suleiman I) =

Safavid military commander, gholam, and official

Rostam Khan (fl. second half of the 17th century) was a Safavid military commander, gholam, and official from the Georgian Saakadze family. He served as commander-in-chief (sepahsalar-e Iran), commander of the musketeer corps (tofangchi-aghasi), chancellor/chief justice (divanbegi), and governor (beglarbeg) of the Azerbaijan Province under king (shah) Suleiman I (r. 1666-1694).

Rostam Khan was a son of Safiqoli Khan, and a namesake to his prominent grandfather, who also held the position of commander-in-chief and beglarbeg of Azerbaijan.

According to Italian traveller Gemelli Careri, when Rostam Khan's nephew Bijan Beg fell out of favor during Shaykh Ali Khan Zanganeh's vizierate, he was saved through Rostam Khan's intervention.

== Sources ==
- Floor, Willem (2001). Safavid Government Institutions. Costa Mesa, California: Mazda Publishers. p. 19-22. ISBN 978-1568591353.
- Floor, Willem M. (2008). Titles and Emoluments in Safavid Iran: A Third Manual of Safavid Administration, by Mirza Naqi Nasiri. Washington, DC: Mage Publishers. p. 156. ISBN 978-1933823232.
- Maeda, Hirotake (2003). "On the Ethno-Social Background of Four Gholām Families from Georgia in Safavid Iran". Studia Iranica (32): 1–278.
- Matthee, Rudi (2001). "GEORGIA vii. Georgians in the Safavid Administration". Encyclopaedia Iranica, Vol. X, Fasc. 5. pp. 493–496.
- Matthee, Rudi (2012). Persia in Crisis: Safavid Decline and the Fall of Isfahan. I.B.Tauris. p. 68. ISBN 978-1845117450.

Preceded by Aliqoli Khan Zanganeh	Commander-in-chief (sepahsalar-e Iran); 1692	Succeeded by Shahnavaz II, Gorgin Khan
Preceded by Hajji 'Ali Khan	Governor of Azerbaijan; 1694	Succeeded by Anusheh Khan
