= Bijan Beg (son of Rostam Khan) =

Safavid official and gholam of Georgian origin

Bijan Beg (Bezhan, Bizhan; fl. 17th-century) was a Safavid official and gholam of Georgian origin. He served as a governor (beglarbeg) of Azerbaijan during the reign of Shah Suleiman I (r. 1666–1694).

== Biography ==
A scion of the Saakadze family, Bijan was the son of the former sepahsalar (commander-in-chief), Rostam Khan (c. 1588 – 1 March 1643), and an uncle of the later sepahsalar and divanbegi (chancellor, chief justice), also named Rostam Khan. He was a namesake to his grandfather. His brother Safiqoli (d. 1679) held influential positions in the Safavid ranks as well.

Though Bijan's family had always been amongst the shah's favorites according to the Italian traveller Gemelli Careri, Bijan himself had "fallen into disgrace" during the tenure of the grand vizier Shaykh Ali Khan Zanganeh (1669–1689). Shaykh Ali Khan had made him "suspect" with Shah Suleiman I, by claiming that he was a "madman" and a "drunkard". Careri adds that it was only through the mediation of his powerful nephew Rostam Khan, that the shah could finally be convinced of his sanity.

== Sources ==
- Maeda, Hirotake (2003). "On the Ethno-Social Background of Four Gholām Families from Georgia in Safavid Iran". Studia Iranica (32): 1–278.
- Matthee, Rudi (2012). Persia in Crisis: Safavid Decline and the Fall of Isfahan. I.B.Tauris. ISBN 978-1845117450.
