= Safiqoli Khan (son of Rostam Khan) =

Safavid official and gholam of Georgian origin

Safiqoli Beg, later known as Safiqoli Khan (d. 1679), was a Safavid official and gholam of Georgian origin, who served as the governor (beglarbeg) of Mashhad from 1664 to 1666, and of the Erivan Province (also known as Chokhur-e Sa'd) from 1674 to 1679.

A scion of the Saakadze family, Safiqoli was a son of the former sepahsalar (commander-in-chief), Rostam Khan (c. 1588 – 1 March 1643) and a brother of Bijan Beg, sometime governor of the Azerbaijan Province. Safiqoli Khan also served for some time as Divan-beigi (chancellor, chief justice).

Safiqoli had a son named Rostam, another high-ranking Saakadze figure, and a namesake to Safiqoli's father.

== Sources ==
- Bournoutian, George A. (2009). A Brief History of the Aghuankʻ Region, by Esayi Hasan Jalaleantsʻ. Mazda Publishers. p. 128. ISBN 978-1568591711.
- Floor, Willem (2001). Safavid Government Institutions. Costa Mesa, California: Mazda Publishers. p. 19-22. ISBN 978-1568591353.
- Floor, Willem M. (2008). Titles and Emoluments in Safavid Iran: A Third Manual of Safavid Administration, by Mirza Naqi Nasiri. Washington, DC: Mage Publishers. pp. 172, 242. ISBN 978-1933823232.
- Maeda, Hirotake (2003). "On the Ethno-Social Background of Four Gholām Families from Georgia in Safavid Iran". Studia Iranica (32): 1–278.
- Matthee, Rudi (2001). "GEORGIA vii. Georgians in the Safavid Administration". Encyclopaedia Iranica, Vol. X, Fasc. 5. pp. 493–496.

Legal offices
Preceded by Oghurlu Beg Qajar	Divan-beigi; 1657–1663	Succeeded by Evaz Beg
Political offices
Preceded by Manuchehr Khan b. Qarachaqay Khan	Governor of Mashhad; 1664–1666	Succeeded by Haydar-Qoli Khan
Preceded by Saru Khan Beg	Governor of Erivan Province (Chokhur-e Sa'd); 1674–1679	Succeeded by Zal Khan
