= Saakadze =

Saakadze (Georgian: სააკაძე) is a Georgian surname. Notable people with the surname include:

- Tarkhan-Mouravi, a Georgian noble family
- Bijan Beg Saakadze, Georgian courtier
- Giorgi Saakadze, Georgian military commander
- Rostom Saakadze, Georgian military commander
