= Rostom of Kartli =

King of Kartli from 1633 to 1658

Rostom
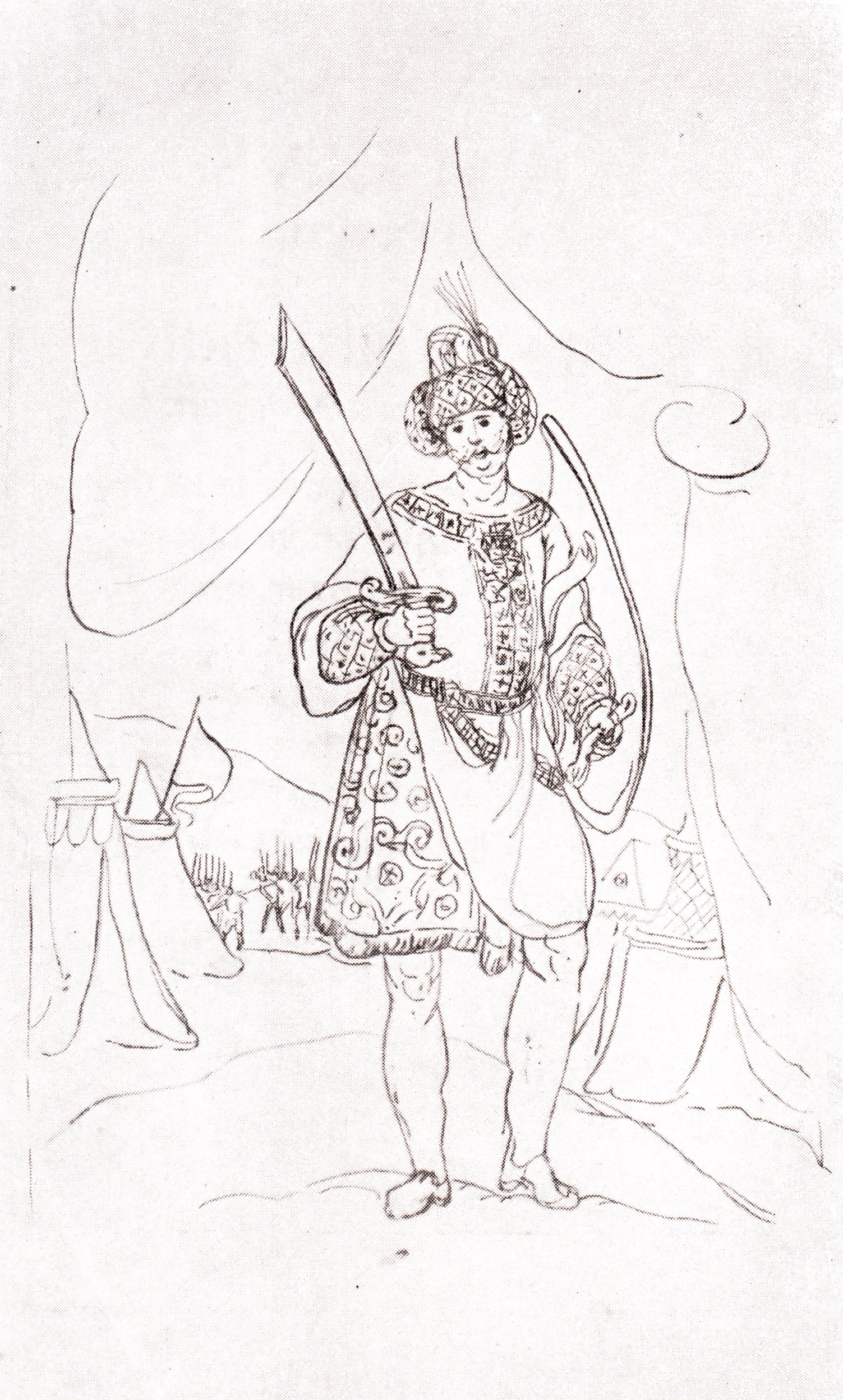
- Rostom, a sketch by the Catholic missionaire Teramo Castelli.

King of Kartli
- Reign: 1633–1658
- Predecessor: Teimuraz I
- Successor: Vakhtang V
- Born: 1565
- Died: 17 November 1658 (aged 92–93)
- Burial: Qom, Iran
- Spouse: Ketevan Abashishvili (m. 1633; died 1633) Mariam Dadiani (m. 1634)
- Issue: Prince Luarsab (adopted); Vakhtang V (adopted)
- Dynasty: Bagrationi
- Father: David XI
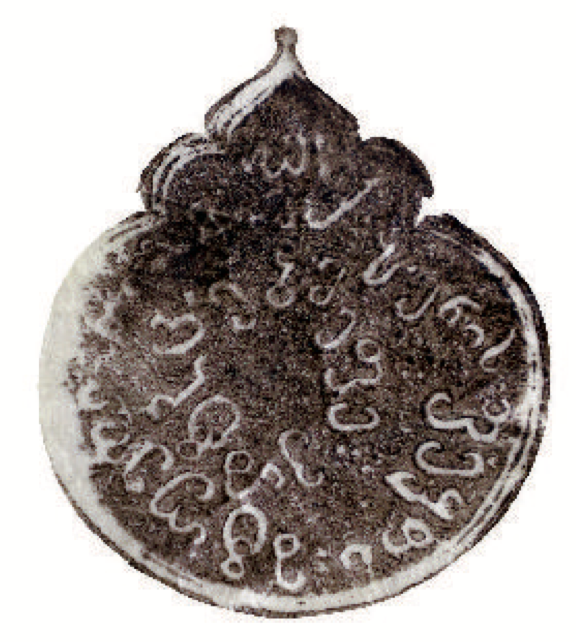
- Religion: Shia Islam Royal seal

- Khelrtva

Rostom Khan (Georgian: როსტომ ხანი; 1565 – 17 November 1658), also known as Kaikhosro (Georgian: ქაიხოსრო) or Khosro Mirza (Georgian: ხოსრო-მირზა), was a Persian and Georgian political and military figure of the 17th century. He served as darugha (prefect) of Isfahan from 1618 to 1658, Qollar-aghasi (commander of the Safavid military corps) from 1629 to 1632, and later as king (mepe) of Kartli from 1633 to 1658 and of Kakheti from 1648 to 1656.

A member of the Georgian Bagrationi dynasty, he was the illegitimate son of King David XI and spent most of his life in Safavid Persia. In Persia he lived in poverty until the Georgian general Giorgi Saakadze introduced him to Shah Abbas I. Rostom soon became an influential figure within the large Georgian community in Persia. Appointed prefect of the Safavid capital in 1618, a post he held for life, he amassed considerable wealth and became one of the shah’s closest advisers until Abbas’s death in 1629.

A capable general, he took part in Persian campaigns in Georgia (1625) and Iraq (1630). He rose to the position of commander-in-chief of the Safavid army, supported the accession of Shah Safi in 1629, and helped eliminate the powerful Undiladze family. Under the name Rostom Khan, he was appointed wali (“viceroy”) of Gurjistan in 1632 and sent with a large force to conquer Kartli, deposing the rebellious king Teimuraz I and taking his place on the Kartlian throne.

Rostom’s reign was marked by a policy of religious tolerance between his own Muslim faith and the influential Georgian Orthodox Church. Coming to power after decades of warfare, he launched an extensive reconstruction program, rebuilding Tbilisi and Gori and promoting the kingdom’s merchant class. He reorganized Georgian administration along Safavid lines and benefited from significant financial and military support from Isfahan. His pro-Persian stance, however, provoked several noble revolts and assassination attempts, including the conspiracy of 1642, which ended with the king’s victory and the execution of the Catholicos Eudemus.

In 1648, Rostom defeated Teimuraz I once again, invaded Kakheti, and annexed it to his domains. His complex diplomacy—maintaining secret contacts with Russia in the 1650s and forging an alliance with Mingrelia around 1635—allowed him to balance Islamic influence with a cultural and religious revival of Georgian Christianity. He is considered one of the most intriguing figures in Georgian history.

Rostom died in 1658 at the age of 93. He was succeeded by his adopted son Vakhtang V, founder of the Mukhranian branch of the Bagrationi dynasty.

== Early life ==
=== Childhood ===
Khosro (Kaikhosro) was born around 1565 (Note: According to Prince Vakhushti, Rostom was 67 years old when he ascended the throne—a date the prince erroneously records as 1634 instead of 1632.) in Isfahan, the imperial capital of Safavid Persia. He was the illegitimate son of David XI (Daud Khan), who governed part of the Kingdom of Kartli on behalf of Persia from 1562, (Note: Relations between Safavid Persia and the Kingdom of Kartli date back to 1516, when King David X signed a military pact with Isfahan. From then on, the Persian shahs maintained an imperialist policy towards Transcaucasia, attempting to subjugate the Georgian kingdoms, while Georgia sank into civil chaos and conflict between Christian kings opposed to Persian influence and Islamised princes. Throughout the 16th century, Kartli faced numerous Safavid invasions, and the Peace of Amasya in 1555 confirmed Persian domination over eastern Georgia.) and an unknown concubine—reportedly a peasant woman from the village of Chindisi who served at the royal court. Daud Khan secured full control of Kartli only in 1569 after defeating anti-Persian Georgian forces. Before this, he spent long periods at the court of Shah Tahmasp I, and Kaikhosro was born during one of these stays. The child was raised in the Islamic faith.

Kaikhosro spent part of his youth at his father’s court in Georgia. However, when Daud Khan defected from Persia during the Ottoman–Persian War of 1578–1590, he fled to Constantinople. In 1579, Kaikhosro and his brother Bagrat (later Bagrat VII) were seized by Persian forces and taken to the court of Mohammad Khodabanda. There, Kaikhosro received the name Khosro-Mirza and spent his remaining childhood in Persia, accompanied by his mother.

Although raised in Persia, Khosro-Mirza was regarded as a Georgian patriot. He remained fluent in Georgian and showed a strong interest in the history of his homeland.

=== Poverty and rise to influence ===
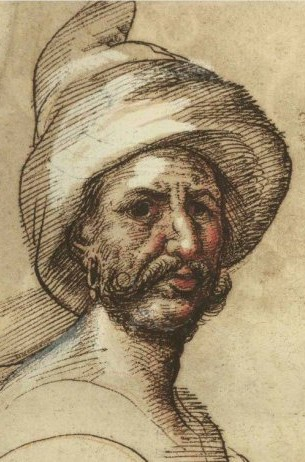
Giorgi Saakadze.

Upon his return to Persia, Khosro-Mirza fell into poverty. According to some accounts, he lived as a beggar in Isfahan and took up various small jobs to survive. This early destitution later contributed to his popularity among the peasant classes once he became king.

Khosro-Mirza’s life changed dramatically in 1612, when Giorgi Saakadze, a prominent general leading the Georgian resistance against the Ottomans, sought refuge in Persia and met the large Georgian community in Isfahan. At a banquet held in his honour, Saakadze recognized the impoverished Khosro-Mirza among the guests and invited him to sit beside him, the beginning of a close friendship between the two men. Saakadze’s influence helped raise Khosro-Mirza out of his destitution, treating him as a royal prince.

Marie-Félicité Brosset interprets this episode as an attempt by Saakadze to set up a rival to Luarsab II, effectively presenting Khosro-Mirza as a claimant to the throne. Regardless of Saakadze’s motives, Khosro-Mirza soon came to be viewed by several influential nobles of Kartli as the legitimate heir to the Georgian throne. Throughout his later life, the future King Rostom retained a deep respect for Giorgi Saakadze and his patriotism, even though the two eventually became enemies in the 1620s.

Khosro-Mirza’s new status impressed Shah Abbas I the Great, who began to take an interest in the Georgian prince. Khosro-Mirza soon moved to the imperial court, where he was instructed in palace customs by eunuchs and received honours typically reserved for members of the imperial family. Within a short time, he became the dominant figure within the large Georgian community in Persia.

=== In the Safavid Court ===
Mohebb Ali Beg, one of the most influential officials at the court of Shah Abbas I and supervisor of the imperial slaves (gholams), undertook the education of Khosro-Mirza around 1615, when the latter was already nearly fifty years old. In 1618, under the patronage of Giorgi Saakadze, he was appointed darugha (prefect) of the Safavid capital, Isfahan—a position he officially retained until his death, including during his reign as King of Kartli. This office not only increased his influence at the imperial court, especially through his closeness to the young Sam Mirza (the future Shah Safi), but also expanded his authority in Persian internal politics.

Khosro-Mirza formally held the office of darugha until 1658, though the administration of the capital was handled by vicars after his accession to the Georgian throne in the 1630s. Around 1625, while he was campaigning to suppress Georgian rebels, Mir Qassim Beg was appointed to act in his stead, consolidating Georgian influence within the Safavid state. In 1656, this vicar was dismissed by the imperial government following palace intrigues involving Vizier Mohammed Beg and factions opposed to the Georgians. Khosro-Mirza then appointed his close adviser Parsadan Gorgijanidze—himself Georgian and formerly Christian before converting at imperial request—but he too was soon removed from office. Shortly before his death, Khosro-Mirza appointed a certain Badadeh Beg, (Note: Historian Marie-Félicité Brosset identifies the name Badadeh Beg with the Georgian name Paata.) likely also of Georgian origin, as his representative in Isfahan. As king, he continued to manage affairs of the capital through his adviser Hamza Beg, a cousin of Mir Qassim Beg, who operated from the royal palace in Tbilisi.

Khosro-Mirza’s administration marked a significant shift in Safavid governance, transferring real authority from the elite Qizilbash military to the expanding class of Georgian slaves. He was greatly assisted in this process by Rostom Khan Saakadze, another Georgian statesman who became commander-in-chief of the Safavid army in 1623. Within a few years, much of the Persian judicial system came under Georgian control, a development confirmed when Rostom Khan Saakadze was appointed Divan-begi (chief imperial judge). This radical redistribution of power generated considerable resentment among both the Qizilbash military elite and the Tajik bureaucratic class, prompting Khosro-Mirza to become an active patron of public works and sponsor the construction of new bridges, roads, religious buildings, and caravanserais throughout Persia in an effort to reduce hostility.

A hostile exchange between Khosro-Mirza and Majlisi, an Isfahan imam, illustrates tensions between the local population and the new Georgian administration:

Majlisi: “When you are occupied restoring order among the troops, or when the trumpets and drums sound to announce battle, do you feel such greatness and authority that you abandon obedience to God?”
Khosro-Mirza: “It is strange that you would imagine such illusions arise at those moments, rather than when a man is praying or reciting the call to prayer.”

Despite these tensions, Khosro-Mirza operated under the strong protection of Shah Abbas, who had begun to see him as a future king of Georgia. Having become wealthy in a short period, he was granted private control of the province of Gilan, which provided him an annual income of 300 tomans until his death. Years later, after he became Rostom Khan of Kartli, Georgian diplomatic missions to Persia frequently administered Gilan—including the important city of Lahijan—on behalf of the king.

=== Campaign Against Georgia ===
Monument commemorating the Battle of Marabda.

Following the humiliating Safavid defeat on 25 March 1625 at the Battle of Martkopi and the capture of Tbilisi by the Christian king Teimuraz I of Kakheti, Khosro-Mirza became one of three generals—alongside Isa Khan Safavi and Rostom Khan Saakadze—sent by Shah Abbas I to crush the Georgian rebellion. In June 1625, a force of 60,000 Persians entered Georgia, reinforced by the governors of Shirvan and Erivan, and equipped with English artillery supplied to Persia.

While the Persians encamped at Marabda, southeast of Tbilisi and in the Algeti Valley, the Georgians under Teimuraz and his ally Giorgi Saakadze gathered in the Kojori Gorge, where the royal council failed to agree on a common strategy: Teimuraz insisted on attacking the Persians directly, whereas Saakadze preferred to hold their position and fight in terrain advantageous to the Georgians. On 30 June, Teimuraz ordered an assault. Despite the deaths of 14,000 Persians on the battlefield, the Safavid army ultimately prevailed thanks to a last-minute landing of troops from Shirvan. Khosro-Mirza commanded the right flank of the invading forces. After the Battle of Marabda, Khosro-Mirza and Isa Khan Safavi reinstated Semayun Khan (Simon II) as king in Tbilisi, though he controlled only the capital and the Armenian provinces protected by Persian forces.

In the aftermath of Marabda, rebels loyal to Giorgi Saakadze took hostage Abd-ol-Ghaffar Amilakhori, a Muslim Georgian prince supportive of Persia, along with his wife. Khosro-Mirza was tasked by Isa Khan Safavi with a rescue mission and negotiated safe passage through northern Kartli along the Aragvi River into the domains of Duke Zurab of Aragvi, guaranteeing that his troops would not ravage Georgian villages. Near the village of Tsitsamuri, north of Mtskheta, Saakadze’s rebels attacked him, but Khosro-Mirza emerged victorious from the brief and bloody encounter and established a temporary base at Mukhrani. From Mukhrani, he moved toward Dusheti, crossed Mtiuleti, and reached the mountains of Khevi, which form the natural frontier between Georgia and North Caucasus. It was at the fortress of Archi that Khosro-Mirza and his troops freed the captive couple before turning southward again.

After the Persians passed the fortress of Lomisa, Duke Jesse I of Ksani and Giorgi Sidamoni (Note: George is the brother of Duke Zurab of Aragvi.) blocked Khosro-Mirza’s route, allowing an army of 12,000 Georgians, led by Giorgi Saakadze, to launch a bloody attack (Note: The Georgian Chronicles describe the Ksani as a ‘river of blood’ following the battle.) on the Persians. During the Battle of Ksani, Banda Khan, governor of Azerbaijan, was killed, while the khan of Qazax and three Safavid generals were captured. Khosro-Mirza, however, was spared and personally protected Amilakhori. Modern historian Roin Metreveli attributes Khosro-Mirza’s survival to his earlier friendship with Saakadze, who had been his protector in Persia less than a decade earlier.

=== Kingmaker ===
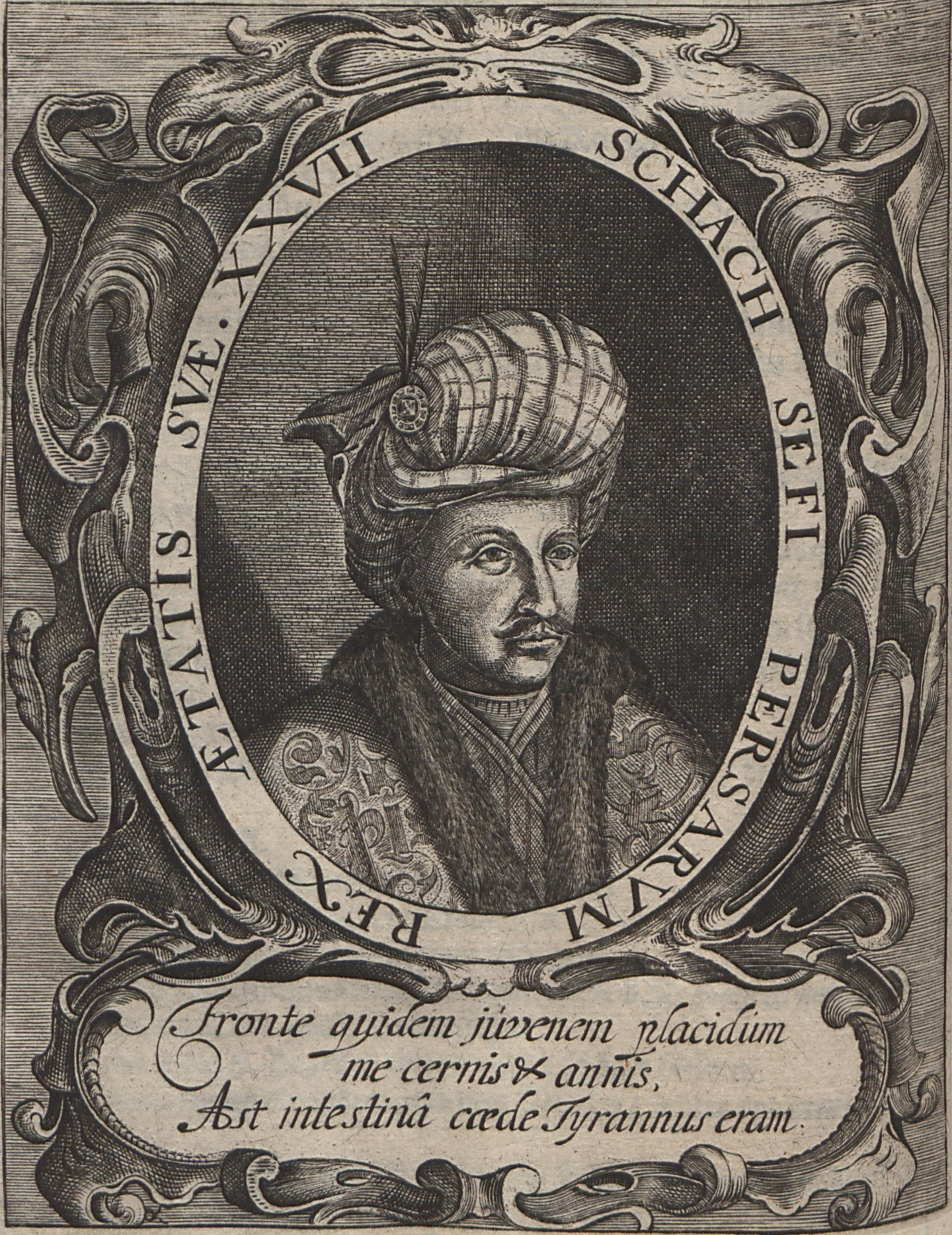
Shah Safi of Persia.

Upon his return to Persia, Khosro-Mirza witnessed the final days of Shah Abbas and, under the monarch’s direction, became the mentor of his grandson Sam Mirza. In January 1629, Abbas appointed him from his deathbed as qollar-aghasi (commander of the imperial guard) and changed his name to Rostom Khan, in reference to the hero of the Shahnameh, whose name symbolised courage and heroism. He was also granted a province and entrusted with securing the succession of Abbas in favour of his grandson.

Shah Abbas I died on 19 January 1629 in Mazandaran, from where his aunt Zeynab Begum and the local governor Zainal Khan Shamlu sent a letter to the imperial court instructing Muhibb Ali Beg to place all royal princes under surveillance and prevent any attempt at seizing the throne before their arrival. At the same time, the powerful Muslim Georgian clan of the Undiladze mobilised its forces and encouraged one of Abbas’s sons to proclaim himself shah. In Isfahan, Muhibb—who favoured patrilineal succession in accordance with Shi‘a tradition (Note: Mouhhibb Ali Bek's involvement in this struggle was only confirmed years later during his trial for corruption.)—aligned himself with Rostom and warned him of the arrival of troops from Mazandaran. Rostom accordingly ordered the gates of the capital closed, mobilised the Georgian troops, and strengthened the presence of the imperial guard around the palace and treasury.

On 28 January, Rostom proclaimed Sam Mirza shah under the name Safi I, and sent orders to all Safavid governors to come to Isfahan and swear allegiance to the new eighteen-year-old monarch. This victory strengthened the close relationship between Safi and Rostom—Safi even referred to him as his “father”. Now recognised as the “kingmaker” of the Safavid Empire, Rostom saw his influence and wealth continue to grow, and he became the principal adviser to Shah Safi, who was often more interested in courtly pleasures than in affairs of state.

As Safi ascended the throne, discussions arose at court concerning a plan to place Rostom on the Georgian throne—a proposal fiercely opposed by the Undiladze clan but seized upon by the rebel Giorgi Saakadze. Saakadze presented a peace plan between the Ottoman Empire and Safavid Persia based on unifying Georgia under Rostom Khan. The proposal, however, was rejected in Constantinople, and the Ottoman Grand Vizier Gazi Husrev Pasha used it to accuse Saakadze of betraying Ottoman interests, leading to Saakadze’s execution at Aleppo on 3 October 1629.

Safi’s reign unfolded during the Ottoman–Persian War of 1623–1639, and Rostom distinguished himself by routing the forces of Gazi Husrev Pasha at Hamadan in the summer of 1630. In November, Rostom’s troops lifted the brutal siege of Baghdad, after which they returned to Isfahan. In 1632, he consolidated his power once more by supporting Dilaram Khanum, the Georgian mother of the shah, in a series of palace intrigues that ended in a massacre within the harem, elevating Dilaram Khanum as the empire’s matriarch.

Meanwhile, tensions between Rostom and the Undiladze continued to rise. These hostilities became public during a royal banquet in which the shah expelled Daud Khan Undiladze, governor of Ganja and Karabakh, out of respect for Rostom. During the early months of Safi’s reign, the loyalty of Muslim Georgians was divided between Rostom and the Undiladze, and the shah—resentful of the clan’s vast wealth—dismissed Daud Khan from the majlis in 1630. That same year in Georgia, Teimuraz of Kakheti staged a coup in Tbilisi, enlisted Zurab of Aragvi to assassinate Semayun Khan, then executed Zurab himself and sent his head to Rostom as a token of allegiance, even as he began aligning himself with the Undiladze.

In 1632, the family of Imam Quli Khan Undiladze was executed, and the clan lost all remaining authority in Persia. Rostom Khan then persuaded the shah to entrust him with an expedition to Georgia, with the goal of making him the new King of Kartli.

=== Conquest of Kartli ===
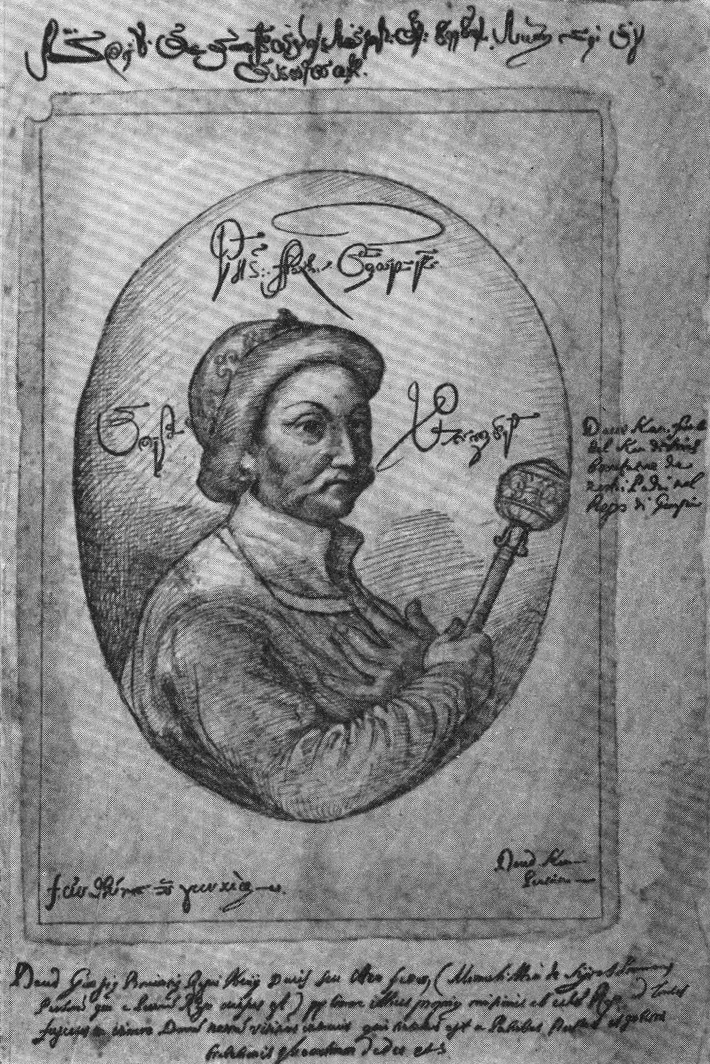
Daud Khan Undiladze.

Teimuraz of Kakheti and Daud Khan Undiladze formed an ambitious alliance against Isfahan. Together, they ravaged Barda and Karabakh, while Daud Khan swore allegiance to the Georgian king, who granted him estates along the Iori River. The aim of this 1632 uprising was to place a uncle of Safi I on the Persian throne. Safi responded immediately by sending a large army to invade eastern Georgia in 1632, led by Rostom Khan, Rostom Khan Saakadze, and Selim Khan. Before departing, Rostom Khan was proclaimed wali of Gurjistan, making him the de jure governor of Kartli.

In Barda, Teimuraz and Daud Khan awaited a force of 40,000 Armenians promised by the catholicos Moses III of Tatev, but the latter’s sudden death on 14 May brought an end to the plan of a unified Caucasian army against Persia. Fearing the Safavid invasion, Daud Khan Undiladze abandoned Teimuraz and sought refuge within the Ottoman Empire.

Rostom advanced accompanied by many influential Persian Georgians, including the nobles Roin Pavnelishvili, Turman-Beg Turmanidze, Teimuraz Chkheidze, Hassan-Beg Baratashvili, and David Tvaldamtsvrishvili, all of whom would later become officials at the royal court. Otia Andronikashvili, another ally of Rostom, was sent in the autumn of 1632 to warn the Georgian nobility of the invading army, but he was arrested and imprisoned in the royal palace of Dighomi, north of Tbilisi.

Upon reaching Khunan, on the frontier between the Caucasus and the Safavid Empire, Rostom received the allegiance of Prince Vakhtang II of Mukhrani and of the Baratashvili family. In response, Teimuraz gathered his troops at Saphurtsle, south of Tbilisi, and imprisoned the women of the Baratashvili clan, threatening them with torture before releasing them at the intercession of his wife.

After entering Karabakh, Rostom crossed the Georgian border in February 1633. Teimuraz saw his support rapidly collapse; the majority of the nobility remained neutral before the invasion, except for the steadfast anti-Persian noble Iotam Amilakhvari. The king abandoned his palace at Dighomi and fortified himself in Gori, where he demanded 13,000 piastres from the local Theatine missionaries to purchase new arms—a request the Catholics refused. Teimuraz found himself isolated: David of Aragvi deserted him, his army dwindled to only the royal guard, reinforcements from Imereti never arrived, and George III of Imereti was engaged in a violent war against Mingrelia. (Note: It was Mingrelia that formed a political alliance with Rostom shortly after he came to power.) When Rostom’s army reached Aghjakala, Teimuraz fled to Kvishkheti, at the foot of the Likhi Range, which separates Kartli from western Georgia.

On 18 February 1633, Rostom arrived in Tbilisi, took control of the Georgian government, and dispatched a cavalry force of 2,000 men to intercept Teimuraz before he could reach Imereti. Teimuraz, hesitant to seek refuge in western Georgia due to the ongoing Imeretian civil war, nevertheless managed to escape but lost part of his guard in a clash with Rostom’s cavalry near Mount Peranga.

This defeat marked the end of Teimuraz’s second reign (1625–1633) and the beginning of Rostom’s rule, which lasted until his death. The Persian general Selim Khan was granted the governorship of Kakheti.

== King of Kartli ==
=== Consolidation of Power ===
Once Rostom had been installed on the throne, Rostom Khan Saakadze returned to Persia, but instructed the khans of Qazax, Lore, and Shamshadil to maintain a military force in Georgia to support the new ruler. Rostom placed Persian garrisons in the citadels of Gori and Surami and gradually replaced these Persian troops with Shirvanian militias to avoid provoking unrest among the population; Shirvan was a South Caucasian province geographically close to Georgia. In 1633, Rostom and his allied khans launched a military expedition into Ardahan against Samtskhe as part of the Ottoman–Safavid War.

Rostom moved quickly to secure the support of the powerful Kartlian nobility, offering them numerous gifts. The nobles, exhausted by decades of conflict, sought accommodation with the new monarch, who demanded that they kiss his feet as a sign of allegiance. Immediately upon taking power, he granted the domains of Samshvilde to the great noble Chioch Khmaladze, restored the Saakadze family to its former estates in honor of Giorgi Saakadze, and married Ketevan Abachidze, daughter of Prince Gorjasp Abachidze, according to both Christian and Muslim rites. Queen Ketevan, who died in 1633, was renamed Guladukhtar by her husband.

At the same time, Rostom acted aggressively against those who continued to recognize Teimuraz as the legitimate king. (Note: Teimuraz I is considered by many supporters of Georgian unification to be the legitimate monarch of the country's three crowns, as the husband of Queen Khorasan Bagration, herself the eldest descendant of Alexander II, the last king of united Georgia.) He sent military detachments to devastate the lands of nobles who refused to appear before him, ordered the defenestration of the royal attendant Kaikhosro Baratashvili for his role in the massacre of Persians at Birtvisi in 1626, and survived multiple assassination attempts. In 1633 and 1634, he replaced dozens of lords with their sons or brothers. Furthermore, the return to Georgia of hundreds of captives taken during the early-century Persian invasions—men who had been raised at the Safavid court alongside Rostom—and their reintegration into their Christian families, enabled the formation of a genuine pro-Persian faction within the lower Georgian nobility. Although Rostom did not persecute Christians, he regarded nobles who refused to convert to Islam as disloyal and significantly increased the influence of his Muslim allies.

Inspired by the governing system of his mentor Abbas the Great, Rostom undertook the centralization of a fractured state and replaced Teimuraz’s administration with officials loyal to Persia. He appointed Qaia Tsitsishvili as sakhltukhutsessi (Grand Master of the Palace) in 1635, and Manuchar Sumbatashvili as governor of Tbilisi on 8 April 1634. Rostom’s extensive centralizing reforms initiated the rise of absolute monarchy in Georgia—a process later continued by Heraclius I, Vakhtang VI, and Heraclius II—and marked a break with the medieval order in which the high nobility dominated domestic politics.

In 1636, King Rostom took under his protection the young Parsadan Gorgijanidze, the ten-year-old son of the governor of Gori. Parsadan would later become one of the most prominent Georgian writers of the 17th century and the official biographer of both Rostom and his successor Vakhtang V.

=== Safavid Influence ===
At the age of 67 when he ascended the throne, Rostom was already an experienced statesman, described by his biographer as “full of worldly dexterity, wealthy and esteemed”. Despite his Georgian origin, he had been educated within Muslim and Safavid administrative traditions, which made him something of a foreigner in his own country and led him to pursue reforms aimed at harmonizing the governance of Tbilisi with that of Isfahan. Accordingly, he appointed both Persian officials—including his vizier Muin Mohammad—and Georgian ones. Rostom’s most significant reform was the renaming of royal governmental offices: without altering their functions, he replaced their traditional Georgian titles with their Safavid counterparts.

Positions within the government of Rostom
Georgian position	Persian name introduced by Rostom	Function
Msakhurtukhutsesi	Qurchi-bashi	In charge of the palace and army finances; head of the royal administration.
Monatukhutsesi	Qollar-aghasi	Chief of the royal guard.
Mandaturtukhutsesi	Echikaghasi-bashi	Supervisor of protocol affairs.
Ezosmodzghvare	Nazir	Minister of the court.
Mestumretukhutsesi	Mehmandar	Responsible for royal receptions.
Khurotmodzghvare	Sardar	Commander-in-chief of the royal forces.

Although these changes were mostly superficial and designed to satisfy Persia, they remained in place until the Russian annexation of Georgia in 1801 and helped the Georgian nobility adapt relatively easily to new administrative customs. Rostom was the first Georgian king to diminish the authority of the darbazi, the royal council composed of noble and ecclesiastical dignitaries since the 13th century. He also appointed an mdivan-begi (Note: The word mdivani (მდივანი), which comes from Persia, now means “secretary” in Georgian.) as judge, a role previously exercised by the council. Under his rule, the darbazi served only to negotiate marriage alliances among the nobility, leading to the decline of this old institution and its complete dissolution a century later under Heraclius II.

Rostom is also remembered for introducing Persian customs and courtly practices into Georgian society. The Georgian Chronicles claim that he brought “the luxury and feasting of the Persians, debauchery, shamelessness, deceit, the love of pleasures, of bathing, of improper adornment, and performers of lute and flute; indeed, only those who adopted these habits were esteemed, and even the heads of the clergy degraded themselves by taking part”. He is often described as a lover of festivities and entertainment, a passion financed by generous subsidies from Isfahan, which covered his palace expenses throughout his reign. His close relationship with the shah’s court made Rostom one of the wealthiest men in the Safavid Empire, controlling rich domains including eastern Georgia, Isfahan, Quba in Shirvan, the Province of Zanjan, and Gilan, as well as holding suzerainty over 500 clans of Turkmen nomads.

However, Persian influence also brought unprecedented control over Kartli’s internal affairs. Not only were Muslim troops stationed in the fortresses of Tbilisi, Gori and Surami, but Persian military governors administered the southern territories, particularly Lore and Gagui. In Tbilisi, a vizier, a mostoufi, and a munshi oversaw palace affairs on behalf of Persia, controlling the kingdom’s revenue services and military administration. Every official appointment required confirmation from Isfahan. Rostom was also obliged to pay an annual tribute in slaves, often the children of minor nobles.

In Kartli, Rostom styled himself in documents as “King of Kings,” continuing the titulature of his Christian predecessors. His subjects recognized him as mep’e (მეფე, “monarch”)[1], and he was even crowned in a Christian ceremony in 1634 at the Anchiskhati Basilica in Tbilisi. However, his Persian overlords designated him “wali of Gurjistan,” the title of vali symbolizing the union between Iran and Georgia. Rostom was ranked by Isfahan as one of the four walis of the Safavid Empire, along with those of Arabistan, Luristan, and Kurdistan—governors more autonomous and powerful than emirs and khans. Although Rostom was considered the third most powerful governor in the empire, after the walis of Luristan and Arabistan, Gurjistan (Kartli) was never formally declared Persian territory.

Despite the significant reduction of Kartli’s independence, the kingdom retained a considerable degree of autonomy, preserving its culture, Orthodox religion, land rights, and its own socio-economic policies. The enduring strength of the Georgian nobility throughout the 17th century stands in contrast to the khanates of the Transcaucasus, whose administrations were entirely replaced by officials from Isfahan. This complex and unique relationship between Tbilisi and Isfahan formed the basis of a union that lasted more than a century, until 1744. From 1632 to 1744, every king of Kartli was Muslim and appointed by the shah. In 1800, when King George XII of Kartli-Kakheti attempted to negotiate a union between the Russian Empire and eastern Georgia, he described—unsuccessfully—the political system established by Rostom. Some historians, however, such as Nikoloz Berdzenishvili (1973), accuse Rostom of having ended Kartli’s independence and fully incorporating it as a Persian province.

=== Alliance with Mingrelia ===
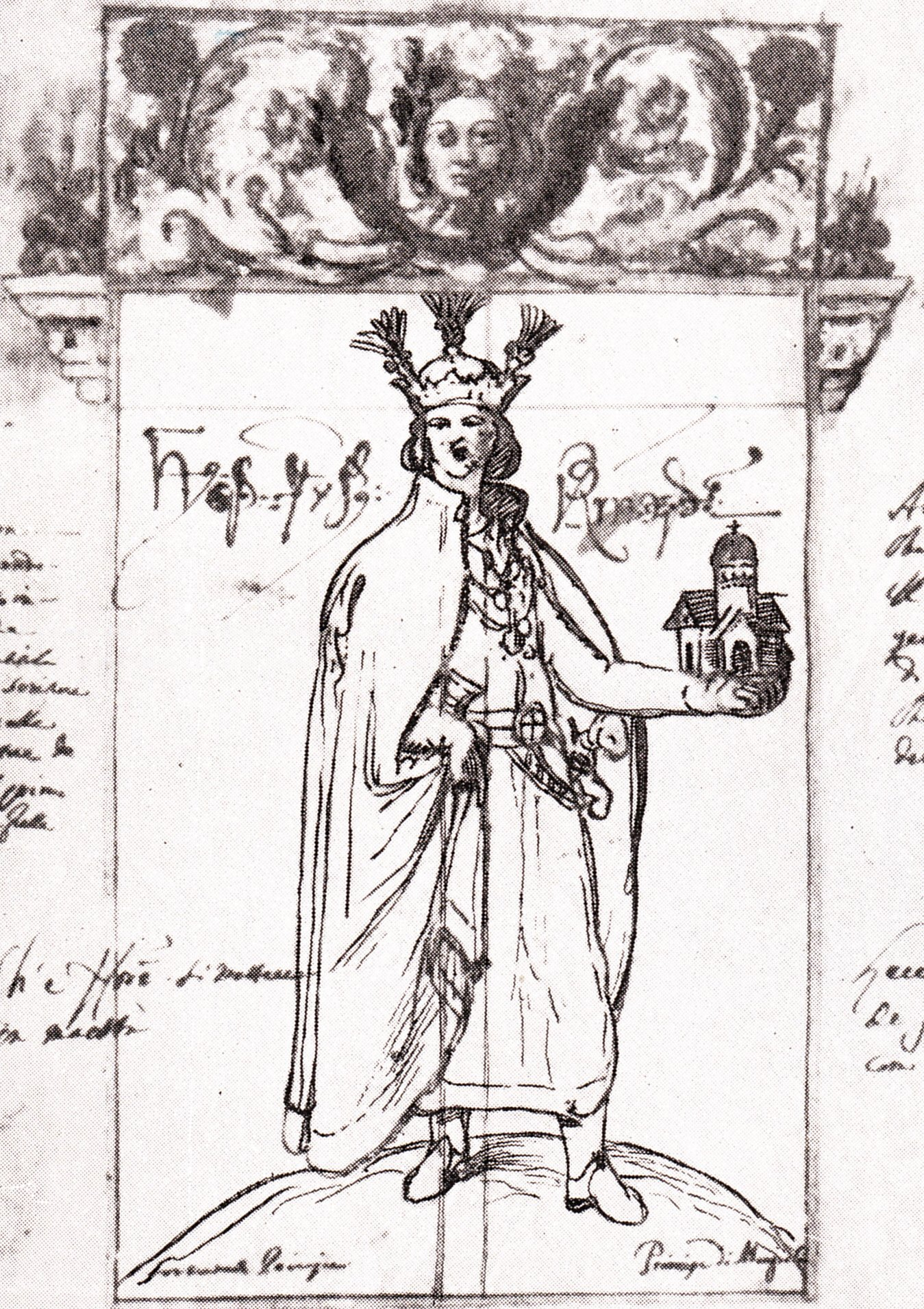
Levan II Dadiani of Mingrelia.

Queen Ketevan Abashidze died in 1633, the same year as her marriage. In search of a new wife, Rostom turned to western Georgia, where a prolonged conflict had been raging since 1623: the Kingdom of Imereti, the refuge of Teimuraz, and the principality of Guria were engaged in a long war against Mingrelia, ruled by Levan II Dadiani. The situation west of the Likhi Range was closely tied to the stability of Kartli since the “Agreement of the Six Georgias” of 1615, initiated by Teimuraz and binding the rulers of Kakheti, Kartli, Imereti, Mingrelia, Guria, and Samtskhe to work together toward national reunification. Moreover, George III of Imereti and Kaikhosro of Guria openly supported an invasion of Kartli to reinstall Teimuraz on the throne. In 1633, Rostom decided to form an alliance with Levan II Dadiani, thus ending the 1615 Agreement, isolating Teimuraz, and positioning himself as a new candidate for a united Georgian crown.

Rostom sent a diplomatic mission to Mingrelia to negotiate his marriage with Mariam Dadiani, the prince’s sister and recently divorced from the deposed prince Simon II Gurieli. The delegation was led by the bishop of Tbilisi and, curiously, included Nicephorus Irbachi, the former foreign minister of Teimuraz, who would once again join Teimuraz in 1636. The exact date of the alliance remains debated: historians place the marriage between 1633 and 1638. The Georgian Chronicles, written less than a century after Rostom’s death, place it in 1638, though this is unlikely since Nicephorus Irbachi was in Russia from 1636 to 1639. Several of Rostom’s royal charters suggest a date of 1636, a theory supported by a church inscription in Khoni describing Levan Dadiani’s journey to Kartli to meet his brother-in-law in that year. The historian Iskandar Beg Munshi mentions a proposed marriage alliance between Kartli and Mingrelia in 1633, attributing its delay to constant fighting between the Imeretians and Mingrelians. Historian Nodar Asatiani dates the marriage to 1634, while Avtandil Tsotskolaouri places it in 1633.

Mariam Dadiani was renowned for her Christian piety and hesitated to marry a Muslim monarch; Rostom was obliged to arrange her baptism to convince her. Levan Dadiani and Rostom Khan nonetheless reached an agreement and decided to meet at Kakaskhidi, a village in Imereti but under Mingrelian control. Unable to use the traditional roads from Surami to Imereti due to a blockade by George III of Imereti, Rostom crossed Mount Persati with permission from the Ottoman pasha Yusuf of Childir, while Levan Dadiani crossed the Samikelao region and the Rioni River. Along the way, George III—encouraged by Teimuraz—attempted to prevent the marriage and attacked Prince Dadiani, who nonetheless defeated him and held him captive for the next two years. At Kakaskhidi, the two rulers celebrated their new kinship with great ceremony and agreed to cooperate in a major invasion of Imereti.

==== International Importance of the Alliance ====
Map of the Principality of Mingrelia.

This alliance held significant geopolitical importance not only for Rostom but also for Persia, which was still at war with the Ottoman Empire at the time. Rostom Khan therefore sought permission from Shah Safi before marrying Mariam Dadiani, and Isfahan appointed Parou Khan, the beylerbey of Shirvan, to supervise the alliance. Mingrelia, located on the shores of the Black Sea, lay within the traditional sphere of influence of Constantinople, and the marriage ensured that Levan Dadiani accepted Persian suzerainty. As early as 1635, he refused to supply troops to the Ottoman army for its planned invasion of Armenia. To celebrate the alliance, Isfahan bestowed numerous gifts upon the prince of Mingrelia, including a donation of 50,000 martchilis (one and a half tons of silver) and an annual pension of 1,000 tumans. Ultimately, the union was used by Persia to block a potential Russian intervention in western Georgia.

The wedding took place in Tbilisi, with Mariam Dadiani accompanied by leading religious and noble figures from Mingrelia and Guria. Their delegation spent six months celebrating across Kartli before returning west, while the newly married royal couple toured the kingdom after their nuptials, visiting Gori, Tskhireti, and Somkhiti. Mariam quickly became an influential figure in the kingdom’s internal politics, promoting the protection of Christianity. Her extensive estates in Armenia, along with her private palaces in Tsintsqaro, Bolnisi, Ophreti, Gomareti, Ourtsevani, Nakhiduri, Akhaldaba, Ali, Tskhinvali, Aradeti, Ruisi, Gori, and Ateni, served as intellectual salons encouraging Christian education in a kingdom that was increasingly Muslim.

Following the marriage, the Ottomans grew concerned about Rostom’s rising power, and rumors in Constantinople predicted that Rostom and Levan Dadiani were preparing 30,000 soldiers to invade Ottoman-held territories on the Black Sea. However, the Treaty of Zuhab in 1639 brought peace between the Ottomans and the Safavids, and the Likhi Range once again became the boundary between the two empires.

=== Reconstruction ===
After decades of warfare, Kartli was devastated and its economy had collapsed. When Rostom invaded the kingdom in 1632–1633, he found a country in which the former urban centers of Tbilisi and Gori had been reduced to small towns, and the multitude of villages that once formed the basis of Georgia’s agricultural prosperity had been turned into fortified settlements. Free from the constant Persian incursions that had troubled his predecessors, the new king launched an ambitious program to rebuild eastern Georgia.

In Gori, he transformed the citadel into a royal palace in just twenty days, adding new ramparts and a Persian-style garden. The complex became the residence of representatives of the Isfahan court during his absence. Near Gori, he enlarged the small borough of Akhalkalaki on the Tedzma River into a major village and a commercial hub linking western Georgia with eastern Transcaucasia. (Note: In 2020, the Georgian government announced the reconstruction of Akhalkalaki, now nicknamed the ‘City of Rostom’. Not to be confused with the city of Akhalkalaki in the south of the country.)

Rostom’s most significant projects were undertaken in the royal capital, Tbilisi. He abandoned the royal domains of Isani and Dighomi and commissioned a large palace on the banks of the Mtkvari, in the very center of the city, between the churches of Anchiskhati and Sioni. The Isani fortress was granted to Persian soldiers. (Note: This palace was destroyed during the Battle of Krtsanisi in 1795. One facade still stands today.) He restored the Narikala citadel overlooking Tbilisi and built a rampart extending from the Mtkvari to the fortress hill, thereby protecting the city’s expanded population. Rostom also constructed the Metekhi Bridge, which still links Avlabari and the Old Town, and rebuilt the surrounding districts. Drawing inspiration from Isfahan, he ordered the construction of public baths near his residence.

Although a Muslim, Rostom gained renown for restoring two of the principal cathedrals of the Georgian Orthodox Church: the Alaverdi Monastery in Kakheti, rebuilt in 1653 in honor of nobles who had died during his reign, and the Svetitskhoveli Cathedral at Mtskheta, the spiritual center of Georgia, whose dome collapsed in 1656, An inscription on the cathedral’s western wall commemorates Rostom as a Muslim king.

To stimulate commerce, Rostom rebuilt the kingdom’s logistical infrastructure. He constructed numerous caravanserais and bazaars in and around Tbilisi, as well as roads connecting the capital to the Caucasus highlands. Large bridges intended to facilitate caravan traffic were erected throughout eastern Georgia, particularly around Ganja. The Red Bridge, now located on the border between Georgia and Azerbaijan, also dates from his reign.

Rostom was the first king since the end of the Middle Ages to build regional residences, thereby encouraging the growth of new villages. One of his most frequently used retreats was the royal palace at Kojori in the Kiketi valley, which replaced an older medieval citadel.

=== Return of Teimuraz ===
In 1635, Duke David of Aragvi rebelled against Tbilisi and declared his support for the restoration of Teimuraz. Rostom assembled his forces and positioned himself at Mukhrani, demanding that the duke either submit or go into exile in Persia. Before resorting to ravaging David’s domains, however, Rostom chose to negotiate. While the two men were dining together at Mukhrani, an emissary of Teimuraz arrived at the royal camp with a message for the Duke of Aragvi. When the royal guard blocked the messenger from delivering his letter, David realized he was effectively being held hostage and drew his sword. Rostom then ordered his execution by firearm, carried out by his advisers Gabashvili and Turkistanishvili. David's severed head was sent to the shah, while the Aragvi nobility proclaimed David's younger brother, Zaal Sidamoni, as the new duke.

Zaal continued his brother’s revolt but was unable to resist the advance of Rostom’s army, which devastated the villages of Dusheti, Bazaleti, and Sachubaro for eight days. Zaal was soon joined by Iotam Amilakhvari, Prince of Samilakharo; Parsadan Tsitsishvili, Count of Satsitsiano; and Duke Jesse of Ksani, who killed his own brother, Shanshe Kvenipneveli, fearing that his kinship with the king would endanger him. (Note: Shanshe Kvenipneveli was then married to Rostom's grandniece.) With this new support, Zaal recaptured Dusheti and fortified it, while Rostom’s vanguard was ambushed and massacred in a nearby forest, forcing the king to retreat to Saburdiano. Victorious, Zaal turned against the Duchy of Ksani and invaded Jesse’s lands, driving the duke to seek refuge in Imereti. Rostom then summoned the great nobles of Kartli to organize a large-scale invasion of Aragvi, even dispatching envoys to the exiled Jesse.

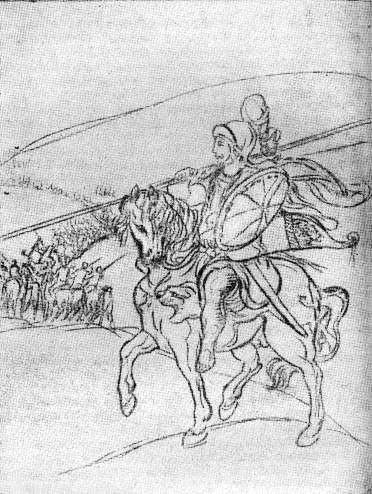
Teimuraz on the battlefield.

Meanwhile, Teimuraz seized on the chaos in Kartli to return to eastern Georgia. When Rostom learned that the deposed king had already reached Kakheti (Note: Teimuraz returned to Kakheti via Transcaucasia.) and had met with Iotam Amilakhvari and Prince Vakhtang II of Mukhrani—despite the latter being one of Rostom’s allies—he rushed back to Tbilisi and appealed to Persia for assistance. The shah, however, was unable to send troops due to the Ottoman siege of Erivan in 1634–1635. Later in 1635, Teimuraz, armed by Zaal, invaded Kartli and laid siege to Gori, but he was quickly defeated by the local governor. The following day, Rostom, joined by Armenian meliks and the Baratashvili family, fortified himself in the Gori citadel, which Teimuraz attacked again—this time reinforced by the Prince of Mukhrani. The second siege was particularly bloody, but Rostom ultimately prevailed, forcing Teimuraz to retreat to Kakheti while he himself ravaged Mukhrani.

On 8 August 1635, Erivan fell to the Ottomans. Despite this defeat, Shah Safi ordered the Azerbaijani troops to support Rostom. With a large army at his back, Rostom invaded Kakheti just as Teimuraz deposed the governor Selim Khan, and fortified himself at Ananuri. When Teimuraz requested negotiations, Rostom agreed and, rather than impose a decisive defeat, allowed him to continue ruling Kakheti, officially out of respect for their shared Bagrationi dynasty. This decision is now regarded as a strategic victory for Tbilisi: on one hand, Isfahan was compelled to accept the new reality and recognize Teimuraz’s rule to prevent him from allying with the Ottomans; on the other, Rostom preferred his Christian cousin on the throne of Kakheti to the prospect of a Safavid khanate emerging on the borders of the Georgian capital.

Teimuraz thus regained the crown of Kakheti and swore allegiance to the Safavid Empire, making Rostom his official suzerain. Toward the end of 1635, he sent his daughter Tinatin to Persia to marry the shah, and Rostom had her escorted by his ambassador Agha Muin.

=== The 1635 Plot ===
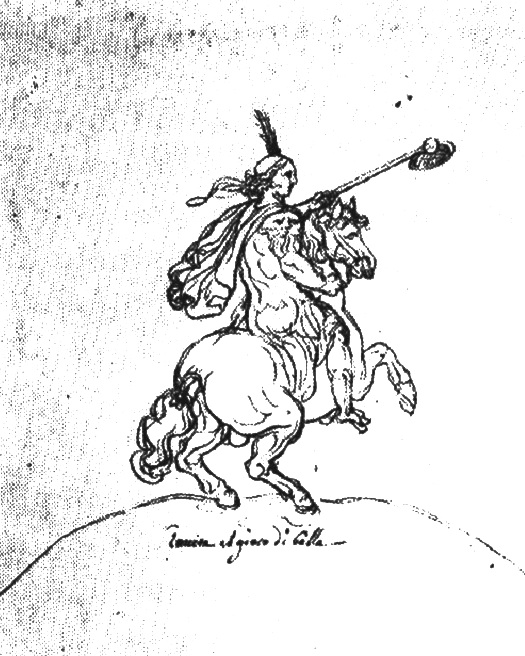
Prince Mamuka of Imereti. A drawing from the travel album of Teramo Castelli.

In 1635, the seventy-year-old Rostom, still without an heir, faced growing concern among the Kartlian nobility, who feared either a renewed period of instability or outright annexation by Persia. The darbazi therefore recommended that the king adopt Prince Mamuka of Imereti as his son and designated successor. Mamuka was widely seen as an ideal candidate: the younger brother of King Alexander III of Imereti, a talented general in the Imeretian army, a potential son-in-law of Levan II of Mingrelia, a Christian, and unconnected to Safavid influence. Because of his dynastic ties, Mamuka represented for many Georgians a hope for national reunification. His possible adoption by Rostom was interpreted by some as an attempt to negotiate peace in western Georgia and to forge an alliance between Imereti and Kartli.

Mamuka was in Akhaltsikhe on a diplomatic mission to the Ottomans on behalf of his brother when he was invited to Tbilisi by the royal court. Rostom and Mamuka celebrated what appeared to be the beginning of an agreement. During the night, however, agents attempted to assassinate the king, stabbing the royal groom instead. Once the plot was discovered, the assailants fled the palace, leapt into the Mtkvari River, and vanished. The affair was kept secret, and Rostom refused to investigate further, unwilling to jeopardize the budding alliance with Mamuka. The groom, meanwhile, was banished from court after being accused of attempting to assault a young boy.

Twenty days after the assassination attempt, Rostom agreed to attribute the blame to Mamuka. Rather than arrest him, he offered him 10,000 marchilis and sent a letter to his residence at Somaneti, stating:

“I fear that the shah may summon you to his court; you have my word that no violence will be permitted against you, yet you know as well that we cannot refuse the shah. Go therefore to Akhaltsikhe; whatever can be done for you here, I shall do.”

Mamuka fled to Akhaltsikhe and then returned to Imereti, bringing an end to the reunification project. One interpretation of the episode argues that the assassination attempt was orchestrated by Persia, angered by the selection of Mamuka as Rostom’s heir; others attribute the plot to Teimuraz. Members of Mamuka’s retinue—among them the princely Chkheidze family—remained in Kartli and allied themselves with Nodar Tsitsishvili, a powerful count who continued to oppose Persian influence.

=== Peace and Turmoil ===
Rostom's decree settling a conflict among the nobility.

Relations between Rostom and Teimuraz were complex. Officially, peace prevailed between Kartli and Kakheti, which allowed Rostom to reach agreements with Zaal of Aragvi, Jesse II of Ksani, and Iotam Amilakhvari. In practice, however, Teimuraz continued to pursue his ambition of unifying eastern Georgia and, together with Zaal and Count Nodar Tsitsishvili, repeatedly attempted to assassinate or overthrow Rostom between 1636 and 1642, including an attempt in a public bathhouse. In 1636, Teimuraz sent an embassy to Russia seeking military assistance from Tsar Michael I for an invasion of Kartli, and he even declared himself a Russian vassal in 1639. Moscow, however, never provided any support. That same year, the Treaty of Zuhab ended the Ottoman–Safavid War, dashing Teimuraz’s hopes for Ottoman intervention, while Imereti remained too preoccupied with its conflict against Mingrelia to intervene.

The cold war between Rostom and his rival persisted for several years, while Rostom used this period of relative peace to consolidate his authority. When Iotam Amilakhvari and Nodar Tsitsishvili clashed in 1636–1637 over control of Karaleti, the king intervened, disarmed both nobles, and granted the district to Tsitsishvili. When Amilakhvari, joined by his ally Jesse II of Ksani, rebelled and aligned himself with Teimuraz, Rostom imprisoned their wives in Gori until Iotam’s return. After Jesse II fled to Persia, Rostom’s agents assassinated him, and the duchy of Ksani was granted to Shanshe I, bringing stability to the region.

In circumstances that remain unclear—possibly connected to the broader Ottoman–Safavid conflict—Rostom launched a military expedition in 1638 into Samtskhe, then under Turkish control, and returned to Tbilisi with spoils amounting to 2,000 tumans.

=== Total War ===
==== Revolt of Nodar Tsitsishvili ====
In late 1639, a conspiracy led by Zaal of Aragvi, Iotam Amilakhvari, Nodar Tsitsishvili, the royal prince George Gochashvili, (Note: The Gochachvili family is a younger branch of the Bagrationi dynasty of Kartli.) and Catholicos Eudemus aimed to depose Rostom and place Teimuraz on the throne of Tbilisi. The plot escalated into a full civil war when Tsitsishvili became the first to openly rebel against the crown. He quickly secured the support of numerous minor nobles and compelled his vassals to join him after seizing the village of Khovleti, a stronghold of the pro-Rostom faction within his domains. Tsitsishvili then fortified himself in the citadel of Doesi, northwest of the capital, awaiting military reinforcements together with Otia and Bejia Chkheidze.

Upon learning of the revolt, Rostom appointed Ioram Saakadze as commander of his army and ordered all roads leading to Doesi to be closed. A general conscription was instituted in the capital, and the king instructed the mouravi of Tbilisi to execute anyone refusing to answer the call to arms. That evening, the royal army assembled at the entrance of Mtskheta, and at midnight Saakadze met the king at the village of Kavtiskhevi with reinforcements arriving from the provinces, not far from Doesi. During the night, Rostom recaptured Khovleti but refused to launch a surprise attack on Doesi, declaring:

"Kartlians measure themselves against one another to prove the righteousness of their actions. I too fight my vassal for the sake of my rightful claims, and if my claims are false, then may victory be his."

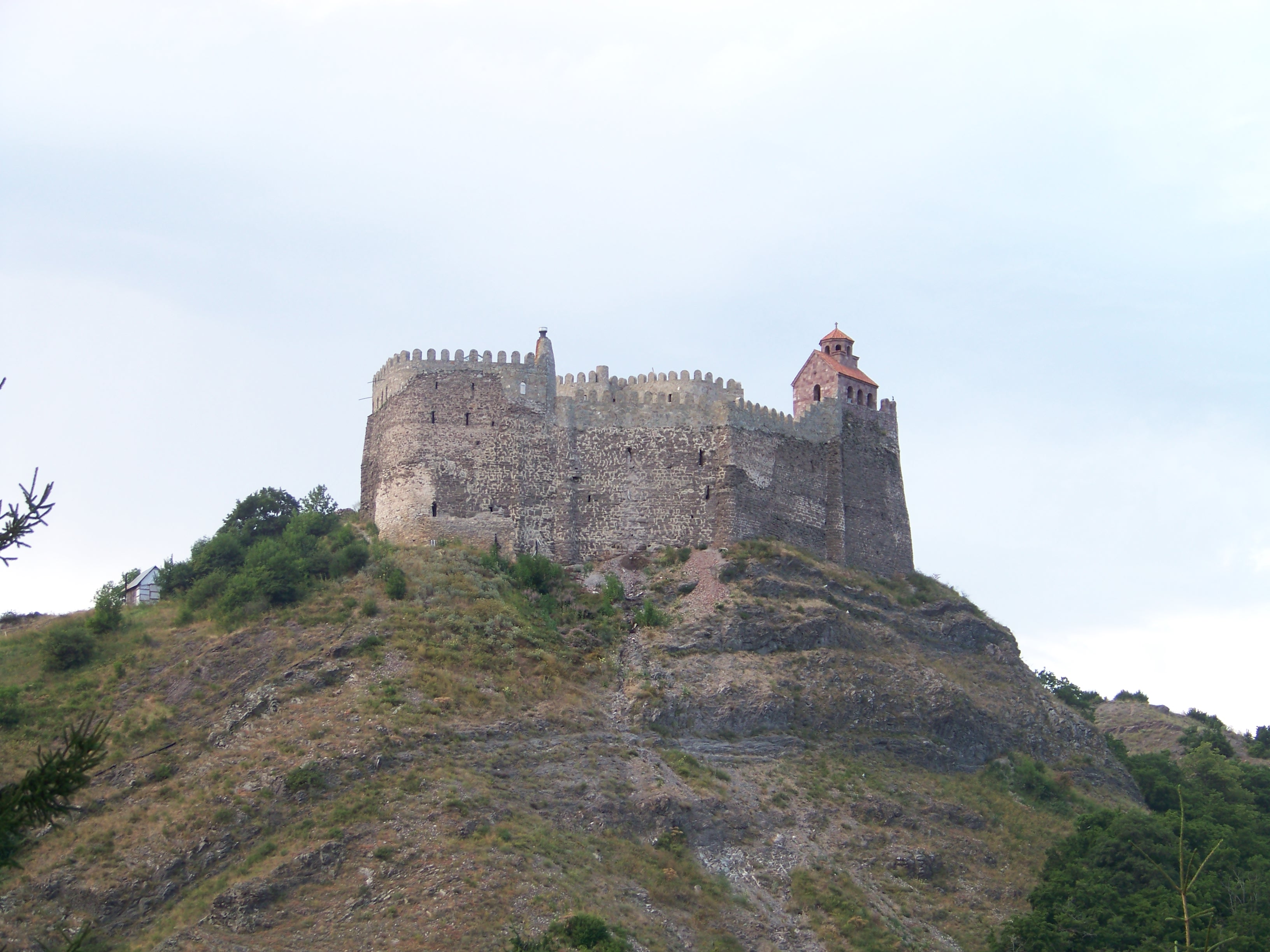
Mdzovreti fortress.

The next morning, Rostom besieged Doesi, but Nodar Tsitsishvili managed to escape and entrenched himself in the fortress of Vere. Doesi, defended by the Imeretian contingent of the Chkheidze brothers, fell after a bloody battle during which the brothers were captured by Saakadze and sent to Persia. Rostom pardoned his prisoners and advanced on Vere, though Tsitsishvili again fled. The fortress was completely destroyed, and the king captured the rebel count’s wife and children before establishing his base at Tskhireti. Returning the next day to Gori, Rostom turned against other nobles: Kaikhosro Baratashvili, a courtier of Queen Mariam, was assassinated and his sons imprisoned at Gori; George Gochachvili was exiled to Kakheti; and Iotam Amilakhvari, fearing Rostom’s army, sought refuge in Imereti. Meanwhile, Tsitsishvili fortified himself at Mdzovreti as Rostom ravaged his domains, the Satsitsiano. Rostom then laid siege to Mdzovreti, but after a week without success, on 6 January 1640, Tsitsishvili’s mother secured from the king a safe passage for her son to Akhaltsikhe in Ottoman territory. (Note: A Georgian custom requires an attacker to accept the demands made by the mother or wife of a besieged person.)

Although the revolt of Nodar Tsitsishvili in 1639–1640 failed, Rostom—distracted by the siege of Mdzovreti—did not anticipate Teimuraz’s invasion, encouraged by Catholicos Eudemus. On 6 January 1640, Teimuraz reached Mukhrani, forcing Rostom to return to Gori to prepare his defense. When a Persian force arrived to support him, Teimuraz withdrew to Kakheti, losing many troops to Vakhtang II of Mukhran along the way.

==== Teimuraz at the Gates of Tbilisi ====
The failure of Teimuraz’s January 1640 invasion did not bring an end to the rebellion. On 24 December, Iotam Amilakhvari and Zaal of Aragvi concentrated their forces at Akhalgori, preparing an attack on Mtskheta, while Teimuraz himself waited with his guard at Sapurtsle. Rostom ordered a conscription in Tbilisi and arrived at Mukhrani on the evening of 24 December, joining his troops with those of Vakhtang II of Mukhran. On the morning of 25 December, during the Christmas liturgy, Rostom and Vakhtang launched an attack on Akhalgori, forcing Amilakhvari and Zaal to flee. On 26 December, Rostom released his prisoners and returned to Gori, where he spent the winter.

In 1642, a major conspiracy was formed to proclaim George Gochachvili a usurper, assassinate Rostom, and restore Teimuraz. The plot involved Zaal of Aragvi, Catholicos Eudemus, Prince Revaz Baratashvili, and Korkhmaz Beg, melik of Armenia. Alexander III of Imereti and Kaikhosro I Gurieli also supported the conspirators. Soon after, Teimuraz entered Kartli, passed through Kaspi, and reached the outskirts of the Metekhi district of Tbilisi, waiting for Rostom—who was spending the winter at the village of Tskhireti—to be assassinated, while Gochachvili marched toward Gori. At the last moment, Korkhmaz Beg betrayed the conspiracy and warned the king, allowing Rostom to leave the capital and barricade himself in Gori. Teimuraz was forced to withdraw to Kakheti.

Rostom punished the conspirators of 1642 harshly. Gochachvili was blinded; Prince Jean Saakadze fled to Kakheti with Revaz Baratashvili; his brother Zurab was imprisoned; and the abbot of Largvisi, son of Zaal, was also jailed. Catholicos Eudemus was initially sentenced to imprisonment but was defenestrated by his Muslim guard, effectively ending the independence of the Georgian Orthodox Church. Rostom appointed Christophe Ordubegashvili as his successor. The king ravaged the domains of Iotam Amilakhvari, burned the fortress of Tskhvilo, and ended his campaign only after receiving the rebel’s submission. Others were blinded or executed, and the king confiscated the lands of numerous minor nobles. The new Persian shah, Abbas II, congratulated Rostom by sending him a crown, a ceremonial cap, a sabre of gold, an imperial khalat, and a horse.

Toward the end of 1642, Abbas II sent a large army to assist Rostom. It consisted of troops from Azerbaijan, Shirvan, Karabakh, and Erevan, and was commanded by Emir Adam Andronikashvili, Rostom’s nephew. The king and Andronikashvili advanced together into Kakheti but suffered a defeat at the Battle of Magharo in 1643. The setback did not significantly weaken Rostom, and when the Persians threatened to devastate Kakheti, Teimuraz sued for peace. In the west, Rostom crossed the Likhi Range and annexed the frontier marches of Imereti as punishment for Alexander III’s involvement in the plot.

The arrival of Adam Andronikashvili and the failure of the 1642 conspiracy not only strengthened Rostom but also confirmed that the accession of a new shah in Isfahan posed no threat to Rostom’s favorable standing with the Safavid government. After Teimuraz’s defeat in 1643, Ana Khanum Tsitsishvili, daughter of Nodar and wife of Zaal of Aragvi, implored the king to pardon her family. Nodar Tsitsishvili returned from Akhaltsikhe and was restored to his domains after prostrating himself before the king. As for Zaal of Aragvi, he was sent to Isfahan to swear allegiance to the shah, who granted him not only royal pardon but also several villages in Persia.

==== Conquest of Kakheti ====
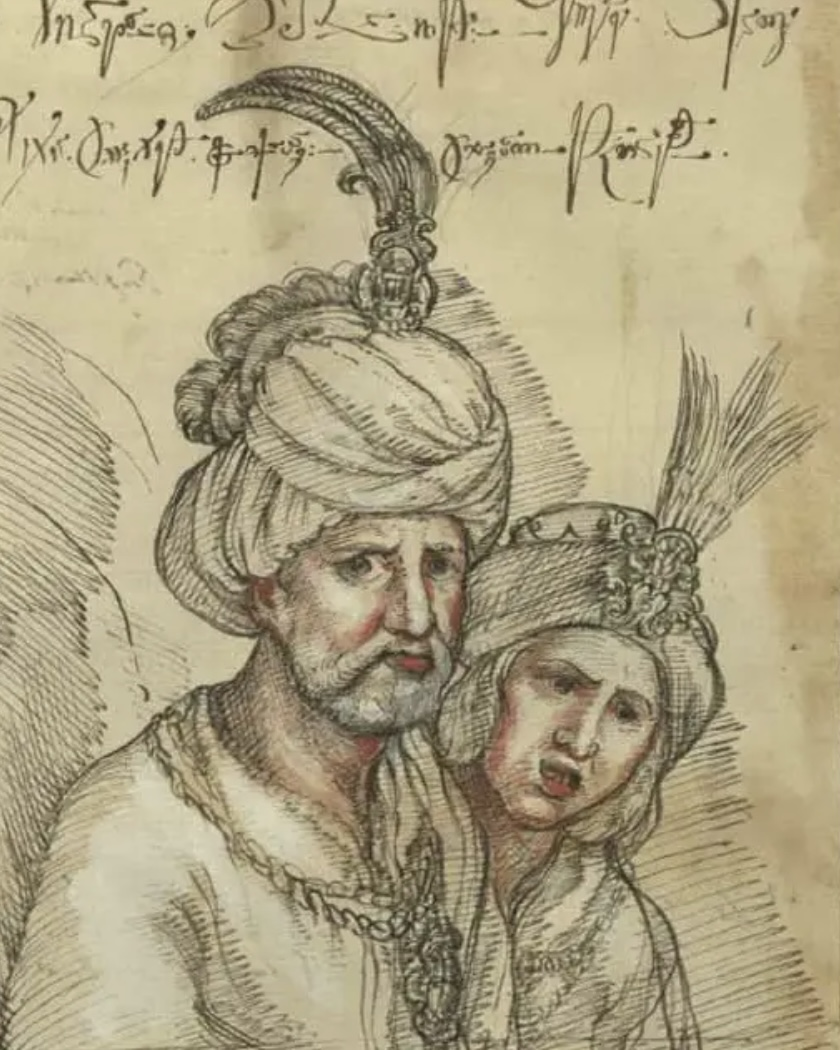
Teimuraz I and his wife Khoreshan.

The victory of 1643 allowed Rostom to put an end to the revolts of the high nobility of Kartli. Zaal of Aragvi, Iotam Amilakhvari, Nodar Tsitsishvili, and Revaz Baratashvili were all pardoned and allied themselves with the king, increasingly isolating Teimuraz. When Zaal returned to Georgia in 1645, Teimuraz confiscated his Kakhetian domains. Rather than attack his neighbor, Rostom seized the lands of Roin Javakhishvili, had him blinded, and granted his principality to Zaal as compensation. At the same time, Isfahan appointed Adam Andronikashvili governor of Kakheti in 1644, dividing the kingdom. However, diplomatic intervention from Russia prevented Persia from authorizing a full-scale invasion of Kakheti.

By 1647, the Safavid government and Rostom had resolved to eliminate Teimuraz. A judge appointed by Andronikashvili charged Teimuraz with the murder of Semayun Khan, Rostom’s nephew, committed in 1630. Both kings agreed to negotiate through a panel of sixteen mediators—two nobles and two clerics each from Imereti, Mingrelia, Guria, and Akhaltsikhe. They secured a two-year peace agreement and transferred the villages of Gavazi and Kisikhevi to Rostom. After a year of rising tensions, Teimuraz reclaimed the two villages in 1648, giving Rostom the pretext he had been awaiting to invade Kakheti.

In Kartli, Rostom—despite being Muslim—prayed in the Svetitskhoveli Cathedral before launching the invasion and gathered his troops alongside those of Vakhtang of Mukhran and Zaal of Aragvi. In Kakheti, Teimuraz prepared his defenses by assembling his army at Tianeti, but divisions within his court prevented him from unifying his forces, and part of the Kakhetian army remained in the province of Ertso. Prince David, Teimuraz’s last surviving son, defended the southern region of the kingdom. The Kartlian army invaded Kakheti on two fronts: Vakhtang and Zaal advanced on Tianeti, while Rostom and his Persian contingent moved toward David’s position. During the Battle of Ughlisi, Vakhtang of Mukhran killed Revaz Cholokashvili, Teimuraz’s prime minister, causing the Kakhetians to disperse and securing a decisive victory for Kartli. The severed heads of the Kakhetian dead were displayed in the Sioni Cathedral of Tbilisi by royal decree. Meanwhile, Rostom confronted David at the Battle of Magharo and decimated the Kakhetian forces, killing David himself. David’s head was later presented to Shah Abbas II.

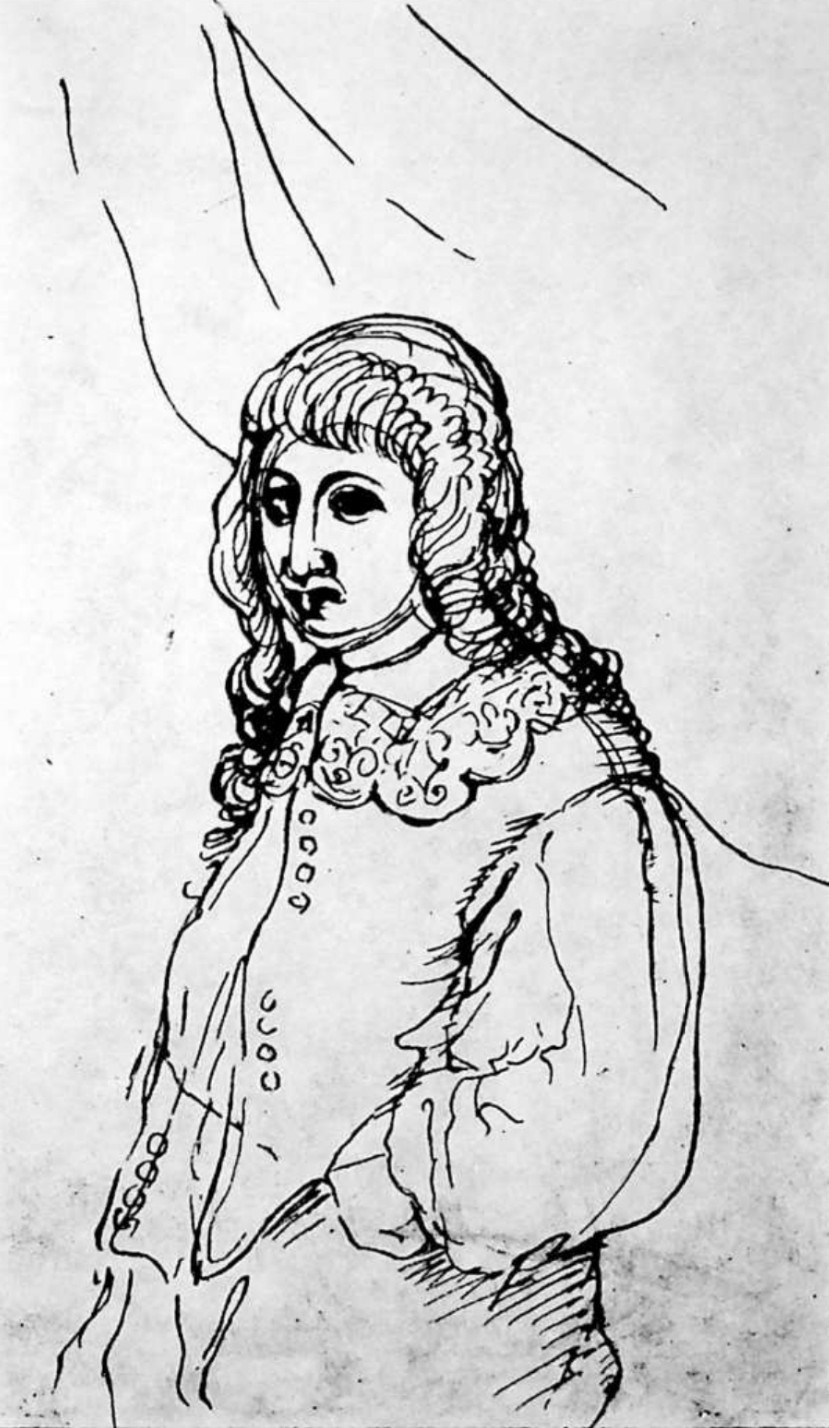
Prince David of Kakheti, killed during the Battle of Magharo.

The two victories at Ughlisi and Magharo marked Rostom’s final triumph over his longtime rival. Rostom then besieged Teimuraz’s residence in Inner Kakheti. Facing imminent defeat, the Kakhetian nobility pledged allegiance to the king of Kartli and even offered to surrender Teimuraz, while Isa Khan Borchaly, khan of Lore, urged his execution. However, when Queen Khoresan of Kakheti met Rostom to plead for mercy and request permission for the royal family to retire to the Alaverdi Monastery, the king sent their appeal to Isfahan for approval. Before receiving an answer, Rostom granted Teimuraz, Khorasan, and their retinue safe passage to Imereti, under the protection of Catholicos Christophe and with 500 horses and mules and 500 tomans.

Modern historians do not interpret Rostom’s sparing of his rival after sixteen years of war as an act of chivalry but rather as a strategic calculation. According to Nodar Asatiani and Avtandil Tsotskolauri, Teimuraz’s continued existence served as the primary safeguard of Rostom’s autonomy, and the king feared that without his rival, eastern Georgia might be directly annexed by Isfahan. Only in Imereti did Teimuraz learn of David’s death and enter mourning, but he failed to persuade Alexander III to launch an invasion of Kartli, as the latter feared Levan II Dadiani. In 1653, Teimuraz sent an embassy to Russia seeking military intervention against Rostom, but Tsar Alexis I refused due to the ongoing Russo-Polish War of 1654–1667.

Rostom’s conquest of Kakheti granted him the title of “King of Kings of Kartli and Kakheti”, uniting the two Georgian kingdoms within a union recognized by the shah, who presented him with a new crown, a jewel-studded sword, a cravat, a khalat, and a horse with a gold harness. Rostom awarded Zaal of Aragvi the provinces of Ertso, Tianeti, and Kherki, making him de facto governor of Kakheti—a decision welcomed by the local nobility. After 1648, Rostom spared the minor nobility of Kakheti and confirmed, by royal decrees, the fiefs of many former allies of Teimuraz, including Paata Lomkatsichvili, lord of Antoki.

=== Diplomacy ===
Rostom Khan.

Throughout his reign, Rostom served as a loyal vassal of Persia, paying an annual tribute and regularly sending Georgian troops to support the shah’s numerous military campaigns. In 1648 and 1651, for example, a Georgian contingent led by Zaal of Aragvi took part in the Persian invasion of Kabarda. The Treaty of Zuhab in 1639 confirmed Persian supremacy over Kartli and hindered any plans for a reunification of Georgia. Nevertheless, because Rostom had formerly been a protector of Shah Safi I, he enjoyed considerable autonomy in internal affairs. Persia’s war against the Mughal Empire in 1648–1653 further increased Rostom’s independence.

After the 1639 treaty, Rostom cultivated close relations with the Ottoman pashas of Akhaltsikhe, establishing a general peace between Tbilisi and the Ottomans. This policy also ensured that the Ottomans would not support Teimuraz during the war of 1648. Rostom’s flexible diplomacy protected Kartli in a difficult geopolitical context marked by the Ottoman–Persian War of 1623–1639, the Russo-Persian War of 1651–1653, and growing Ottoman–Russian tensions in the 1640s–1650s.

In 1640, Russia placed Mingrelia and Imereti under its official protection but hesitated to do the same with Kartli, fearing that conflict with Persia would jeopardize the trade route through Dagestan. However, Rostom appears to have sent his own envoy—one Mehmed Khan Beg—to Russia in 1652. Although largely ignored by contemporary Georgian sources, the mission is described in detail in Russian documents from the court of Tsar Alexis I. The delegation reached Terek in July 1652, Astrakhan on 21 August, Saratov on 3 December, and arrived in Moscow on 30 January 1653. Papuna, an agent of the deposed Teimuraz, attempted several times to block Mehmed Khan Beg’s progress, but without success. The mission’s purpose remains unclear but is generally interpreted as a direct opening toward Moscow—either to negotiate commercial spheres of influence in the North Caucasus or to counter Teimuraz’s influence at the Russian court. Another theory sees the envoy as part of Persian diplomacy during the war of 1651–1653: a Persian embassy had been expelled from Astrakhan in 1650, and Rostom, as a Georgian ruler, may have acted as an intermediary. Historian Roin Metreveli argues that the mission was not only known to Persia but organized with the support of Isfahan.

In 1652, the Russian envoy Arseny Sukhanov, returning from the Middle East, passed through Tbilisi. There he attended a banquet hosted by Catholicos Christopher and the Archbishop of Tbilisi, both close allies of Rostom. According to Sukhanov’s account, the catholicos instructed him to inform the tsar that Rostom was prepared to accept Russian suzerainty. The clerics outlined a proposed campaign in which Rostom would supply 24,000 troops from Kartli and 12,000 from Kakheti to open a route for the Russian army through Dagestan, after which Russia would invade Kakheti and then Kartli. The next day, Rostom met Sukhanov personally, discussed the mission of Mehmed Khan Beg, and provided him with an escort to Terek. On his return journey, Sukhanov was interrogated in Ganja and Shamakhi by Persian agents about his meeting with Rostom. Only through Rostom’s intervention was he able to travel safely back to Russia via Shamakhi.

On 13 August 1653, Ivan Danilov, a Russian icon painter working at Queen Mariam’s court, sent a message—via the Armenian merchant Chechu—to Nikolai Tolotchanov, the Russian ambassador in Imereti. Danilov reported possessing state secrets about Rostom and described what he claimed was an anti-Russian plot by Teimuraz in Imereti. In fact, Danilov was acting on Rostom’s instructions and served as a secret channel between the royal court and the Russian embassy in Kutaisi. These communications portray Rostom as quietly seeking contact with Moscow without provoking his Safavid overlords.

Russia never responded to Rostom’s overtures, but Teimuraz’s ties with Moscow weakened significantly after the king’s diplomatic maneuvers. It is unlikely that Rostom, after decades of loyal service to Persia, intended to betray his suzerain in favor of a Christian empire. Modern historians generally view his initiatives not as hostile to Persia but as a calculated strategy carried out with the approval of Shah Abbas II. Indeed, the main result of these efforts was the collapse of the alliance between Teimuraz and Russia: an embassy from the mountain tribes of Kakheti requesting Teimuraz’s restoration was rejected, and Teimuraz’s visit to Moscow in 1658 achieved nothing.

The extent of Rostom’s influence in Russia remains unclear. Historian David Marshall Lang mentions the presence of a Georgian royal spy at the court of Tsar Alexis, and diplomatic correspondence from the 1650s refers to an espionage network created by Rostom that operated throughout the Russian Caucasus.

=== Final Years ===
==== Succession Problems ====
Rostom’s lack of an heir created persistent uncertainty in Tbilisi, where the Georgian nobility feared a return to chaos after the death of the aging king. In 1639, Rostom selected Prince Luarsab Bagrationi, a grandson of Simon I then living in Isfahan, and submitted a formal request to the shah’s court to adopt him. Early in 1641, Persia approved the request, and Luarsab was officially recognized as heir to the Kartli throne. He married Tamar Andronikashvili, daughter of Emir Adam, in 1649, and increasingly took on ceremonial and political duties, accompanying the king on regional visits. However, the Georgian nobility struggled to accept yet another Muslim prince raised in Isfahan as their future ruler. Some nobles also feared that once enthroned, the young Luarsab might centralize royal authority even further than Rostom. A faction eventually formed a conspiracy against him.

In 1652, during a hunt in the forest of Karaia, Luarsab was struck in the neck by a bullet fired from the gun of Lord Baindur Tumanishvili. Rostom, then travelling in northern Persia, returned immediately to Georgia and found his adoptive son on his deathbed. Their final exchange was recorded by Parsadan Gorgijanidze:

Rostom: “Who was standing on the side from which the shot came? Do you know who fired it?”
Luarsab: “If I recover, I will find the man who struck me; if I die, be at peace and do what you find fitting.”

Luarsab died around midnight in the king’s arms, and his body was brought back to Tbilisi in a procession led by Rostom. A period of national mourning was declared, and the royal couple kept vigil over Luarsab’s body in his Avlabari residence until the funeral. He was ultimately buried in Ardabil with Islamic rites.

In Tbilisi, the noble Shiosh Baratashvili publicly accused Tumanishvili of murder and demanded a trial by duel. At court, the duel was seen as a confrontation between the royal faction, supporting Baratashvili, and Tbilisi’s influential Armenian community, supporting Tumanishvili. Rumors spread that Persian officials in the capital also backed Tumanishvili. The duel took place before the royal palace, and Tumanishvili prevailed.

In Persia, Luarsab’s death alarmed the Safavid court, which feared the implications of a Christian nobility capable of killing the heir to the throne without legal consequences. A diplomatic crisis followed, culminating when the Kartlian embassy to Shah Abbas II warned of a popular uprising should Isfahan investigate Luarsab’s death.

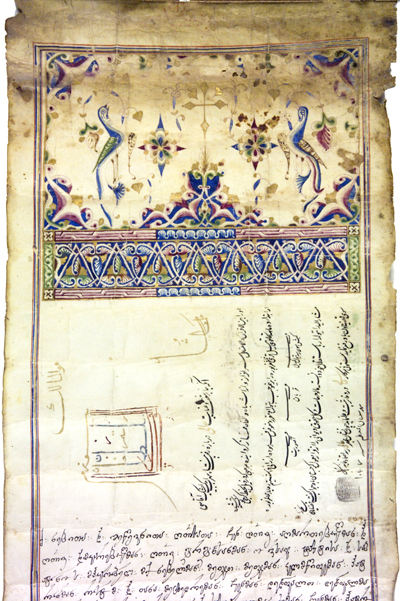
Decree of Rostom dating from 1657.

After Luarsab’s death, Rostom considered adopting Prince Vakhtang Bagrationi, Luarsab’s brother, governor of Qazvin, and Persia’s preferred candidate. The Georgian ambassador Turman requested permission from the shah for a new adoption, and in Tbilisi, Tamar Andronikashvili—Luarsab’s widow—was viewed as Vakhtang’s likely future wife. However, Vakhtang’s mother refused the adoption, fearing he might meet the same fate as his brother. Early in 1653, Vakhtang died of illness, possibly poisoned by Rostom’s agents.

Ultimately, in 1653, Rostom selected Prince Vakhtang II of Mukhrani as his heir. A Muslim raised in Georgia and closely connected to Kartli’s Christian community, Vakhtang was quickly accepted by Persia, which granted him the title Shah Navaz Khan during a visit to Isfahan. Upon his return to Georgia, Rostom granted him estates in Savakhtaago and appointed him administrator of the kingdom. By then 88 years old, Rostom entrusted the daily governance of Kartli to his new heir.

To strengthen his position, Vakhtang arranged the marriage of his son Archil to the daughter of Nodar Tsitsishvili, and the marriage of his own daughter to Zurab Sidamoni, son of Zaal of Aragvi.

=== Upheaval in Mingrelia ===
Throughout the reign of Rostom, western Georgia was engulfed in continuous conflict between King Alexander III of Imereti and Levan II of Mingrelia, who enjoyed direct support from Kartli. In February 1646, Levan II captured Prince Mamuka of Imereti, Alexander III’s younger brother, who in 1635 had been considered a potential heir to Rostom. At Alexander’s request, Rostom attempted to negotiate Mamuka’s release, but in 1651 the prince was blinded. Levan Dadiani refused to free him, provoking Rostom’s displeasure. When the Mingrelian ruler requested the appointment of Parsadan Gorgijanidze as vizier in 1653, Rostom declined. In 1654, Mamuka died after years of mistreatment, and Rostom—supported by Queen Mariam, Levan’s own sister—publicly cursed Levan II. Military aid from Tbilisi was subsequently cut off.

When Levan II died in 1657, he was succeeded on the Mingrelian throne by his nephew, Liparit III Dadiani. Rostom restored the military alliance and dispatched forces from Satsitsiano, Saavalishvilo, and Sabaratiano to support Liparit III. In June 1658, at the Battle of Bandza, Kartlian troops were defeated by Alexander III, forcing Rostom to ransom his captured soldiers with gold.

Following the defeat at Bandza, Rostom sent Vakhtang of Mukhrani and Zaal of Aragvi against Imereti, but disagreements between the two princes ended the campaign prematurely. The thirty-year conflict in western Georgia ultimately concluded with an Imeretian victory, securing the kingdom’s dominance over the region.

=== End of Reign ===
In 1653, Rostom fell gravely ill, and the royal court prepared for his death, as reflected in the embassy of Zaal of Aragvi to the shah. Although the king survived the year, he began to arrange the succession. In 1656, he appointed Givi Amilakhvari, son of Iotam, as commander of the Kartlian armed forces and elevated his family to the most powerful in eastern Georgia, granting the Amilakhvari the right to collect taxes throughout the kingdom. That same year, Persia once again named Selim Khan as governor of Kakheti, and Rostom guaranteed a division of authority in the province between him and Zaal of Aragvi.

When Prince Nicholas Bagrationi, grandson of Teimuraz, travelled to Russia in 1651–1652, his entourage was attacked and massacred in Circassia by agents of Rostom.

In 1657, the anti-Georgian faction in Isfahan exploited the king’s weakened state to attempt an invasion of Kartli. Mohammad Beg, qollar-aghasi of the Persian army, and the governor of Azerbaijan spread rumors of Rostom’s death and of an alleged Georgian rebellion against Persia; they amassed troops along the Georgian frontier. Only through the intervention of a special envoy of the shah did Isfahan learn the truth and force Mohammad Beg to withdraw.

On 17 November 1658, Rostom Khan died at the age of 91 in the royal palace of Tbilisi. In the capital, a succession struggle began between Vakhtang and Zaal, while Persian officials quickly secured the royal treasury under the supervision of Queen Mariam. Rostom was buried in the Persian religious center of Qom, not far from the tomb of Shah Abbas the Great.

== Family ==
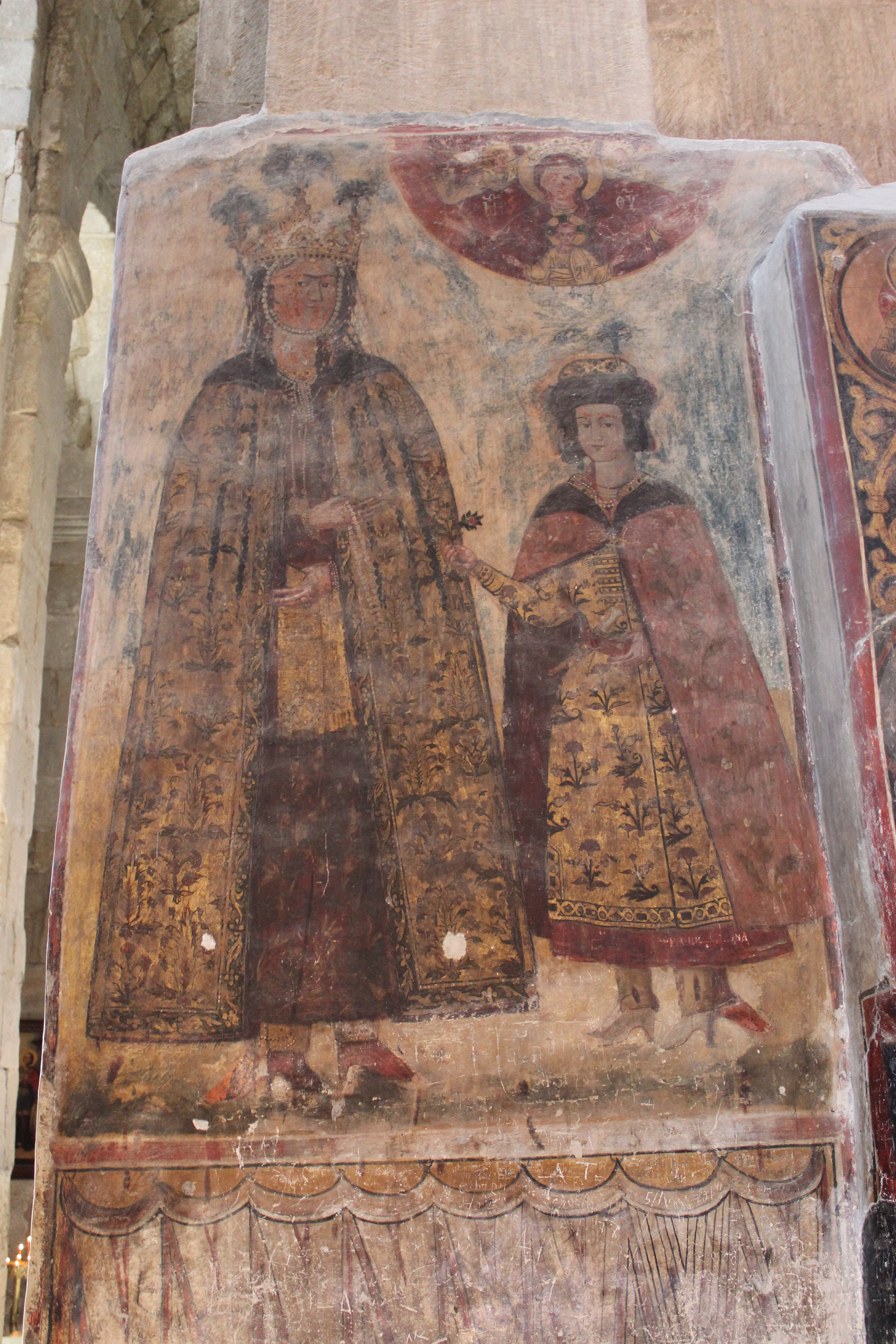
Queen Mariam and her son Otia Gurieli.

Rostom married Ketevan Abashishvili in 1633, the daughter of Prince Gorjasp Abashishvili. The Georgian Chronicles identify Gorjasp as a member of the Abashidze family, but this claim has been rejected by Cyril Toumanoff. Ketevan died later in 1633, and between 1633 and 1635 Rostom married Mariam Dadiani, sister of Prince Levan II of Mingrelia and divorced wife of Simon II Gurieli.

Rostom had no known biological children, but in 1641 he adopted Prince Luarsab (d. 1652), followed in 1653 by Vakhtang of Mukhrani, who later founded the royal Bagrationi-Mukhrani dynasty. He also raised as his own son the young Otia Gurieli, a child from Mariam Dadiani’s first marriage. Brought up at the royal court, Otia was betrothed to the daughter of Zaal of Aragvi, but he died on 25 January 1645, prompting a twelve-day period of national mourning.

== Culture: Between Islam and Christianity ==
Rostom’s reign is a rare example of peaceful coexistence between a Muslim government and a largely Christian population in the 17th century. Although the king was a Shi‘a Muslim who consistently adhered to Islamic principles, the people of Kartli were predominantly Christian and dependent on the Georgian Orthodox Church. Rostom therefore had to receive the Church’s blessing before marrying his Christian queen, Mariam, and he signed his royal decrees invoking both Allah and Jesus Christ. Under his rule, Christians were not persecuted, but Muslims gained significant influence; historian Nikoloz Berdzenishvili notes, for example, that Church leaders required approval from Isfahan. In Tbilisi, polygamy became accepted, Persian music replaced local folklore, Muslim literature was widely promoted, and residents were required to wear Islamic clothing. Despite strong Persian efforts, no mosque or madrasa was built in the capital, though Rostom funded the construction of Islamic religious sites in the southern parts of the kingdom.

Although recognized as a wali of Persia, Rostom did not oppose the Georgian national movement; instead, he viewed nationalism as a safeguard for his autonomy within the shah’s dominion. Queen Mariam became a leading patron of Georgian culture and the Orthodox faith, earning from her contemporaries the epithet “a second Tamar,” in reference to Queen Tamar of Georgia, who ruled during the medieval Georgian Golden Age in the 13th century. Under her influence, Rostom’s government rebuilt the monasteries of Jvari, David Gareja, Alaverdi, Martkopi, Samtavro, and Bodbe, as well as the Metekhi Church and the cathedrals of Sioni, Urbnisi, and Tsilkani. Orthodox institutions grew into educational centers, where the Bible and hagiographies were studied and copied. The Sadedophalo (the queen’s apanage) became a major financial source for the Orthodox Church. Modern historiography therefore regards the 1630s–1660s as a revival period for Orthodox culture in Georgia, despite Persian domination. Rostom’s biographer likewise reports a large mass held by Rostom and Mariam in 1653 to commemorate nobles killed during the 1648 invasion of Kakheti.

The reconstruction of Svetitskhoveli Cathedral after the collapse of its dome in 1653 coincided with the restoration of the major churches’ traditional fiscal privileges, including the right to levy taxes in surrounding villages. The royal family also repeatedly granted tax rights over specific families to the seats of the catholicosate, as shown by Rostom’s 1645 “offering” of the noble Rusishvili family of Ruisi. After the execution of Catholicos Eudemus in 1642, Rostom appointed Christophore Ordubeguidze-Amilakhvari—a technocrat within the Church—only after an election and extensive consultations with religious leaders. In 1652, Christophore described Rostom’s tolerance toward Orthodox Christians during his meeting with the Russian envoy Arseni Sukhanov. When Pasha Rostom Jaqeli of Childir began persecuting Samtskhe’s Christians after coming to power in 1648, many fled to Kartli with their treasures.

This blending of Islamic and Christian customs was also evident following the deaths of Princes Otia (1645) and Luarsab (1652). After Otia’s death, his possessions were sent to the Monastery of the Cross in Jerusalem, and the village of Darbazi (in present-day Armenia) was granted to Svetitskhoveli Cathedral. The young prince was buried in a ceremony organized by the catholicos, while Queen Mariam, in mourning, was transported from Mtskheta to Tbilisi in a coffin according to Persian custom. When Luarsab, Rostom’s heir, died in a possible hunting accident, churches throughout the kingdom held masses; the mullahs of Tbilisi recited the takbir continuously for 24 hours; and Persian soldiers declared an official mourning period. A royal decree issued during the mourning instructed each religious community to pray for Luarsab according to its own beliefs.

When Rostom came to power in 1633, the Catholic Theatine Order was conducting a major mission in Gori. Pietro Avitabile, head of the mission since 1628[188], described Rostom in his letters to Pope Urban VIII as a tolerant ruler who showed no hostility toward Catholics and even attended a Catholic mass in Gori shortly after his accession. Nevertheless, the growing political dominance of Muslims alarmed the Theatines, and during negotiations between Rostom and Mingrelia preceding his marriage to Mariam Dadiani, the Catholics left Gori and founded new missions in western Georgia, considered safer for Catholic activity. Still, relations between Rostom and the Order continued: during his reign, 27 young Georgians were sent to Rome to study under a program established by the Holy See.

Since much of Armenia lay within the Kingdom of Kartli, Rostom also maintained close ties with the Armenian Apostolic Church. He granted the village of Nakhiduri, in Georgian Armenia, to the Holy See of Etchmiadzin and built the Khojivank Pantheon of Tbilisi in honor of his treasurer, Aslan Melik-Bebut. Years after Rostom’s death, in 1667, the Armenian catholicos Jacob IV of Julfa described the late king as one of the greatest benefactors of the Armenian Church.

Despite the influence of Christian and Muslim conservatives in Tbilisi, Rostom’s reign also saw the emergence of the Kinto community, a group of homosexual performers and merchants who likely operated under royal protection.

== Economy under Rostom ==
Rostom inherited an economy devastated by decades of war, disorder, and invasions, during which Kartli’s agricultural base collapsed and arable land was overtaken by forest. The relative peace of his reign allowed for extensive economic reforms and reconstruction aimed at restoring Kartli to its ante bellum condition. Rostom built numerous bridges and roads to link the capital with the provinces, as well as caravanserais and bazaars to encourage the arrival of foreign merchants. Drawing on his position as darugha of Isfahan, he promoted flourishing trade between Tbilisi and Persia, and in 1639 introduced a major reform to combat customs corruption and abolish taxes on Georgian merchants. He also rebuilt many towns that had been destroyed or depopulated during earlier turmoil, notably Gori, which he treated as a second capital.

Under Rostom, agriculture recovered its former strength, and the economy developed a growing artisan and commercial sector. With the return of stability, many families who had taken refuge in rural areas moved back to the towns, and the population of Tbilisi rose to about 20,000 by the end of Rostom’s reign. In northern Kartli, Ossetian tribes used the new stability to establish settlements. The prosperity of this period marked the beginning of a long phase of economic revival in eastern Georgia that lasted until the 1720s, contrasting sharply with the economic collapse unfolding in western Georgia. This prosperity, however, was limited to Kartli: Kakheti continued to suffer from destructive wars until 1648, followed by incursions from Dagestani tribes that ravaged the region despite Rostom’s diplomatic efforts. Hunting became a popular leisure activity not only for the royal family but also for the lower nobility.

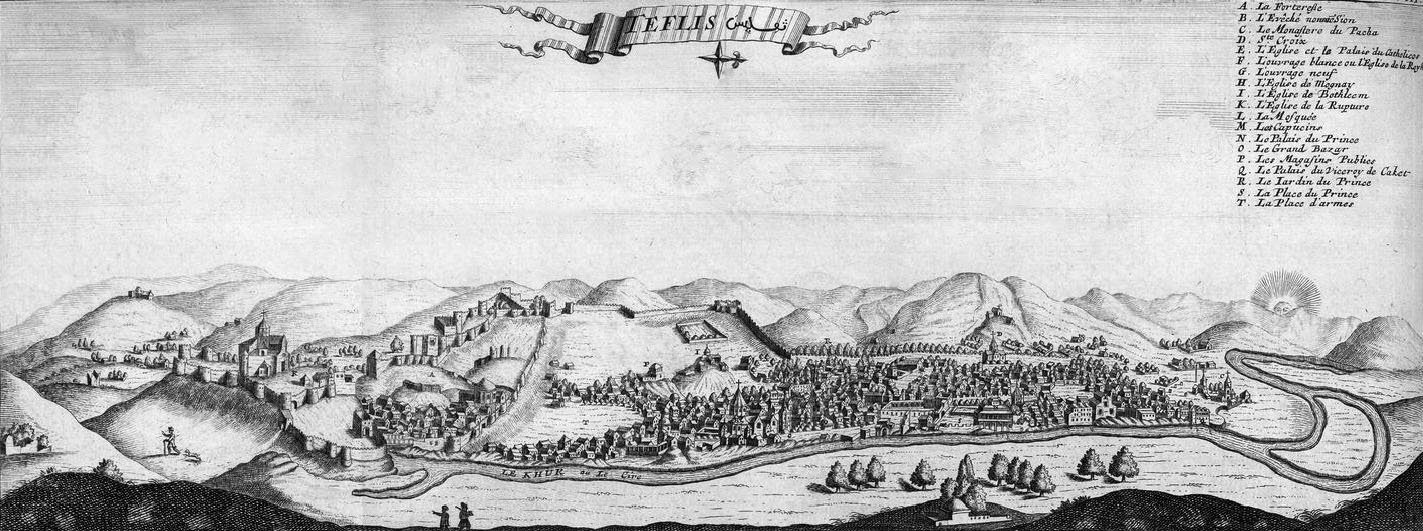
View of Tbilisi as per French traveller Jean Chardin, 1671

The Georgian Chronicles provide a darker view of Kartli’s socio-economic conditions under Rostom. Written a century after his death, they describe an annual capture of Georgian youths by Persian authorities, which encouraged a black market in slaves; nobles reportedly purchased orphans and widows to replace family members who had been taken. In 1652, when the Russian envoy Arseni Sukhanov met Catholicos Cristopher II, the latter was surprised to learn that the Russian tsar had no interest in seizing Georgian slaves even if Rostom were to accept Russian suzerainty. In the 1640s, border conflicts among the northern duchies of Kartli (Aragvi, Ksani, and Samilakharo) devastated the region’s once-prosperous valleys. Moreover, the king’s advanced age encouraged competition among minor nobles for control of royal estates, contributing—according to the Chronicles—to a significant rise in crime.

Rostom Khan permitted the aznauri class (minor nobles) to abolish peasants’ land rights, effectively restoring elements of medieval servitude. Soviet historiography later described this as the creation of a class of “land slaves”.

The merchant class of Tbilisi and Gori became the main base of popular support for Rostom, a phenomenon partly explained by the prominence of the Armenian community among local traders and its generally pro-Persian orientation. Historian Nikoloz Berdzenishvili notes that it was this Armenian merchant class that financed many of Rostom’s military campaigns. In return, the king granted them a degree of autonomy by establishing a local administrative system for the Armenians.

== Legacy ==
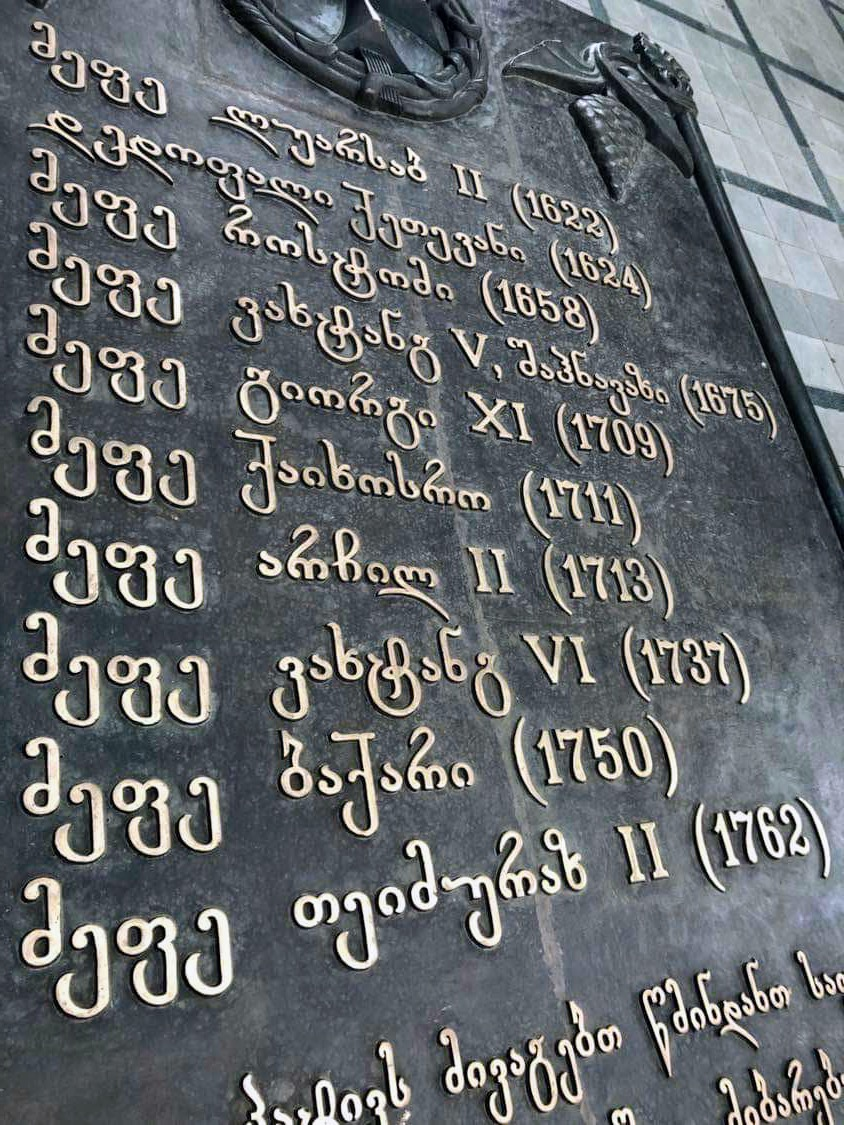
Rostom is commemorated in the Chronicle of Georgia as a Georgian king buried outside the country's borders.

Rostom Khan occupies a complex place in Georgian historiography. Historian Gocha Saitidze describes him as one of the “most interesting figures in Georgian history”. He is widely noted for the tolerance and diplomatic skill that helped Georgia recover after a long period of turmoil. His contemporaries, despite the many revolts that marked the early years of his reign, regarded him as a ruler who respected Georgian culture even though he had been raised in Persia. David Marshall Lang characterizes Rostom as one of the few Georgian monarchs who favored diplomacy and stability over the “gallant but painful ardor” of his predecessors.

Nodar Asatiani portrays Rostom as “intelligent, cunning, and strong, but also wicked and scheming”. Nikoloz Berdzenishvili takes a sharply critical view, calling him a “renegade” and a “traitor”, accusing him of sacrificing Georgia’s independence for the comfort of Persian financial support. Many historians interpret Rostom not as a Georgian king but as a Persian-appointed governor who followed the edicts of Isfahan.

Another scholarly perspective interprets the conflict between Rostom and Teimuraz not as a struggle between nationalism and Persia, but as a confrontation between two competing visions of “Georgianness,” each grounded in different principles. In this spirit, Roin Metreveli writes:

“Rostom was victorious precisely because he did not declare an unwinnable war against Georgianness. His reign did not disrupt Georgia’s social and economic order.”

The French traveler Jean Chardin, who visited Georgia a few years after Rostom’s death, described him as a ruler who “restored peace and order through clemency and justice”. Parsadan Gorgijanidze, who was raised at Rostom’s court and served as his chief diplomatic adviser, dedicated to him a major History of Georgia in 1695. Rostom is also commemorated in the Chronicle of Georgia, a monumental sculpture erected in Tbilisi in 1985 by Soviet artist Zurab Tsereteli, honoring him as a Georgian king buried outside the country’s borders.

== Bibliography ==
- Allen, W.E.D. (1932). A History of the Georgian People. London: Routledge & Keagan Paul.
- Anchabadze, Z. (2014). European Georgia: (ethnogeopolitics in Caucasus and Ethnogenetical History of Europe). publisher not indicated. ISBN 978-9941-0-6322-0.
- Asatiani, Nodar; Bendianashvili, Alexandre (1997). Histoire de la Géorgie. Paris: L'Harmattan. ISBN 2-7384-6186-7.
- Asatiani, Nodar (2008). Საქართველოს ისტორია II [History of Georgia, Volume 2] (in Georgian). Tbilisi: Tbilisi University Press. ISBN 978-9941-13-004-5.
- Asatiani, Nodar; Janelidze, Otar (2009). History of Georgia. Tbilisi: Publishing House Petite. ISBN 978-9941906367.
- Avalishvili, Z. (1937). T'eimuraz and his poem: The Martyrdom of Queen K'et'evan. BePress.
- Babaie, Sussan (2004). Slaves of the Shah: New Elites of Safavid Iran. I.B.Tauris. ISBN 1860647219.
- Berdzenishvili, Nikoloz (1964). Საქართველოს ისტორიის საკითხები VI [Questions on the History of Georgia, Volume 1] (in Georgian). Tbilisi: Metsniereba.
- Berdzenishvili, Nikoloz (1966). Საქართველოს ისტორიის საკითხები VI [Questions on the History of Georgia, Volume 3] (in Georgian). Tbilisi: Metsniereba.
- Berdzenishvili, Nikoloz (1973). Საქართველოს ისტორიის საკითხები VI [Questions on the History of Georgia, Volume 6] (in Georgian). Tbilisi: Metsniereba.
- Berdzenishvili, Nikoloz (1974). Საქართველოს ისტორიის საკითხები VI [Questions on the History of Georgia, Volume 7] (in Georgian). Tbilisi: Metsniereba.
- Beridzé, Vakhtang (1983). XVI-XVIII საუკუნეების ქართული ხუროთმოძღვრება [Georgian architecture of the 16th-18th centuries] (in Georgian). Vol. I. Tbilisi: Khelovneba.
- Brosset, Marie-Félicité (1857). Histoire moderne de la Géorgie [Modern History of Georgia] (in French). Saint Petersburg: Imperial Academy of Sciences.
- Brosset, Marie-Félicité (1858). Histoire moderne de la Géorgie. Saint Petersburg: Imperial Academy of Sciences.
- Brosset, Marie-Félicité (1859). Histoire de la Géorgie depuis l'Antiquité jusqu'au XIX siècle: Introduction et Table des matières (PDF). Saint Petersburg: Imprimerie de l'Académie impériale des sciences de Saint-Pétersbourg..
- Djanachia, Simon (1940). Izvestiya Instituta yazyka, istorii i material'noy kul'tury imeni akad. N. Ya. Marra, V–VI [Bulletin of the Institute of Language, History and Material Culture named after Academician N. Ya. Marr, V–VI]. Tbilisi: Academy of Sciences of the Georgian SSR.
- Gogoladze, Tamaz (2012). Აბაშიშვილთა ფეოდალური სახლის ისტორია XVI–XVIII საუკუნეებში [History of the Feudal House of the Abashishvili – 16th–18th Centuries] (PDF) (in Georgian). Tbilisi: St. Andrew University Press of the Patriarchate of Georgia.
- Gorgijanidze, Pharsadan (1858) [1695]. საქართველოს ისტორია (History of Georgia). VII (in Georgian). Translated by Marie-Félicité Brosset. Saint Petersburg: Imperial Academy of Sciences Printing House.
- Gugushvili, Meri (1981). Თეიმურაზ პირველი [Eimuraz the First] (in Georgian). Tbilisi: Metsnierebi.
- Itonishvili, Vakhtang (1995). Ქართულ-ოსურ ურთიერთობათა ისტორიიდან (History of Georgian–Ossetian Relations) (in Georgian). Tbilisi: Leguia. p. 110.
- Karitchashvili, D. (1894). Როსტომ მეფე (King Rostom) (PDF) (in Georgian). Tbilisi: Grigol Charkviani Press. p. 35.
- Lang, David Marshall (1957). The Last Years of Georgian Monarchy. New York: Columbia University Press.
- Metreveli, Roin; et al. (1998). Ქართული დიპლომატიის ისტორიის ნარკვევები [Essays on the history of diplomacy] (in Georgian). Tbilisi: Université d'État de Tbilissi Ivané Djavakhichvili. ISBN 5-511-00896-6.
- Metreveli, Roin (2004). Ქართული დიპლომატიის ისტორია - ქრესტომათია [History of Diplomacy - Chrestomathy] (in Georgian). Tbilisi: Université d'État de Tbilissi Ivané Djavakhichvili. ISBN 99940-20-46-3.
- Metreveli, Roin (2000). საქართველოს კათოლიკოს-პატრიარები [The Catholic Patriarchs of Georgia] (in Georgian). Tbilisi: Nekeri. ISBN 99928-58-20-6.
- Papaskiri, Zourab (2002). Საისტორიო ძიებანი [Historical research] (in Georgian). Vol. V. Tbilisi: Artanoudji. ISSN 1512-2085.
- Rayfield, Donald (2012). Edge of Empires, a History of Georgia. London: Reaktion Books. ISBN 978-1-78023-070-2.
- Salia, Kalistrat (1980). Histoire de la nation géorgienne [History of the Georgian nation] (in French). Paris: Nino Salia.
- Tsotskolauri, Avtandil (2017). საქართველოს ისტორია [History of Georgia]. Tbilisi: Saunje. ISBN 978-9941-451-79-9.
- Wardrop, John Oliver (1977) [1888]. The Kingdom of Georgia. London: Sampson Low, Martson, Searle & Rivington. ISBN 978-0-7189-0247-6.
- Lordkipanidze, Mariam; Metreveli, Roin (2000). Sakʻartʻvelos mepʻeebi (in Georgian). Tbilisi: Nekeri. ISBN 9992858362.

Preceded by Qarachaqay Khan	Commander of the gholam corps (qollar-aghasi); 1629–1632	Succeeded by Siyavosh Beg
Preceded by Teimuraz I	King of Kartli; 1633–1658	Succeeded by Vakhtang V
