= Bijan Beg Saakadze =

Safavid courtier, official and royal gholam

Bijan Beg, also known as Bijan Beg Gorji (Bezhan, Bizhan), was a Safavid courtier, official, and royal gholam from the Georgian Saakadze clan. He was one of the most influential and closest servants of Shah Abbas I (r. 1587–1629) in the latter's early reign.

== Biography ==
Bijan belonged to the gentry (aznauri) of Kartli, whose king Luarsab I he served early in his career. Afterwards, he appears to have accompanied David XI (Daud Khan) when the latter moved to the Safavid court at Qazvin in 1562 to tender his submission to king Tahmasp I (r. 1524–1576). When David XI converted to Islam on this occasion, Bijan Beg did so as well. After the Ottoman conquest of northwestern Iran and the Caucasus through the Ottoman–Safavid War of 1578–1690, Bijan followed a son of Daud Khan (either Bagrat or Khosro) and other nobles to the Safavid court, and settled there decisively. Bijan then served Safavid Shah Abbas I (r. 1587–1629) for many years, and was part of the élite gholam corps. In the first years of Abbas' reign, in 1590, he appointed darugha (prefect) of the city of Isfahan, a position he would hold for several years. This further stipulates his high-ranking position and close relationship with the reigning Safavid king, for he was entrusted with the rule of the future Safavid capital. In the Tarikh-e-Rostam (literally, "On the history of Rostam") it is mentioned that Abbas ordered Bijan to guard the royal palace after suppressing the revolt of Yaqub Khan in Fars. Iskandar Beg Munshi, a court historian at that time, also mentions Bijan and writes in particular about one of his duties whereby he was to guard an important captive. When Bagrat VII was appointed as ruler of Kartli by Abbas I in 1616, Bijan Beg was appointed to serve as lord chamberlain (Sakhltukhutsesi) at his court. Due to his high-ranking position at Luarsab I and Bagrat VII's courts, Bijan Beg is seen as an open supporter of Daud XI and his successors pro-Iranian policies.

== Family ==
Bijan's offspring and descendants also held prominent positions in the Safavid Empire. He had three sons: Rostam (died 1644), Aliqoli (died 1667)—both of them high-ranking military commanders—and Isa (died 1654). Kaykhosrow, a grandson by one of his daughters, served as the commander of the musketeer corps in 1670–1674.

== Sources ==
- Floor, Willem M. (2008). Titles and Emoluments in Safavid Iran: A Third Manual of Safavid Administration, by Mirza Naqi Nasiri. Washington, DC: Mage Publishers. p. 309. ISBN 978-1933823232.
- Floor, Willem; Herzig, Edmund, eds. (2012). Iran and the World in the Safavid Age. I.B.Tauris. pp. 481–482. ISBN 978-1780769905.
- Haneda, Masashi; Matthee, Rudi (2006). "ISFAHAN vii. SAFAVID PERIOD". Encyclopaedia Iranica, Vol. XIII, Fasc. 6. pp. 650–657.
- Maeda, Hirotake (2003). "On the Ethno-Social Backgrounds of the Four Gholam Families from Georgia in Safavid Iran". Studia Iranica. 32: 250, 257–262, 272.
