= Aliqoli Khan =

Government and military official in Safavid Iran

- Persian: علیقلی بیگ کرجی

Sepahsalar-e Iran
- In office 1650–1654
- Preceded by: Mortezaqoli Khan Qajar

Governor of the Azerbaijan Province
- In office 1650–1651
- Preceded by: Pir Budaq Khan (Pornak Torkman)
- Succeeded by: Aliqoli Khan Davalu

Personal details
- Died: 1667
- Parent: Bijan Beg (father)
- Relatives: Rostam Khan (brother); Isa Khan (brother); Imam-Quli Khan (father-in-law)
- Clan: Saakadze

Military service
- Allegiance: Safavid Iran

Aliqoli Khan (Persian: علیقلی بیگ کرجی; d. 1667) was a Safavid official, gholam, and high-ranking military commander of Georgian origin, who served during the reign of three consecutive Safavid kings (shahs); Safi (r. 1629–1642), Abbas II (r. 1642–1666) and Suleiman I (r. 1666–1694)

A member of the Saakadze clan, he was a son of Bijan Beg and a brother to Rostam Khan (d. 1644) and Isa Khan (d. 1654). Known for his "remarkable career", which spanned some fifty years, Aliqoli was at first entitled "beg" but later became "khan". He held the high posts of chancellor/chief justice (divanbegi), commander-in-chief (sepahsalar-e Iran) and governor (beglarbeg) of the Azerbaijan Province.

In 1654, Aliqoli Khan fell out of favor with then incumbent king Abbas II. Known for being the most capable Safavid ruler after his great-grandfather Abbas I (r. 1588–1629), Abbas II effectively tackled many issues that had risen as a result of Safi's reign, including in the military administration. Following complaints by soldiers, Aliqoli Khan's conduct was examined by Abbas II; as a result, he was fired on the spot. Later, during the reign of Abbas II's son and successor Suleiman I, Aliqoli Khan was rehabilitated, and Suleiman I reappointed him as the sepahsalar-e Iran.

According to the French traveller Jean Chardin, Aliqoli Khan was the de facto ruler of the Safavid Empire by the time of his death in 1667. He was married to a daughter of Imam-Quli Khan.

== Sources ==
- Floor, Willem (2001). Safavid Government Institutions. Costa Mesa, California: Mazda Publishers. pp. 18, 21, 209. ISBN 978-1568591353.
- Floor, Willem M. (2008). Titles and Emoluments in Safavid Iran: A Third Manual of Safavid Administration, by Mirza Naqi Nasiri. Washington, DC: Mage Publishers. p. 156. ISBN 978-1933823232.
- Maeda, Hirotake (2003). "On the Ethno-Social Background of Four Gholām Families from Georgia in Safavid Iran". Studia Iranica (32): 1–278.
- Matthee, Rudi (2001). "GEORGIA vii. Georgians in the Safavid Administration". Encyclopaedia Iranica, Vol. X, Fasc. 5. pp. 493–496.

Preceded by Mortezaqoli Khan Qajar	Commander-in-chief (sepahsalar-e Iran); 1650–1654	Succeeded by Vacancy?
Preceded by Pir Budaq Khan (Pornak Torkman)	Governor of Azerbaijan; 1650–1651	Succeeded by Aliqoli Khan Davalu
