= Turmanidze =

Turmanidze (Georgian: თურმანიძე) is a Georgian surname. Notable people with the surname include:

- Irakli Turmanidze (born 1984), Georgian weightlifter
- Zaza Turmanidze (born 1965), Georgian former wrestler
