= Rostam Khan (sepahsalar under Safi) =

Safavid military commander and official (c.1588–1643)

Sepahsalar–e Iran (Commander-in-chief)
- In office 1631–1643
- Monarchs: Safi I (r. 1629–1642); Abbas II (r. 1642–1666)
- Preceded by: Zeynal Khan Shamlu
- Succeeded by: Morteza Qoli Khan Qajar

Divan-begi (Chief justice)
- In office 1629–1635
- Monarch: Safi I
- Preceded by: Kalb-Ali Beg
- Succeeded by: Ali-qoli Beg

Tofangchi-aghasi (Commander of Musketeer corps)
- In office 1630
- Monarch: Safi I
- Preceded by: Zaman Beg
- Succeeded by: Mir Fatteh Qumesheh'i

Other position
- 1635–1643: Beglerbeg of Azerbaijan

Personal details
- Born: c. 1588
- Died: 1 March 1643
- Children: Safiqoli Khan; Bijan Beg
- Parent: Bijan Beg Saakadze (father)
- Noble family: Saakadze

Military service
- Allegiance: Safavid Iran
- Battles/wars: Ottoman–Safavid War (1623–1639)

Rostam Khan (Persian: رستم خان) or Rostom-Khan Saakadze (Georgian: როსტომ-ხან სააკაძე) (c. 1588 – 1 March 1643) was a high-ranking Safavid military commander and official of Georgian origin. He held the position of commander-in-chief (sepahsalar) under the Safavid shahs, Abbas I and Safi. In 1643, he was accused of treason and executed under Shah Abbas II. He features in the contemporary Persian and Georgian chronicles and is also a subject of the 17th-century Persian biography written by a certain Bijan for Rostam Khan's grandson, his namesake and a high-ranking officer in Iran.

== Career ==
Rostam Khan was a son of the Georgian nobleman Bijan Beg (Bezhan), of the Saakadze family, who attended the Georgian prince Bagrat Khan in his exile to the Safavid court after the Ottoman invasion of the Georgian lands in 1578. He had two younger brothers named Aliqoli and Isa. Rostam Khan was brought up Muslim and entered the court service under king Abbas I at the age of 11 in 1599. Having distinguished himself in the campaigns against the Ottoman armies and rising through the ranks, he became yasavol-e sohbat (personal attendant or senior squire) to the shah in 1603–4, sardar (general) in 1623–4, divan-begi (chancellor) in 1629–35, tofangchi-aghasi (commander of the musketeer corps) in 1630, sepahsalar (commander-in-chief) in 1631, and beglarbegi (governor) of Azerbaijan in 1635. Among his achievements of this period was the recapture of the holy Shia site of Najaf in Iraq during the war against the Ottomans in 1631.

== Involvement in Georgia and last years ==
At the head of an Iranian army, Rostam Khan helped a fellow Muslim Georgian in the Safavid service and a younger brother of his father's suzerain Bagrat Khan, Khosrow Mirza, secure the throne of Kartli, which Khosrow Mirza officially acceded to under the name of Rostom on 18 February 1633. However, Rostam Khan Saakadze's excesses in dealing with the Georgian opposition, especially his devastating raid into the Tsitsishvili family estates, occasioned the split between the two. The contemporary Georgian accounts attribute Rostam Khan's relentlessness to his painful childhood memories associated with the persecution of his family.

Recalled from Kartli by the Iranian government, Rostam Khan Saakadze was commander in Khorasan at the accession of Shah Abbas II in 1642. In early 1643, he was based in Mashhad to organize an effort to retake Kandahar from the Mughal Empire. The new shah'a vizier Saru Taqi considered him a personal rival and secured a decree to put him to death for having refused to obey an order from the capital. Rostam was executed in Mashhad, while his brother, the divan-begi Aliqoli, was dismissed from his post.

Nevertheless, even after Rostam Khan's downfall, his offspring continued to hold prominent positions in the Safavid Empire. His son Safiqoli (d. 1679) served as a governor and divanbegi, whereas his other son Bijan, namesake to Rostam Khan's father, served as governor (beglarbeg) of the Azerbaijan province.

== Sources ==
- Babaie, Sussan; Babayan, Kathryn; Baghdiantz-McCabe, Ina; Farhad, Massumeh (2004). Slaves of the Shah: New Elites of Safavid Iran. I.B. Tauris. ISBN 978-0857716866.
- Floor, Willem (2001). Safavid Government Institutions. Costa Mesa, California: Mazda Publishers. ISBN 978-1568591353.
- Floor, Willem M. (2008). Titles and Emoluments in Safavid Iran: A Third Manual of Safavid Administration, by Mirza Naqi Nasiri. Washington, DC: Mage Publishers. pp. 156, 309. ISBN 978-1933823232.
- Maeda, Hirotake (2003). "On the Ethno-Social Background of Four Gholām Families from Georgia in Safavid Iran". Studia Iranica (32): 1–278.
- Maeda, Hirotake (2012). "Slave Elites Who Returned Home: Georgian Vali-king Rostom and the Safavid Household Empire" (PDF). Memoirs of the Research Department of the Toyo Bunko. 69.
- Bregel, Yu. (2004). "DĪWĀN-BEGI". In Bearman, P. J.; Bianquis, Th.; Bosworth, C. E.; van Donzel, E. & Heinrichs, W. P. (eds.). The Encyclopaedia of Islam, Second Edition. Volume XII: Supplement. Leiden: E. J. Brill. pp. 227–228. ISBN 978-90-04-13974-9.
- Floor, Willem (2000). "The Secular Judicial System in Safavid Persia". Studia Iranica. 29 (1): 9–60. doi:10.2143/SI.29.1.565532.
- Matthee, Rudi (2012). Persia in Crisis: Safavid Decline and the Fall of Isfahan. I.B.Tauris. ISBN 978-1845117450.
- Newman, Andrew J. (2008). Safavid Iran: Rebirth of a Persian Empire. I.B.Tauris. p. 186. ISBN 978-0857716613.
- Rota, Giorgio (1998). "Three Little-Known Persian Sources of the Seventeenth Century". Iranian Studies. 31 (2): 159–176. doi:10.1080/00210869808701903. JSTOR 4311143.
- Storey, C.A. (1927–39). "Persian Literature: A Bio-bibliographical Survey". 1, pt. I.

Preceded by Zaman Beg	Commander of the musketeer corps (tofangchi-aghasi); 1630	Succeeded by Mir Fatteh Qumesheh'i
Preceded by Zeynal Khan Shamlu	Commander-in-chief (sepahsalar); 1631–1643	Succeeded by Mortezaqoli Khan Qajar
Preceded by Pir Budaq Khan (Pornak Torkman) (1st term)	Governor of Azerbaijan; 1635–1643	Succeeded by Pir Budaq Khan (Pornak Torkman) (2nd term)
