= List of Tofangchi-aghasis =

Commanders of Safavid musketeer corps

The Tofangchi-aghasi, also spelled Tufangchi-aqasi, and otherwise known as the Tofangchi-bashi, was the commander of the Safavid Empire's musketeer corps, the tofangchis. The tofangchi-aghasi was assisted by numerous officers, i.e. minbashis, yuzbashis, dahbashis, as well as an administrative staff (i.e. vizier, mostoufi). Though the tofangchi-aghasi was considered to be a high-ranking office on paper, de facto, it was one of the lowest on the "military totem-pole" compared to the other commanding offices. Nevertheless, the post was generally held by scions of noble families.

== List of Tofangchi-aghasis ==
=== Reign of Ismail I ===
- Mirza Shah Hossein (1516)

=== Reign of Tahmasp I ===
- Kur Hasan (1529)
- ?
- Mir Saheb-e Qoshun (1576)

=== Reign of Ismail II ===
- Mir Saheb-e Qoshun (1576)
- ?

=== Reign of Mohammad Khodabanda ===
- ?

=== Reign of Abbas I ===
- Esma'il Beg (1614–1615)
- Zaman Beg (1629) (Note: Held the posts of nazer and tofangchi-aghasi.)

=== Reign of Safi ===
- Rostam Beg (1630)
- Mir Fatteh Qumesheh'i (1634–1635)
- Aqa Taher (1635–1643) (Note: Brother of his predecessor. Also known as Mir Fattah-e Thani.)

=== Reign of Abbas II ===
- Aqa Taher (1635–1643)
- Qalander Soltan Chuleh (1643–1661) (Note: Tofangchi-aghasi and tupchi-bashi in 1660-1661. "He also received Aberqu as a teyul, which, since then, always has been bestowed on the tofangchi-aghasi.")
- Budaq Soltan (1661–1668)

=== Reign of Suleiman I ===
- Budaq Soltan (1661–1668)
- Sheikh 'Ali Khan Zanganeh (1668–1669)
- Abbas Beg Zanganeh (1669–1670) (Note: Eldest son of his predecessor, Sheikh 'Ali Khan Zanganeh. Later became mīr shekār-bāshi ("master of the hunt") as well.)
- Kaykhosrow Khan (1670–1674)
- Hajji 'Ali Khan Zanganeh (1674–1691)
- Eshaq Khan (?)

=== Reign of Soltan Hoseyn ===
- Eshaq Khan (?)
- Musa Khan (1711–1715)
- Hosein Ali Khan (1717–1720) (Note: Appointed on 27 September 1715. Was disgraced in the "alleged conspiracy" of 1720.)
- Mohammad Ali Khan Mokri (1720–1722)

=== Reign of Tahmasp II ===
- Ahmad Khan (1723)
- Shahverdi Khan Cheshmkazik (1724) (Note: Also referred to as Shahverdi Khan Kivanlu by Mostoufi.)

== Sources ==
- Floor, Willem (2001). Safavid Government Institutions. Costa Mesa, California: Mazda Publishers. pp. 176–188. ISBN 978-1568591353.
- Matthee, Rudi (2012). Persia in Crisis: Safavid Decline and the Fall of Isfahan. I.B.Tauris. p. 258. ISBN 978-1845117450.
