= Tofangchi =

Iranian musketeers (early modern era)

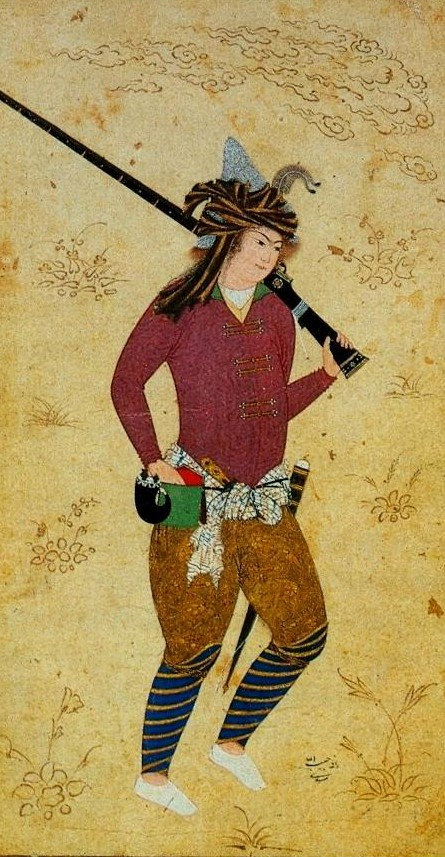
- A tofangchi during the reign of Abbas the Great. Painting by Habib-Allah Mashadi, dated c. 1600. Museum of Islamic Art, Berlin
- Founded: 1516
- Country: Iran
- Type: Mostly Infantry, rarely cavalry
- Role: Standing professional military
- Size: 8,000 (1517); 15,000–20,000 (1521); 20,000, 50,000 or 60,000 (between 1587–1629); 40,000–50,000 (between 1642–1666); 10,000 (1797)
- Equipment: Musket

Commanders
- Commander: Tofangchi-aghasi

A tofangchi (Persian: تفنگچی, lit. 'rifle-person') was a musketeer contingent in early modern Iran. They were mostly recruited from the Iranian-speaking peasantry.

== History ==
=== Safavid era ===
Before the establishment of the Safavid Empire, guns and cannon were being used in Iran, having been brought there in c. 1470. In 1514, the Qizilbash forces of the Safavids were defeated at the battle of Chaldiran by the Ottoman Empire, who gained the upper hand through their effective use of firearms. Therefore, in 1516, Shah Ismail I (r. 1501–1524) ordered his vakil (regent) Mirza Shah Hossein to create the tofangchi (musketeer) contingent, a word which literally meant "rifle-person". Shah Ismail had 50 cannons and 2,000 arquebuses made. With the introduction of the tofangchis, the non-tribal component of the Safavid army was initially minor but eventually became a significant and expanding part. In 1517, tofangchis numbered 8,000. Over time, their numbers would change; in 1521, they numbered between 15,000–20,000. The tofangchis were trained by Portuguese military personnel, who were either officially assigned or deserters.

The inclusion of Portuguese and Ottoman janissaries defectors further increased the numbers of the tofangchis. 700 janissaries defected to the Safavids in 1518, followed by another 1500 in 1519. Shah Ismail I, like later Safavid shahs, enjoyed showcasing the abilities of his tofangchis. Firearms were also widely used under Shah Tahmasp I (r. 1524–1576). Since tofangchis were typically stationed in fortresses with the responsibility of defending them from any attackers, thousands of them occasionally took part in combat or in the defense of fortresses. In c. 1600, the tofangchis were viewed with disdain by the Qizilbash soldiers, despite their extensive military service. However, Abbas the Great (r. 1587–1629) regarded them highly. The tofangchis from the Mazandaran province were his favourite. In 1603, 10,000 tofangchis were among the soldiers under Shah Abbas I during his Balkh campaign. During the Ottoman–Safavid War of 1623–1639, the Safavids mostly used tofangchis. The tofangchis either numbered around 20,000, 50,000, or 60,000 under Shah Abbas I, and around 40,000–50,000 under Shah Abbas II (r. 1642–1666).

Modern firearms remained in use after the 1650s, although their use became less common during the Safavid era. Usually native Iranian speakers from peasant backgrounds and recruited from all over Iran, the tofangchis were essentially local militia. The tofangchis were a local defense force, primarily scattered throughout the countryside, despite their extensive involvement in military operations around Iran's frontiers. During times of peace, the tofangchis worked as farmers. There was also tofangchis from Qizilbash tribes such as the Ajrlu, Chaghni, Enanlu, and Rumlu as well as from non-Qizilbash tribes such as the Chaghatay, Lakhi, and Mamasani.

The tofangchis usually fought as infantry, earning the name pivadegan-e tofang, but have also been reported to fight as cavalry. The French-born English traveller Jean Chardin, writing in the 17th century, said that the tofangchis operated on foot, but they rode horses for their journey.

The commander of the tofangchis was the tofangchi-aghasi, who had help from a number of officers, including administrative personnel, min-bashis, yuz-bashis, panjah-bashis, and dah-bashis. A vizier and a mostoufi (accountant) assisted the tofangchi-aghasi by managing the troop list of the tofangchis. In 1665, the salary of the tofangchis was reported to have been 5–7 tomans annually.

=== Afsharid, Zand and Qajar eras ===
The Afsharid shah Nader Shah (r. 1732–1747) also recruited the tofangchis from the Iranian peasantry. The Zand ruler Karim Khan (r. 1751–1779) also used tofangchis, recruited from the peasantry of western and central Iran, but also notably the Dashtestan area adjacent to the Persian Gulf. Similar to Shah Abbas I, the Qajar shah Agha Mohammad Khan (r. 1794–1797) regarded his Mazandarani tofangchis as one of his most reliable and competent soldiers. He stayed and slept among them during dangerous periods, and referred to them as the "Shah's bodyshirt" (pirahan-e tan-e shah). By the time of Agha Mohammad Khan's death in 1797, the tofangchis made up 10,000 of his 60,000-man army. They had been recruited from the peasantry of Mazandaran and from the area between Arak and Hamadan.

== Sources ==
- Behrooz, Maziar (2023). Iran at War: Interactions with the Modern World and the Struggle with Imperial Russia. I.B. Tauris. ISBN 978-0755637379.
- Eskandari-Qajar, Manoutchehr (2005). "Mohammad Shah Qajar's Nezam-e Jadid and Colonel Colombari's Zambourakchis". International Qajar Studies Association. 5: 53–79. ISBN 9056130706.
- Farrokh, Kaveh (2015). "The Military Campaigns of Shah Abbas I in Azerbaijan and the Caucasus". In Asatrian, Garnik (ed.). Studies on Iran and The Caucasus: In Honour of Garnik Asatrian. Brill Publishers. pp. 75–96. ISBN 978-90-04-30206-8.
- Floor, Willem (2001). Safavid Government Institutions. Mazda Publishers. ISBN 978-1568591353.
- Perry, John R. (1986). "Army iv. Afšar and Zand Periods". In Yarshater, Ehsan (ed.). Encyclopædia Iranica (Online ed.). Encyclopædia Iranica Foundation. ISBN 978-0939214693.
