= Darugha =

Territorial subdivision in the Mongol Empire

Darugha (Bashkir: даруга, Tatar: даруга, romanized: daruğa, from Mongol: daru-, 'to press, to seal') was a territorial subdivision in the Mongol Empire. A darugha was ruled by a darughachi.

== History ==
It was a territorial subdivision in the Mongol Empire.

Later, the term was used for the province, particularly in Kazan and the Siberian Khanates in the 15th and 16th centuries. It was used in the Turkic-populated parts of the Russian Empire in the 16th to 18th centuries. In Safavid Iran, it was a title meaning prefect. One of the many Safavid darughas was Mirman Mirimanidze.

In 1762, the Bashkir people controlled the Kazan, Nogai, Osin and Siberian darughas.

In the Mughal Empire, a daroga was the title of a district police officer. This title was kept until the 20th century during the British Raj.

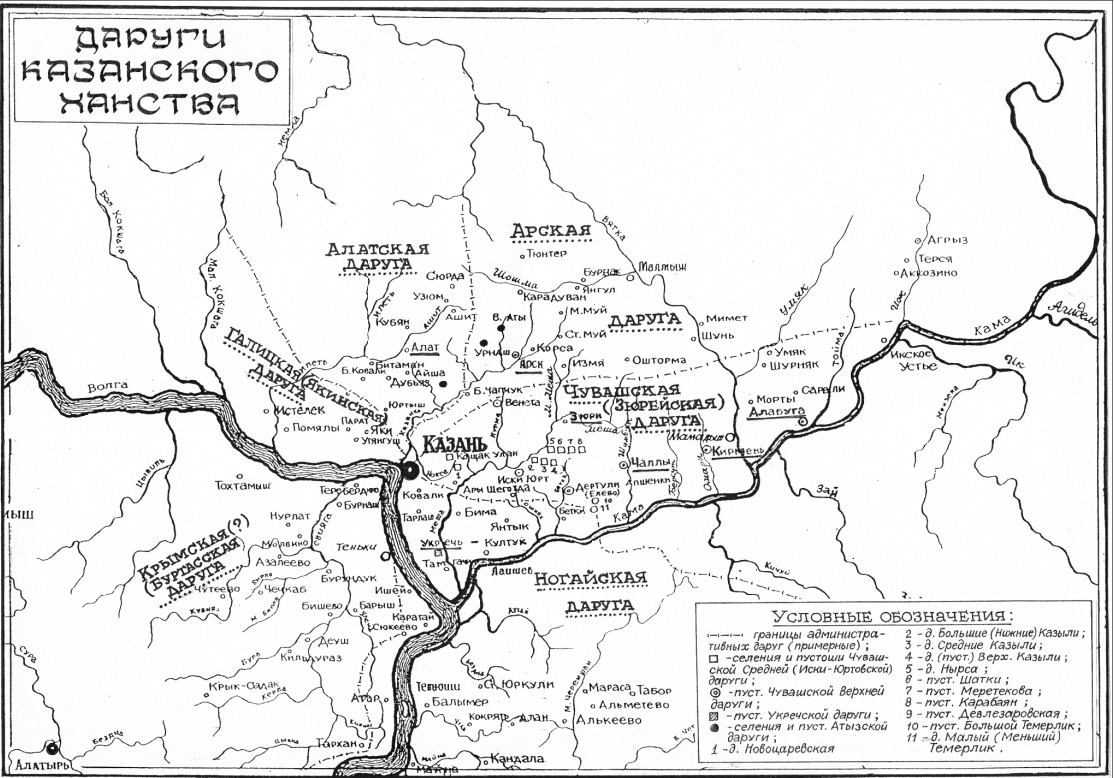
Daruga Khanate of Kazan

In the Kazan Khanate, there were five darugs:

- Galician Daruga - (trade route to the Russians)
- Alat Daruga - (trade route to the Cheremis Mari)
- Arskaya Daruga - (trade route to the Ars Udmurts)
- Zureya Daruga - (trade route to the Bulgar Chuvash)
- Nogai Daruga - (trade route to the Kipchaks, Bashkir and Nogay)

== Sources ==
- "Дарога или Даруга" . Brockhaus and Efron Encyclopedic Dictionary (in Russian). 1906.
