= Tarkhan-Mouravi =

The Tarkhan-Mouravi family coat of arms

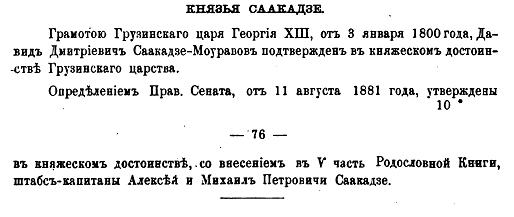
Princely Saakadze family in the Russian nobility register (1892)

The House of Tarkhan-Mouravi (Georgian: თარხან-მოურავი; Tarkhnishvili, თარხნიშვილი, or Tarkhan-Mouravishvili, თარხან-მოურავიშვილი) is a Georgian noble family, claiming descent from the Shamkhal dynasty of Tarki, in Dagestan. Originally known as Saakadze (სააკაძე), they acquired, in the 1640s, the title of prince (tavadi) and the new surname, which is a composite of the two hereditary offices, mouravi and tarkhan. The family was reconfirmed as the princes (knyaz) by the Russian Empire in 1826 and 1850. The cadets continued to be called Saakadze and remained members of the untitled nobility (aznauri) until 1881 when they were also elevated to the princely rank.

== History ==
The earliest record of the Saakadze clan dates back to the reign of Queen Tamar. The first known member of the family, Siaush Saakadze (died c. 1606), was a loyal officer in the service of Simon I of Kartli, who gave him the office of mouravi of Tbilisi in the 1580s. His son, Giorgi Saakadze (the Grand Mouravi; c. 1570 – 1629) pursued a contradictory and turbulent career. He dominated the political life in eastern Georgia for years in which he firstly collaborated with the Persian Safavids, conspired against them later on, and eventually ended up his life in exile in the Ottoman Empire after the Battle of Bazaleti. His last surviving son, Ioram (died 1664) returned to Georgia, and was conferred with the titles of prince and tarkhan by Rostom of Kartli early in the 1640s. His descendants assumed the surname of Tarkhan-Mouravi. Their fiefdom centered on the village of Akhalkalaki and the Tedzami river valley in Inner Kartli. Throughout the 17th century, the Saakadze's were one of the most successful noble families in Safavid Iran, especially through Bijan Beg Saakadze and his descendants.
