= Divan-begi =

Iranian judicial office

- Style: ʿĀlī-jāh (Serene Highness)
- Type: Moqarrab al-Khāqān
- Member of: Jānqī (Council of State)
- Residence: Keshīk-Khāneh, Ālī Qāpū (Royal court's Guardhouse)
- Seat: Isfahan, Safavid Iran
- Nominator: The king
- Appointer: The king
- Term length: No fixed length
- Formation: 1501
- First holder: Khadem Beg Talish
- Unofficial names: [A]Mir-e Divan; Divan-begi-bashi
- Deputy: Nāʿeb-e Dīvān-begī
- Salary: 500 tomāns (officially) (Note: sometimes was reached to 1000, 3000 or even 6000 tomāns.)

The Divan-begi (Note: Also spelled Divan-Beigi, Divanbegi or Diwan-Begi.) (Persian: دیوان‌بیگی, romanized: Dīvān-beīgī) was a high-ranking official in Judicial system of Safavid Iran (1501–1736), who acted as chief justice of Safavid capital and all over the kingdom's courts. It was the Persian form of Turkic Diwan-begi office, also known as the Imperial Chief Justice or Lord High Justice. Divan-begis presided over an appeals court for the kingdom, except for cases involving military officers or religious officials. Divan-begis had deputies to assist them.

== List of Divan-begis ==
=== Reign of Ismail I ===
- Khadem Beg Talish (1501)
- Beiram Beg Qaramanlu (1501–1514)
- Husam Beg Qaramanlu (Note: son of the previous Divan-begi) (1514)
- Amir Harun (Note: Vali of Lar) (1514)

=== Reign of Tahmasp I ===
- Kopek Sultan Ustajlu (Note: the King's chief deputy (Vakil) at the same time) (1524)
- Mohammad Khan Takkalu (Note: as Mīr-e Dīvān (Persian: میر دیوان)) (1543/4)
- Ebrahim Khan (1541–1557)
- Ma'sum Beg Safavi (Note: then appointed as the King's chief deputy (Vakil) and Vizier of the Safavid Empire) (1550)
- Badhr Khan (1551)
- Ebrahim Khan (1554–1566)

=== Reign of Ismail II ===
- Ebrahim Mirza (Note: the king's nephew) (1576)
- Shahrokh Khan Dhu'l-Qadr (1576)

=== Reign of Mohammad Khodabanda ===
- Hamzeh Khan Ustajlu (1578)
- Salman Khan Ustajlu (Note: then appointed as Grand Vizier of the Safavid Empire) (1582)
- Ali-qoli Khan Ustajlu (Note: as Dīvān-begī-bāshī (Persian: دیوان‌بیگی‌باشی)) (1585)
- Ismail-qoli Khan(1586)

=== Reign of Abbas I ===
- Baktash Khan Afshar (1588)
- Khan Mohammad (1602/3)
- Ali-qoli Khan Shamlu (1605–1624)
- Agha Beg (Note: former Nāʿeb-e Dīvān-begī of the previous Divan-begi) (1624–1627)
- Kalb-Ali Beg (1627–1629)

=== Reign of Safi ===
- Rostam Beg (Note: then appointed as commanders-in-chief of Safavid Empire under name of "Rostam Khan") (1629–1635)
- Ali-qoli Beg (1635–1642)

=== Reign of Abbas II ===
- Morteza-qoli Beg Shamlu (1642–1645)
- Oghurlu Beg Qajar (Note: former prefect (darugha) of daftar-Khāneh (Persian: دفترخانه)) (28 November 1645–1657)
- Safi-qoli Beg (Note: then appointed as governor-general (beglarbeg) of Mashhad under name of "Safi-qoli Khan") (1657–1663)
- Evaz Beg (1663)

=== Reign of Suleiman I ===
- Abbas-qoli Beg (1663–1666)
- Mohammad-qoli Khan (1666)
- ? (Note: unknown office-holder who replaced by the Mīr-āb (Persian: میر آب)) (1666)
- Abu'l-Qasem Beg Shamlu (Note: son of Jani Beg Khan Shamlu) (1670/1)
- Mohammad-Hassan (1673)
- Zeinal Khan (1680)
- Rostam Beg (1691)
- Musa Beg (1692–1696)

=== Reign of Sultan Husayn ===
- Musa Beg (1692–1696)
- Ali-Mardan Khan (Note: then appointed as governor of Kohgiluyeh at October 1696) (1696)
- Yar-Mohammad (1697/8)
- Safi-qoli Beg (1697/8)
- Levan Mirza (Note: also spelled as Leon Mirza) (1700)
- Safi-qoli Khan (1712–February 1715)
- Ismail Beg (1715–1716)
- Jafar Khan (Note: former governor of Herat) (1716)
- Safi-qoli Khan (Note: former governor of Tabriz; then renamed to "Ali-qoli Khan" and appointed as Ṣāḥeb-nasaq (Persian: صاحب‌نسق‌); His son became prefect (darugha) of Isfahan.) (1716)
- Mohammad-qoli Khan (1718–1720)
- Rajab-Ali Beg (1720–1722)

=== Reign of Abbas III ===
- Mohammad-qoli Khan (Note: former Tupchi-bashi) (1732)

== Footnotes ==
=== Sources ===
- Abisaab, Rula Jurdi (2018). "Delivering Justice: The Monarch's 'Urfi Courts and the Shari'a in Safavid Iran". In Emon, Anver M.; Ahmed, Rumee (eds.). The Oxford Handbook of Islamic Law. Oxford: Oxford University Press. pp. 511–537. ISBN 978-0-19-967901-0.
- Bregel, Yu. (2004). "DĪWĀN-BEGI". In Bearman, P. J.; Bianquis, Th.; Bosworth, C. E.; van Donzel, E. & Heinrichs, W. P. (eds.). The Encyclopaedia of Islam, Second Edition. Volume XII: Supplement. Leiden: E. J. Brill. pp. 227–228. ISBN 978-90-04-13974-9.
- Floor, Willem (2000). "The Secular Judicial System in Safavid Persia". Studia Iranica. 29 (1): 9–60. doi:10.2143/SI.29.1.565532.
- Floor, Willem (2001). Safavid Government Institutions. Costa Mesa, California: Mazda Publishers. ISBN 1-568591-35-7.
- Floor, Willem (2009). "JUDICIAL AND LEGAL SYSTEMS iv. JUDICIAL SYSTEM FROM THE ADVENT OF ISLAM THROUGH THE 19TH CENTURY". In Yarshater, Ehsan (ed.). Encyclopædia Iranica (online ed.).
- Khezri, Ahmad-Reza (2013). دیوان‌بیگی [DIVAN-BEIGI]. In Haddad-Adel, Gholam-Ali (ed.). Encyclopaedia of the World of Islam (in Persian). Vol. 18. Tehran: Encyclopaedia Islamica Foundation. ISBN 978-600-447019-3.
- Poormohammadi Amlashi, Nasrollah; Ansari, Somayyeh (Autumn 2014 – Winter 2015). شکل‌گیری و عملکرد منصب دیوان‌بیگی در دوره صفویه [Formation and Performance of Divan Beigi Post in Safavid Era]. Tahqiqāt-e Tārikh-e Ejtemā'i (Social History Studies) (in Persian). 4 (8). Tehran: IHCS: 49–71. ISSN 2383-0492.
- Nasiri, Mirza Naqi (2008). Floor, Willem (ed.). Titles & Emoluments in Safavid Iran: A Third Manual of Safavid Administration. Translated by Willem Floor. Washington, D.C.: Mage Publishers. ISBN 978-1-933823-23-2.
- Savory, Roger M. (1996). "DĪVĀNBEGĪ ii. IN THE SAFAVID PERIOD". In Yarshater, Ehsan (ed.). Encyclopædia Iranica. Vol. VII. Costa Mesa, California: Mazda Publishers. pp. 439–440. ISBN 1-568590-28-8.
