= General Beg =

General Beg may refer to:

- Aslamas Beg (fl. 1690s), Safavid military commander
- Mirza Aslam Beg (born 1931), Pakistan Army four-star general
- Otar Beg (c. 1583–1662/63), Safavid military commander
- Siyavosh Beg (qollar-aghasi) (fl. 1640s–1650s), Safavid military commander
- Tardi Beg (fl. 1650s), Mughal Empire military commander
