= Khadem Beg Talish =

Safavid governor of Baghdad from 1508 to 1514

- خادم بیگ تالش

Divan-begi (Chief justice)
- In office 1501
- Monarch: Ismail I
- Preceded by: Office established
- Succeeded by: Beiram Beg Qaramanlu

Governor of Baghdad
- In office 1508–1514
- Monarch: Ismail I
- Preceded by: Office established
- Succeeded by: Seyyed Suleiman

Personal details
- Died: 23 August 1514 Chaldoran, Safavid Iran
- Cause of death: Killed in action
- Resting place: Ardabil, Iran

Military service
- Allegiance: Safavid Iran
- Battles/wars: Battle of Chaldiran †

Khadem Beg Talish (Persian: خادم بیگ تالش; died 23 August 1514) was a Sufi and military commander of Talysh origin, who served the Safavid order, and later the dynasty established by the order, the Safavid dynasty. Khadem Beg was a retainer of Soltan Ali Safavi and his brother Ismail Mirza, when they were child, and an important advisor to the Shah Ismail I (r. 1501–1524).

He died in the Battle of Chaldiran.

== Career ==
Khadem Beg served in many of the campaigns of Shah Ismail, especially in one against Arabian Iraq. In 1508, the Shah conquered Baghdad and made him the first Safavid governor of Baghdad and the whole province, an office which included the task of supervising the Holy shrine of Karbala. Before holding governorship of Baghdad, he was Amir-e Divan (later called Divan-beigi) of the Safavid Empire.

He also held the position of Khalifat al-Khulafa of the Safavid order from 1498.

== Family ==
Yadegar Ali Sultan Talish, Khadem Beg's grandson, became Khalifat al-Khulafa for a brief time in 1626–1627 and succeeded by his son, Badr Khan Sultan Talish.

== See also ==
- Abdal Beg Talish

== Sources ==
- Floor, Willem (2000). "The Secular Judicial System in Safavid Persia". Studia Iranica. 29 (1): 9–60. doi:10.2143/SI.29.1.565532.
- Floor, Willem (2003). "The Khalifeh al-kholafa of the Safavid Sufi Order". Zeitschrift der Deutschen Morgenländischen Gesellschaft. 153 (1): 51–86. JSTOR 43381252.
- Nasiri, Mirza Naqi (2008). Floor, Willem (ed.). Titles & Emoluments in Safavid Iran: A Third Manual of Safavid Administration. Translated by Willem Floor. Washington, D.C.: Mage Publishers. ISBN 1-933823-23-2.
- Reid, James J. (1983). Tribalism and Society in Islamic Iran, 1500–1629. Malibu, California: Undena Publications. ISBN 0-890031-25-8.

Religious titles
Preceded by ?	Khalifat al-Khulafa of Safavid order 1498–1514	Succeeded by ?
Legal offices
New title	Amir-e Divan; 1501–?	Succeeded by Beiram Beg Qaramanlu
Political offices
Preceded by Barik Beg Purnak as Aq Qoyunlu governor	Governor of Baghdad; 1508–1514	Vacant Title next held by Seyyed Suleiman
