= Mehtar Davud =

Safavid Chamberlain

Chamberlain (Mehtar)
- In office 1639–1662
- Monarchs: Safi I (r. 1629–1642); Abbas II (r. 1642–1666)
- Preceded by: Shahnazar Beg
- Succeeded by: Agha Mobarak

Personal details
- Died: September 1662
- Relations: Evaz Beg (brother)

Mehtar Davud (died September 1662) was a high-ranking Safavid court eunuch of Georgian origin, who served as the chamberlain (hence his title, mehtar) during the reign of the kings Safi (1629-1642) and Abbas II (1642-1666).

Davud was one of the most influential and important eunuchs at the time. In the past, he had served as a qurchi-e tarkesh and was a gholam-e khasseh and rish-sefid-e haram. His brother Evaz Beg served as a government official, while his other brother, Mohammad Beg, was also a eunuch, and served as imperial treasurer. An important factor in the explanation for the family's renowned position was Davud's own prominent position at the court, which allowed him to safeguard and exercise influence on behalf of the rest of the family.

== Sources ==
- Floor, Willem (2001). Safavid Government Institutions. Costa Mesa, California: Mazda Publishers. ISBN 978-1568591353.
- Floor, Willem M. (2006). The Persian Gulf: A Political and Economic History of Five Port Cities, 1500-1730. Mage Publishers. p. 283. ISBN 978-1933823126.
- Floor, Willem M.; Faghfoory, Mohammad H. (2007). The Dastur Al-moluk: A Safavid State Manual, by Mohammad Rafi' al-Din Ansari. Mazda Publishers. pp. 180–181, 184. ISBN 978-1568591957.
- Matthee, Rudi (2012). Persia in Crisis: Safavid Decline and the Fall of Isfahan. I.B.Tauris. pp. 55, 60–61. ISBN 978-1845117450.

Preceded by Shahnazar Beg	Chamberlain (mehtar); 1639-1662	Succeeded by Agha Mobarak
