= Vakhushti Khan =

Safavid official and royal gholam

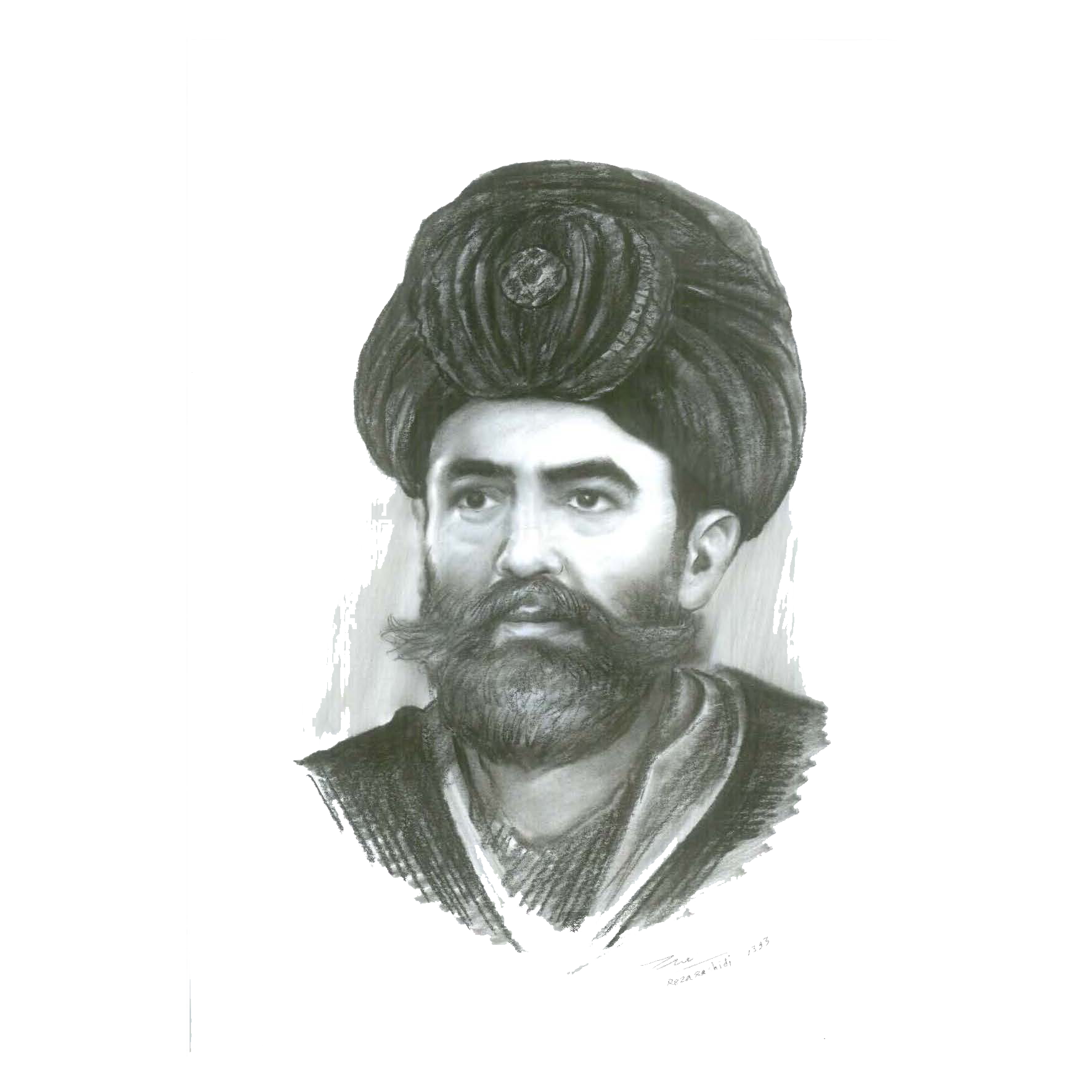

Governor of Shushtar
- In office September 1632 – 1667 or 1669
- Monarchs: Safi of Persia, Abbas II of Persia, Suleiman I of Persia
- Preceded by: Aqa Moharram
- Succeeded by: Fath 'Ali Khan

Personal details
- Died: 1667/69
- Relations: Otar / Zu al-Faqār (brother), Gorjasbi / Mansur (brother), Kaykhosrow (brother), Rodam (wife of Vakhtang V)
- Children: Aslamas Beg
- Parent: Aslamaz
- Occupation: Official
- Clan: Orbeliani

Military service
- Allegiance: Safavid Iran

Vakhushti Khan (d. 1667/69) was a Safavid official and royal gholam from the Georgian Orbeliani clan, who served as the governor (hakem) of Shushtar from September 1632 up to his death in 1667 or 1669. His descendants continued to flourish in Shushtar well into Nader Shah's era (r. 1736–1747).

Vakhushti was a son of the Georgian nobleman Aslamaz and had at least two other brothers named Otar (Zu al-Faqār) and Gorjasbi (Mansur), who held prominent positions as well. According to Alexander Orbeliani (1802–1869), he had one more brother named Kaykhosrow. He was a close relative of Rodam, the wife of King Vakhtang V (Shah Navaz Khan).

His name Vakhushti derives from Old Iranian vahišta- ("paradise", superlative of veh "good", i.e., "superb, excellent"). Its equivalent in Middle Persian is wahišt and in New Persian behešt.

Vakhusti's second son, Aslamas (also known as Aslan), served as commander of the élite gholam corps (qollar-aghasi) in 1693–1695, and as governor (beglarbeg) of Qandahar in 1694–95, or 1696–1697.

== Sources ==
- Floor, Willem (2001). Safavid Government Institutions. Costa Mesa, California: Mazda Publishers. ISBN 978-1568591353.
- Floor, Willem M. (2008). Titles and Emoluments in Safavid Iran: A Third Manual of Safavid Administration, by Mirza Naqi Nasiri. Washington, DC: Mage Publishers. pp. 257, 290–291. ISBN 978-1933823232.
- Maeda, Hirotake (2003). "On the Ethno-Social Background of Four Gholām Families from Georgia in Safavid Iran". Studia Iranica (32): 1–278.
- Maeda, Hirotake (2007). "Parsadan Gorgijanidze's Exile to Shushtar: A Biographical Episode of a Georgian Official in the Service of the Safavid Shahs". The Journal of Sophia Asian Studies (in Japanese). 25.

Preceded by Aqa Moharram	Governor of Shushtar; September 1632–1667/69	Succeeded by Fath 'Ali Khan
