= Vakhushti =

Vakhushti may refer to:

- Prince Vakhushti of Kartli (died 1757), Georgian royal prince, geographer, historian and cartographer
- Vakhushti Abashidze (died 1751), Georgian nobleman
- Vakhushti Khan (died 1667/69), Georgian official in the Safavid Empire
