= Mansur Khan (qollar-aghasi) =

Safavid military commander

Commander of the Gholam
- In office 1663–1663
- Preceded by: Kaykhosrow Khan
- Succeeded by: Isa Beg

Governor of Qandahar
- In office >1693–Unknown
- Preceded by: Otar Beg Orbeliani
- Succeeded by: Jamshid Khan

Military service
- Allegiance: Safavid Iran

Gorjasbi Beg, (Note: Also spelled as "Garjasb", "Karjasi", or "Garjasi".) better known as Mansur Khan, was a Safavid military commander, royal gholam, and official from the Georgian Orbeliani clan. He served as the commander of the empire's élite gholam corps (qollar-aghasi) sometime before 1693, and as the governor (beglarbeg) of Qandahar in 1663.

He was a son of the Georgian nobleman Aslamaz, and had at least two brothers, Otar (Zu al-Faqār) and Vakhushti, who held prominent positions like him. According to Alexander Orbeliani (1802–1869), he had one more brother named Kaykhosrow.

== Sources ==
- Floor, Willem (2001). Safavid Government Institutions. Costa Mesa, California: Mazda Publishers. p. 173. ISBN 978-1568591353.
- Floor, Willem M. (2008). Titles and Emoluments in Safavid Iran: A Third Manual of Safavid Administration, by Mirza Naqi Nasiri. Washington, DC: Mage Publishers. p. 257. ISBN 978-1933823232.
- Maeda, Hirotake (2003). "On the Ethno-Social Background of Four Gholām Families from Georgia in Safavid Iran". Studia Iranica (32): 247–249, 253, 270.
- Matthee, Rudi; Mashita, Hiroyuki (2010). "KANDAHAR iv. From The Mongol Invasion Through the Safavid Era". Encyclopaedia Iranica, Vol. XV, Fasc. 5. pp. 478–484.

Preceded by Kaykhosrow Khan	Commander of the gholam corps (qollar-aghasi) before 1693	Succeeded by Isa Beg
Preceded by Otar Beg Orbeliani	Governor of Qandahar; 1663–?	Succeeded by Jamshid Khan
