= Cheragh Khan Zahedi =

Iranian officer in Safavid Iran

Qurchi-bashi (Head of the Royal Bodyguard)
- In office 1631–1632
- Monarch: Safi I
- Preceded by: Isa Khan Safavi
- Succeeded by: →Emir Khan Soklan Dhu'l-Qadr→Jani Beg Khan Shamlu

Personal details
- Died: 1632
- Parent: Shaykh Sharif (father)

Cheragh Khan Zahedi (Persian: چراغ خان زاهدی), also known as Pirzadeh (Persian: پیرزاده), was an Iranian officer in Safavid Iran, who served as the head of the royal bodyguard (qurchi-bashi) from 1631 until his death in 1632.

== Biography ==
Cheragh Khan was the son of a certain Shaikh Sharif and a descendant of Zahed Gilani, the prominent Iranian grandmaster (murshid), and the teacher of Safi-ad-din Ardabili, who was the eponymous ancestor of the Safavid dynasty. Cheragh Khan was a supporter of the family of the qurchi-bashi Isa Khan Safavi, which was a cousin family to the ruling Safavid dynasty. However, in 1632/1633, he accused the sons of Isa Khan Safavi planning to stage a coup against Safi and then usurp the throne. Safi then had them executed, including Isa Khan Safavi himself. Cheragh Khan was then given the qurchi-bashi post as a reward.

However, Cheragh Khan was one year later accused of hiding his empathy for the family of Isa Khan Safavi, and was executed in July 1632. He was succeeded by Amir Khan Zulqadr.

== Sources ==
- Matthee, Rudi (2011). Persia in Crisis: Safavid Decline and the Fall of Isfahan. I.B.Tauris. ISBN 978-0857731814.
- Babaie, Sussan (2004). Slaves of the Shah: New Elites of Safavid Iran. I.B.Tauris. pp. 1–218. ISBN 9781860647215.
- Savory, Roger M. (1991). "ČERĀḠ KHAN ZĀHEDĪ". Encyclopaedia Iranica, Vol. V, Fasc. 3. p. 263.

Preceded by Isa Khan Safavi	Qurchi-bashi; 1631-1632	Succeeded by Amir Khan Zulqadr
