= Aslamas Beg =

Safavid general and governor of Kandahar

Aslamas Beg (Georgian: ასლამაზ ორბელიანი), also known as Aslan Khan, was a Safavid official and military commander of Georgian origin. A scion of the Orbeliani family, Aslamas was the second son of Vakhushti Khan, the former governor of Shushtar.

He was appointed prefect (darugha) of Isfahan, the royal capital, in 1683. Known for being hostile to the Armenians, he issued a ban on non-Muslims leaving their houses and appearing in public in times of rain as they would otherwise taint believers. The ban was cancelled after the wealthy Armenian merchants of New Julfa (Isfahan's Armenian quarter) appealed to the queen mother, Nakihat Khanum. Aslamas Beg later served as the commander of the élite gholam corps (qollar-aghasi) in 1693–1695, and as the governor (beglarbeg) of Qandahar in 1694–1695, or 1696–1697.

Aslamas's son, Mohammad-Ali Khan, briefly served as commander of the artillery (tupchi-bashi) in 1722. Aslamas's namesake grandson, who died in 1740, later served as a beglarbeg of Georgia (Gorjestan) during the reign of Nader Shah (r. 1736-1747).

== Sources ==
- Floor, Willem (2001). Safavid Government Institutions. Costa Mesa, California: Mazda Publishers. pp. 171–174, 197. ISBN 978-1568591353.
- Floor, Willem M. (2008). Titles and Emoluments in Safavid Iran: A Third Manual of Safavid Administration, by Mirza Naqi Nasiri. Washington, DC: Mage Publishers. p. 257. ISBN 978-1933823232.
- Maeda, Hirotake (2003). "On the Ethno-Social Background of Four Gholām Families from Georgia in Safavid Iran". Studia Iranica (32): 249, 270.
- Matthee, Rudi (2019). "Confessions of an Armenian Convert: The I'tirafnama of Abkar ('Ali Akbar) Armani". In Khafipour, Hani (ed.). The Empires of the Near East and India Source Studies of the Safavid, Ottoman, and Mughal Literate Communities. Columbia University Press. p. 16. ISBN 978-0231174374.

Preceded by Isa Beg	Commander of the gholam corps (qollar-aghasi); 1693–1695	Succeeded by Musa Khan
Preceded by Mohammad-Ali Khan	Governor of Qandahar; 1694-1695, or 1696-1697	Succeeded by Kalb-Ali Khan
