= Safavid Kandahar =

Safavid Kandahar Velāyat-e Qandahar
- 1537–1538; 1545; 1558–1592; 1622–1638; 1649–1709
- Status: Province of Safavid Iran
- Capital: Kandahar
- Government: Province
Succeeded by
Hotaki dynasty

The province of Kandahar (Persian: ولایت قندهار, romanized: Velāyat-e Qandahar) was an eastern province of Safavid Iran centered around the city of Kandahar, and one of the four provinces of the Khorasan administrative region. It was composed of eight lower-ranking dependencies, Bost-Gereskh, Zamindavar, K.ri (Duki?), Y.ki (Chutiyali?), Garmsir-e Qandahar, Ghuriyan and the tribal district of the Hazaras, which included Qalat.

== List of governors ==
This is a list of the known figures who governed Kandahar. Beglerbeg, hakem and vali were all administrative titles designating the governor.

Date	Governor	Observations
1537–1538	Budaq Khan Qajar	Hakem of Kandahar
1538–1545	None	Ruled by the Mughal Empire
1545	Budaq Khan Qajar	Hakem of Kandahar. Second tenure
1545–1558	None	Ruled by the Mughal Empire
1558–1576	Hamzeh Beg Dhu'l-Qadr	Hakem of Kandahar
1576	Fulad Khalifeh-ye Shamlu	Hakem of Kandahar
1577–?	Hamzeh Beg Dhu'l-Qadr	Hakem of Kandahar. Second tenure
1587	Mozaffar Hoseyn Mirza	Hakem of Kandahar
1588	Qur Hamzeh	Hakem of Kandahar
1588	Rostam Mirza	Hakem of Kandahar
1589–1592	Mozaffar Hoseyn Mirza	Hakem of Kandahar. Second tenure
1592–1622	None	Ruled by the Mughal Empire
1622–1626	Ganj Ali Khan	Hakem of Kandahar
1626–1638	Ali Mardan Khan	Son of the previous governor. Hakem of Kandahar
1638–1649	None	Ruled by the Mughal Empire
1649	Mehrab Khan	Hakem of Kandahar and Astarabad
1649–1662/63	Otar Beg	Hakem of Kandahar
1662/63–?	Mansur Khan	Brother of the previous governor. Beglerbeg of Kandahar
?–1673	Jamshid Khan	
1673–?	Zal Khan	
1694–1695	Dervish Khan Soltan	Beglerbeg of Kandahar
1696	Mohammad Ali Khan	
1696, 1697	Aslamas Beg	Beglerbeg of Kandahar
1698	Kalb Ali Khan	Beglerbeg of Kandahar and vali of Astarabad
1698–1699	Abdollah Khan	Beglerbeg of Kandahar
1704–1709	Gorgin Khan	Beglerbeg of Kandahar and Kerman

== Sources ==
- Floor, Willem (2008). Titles and Emoluments in Safavid Iran: A Third Manual of Safavid Administration, by Mirza Naqi Nasiri. Washington, D.C.: Mage Publishers. ISBN 978-1933823232.
- Matthee, Rudi; Mashita, Hiroyuki (2010). "Kandahar iv. From The Mongol Invasion Through the Safavid Era". In Yarshater, Ehsan (ed.). Encyclopædia Iranica. Vol. XV/5: Ḵamsa of Jamāli–Karim Devona. London and New York: Routledge & Kegan Paul. pp. 478–484. ISBN 978-1-934283-28-8.
