= Jamshid Khan =

Jamshid Khan may refer to:

- Jamshid Khan (military commander)
- Jamshid Khan (cricketer)
- Jamshid Khan (politician)
