= Jamshid Khan (military commander) =

Safavid military commander (died 1667)

Governor of Semnan
- In office 1646–1656
- Preceded by: Manuchehr Beg
- Succeeded by: Geda Ali Beg Qajar

Governor of Astarabad
- In office 1656–1664
- Preceded by: Hajji Manuchehr Khan
- Succeeded by: Jafarqoli Khan

Governor of Qandahar
- In office <1665–Unknown
- Preceded by: Mansur Khan
- Succeeded by: Zal Khan

Personal details
- Died: 1667
- Parent: Hajji Manuchehr Khan

Military service
- Allegiance: Safavid Iran

Jamshid Khan was a 17th-century Safavid military commander and official. Of "unclear origins", he was the son of a certain Hajji Manuchehr Khan, a gholam and sometime governor of Shirvan and Astarabad. Jamshid Khan served as the commander of the élite gholam corps (qollar-aghasi) in 1663–1667. He also served as the governor (hakem) of Semnan in 1646–1656, of Astarabad (beglarbeg) in 1656–1664, and of Qandahar (beglarbeg) sometime after 1663. (Note: According to Willem Floor (2008), it is not entirely certain when Jamshid Khan's tenure as governor of Astarabad ended; it could have stretched up to 1666.)

Especially due to the high office of qollar-aghasi, Jamshid Khan yielded considerable influence in the Safavid state which was evident by the later tenure of grand vizier Mirza Mohammad Karaki (1661-1691), when the latter's power trailed that of Jamshid Khan. He died in 1667.

== Sources ==
- Floor, Willem M. (2008). Titles and Emoluments in Safavid Iran: A Third Manual of Safavid Administration, by Mirza Naqi Nasiri. Washington, DC: Mage Publishers. pp. 153, 275. ISBN 978-1933823232.
- Floor, Willem; Javadi, Hasan (2013). "The Role of Azerbaijani Turkish in Safavid Iran". Iranian Studies. 46 (4): 569–581. doi:10.1080/00210862.2013.784516. S2CID 161700244.
- Matthee, Rudi; Mashita, Hiroyuki (2010). "KANDAHAR iv. From The Mongol Invasion Through the Safavid Era". Encyclopaedia Iranica, Vol. XV, Fasc. 5. pp. 478–484.
- Matthee, Rudi (2012). Persia in Crisis: Safavid Decline and the Fall of Isfahan. I.B.Tauris. pp. 53, 126, 161–162. ISBN 978-1845117450.
- Newman, Andrew J. (2008). Safavid Iran: Rebirth of a Persian Empire. I.B.Tauris. pp. 1–296. ISBN 978-0857716613.

Preceded by Allahverdi Khan	Commander of the gholam corps (qollar-aghasi); 1632–1655	Succeeded by Kaykhosrow Khan
Preceded by Manuchehr Beg	Governor of Semnan; 1646–1656	Succeeded by Geda Ali Beg Qajar
Preceded by Hajji Manuchehr Khan	Governor of Astarabad; 1656–1664-?	Succeeded by Jafarqoli Khan
Preceded by Mansur Khan	Governor of Qandahar after 1663	Succeeded by Zal Khan
