= Abdal Beg Talish =

Qizilbash leader

Qurchi-bashi (Head of the Royal Bodyguard)
- In office 1506–1507
- Monarch: Ismail I
- Preceded by: Office established
- Succeeded by: Yakan Beg Tekelu

Personal details
- Died: After 1513

Abdal Beg Talish (Persian: ابدال بیگ تالش), also known as Dada Beg Talish (Persian: ده‌ده‌بیگ تالش), was a Qizilbash leader (emir) of Talysh origin, who served the Safaviyya order, and later the dynasty established by the order, the Safavid dynasty. The date of his death is unknown; he disappears from records after 1513.

== See also ==
- Khadem Beg Talish

== Sources ==
- Al-i Davud, Seyyed Ali [in Persian]; Gholami, Rahim (2008). "Abdāl Beg". In Madelung, Wilferd; Daftary, Farhad (eds.). Encyclopaedia Islamica Online. Brill Online. ISSN 1875-9831.
- Glassen, E. [in German] (1982). "ABDĀL BEG". In Yarshater, Ehsan (ed.). Encyclopædia Iranica. Vol. I/2. London: Routledge & Kegan Paul. pp. 174–175. ISBN 0-710090-91-9.
- Nasiri, Mirza Naqi (2008). Floor, Willem (ed.). Titles & Emoluments in Safavid Iran: A Third Manual of Safavid Administration. Translated by Willem Floor. Washington, D.C.: Mage Publishers. ISBN 1-933823-23-2.
- Reid, James J. (1983). Tribalism and Society in Islamic Iran, 1500–1629. Malibu, California: Undena Publications. ISBN 0-890031-25-8.
- Savory, Roger (1980). Iran Under the Safavids. Cambridge: Cambridge University Press. ISBN 0-521224-83-7.

Military offices
New title	Qurchi-bashi; 1506–1509	Succeeded by Yakan Beg Tekkelu
Political offices
Preceded by ?	Governor of Qazvin, Ray, Savojbolagh and Khvar ?–1509	Succeeded by I Zeynal xan Şamlı
Shaybanids rule	Governor of Merv; 1510–1513	Succeeded by Div Sultan Rumlu
