= Evaz Beg =

Evaz Beg (also spelled Ivaz) was a 17th-century Safavid official and royal gholam of Georgian origin, he served during the reign of Abbas II (1632–1666), and was the brother of one of the most prominent court eunuchs at the time, Mehtar Davud, as well as of the imperial treasurer and eunuch Mohammad Beg. In 1640, Evaz Beg was appointed governor (vizier) of Lar. A few years later, in 1646–1647, he was briefly made governor (hakem) of the nearby district of Bandar Abbas, which included the islands of Hormuz, Qeshm and Larek. In 1656, he was permitted to resign as governor of Lar and was appointed as divanbegi (chancellor, chief justice), while a few years later, in 1660, he was made governor (vizier) of Bia-pas in Gilan and its provincial capital Rasht.

Evaz Beg's descendants would hold the government of Lar (and later also that of Bandar Abbas) for many more years to come, until 1725. During this lengthy period, he and his family dominated the politics of the Persian Gulf littoral.

== Sources ==
- Floor, Willem M. (2006). The Persian Gulf: A Political and Economic History of Five Port Cities, 1500-1730. Mage Publishers. ISBN 978-1933823126.
- Floor, Willem M.; Faghfoory, Mohammad H. (2007). The Dastur Al-moluk: A Safavid State Manual, by Mohammad Rafi' al-Din Ansari. Mazda Publishers. ISBN 978-1568591957.
- Floor, Willem M. (2008). Titles and Emoluments in Safavid Iran: A Third Manual of Safavid Administration, by Mirza Naqi Nasiri. Washington, DC: Mage Publishers. pp. 230–232. ISBN 978-1933823232.
- Matthee, Rudi (2012). Persia in Crisis: Safavid Decline and the Fall of Isfahan. I.B.Tauris. ISBN 978-1845117450.

| Preceded by Fulad Beg | Governor of Lar; 1639–1656 | Succeeded by Allahverdi Beg |
| Preceded by Safiqoli Khan Qolkhanchi-oghlu | Governor of Bandar Abbas; 1646–1647 | Succeeded by Saru Khan Soltan |
| Preceded by Mirza Sadr-ed-din Mohammad Jaberi | Governor of Bia-pas; 1660–1664 | Succeeded by Mirza Mohammad Karim (son of Adam Soltan) |
