= List of Qurchi-bashis =

Head of Safavid royal bodyguards

The Qurchi-bashi (Persian: قورچی‌باشی‌), also spelled Qorchi-bashi (قرچی‌باشی‌), was the head of the qurchis, the royal bodyguard of the Safavid shah. There were also qurch-bashis who were stationed in some of the provinces and cities. They were all, however, subordinate to the supreme qurchi-bashi, listed in this article.

== List of Qurchi-bashis ==
=== Reign of Ismail I ===
- Abdal Beg Talish (1506–1507)
- Yakan Beg Tekkelu (1509–1510)
- Saru-Pireh Ustajlu (1512)
- Montasha Soltan Ustajlu (1513)
- Yarash Beg Ustajlu (1514)
- Ali Soltan Chichkelu (1518)

=== Reign of Tahmasp I ===
- Nadhr Beg (1524)
- Bakr Beg Ustajlu (1526–1527)
- Tatar-oghli Tekkelu (1528–1529)
- Duraq Beg Tekkelu (1529–1530)
- Dura Beg - or Dedeh Beg (1531)
- Parvaneh Beg Tekkelu (1531)
- Khalifeh Mohammad Shamlu (1533–1534)
- Ughlan Khalifeh Shamlu (1534)
- Shir Hasan (Dhu'l-Qadr?; 1534)
- Sevenduk Beg Afshar (1534–1562)
- ?
- Ahmad Beg Afshar (1574)
- Yusefqoli Soltan Afshar (1576–1577)
- Qoli Beg Afshar (1576–1577)

=== Reign of Ismail II ===
- Yusefqoli Soltan Afshar (1576–1577)
- Qoli Beg Afshar (1576–1577)
- Eskandar Beg Afshar (1577)
- Qoli Beg Afshar (1577)
- Tahmaspqoli Soltan Afshar (1577)
- Kachal Mostafa Afshar (1577)

=== Reign of Mohammad Khodabanda ===
- Esmailqoli khan (1584)

=== Reign of Abbas I ===
- Yusef Khan, son of Qoli Beg Afshar (1587–1588)
- Badr Beg Afshar (1587–1588)
- Vali Khan Afshar (1588–1589)
- Allahqoli Beg Qapameh-oghli Qajar (1591–1612)
- Isa Khan Safavi (1612–1631)

=== Reign of Safi ===
- Isa Khan Safavi (1612–1631)
- Cheragh Khan Zahedi (1631–1632)
- Emir Khan Soklan Dhu'l-Qadr (1632–1638)
- Jani Beg Khan Shamlu (1638–1645)

=== Reign of Abbas II ===
- Jani Beg Khan Shamlu (1638–1645)
- Mortezaqoli Khan Begdeli Shamlu (1645–1648)
- Mortezaqoli Khan Qajar (1648–1663)

=== Reign of Suleiman I ===
- Kalb 'Ali Khan (1668–1682)
- Saru Khan Sahandlu (1682–1691)
- Shahqoli Khan Zanganeh (1691–1699)

=== Reign of Soltan Hoseyn ===
- Mortezaqoli Khan Bijerlu (1698–1699)
- Shahqoli Khan Zanganeh (?–1707)
- Jafarqoli Khan Hatemi (171?)
- Mohammad Zaman Khan Shamlu (1711)
- Safiqoli Khan (1715)
- Mohammadqoli Khan Shamlu (1716–1720)
- Aliqoli Khan Zanganeh (1720–1721)
- Shaykh Ali Khan Zanganeh (1721)
- Mostafaqoli Khan Sa'adlu (1721)
- Farajollah Khan Abdollu (1721)
- Mohammad Khan Abdollu (1721)

=== Reign of Tahmasp II ===
- Nader Qoli Beg (1726–1730)
- Mohammad Reza Khan Abdollu (1730–1733)

=== Reign of Abbas III ===
- Mohammad Reza Khan Abdollu (1730–1733)
- Qasem Beg Qajar (1733–1736)

== Sources ==
- Floor, Willem (2001). Safavid Government Institutions. Costa Mesa, California: Mazda Publishers. pp. 140–149. ISBN 978-1568591353.
- Haneda, Masashi (1989). The Evolution of the Safavid Royal Guard. Vol. 22. Journal of Near Eastern Studies, vol. 22, no. 2/3. pp. 57–85. doi:10.1080/00210868908701731. ISBN 0857731815. JSTOR 4310668.
- Michael Axworthy, The Sword of Persia: Nader Shah, from Tribal Warrior to Conquering Tyrant Hardcover 348 pages (26 July 2006) Publisher: I.B. Tauris Language: English ISBN 1-85043-706-8
- Floor, Willem M. (1998). A Fiscal History of Iran in the Safavid and Qajar Periods, 1500-1925. Bibliotheca Persica Press. pp. 1–573. ISBN 9780933273290.
