= Ivane Jambakurian-Orbeliani =

General, nobleman Ivane Jambakurian-Orbeliani
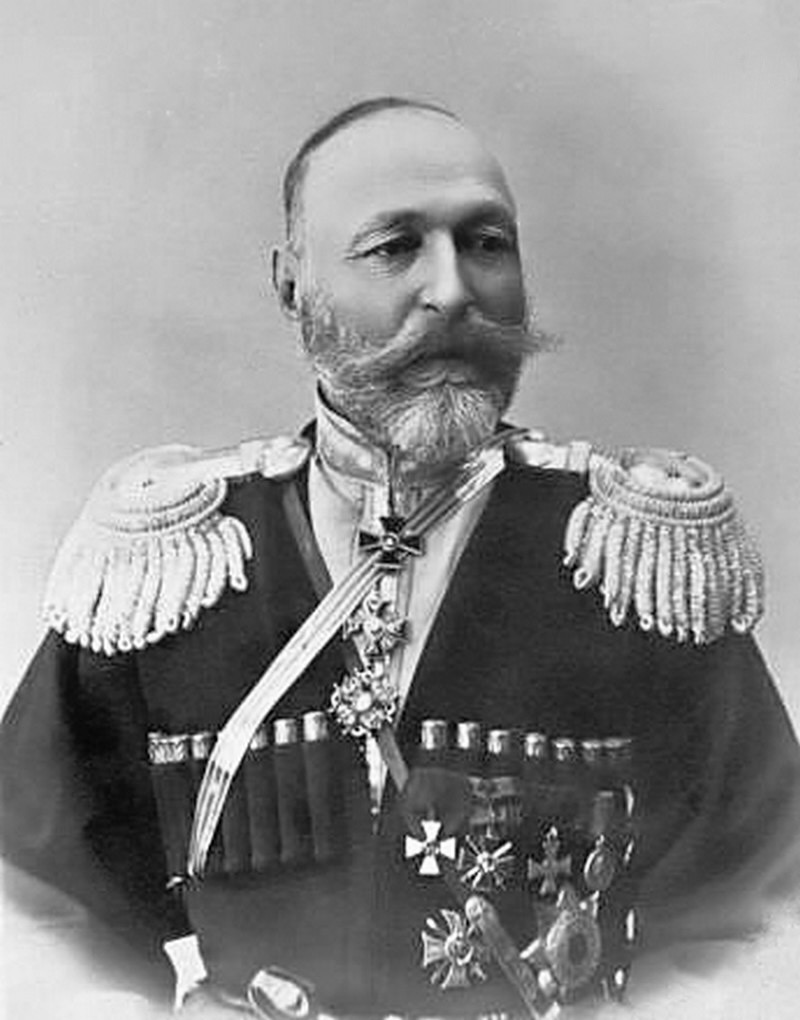
- Born: 9 September 1844
- Died: 13 November 1919
- Burial place: Mtskheta, Democratic Republic of Georgia (present-day Georgia)
- Military career
- Allegiance: Russia
- Branch: Imperial Russian Army
- Service years: 1860–1906
- Rank: General of the cavalry
- Units: Cavalry, mixed
- Commands: 2nd Cossack Division; 22nd Russian Army Corps; 18th Russian Army Corps
- Conflicts: Caucasian War; Russo-Turkish War

Prince Ivane Jambakurian-Orbeliani (Georgian: ივანე მამუკას ძე ორბელიანი, romanized: Ivane Mamukas dze Orbeliani; Russian: Ива́н Мака́рович Орбелиа́ни; 9 September 1844 – 13 November 1919) was a Georgian prince who served as Russian Imperial general and governor of Kutaisi in western Georgia.

== Biography ==
He was born as a member of one of the most important princely families of Georgia, the House of Orbeliani. His parents were Prince Mamuka Tomazovich Orbeliani and Princess Ketevan Eristavi of Ksani. His family originated from Georgia, then part of the Russian Empire.

He was in the army since the 1860s. His first success was shown in the battles with the mountaineers and later he also took part in the Russian-Turkish war (1877–1878). As a lieutenant he fought in the Caucasus, by 1883 he was already a colonel and six years later a major-general.

He was also the commander of the:

- Caucasian Military District (1892–1895)
- 2nd Brigade of the 2nd Caucasian Cossack Division (1895–1896)
- Terek Cossack Division (1896–1897)
- 2nd Brigade Terek Cossack (1897–1899)

He was promoted to lieutenant general in January 1901 and took command of the 2nd Cossack Division. In 1905 he was acting commander of the 22nd and 18th Russian Army Corps. Due to illness, Ivane Orbeliani retired from service in 1906 with the rank General of the cavalry.

== Family and descendants ==
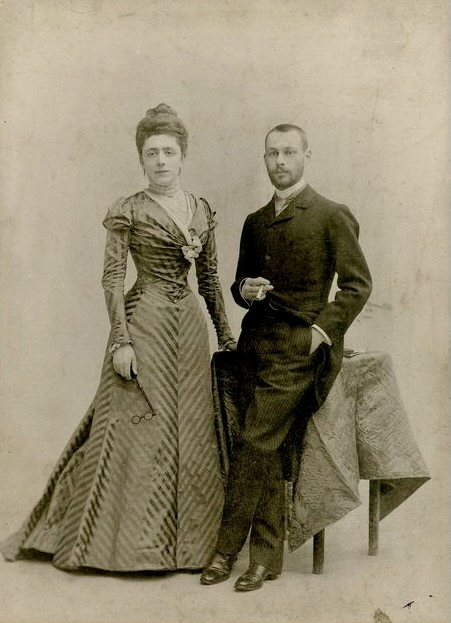
Ivane's eldest son, Makar, with his wife, Elizabeth Bagrationi.

In Tiflis in 1872, he married his cousin Princess Maria Dmitrievna Svyatopolk-Mirsky (1856–1899), daughter of the Russian General Prince Dmitry Ivanovich Svyatopolk-Mirsky and his wife, Princess Sophia Yakovlevna Orbeliani (30 May 1825 – 9 June 1898). They had three children:

- Prince Makar Orbeliani (1873 - 1924). In 1898, he married Princess Elizabeth of the Bagration dynasty (27 October 1870 - 25 November 1942), the daughter of Prince Irakli Gruzinsky (1826–1882) and Princess Tamar Chavchavadze (1852–1933).
- Princess Sonia Orbeliani (1875, St.Petersburg (1915), Palace Tsarskoe Selo). She never married, but dedicated herself to the Russian court. She was one of the Maids-of-Honor of the "Imperial Bedchamber to Her Majesty", the highest rank for the hundreds of women who held the position at Court. She was a close friend of Tsarina Alexandra Feodorovna (Alix of Hesse). She died of a progressive spinal disease.
- Prince Dmitry Orbeliani (1875, Mir, Belarus - 1922, London). A personal assistant of the Grand Duke Alexander Mikhailovich of Russia. Dmitry married (1900 in St. Petersburg) Countess Vera von Kleinmichel (1877, St. Petersburg - 1948, Malta). They had an only daughter Princess Galena Dmitrievna Orbeliani (b. 5 May 1922), who was born soon after her father's death.

Prince Ivane died in 1919 and was buried in Svetitskhoveli Cathedral in Mtskheta, Georgia.
