= Defensive walls in Safavid Iran =

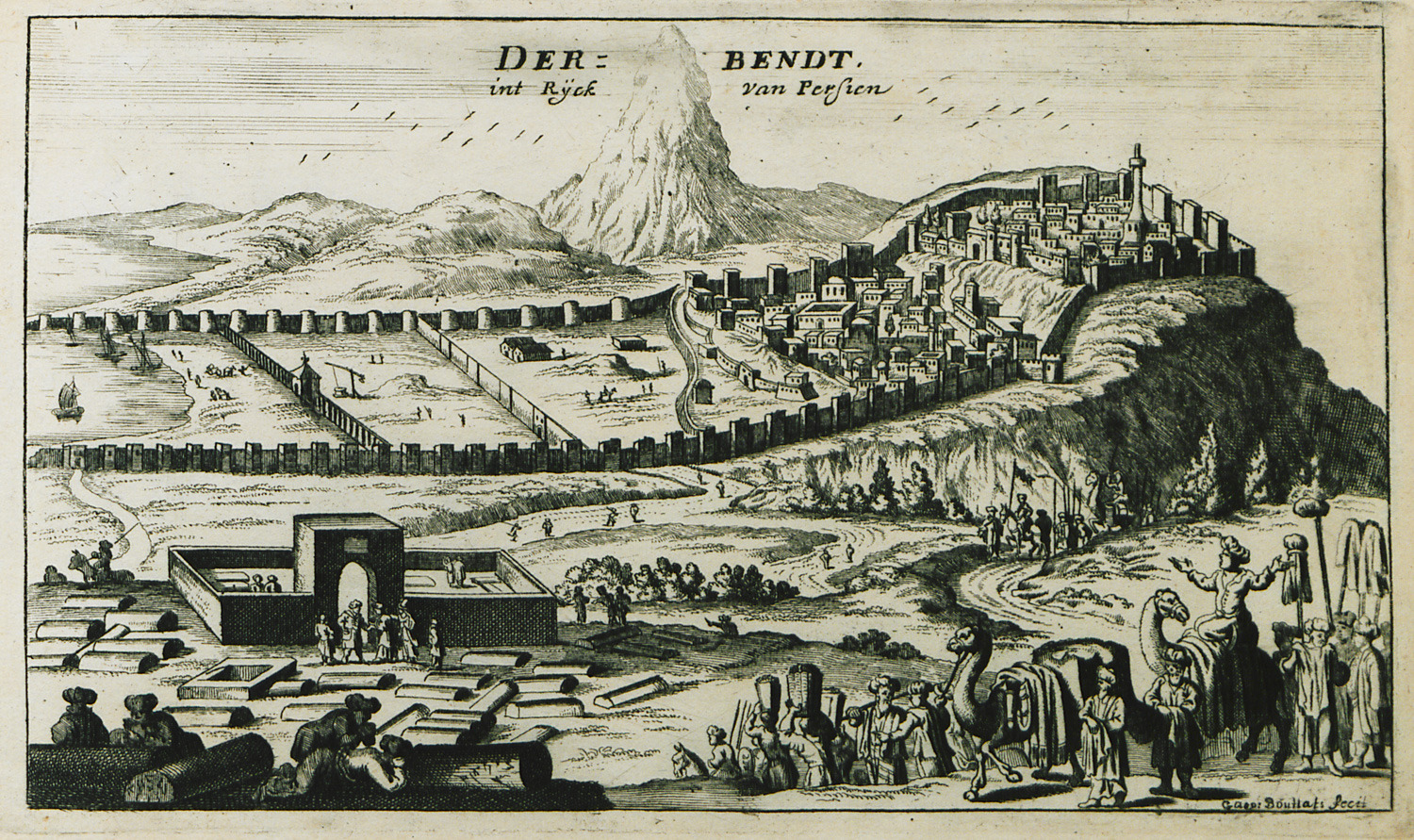
Illustration entitled Derbendt int rÿck van Persien ("Derbent in the Persian Empire"). Published by Jacob Peeters in 1690

Defensive walls in Safavid Iran were few in number, a development which can be traced back in dialectical fashion to the low appreciation of artillery by the Iranian army in contemporaneous times and the concept and execution of city construction—the latter being itself a reflection of the physical characteristics of Safavid Iran coupled with the workings of historical contingency. In Safavid Iran, rather than walls, it was usually the citadel within the urban area that functioned as the city's stronghold and the refuge for stationed forces and some of the city's population.

The Safavid period was seemingly a period wherein the number of towns surrounded by walls and fortifications decreased gradually. Responsible for this, the historian Rudi Matthee explains, was a lack of repair due to, in part, absence of a centrally organised defence policy, and a weakly developed municipal organisation, and in some cases a deliberate "decastellation". For instance, Shah Abbas the Great (r. 1588-1629), in his efforts to centralise Iran and establish strong rule, destroyed many fortifications within the country that had been used by local rulers. The existing notion that the Ottomans wanted to attack heavily fortified towns and cities also seemingly inspired the Safavids to destroy some fortifications which were not used as frontier outposts.

== Types, locations and context ==
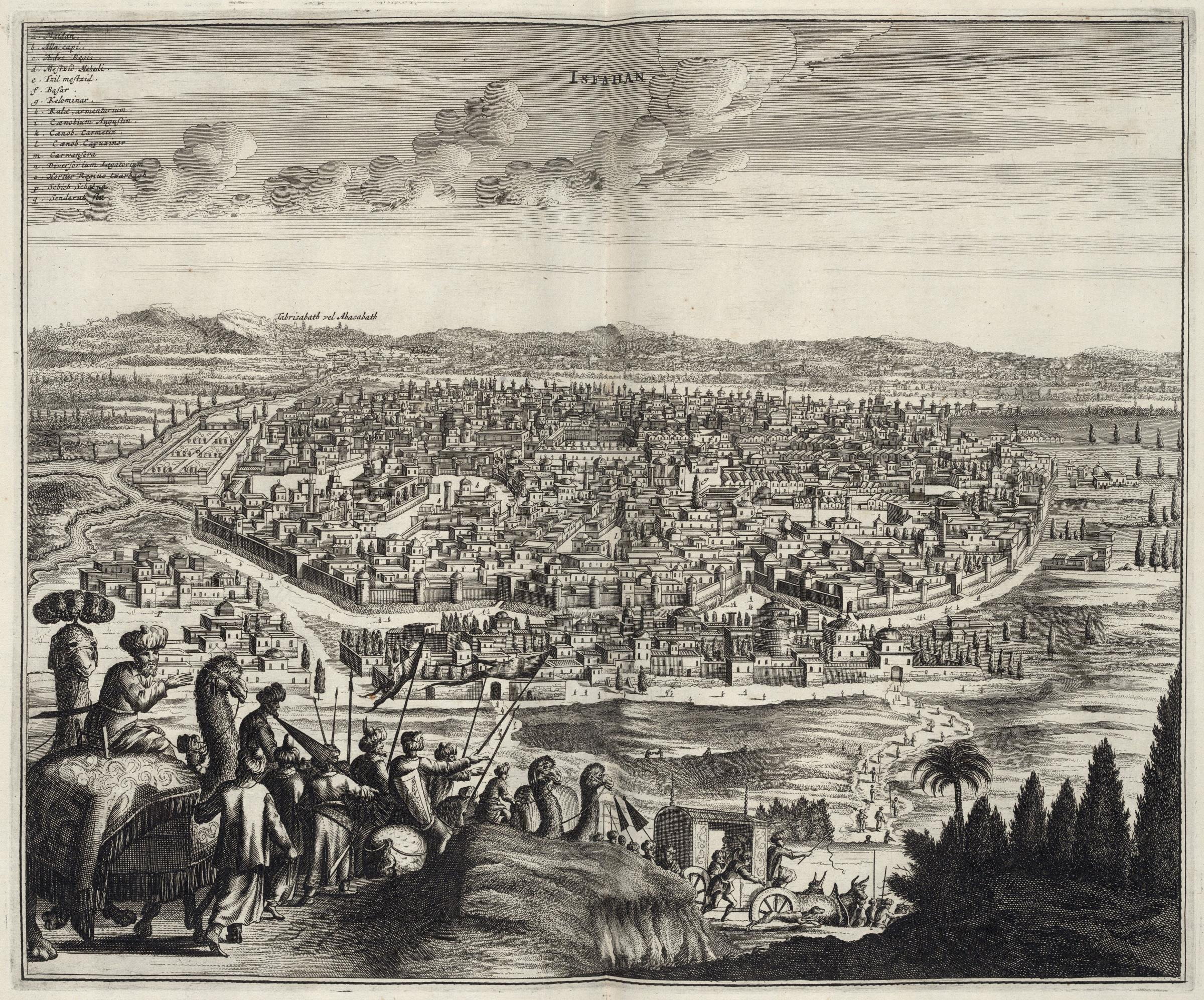
Isfahan as drawn by Jacob van Meurs, c. 1672

Reports on walls in Safavid Iran are less than comprehensive due to conflicting and ambiguous reports. Furthermore, matters are complicated due to different purposes served by walls. The term "wall", as historian Rudi Matthee explains, is flexible, and ranges in meaning from fortified ramparts to feeble clay enclosures of urban quarters of gardens and plots of agricultural land. A further problem is the distinction between common walls (ḥiṣār), surrounding cities, and fortresses (qal'eh), within urban areas, which is not always clear from the extant data. Fortified towns were especially located in areas that bordered empires whose military often used artillery. Towns that fit this criterion are the northern frontier town of Derbent (Darband) as well as Kandahar in the east near the border with the Mughal Empire. The existence of fortified villages in Safavid Iran is also undisputable.

Many European travellers who visited eastern towns, noted that unlike European cities, they were often unwalled—a feature also encountered in Safavid Iran. However, a number of Iranian towns were already walled prior to the rise of the Safavid dynasty, with some cities undergoing little or no change in over 200 years of rule by the Safavids. Cities in Safavid Iran that fit this category are Derbent in the north, as well as Herat and Kandahar in the east. Although extant information on Mashhad's fortifications is limited, its high and strong walls that surrounded the city in the late 17th century may have been constructed in the early 1500s.

The rule of Shah Abbas the Great which was also characterized by attendant relatively stability provided the Iranians with strategic depth and made fortifications of cities in central Iran less and less important. Thereby, in this regard, the Safavids started to resemble the Roman Empire and the Achaemenid Empire of ancient times, who were likewise noted for focussing on the defense on the border areas of their realms.

In 1675, Shah Suleiman I (r. 1666-1694) built a wall around Tbilisi (Tiflis).

As few of Safavid Iran's enemies used firearms, with even fewer making use of them effectively, the Safavids were even less poised to maintain and create defensive walls around their cities. This was especially the case in the eastern part of the Safavid realm, where firearms were adopted only late in history, and its nomads who attacked Safavid Khorasan continued to use traditional weapons for a long period of time. Although Afghan tribes, who would play a foremost role in dealing the final blow to the declining Safavid rulers, used firearms, they, like the Safavids, were remarkably weak in using them effectively in siege warfare.

== Iranian cities and walls, 15th-17th centuries ==
A selection of cities and the existence of walls, per Matthee:

City	Late 15th	Early 16th	Late 16th	Early 17th	Later 17th
Tabriz	Yes (dismal looking)	Yes/No	-	-	Yes/No
Shamakhi	-	-	Yes	Partly ruined	Partly ruined
Derbent	Yes	Yes	-	-	Yes
Ardabil	-	-	-	No	-
Rasht	-	-	-	-	No
Farahabad	-	-	-	No	-
Zanjan	-	-	-	No	-
Tehran	-	-	-	Yes	-
Qazvin	-	-	-	No	Ruined
Saveh	-	-	-	-	Badly maintained
Qom	Yes	-	-	No	Ruined
Kashan	Yes	Yes	Yes (weak)	-	Partly ruined
Isfahan	-	Yes	Yes (weak)	-	Yes (weak)
Shiraz	-	(Partial)	-	No	No
Yazd	Yes	-	-	-	-
Lar	-	Yes	-	No	No
Mashhad	Yes	-	-	-	Yes
Herat	Yes	-	-	-	-
Balkh	-	Yes	-	-	-
Kandahar	-	Yes	-	Yes	-

== Assessment ==
The Safavid rulers did not face the Ottoman dilemma of being forced to adapt new forms of warfare based on European model, nor the Tsardom of Russia's acute need to restructure its army and defensive strategies due to the outbreak of the Smolensk War in the 1630s. While the Ottomans were forced to adapt the European way of warfare and the Russians fully integrated firearms into its system, in Safavid Iran, as Matthee explains: "The interplay between political, social and material factors made a similar revolution unnecessary and therefore perhaps impossible. The reasons for this had as much to do with the Safavids as with their enemies. Iran's "military revolution" remained half-finished; it buttressed the absolutism of Shah Abbas I and his successors, but failed to effect a profound transformation in the Safavid political and social structure". Hence defensive walls never became a mainstay in relation to Safavid policies on the construction of cities and towns, and artillery and firearms never became core parts of the Safavid army.

== Sources ==
- Matthee, Rudi (1996). "Unwalled Cities and Restless Nomads: Firearms and Artillery in Safavid Iran". In Melville, Charles (ed.). Safavid Persia: The History and Politics of an Islamic Society. I.B. Tauris & Co Ltd.
- Rayfield, Donald (2012). Edge of Empires: A History of Georgia. Reaktion Books.
