= List of Qollar-aghasis =

Commanders of Safavid gholam corps

The Qollar-aghasi (Azerbaijani: قوللرآغاسی‌, lit. 'Lord of Slaves'), also spelled Qullar-aqasi, was the commander of the Safavid Empire's élite gholam (also spelled ghulam) corps. The word means lord of slaves in Azeri (qullar means 'slaves' and ağası means 'lord of'). The holder of the office was one of the most powerful individuals in the entire Safavid state, and in fact by the end of the Safavid-era, he was the most important military official after the qurchi-bashi.

== List of Qollar-aghasis ==
=== Reign of Abbas I ===
- Yulqoli Beg (1590)
- Allahverdi Khan (1591)
- Qarachaqay Khan (1617–1624)
- Khosrow Mirza (Note: Later known as Rostam/Rostom Khan.) (1629–1632)

=== Reign of Safi ===
- Khosrow Mirza (Note: Later known as Rostam/Rostom Khan.) (1629–1632)
- Siyavosh Beg (1632–1655)

=== Reign of Abbas II ===
- Siyavosh Beg (1632–1655)
- Allahverdi Khan (1655–1663)
- Jamshid Khan (1663–1667)

=== Reign of Suleiman I ===
- Jamshid Khan (1663–1667)
- Kaykhosrow Khan (prior to 1693)
- Mansur Khan (prior to 1693)
- Isa Beg (1693)
- Aslamas Beg (1693–1695)

=== Reign of Soltan Hoseyn ===
- Aslamas Beg (1693–1695)
- Musa Khan (1701)
- Fath-Ali Khan Daghestani (?–1715)
- Safiqoli Khan (1715–1717)
- Rostam Khan (1717–1722)
- Ahmad Agha (1722) (Note: He was the deputy qollar-aghasi.)
- Bakar Mirza (Shahnavaz) (1722)

=== Reign of Tahmasp II ===
- Mohammad Ali Khan (1724)
- Mohammad Mo'men Beg (1730–1732)

=== Reign of Abbas III ===
- Mohammad Mo'men Beg (1730–1732)
- Rezaqoli Khan (1733)
- Mohammad-Ali (1734–1736)

== Sources ==
- Floor, Willem (2001). Safavid Government Institutions. Costa Mesa, California: Mazda Publishers. pp. 171–174. ISBN 978-1568591353.
- Floor, Willem M. (2008). Titles and Emoluments in Safavid Iran: A Third Manual of Safavid Administration, by Mirza Naqi Nasiri. Washington, DC: Mage Publishers. p. 308. ISBN 978-1933823232.
- Haneda, M. (1986). "ARMY iii. Safavid Period". Encyclopaedia Iranica, Vol. II, Fasc. 5. pp. 503–506.
