= 2nd Caucasus Cossack Division =

- Active: 1914
- Allegiance: Russian Empire
- Branch: Imperial Russian Army

The 2nd Caucasus Cossack Division was a Cossack Division of the Imperial Russian Army before and during World War I.

== Commanders ==
- 1879–1881: Ivane Amilakhvari
- 1903: Ivan Makarovich Orbeliani
- 1906–1907: Maksud Alihhanov-Avarski
- 1910–1912: Sergey N Fleisher
- 1912–1916: Dmitry Abatsiyev

== Chiefs of Staff ==
- 1904–1907: NI Arapov
- 1907–1909: Vladimirov
- 1909–1915: Jewgienij Lebiedinski
- 1915–1916: Pavel Chatilov
- 1916–1917: Sergey Markov
