= Sonia Orbeliani =

Russian princess and courtier (1875–1915)

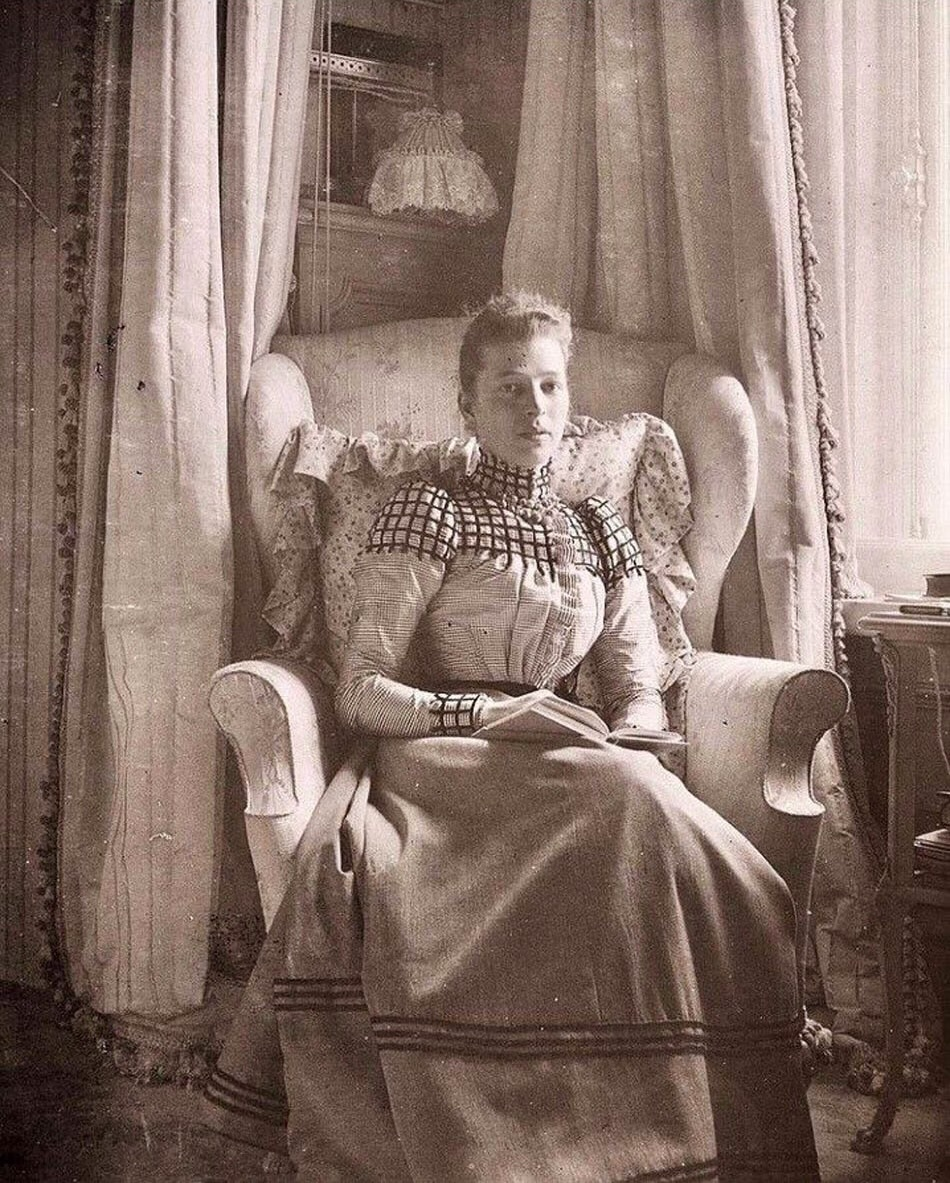
Princess Sonia Orbeliani in the Mauve Room of the Alexander Palace, before 1915.

Sonia Orbeliani (1875–1915) was a Georgian princess and courtier in Imperial Russia. From 1898 until 1915, she was a lady-in-waiting to the Russian empress Alexandra Feodorovna, with whom she enjoyed a very close relationship.

== Biography ==
Born into the Georgian House of Orbeliani, Sophia was the middle child and the only daughter of Prince Ivane Jambakurian-Orbeliani, general and governor of Kutaisi, and Princess Maria Svyatopolk-Mirska (1855–1889). Her brothers were Prince Mamuka Ivanovich Orbeliani (1873–1924) and Prince Dmitry Ivanovich Orbeliani (1873–1922), who served as personal assistant of the Grand Duke Alexander Mikhailovich of Russia. She was the niece of Prince Pyotr Sviatopolk-Mirsky.

Orbeliani was given a typical education for an aristocratic woman of the time with a focus on accomplishments, and described as a confident, amusing blonde and as an able pianist, painter, dancer and singer. Because of her extrovert nature and charm, she was thought to be able to make the introvert and reserved empress to participate more in social life, and she arranged small gatherings of noblewomen where she and the empress played the piano, in an unsuccessful attempt to make Alexandra more sociable. She was a personal friend of Alexandra Feodorovna and was able to criticize her without offending the empress. The Okhrana secret police described her as passionate, vulgar and with an intense loyalty to Alexandra.

In 1903, she was affected by a spinal illness, and given a diagnosis in which she was to become gradually paralyzed and finally die. Uncommonly, she continued as lady-in-waiting; first as before, eventually only tending to secretarial tasks and finally confined to bed, nursed by the empress. Princess Sonia Orbeliani died in the Imperial palace in 1915.
