= List of Tupchi-bashis =

Commanders of Safavid artillery corps

The Tupchi-bashi (Persian: توپچی‌باشی, lit. 'head of the tupchis') was the commander of the Safavid Empire's artillery corps. He was responsible for the artillery battery (tup-khaneh) and needed materials in relation to the artillery pieces as well. The tupchi-bashi received assistance by an administrative staff, as well as by various officers of lower rank. The term tupchi-bashi was also used to designate the commanders of local artillery batteries in the various cities and provinces of the empire.

== List of Tupchi-bashis ==
=== Reign of Ismail I ===
- Hamza Beg (1507)
- Mahmud Beg (1516)

=== Reign of Tahmasp I ===
- Ostad Sheikhi Beg (1528–1529)
- Sheikh Ali (1538–1539)
- Darvish Beg (1551–1552)
- Soleiman Beg (1556–1557)

=== Reign of Mohammad Khodabanda ===
- Morad Khan (1580–1581)

=== Reign of Abbas I ===
- Qoreiqchi Khan (1605–1606) (Note: A gholam, he started his career in the qeichigari ("tailors workshop") and rose to further importance from there.)
- Barkhordar Beg (1610)

=== Reign of Safi ===
- Mortezaqoli Beg (1637–1638) (Note: Son of Barkhordar Beg.)
- Morad Beg (1642)

=== Reign of Abbas II ===
- Morad Beg (1642)
- Mohammad Beg (1649)
- Hoseinqoli Khan (1655) (Note: After Hoseinqoli Khan died in 1655, Abbas II did not appoint a new tupchi-bashi. The jabbehdar-bashi ("head of the royal arsenal") took over its role temporarily until 1660-1661. Floor mentions that the post may have become vacant afterwards.)
- Qalandar Soltan Chuleh Chaghatay (1660–1661) (Note: The actual role of tupchi-bashi was still performed by the jabbehdar-bashi during these years. However, Qalandar Soltan Chuleh did keep command over the artillery and its related logistics at Qandahar.)

=== Reign of Suleiman I ===
- Najafqoli Beg (1669–1679) (Note: He was also rekabdar.)
- Mohammad Hosein Beg (1679–?)
- Musa Beg (1692)
- Abd ol-Razzaq Beg (1693–1695)

=== Reign of Soltan Hoseyn ===
- Abd ol-Razzaq Beg (1693–1695)
- Abdi Aqa (1697–1698)
- Aliqoli Khan (1711–1714)
- Mohebb-Ali Khan (1716–1721) (Note: Died at Gulnabad in 1722.)
- Ahmad Khan (1721)
- Mohammad-Ali Khan (1722) (Note: He was the son of Aslamas Beg.)
- His son (1722) (Note: After Mohammad-Ali Khan was dismissed on 14 June 1722, he was succeeded by his seven year old son.)

=== Reign of Tahmasp II ===
- Emin Khan (1728–1729)
- Taher Beg (1730–1731)
- Mohammadqoli Khan (1731–1732)
- Yar Beg Khan (1732)

=== Reign of Abbas III ===
- Yar Beg Khan (1732)
- Mehdi Khan (1733)

== Sources ==
- Floor, Willem (2001). Safavid Government Institutions. Costa Mesa, California: Mazda Publishers. pp. 188–199. ISBN 978-1568591353.
- Mikaberidze, Alexander (2015). Historical Dictionary of Georgia (2 ed.). Rowman & Littlefield. p. 362. ISBN 978-1442241466.
- Savory, Roger (2007). Iran Under the Safavids. Cambridge: Cambridge University Press. pp. 59, 92. ISBN 978-0521042512.
