= Siyavosh Beg =

Safavid military commander, official and gholam

Qollar-aghasi (Commander of gholam corps)
- In office 1632–1655
- Monarchs: Safi I (r. 1629–1642); Abbas II (r. 1642–1666)
- Preceded by: Khosrow Mirza
- Succeeded by: Allahverdi Khan

Governor of Kuhgiluyeh
- In office 1645–1649

Personal details
- Died: c. 1650/51 or 1655

Siyavosh Beg, (Note: Alternatively spelled Siyavush, or mentioned with the title of "Khan" instead of "Beg".) also known by his nisba of Bāshīāchūghī (died c. 1650/51 or 1655), was a Safavid military commander, official, and gholam of Georgian origin.

Siyavosh Beg rose through the ranks to become a military officer (yuzbashi) early on in his career. In 1632, he was appointed as the new governor (hakem) of Derbent and as commander of the élite gholam corps (qollar-aghasi), succeeding Khosrow Mirza (later Rostam Khan of Kartli) to this post. He remained commander of the corps for a lengthy period.

== Career ==
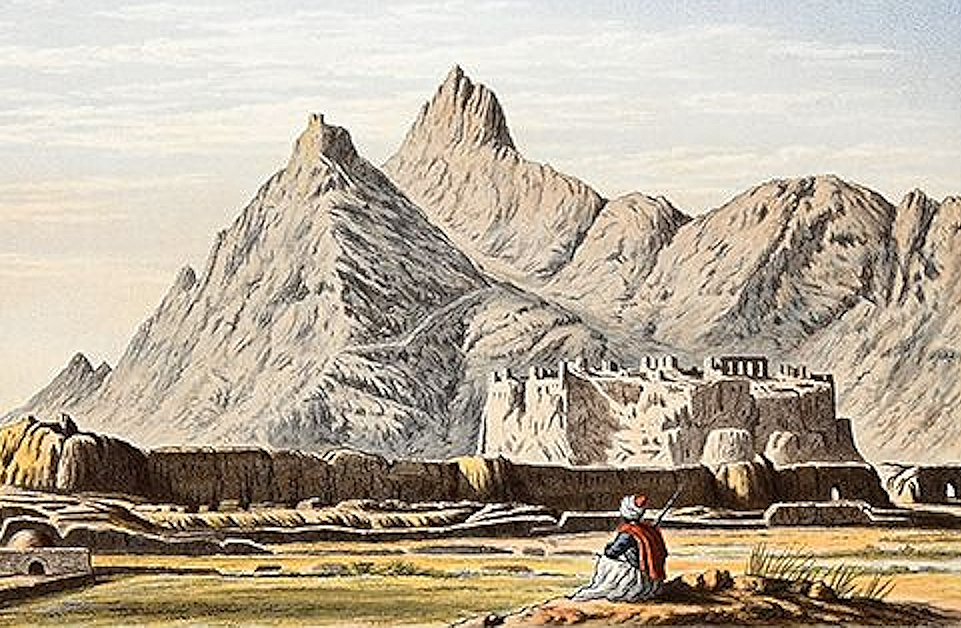
View of the fortress of Old Kandahar

In 1638, Siyavush Qullar-aqasi led an army from Mashhad to Kandahar, in an attempt to counter the Mughals from capturing the region. Following the Surrender of Kandahar (1638) by the Safavid governor Ali Mardan Khan, the Mughal court promoted Qilich Khan Turani, who had been the governor of Multan, to the post of Governor of Kandahar and defender of the fortress. More troops, from Multan, Bukkur and Seistan were ordered to reinforce Kandahar, in preparation of a confrontation with the Safavid troops of Siyavush Qullar-aqasi. Prince Shah Shuja was sent with an additional 20,000 cavalrymen. On April 2, Sa‘id Khan arrived at the outskirts of the Kandahar fortress and was welcomed by Alimardan Khan. He was ordered to ready himself to confront the Safavid troops of Siyavush in the open if they chose to move towards Kandahar, while Qilich Khan was stationed in the Kandahar fortress. Seeing the amount of preparations on the Mughal side, Shah Safi finally abandoned plans to send his own troops. Sa‘id Khan decided to move against Siyavush. Two thousand cavalrymen were stationed to protect the fortress. 3,000 men were assigned to the direct confrontation with Siyavush, together with 8,000 cavalrymen, 400 riflemen and some of Alimardan Khan's troops. On April 11, they confronted Siyavush, who aligned 5,000 to 6,000 cavalrymen. The Mughals routed the Safavids and captured their camp. April 13 was a day of festivities around the Kandahar fortress:

Sa‘id Khan, enjoying victory and triumph, had the drums of rejoicing sounded and turned back. On the 28th of Dhu’l-Qa‘da [April 13] camp was made on the outskirts of Qandahar. The inhabitants, indeed all residents in the area, overjoyed by the defeat dealt by the warriors of the religion to the schismatic army, which had resulted in their freedom from the aggression of the oppressive Qizilbash, and mosques, in which litanies and zikrs had been nothing but curses on the Prophet’s companions, resounded with the good qualities of the Orthodox Caliphs and enumerations of the virtues of the just emperor.

— Padshahnama

== Later career ==
From 1645 to 1649, he served as the governor (hakem and beglarbeg) of Kuhgiluyeh. When in 1645 the re-appointed grand vizier Khalifeh Sultan urged for repressive laws against Isfahan's large Armenian community, the latter turned to Siyavosh Beg, himself a former Christian.

Like his then incumbent king Abbas II (1642-1666), Siyavosh Beg was an avid drinker. Siyavosh Beg's nisba is derived from "Bash-Achuk", a Persian appellation of the Kingdom of Imereti, in western Georgia, where he hailed from.

== Sources ==
- Fleischer, C. (1985). "ALLĀHVERDĪ KHAN (2)". Encyclopaedia Iranica, Vol. I, Fasc. 8. p. 892.
- Floor, Willem (2001). Safavid Government Institutions. Mazda Publishers. p. 172. ISBN 978-1568591353.
- Floor, Willem M. (2008). Titles and Emoluments in Safavid Iran: A Third Manual of Safavid Administration, by Mirza Naqi Nasiri. Washington, DC: Mage Publishers. pp. 224, 255, 308. ISBN 978-1933823232.
- Maeda, Hirotake (2003). "On the Ethno-Social Background of Four Gholām Families from Georgia in Safavid Iran". Studia Iranica (32): 267.
- Matthee, Rudolph P. (2005). The Pursuit of Pleasure: Drugs and Stimulants in Iranian History, 1500-1900. Princeton University Press. p. 55. ISBN 978-0691118550.
- Matthee, Rudi (2012). Persia in Crisis: Safavid Decline and the Fall of Isfahan. I.B.Tauris. p. 186. ISBN 978-1845117450.

Preceded by Farrokh Sultan	Governor of Derbent; 1632–1635	Succeeded by Shahverdi Sultan Ustajlu
Preceded by Khosrow Mirza	Commander of the gholam corps (qollar-aghasi); 1632–1655	Succeeded by Allahverdi Khan
Preceded by Zeynal Beg, son of Naqdi Khan	Governor of Kuhgiluyeh; 1645–1649	Succeeded by Allahverdi Khan
