= Jani Beg Khan Shamlu =

Safavid courtier (d. 1645)

Eshik-aqasi-bashi (master of ceremony)
- Monarchs: Safi I (r. 1629–1642); Abbas II (r. 1642–1666)

Qurchi-bashi (commander of the royal bodyguard)
- In office 1638–1645
- Monarchs: Safi I (r. 1629–1642); Abbas II (r. 1642–1666)
- Preceded by: Emir Khan Soklan Dhu'l-Qadr
- Succeeded by: Mortezaqoli Khan Begdeli Shamlu

Personal details
- Died: 15 October 1645
- Children: Abu'l-Qasem Beg Shamlu
- Clan: Shamlu

Jani Beg Khan Shamlu (Persian: جانی بیگ خان شاملو; died 15 October 1645) was the eshik-aqasi-bashi (master of ceremony) and qurchi-bashi (commander of the royal bodyguard) under the Safavid shahs (kings) of Iran, Safi (r. 1629–1642) and Abbas II (r. 1642–1666).

A member of the Shamlu tribe, the background of Jani Beg is obscure; he is referred as "a peasant's son" by the German scholar Adam Olearius, who also adds that Jani Beg was a "humble servant" during the reign of Abbas I (r. 1588–1629).

On 15 October 1645, Jani Beg, along with many of his associates and clansmen, were killed under the instigation of Anna Khanum, Abbas II's mother. His downfall did not have any negative effects on the career of his son Abu'l-Qasem Beg Shamlu, who later became the manager of the water distribution, then the divan-begi, then the mayor of Qazvin, and finally the khan of Hamadan.

== Sources ==
- Matthee, Rudi (2008). "Jāni Beg Khan Bigdeli Šāmlu". In Yarshater, Ehsan (ed.). Encyclopædia Iranica. Vol. XIV/5: Jamalzadeh, Mohammad-Ali II. Work–Japan IV. Iranians in Japan. London and New York: Routledge & Kegan Paul. pp. 544–545. ISBN 978-1-934283-06-6.
