= Qurchi (royal bodyguard) =

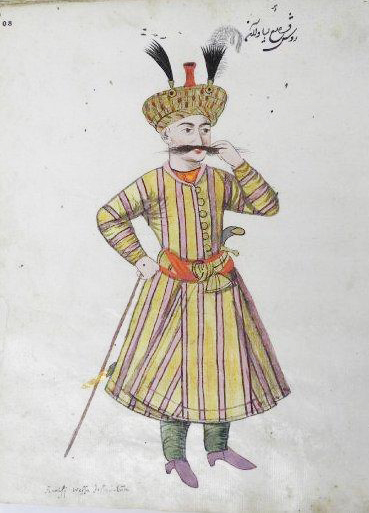
- 17th-century illustration of a qurchi.
- Active: 1501-1736
- Allegiance: Safavid dynasty
- Type: Royal bodyguard
- Size: c. 1,000-3,000 (under Ismail I); 5,000 (under Tahmasp I) c. 6,000 (under Ismail II) <3,000 (under Mohammad Khodabanda); 10,000-15,000 (under Abbas the Great); 20,000 (course of the 17th century)

Commanders
- First: Abdal Beg Talish
- Last: Qasem Beg Qajar

The qurchis or qorchis (Persian: قورچی, romanized: qurči) were the royal bodyguard of the Safavid emperor. The head of the qurchis was the qurchi-bashi.

== History ==
The term qurchi comes from Mongolian and meant "quiver-bearer". It was a title attached to the khan's household members during the Mongol Empire (1206-1259) and the Ilkhanate ruling Greater Persia (1264-1335). Qurchis were theoretically enlisted from the Qizilbash tribes and were paid by money taken from the treasury. Qurchis lived off land handouts and fees given to them by the emperor.

During the early Safavid period, the qurchis were all from the same tribe, but that changed. They numbered 3000 under the Ismail I at the Battle of Chaldiran, but were reduced to 1700 after the battle, and then later to 1000 after Ismail had "done away with 700 of them." They numbered 5000 under Tahmasp I (r. 1524–1576).

Under Abbas the Great, qurchis had become crucial and numbered 10 to 15,000. Abbas gave several qurchis the governorship of large provinces, which decreased the power of the Qizilbash commanders, who were used to governing large provinces. During the late period of Abbas' reign, the qurchi-bashi was the most powerful office of the empire.

Some qurchis were assigned to some provinces and cities, headed by officers also referred to as qurchi-bashi but were subordinate to a supreme qurchi-bashi. These qurchis were identified by the city or province they served in; for example, a qurchi stationed in Derbent was referred to as a Qurchi-e Darband.

Local rulers also had qurchis at their disposal, though they were limited in number. The vali (administrator) of Safavid Georgia had a qurchi corps to serve him, including a qurchi-bashi and a legion of specialized qurchis for his "accoutrements" (i.e. qurchi-e zereh, qurchi-e kafsh, qurchi-e tarkesh, etc.).

== Notes ==
a: The word is derived from Mongolian, which means "archer"
b: Due to internal issues among the Qizilbash

== Sources ==
- Blow, David (2009). Shah Abbas: The Ruthless King Who became an Iranian Legend. London, UK: I. B. Tauris & Co. Ltd. ISBN 978-1-84511-989-8. LCCN 2009464064.
- Floor, Willem (2001). Safavid Government Institutions. Costa Mesa, California: Mazda Publishers. ISBN 978-1568591353.
- Matthee, Rudi (2011). Persia in Crisis: Safavid Decline and the Fall of Isfahan. I.B.Tauris. pp. 1–371. ISBN 978-0857731814.
- Haneda, M. (1986). "ARMY iii. Safavid Period". Encyclopaedia Iranica, Vol. II, Fasc. 5. pp. 503–506.
- Babaie, Sussan (2004). Slaves of the Shah: New Elites of Safavid Iran. I.B.Tauris. pp. 1–218. ISBN 9781860647215.
- Newman, Andrew J. (2008). Safavid Iran: Rebirth of a Persian Empire. I.B.Tauris. pp. 1–281. ISBN 9780857716613.
- Savory, Roger (2007). Iran under the Safavids. Cambridge University Press. pp. 1–288. ISBN 978-0521042512.
- Roemer, H.R. (1986). "The Safavid period". The Cambridge History of Iran, Volume 5: The Timurid and Safavid periods. Cambridge: Cambridge University Press. pp. 189–351. ISBN 9780521200943.
- Haneda, Masashi (1989). "The Evolution of the Safavid Royal Guard". Iranian Studies. 22 (2/3): 57–85. doi:10.1080/00210868908701731. JSTOR 4310668.
