= House of Orbeliani =

Georgian noble family

Coat of arms of Princes Orbeliani

The House of Orbeliani (Georgian: ორბელიანი) was a Georgian noble family (tavadi), which branched off the House of Baratashvili in the 17th century and later produced several lines variously called Orbeliani, Orbelishvili (ორბელიშვილი), Qaplanishvili (ყაფლანიშვილი), and Jambakur(ian)-Orbeliani (ჯამბაკურ[იან]-ორბელიანი). They were prominent in Georgia's politics, culture, and science; remained so under the Russian rule in the 19th century – when most of the Orbeliani lines were received among the princely nobility (knyaz) of the Russian Empire – and into the 20th century.

== History ==
The Orbeliani sprang off the princes Baratashvili – themselves possible descendants of the medieval house of Liparitid-Orbeli – amid the bloody family feuds in the 17th century.

This new princely dynasty received the surname of Orbelishvili (later Orbeliani) or Qaplanishvili after its two early members – Orbel (fl. 1600) and his son Qaplan (killed in 1671). The Orbeliani were in possession of a large fief called Saorbelo or Saqaplanishvilo which comprised the southern part of the Baratashvili princedom (Sabaratiano), including much of the Ktsia and the Dmanisi valleys in what is now the Kvemo Kartli region of Georgia. They were considered among the six "undivided" houses of the Kingdom of Kartli, which outranked those that had succumbed to the weakening division of their dynastic allods.

By the early course of the 17th century, when Kartli was under the Safavid Iranian sway, the Baratashvili-Orbeliani clan was the largest noble family in Kartli.

By the 18th century, the Orbeliani exercised sovereignty over almost 100 lesser noble families (aznauri) and 2,000 peasants who lived in nearly 160 villages. They had a palace and familial abbey in Tandzia, castles at Dmanisi, Kveshi and Khuluti, and monasteries in Pitareti and Dmanisi. The members of the Orbeliani family were enfeoffed of the offices of High Constable of Somkhiti, Lord Chief Justice and, jointly with the House of Mukhrani and Panaskerteli, Prince-Master of the Palace of Georgia.

Towards the end of the 18th century, the Orbeliani left their patrimonial estates in Kvemo Kartli – plagued by incessant forays by the Turkic tribes – and resettled in Tbilisi, the capital of Georgia.

After the Russian annexation of Georgia, seven Orbeliani lines were recognized in a princely rank: four as Princes Dzhambakurian-Orbeliani (Russian: Джамбакуриан-Орбелиани), one as Princes Dzhambakur-Orbelianov (Джамбакур-Орбелианов), and two as Princes Orbelianov (Орбельянов). Other variations of the surname include Orbelianoff and Arbeloff (primarily in Europe and the USA), and Арбелієв or Арбелов in Ukraine and Russia.

Family	Date of recognition	Date of confirmation	Governorate	Notes
Dzhambakurian-Orbeliani I	7 March 1826	22 December 1848, 13 April and 12 October 1849, 28 November 1851	Tiflis	
Dzhambakurian-Orbeliani II	9 October 1829	24 November 1854	Tiflis	
Dzhambakurian-Orbeliani III	6 December 1850		Tiflis	
Dzhambakurian-Orbeliani IV	28 March 1873		Tiflis	Authorization for the ward of Prince Dimitri Dzhambakurian-Orbeliani, Fevronia (a natural daughter of Prince Aleksandr Baryatinsky and Princess Elisaveta Dmitrievna Dzhambakurian-Orbeliani, born before their marriage), to take the name and title of her guardian
Dzhambakur-Orbelianov	20 September 1825	28 November 1851, 9 October and 27 November 1858	Tiflis	
Orbelianov I	20 September 1825		Tiflis	
Orbelianov II	17 June 1852 and 9 July 1853		Poltava	This branch came to Russia in the suite of King Vakhtang VI in the 1720s

== Notable members ==
- Otar Beg Orbeliani (b. circa. 1583, fl. 17th century), a governor and military commander
- Vakhushti Khan Orbeliani (d. 1667/69), a governor
- Sulkhan-Saba Orbeliani (1658–1725), a writer, monk, and diplomat
- Gorjasbi Beg Orbeliani (fl. 17th century), a military commander and governor
- David Orbeliani (1739–1796), a soldier, politician, and translator
- Prince Vakhtang Orbeliani (1769–1 March 1812), mouravi of Sagarejo and colonel in the Russian service, husband of Princess Tekle
- Alexander Orbeliani (1802–1869), a poet, playwright, journalist, and historian
- Grigol Orbeliani (1804–1883), a poet, and soldier
- Vakhtang Orbeliani (1812–1890), a poet and soldier
- Georgi Ilich Orbeliani (1853–1924), a soldier
- Ivan Makarovich Orbeliani (1844-1919), a general
- Sonia Orbeliani (1875-1915) Maid of honor & lady-in-waiting to the last Tsarina of Russia, Alexandra Feodorovna (Alix of Hesse)
