= Isa Khan Sheykhavand =

17th century Safavid prince who occupied high offices under Shah Abbas I

Isa Khan Safavi
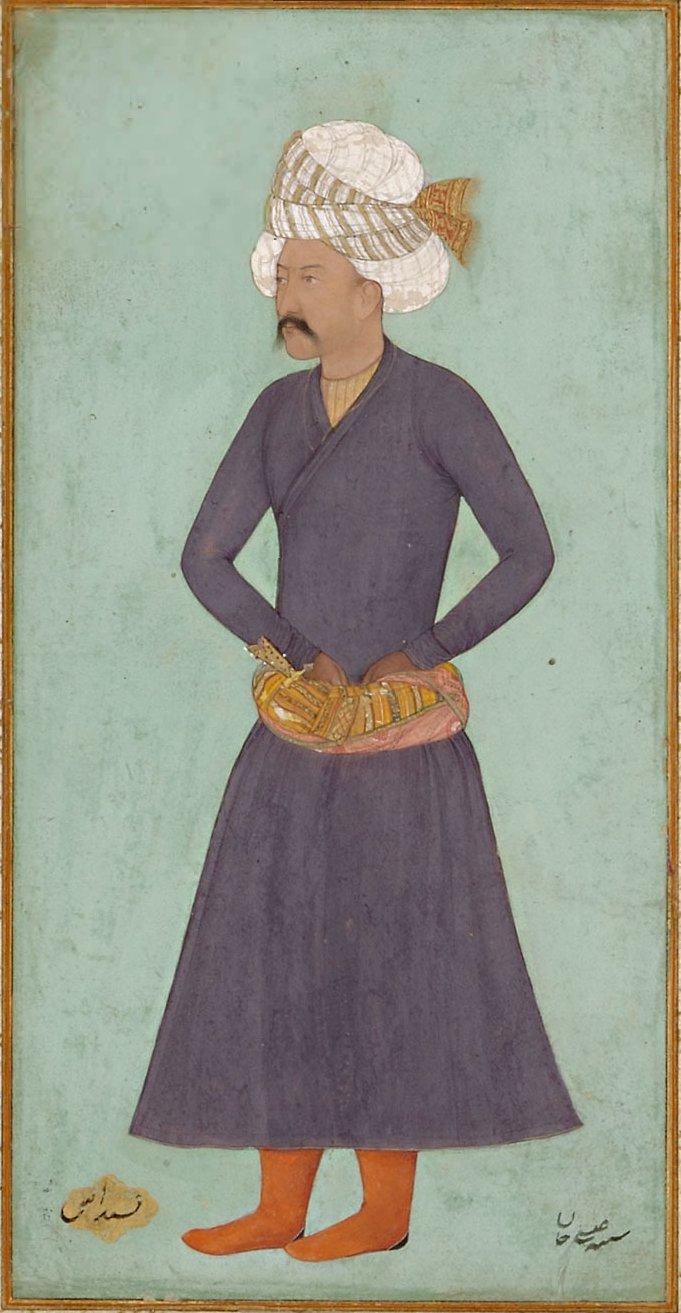
- Painting of Isa Khan Sheykhavand

Qurchi-bashi (Head of the Royal Bodyguard)
- Tenure: 1612–1631
- Predecessor: Allahqoli Beg Qapameh-oghli Qajar
- Successor: Cheragh Khan Zahedi
- Died: 1631
- House: Sheykhavand
- Dynasty: Safavid
- Military career
- Allegiance: Safavid Iran
- Conflicts: Battle of Marabda

Isa Khan Sheykhavand (Persian: عیسی خان شیخوند), also known as Isa Khan Safavi (عیسی خان صفوی), was a Safavid prince, who occupied high offices under king (shah) Abbas I (r. 1588–1629).

== Biography ==
Isa Khan was the grandson of the Safavid vizier Masum Beg Safavi, and was married to one of Abbas' daughters. In 1612, he was appointed by Abbas I as the head of the royal bodyguard (qurchi-bashi). In 1625, Isa Khan was appointed as the commander of the Safavid army of Georgia and fought a group of Georgian rebels on June 30. During the battle, he was almost defeated by the rebels, until reinforcements arrived from Azerbaijan and helped Isa Khan defeat the rebels.

In 1629, Abbas I died and was succeeded by his grandson Safi, who in 1631 executed Isa Khan including his three sons. Isa Khan's successor in the qurchi-bashi post was Cheragh Khan Zahedi.

During the reign of Safi's son and successor Abbas II (r. 1642–1666), a mausoleum was constructed for the three sons of Isa Khan.

== Sources ==
- Blow, David (2009). Shah Abbas: The Ruthless King Who became an Iranian Legend. London, UK: I. B. Tauris & Co. Ltd. ISBN 978-1-84511-989-8. LCCN 2009464064.
- Matthee, Rudi (2011). Persia in Crisis: Safavid Decline and the Fall of Isfahan. I.B.Tauris. pp. 1–371. ISBN 978-0857731814.
- Babaie, Sussan (2004). Slaves of the Shah: New Elites of Safavid Iran. I.B.Tauris. pp. 1–218. ISBN 9781860647215.
- Matthee, Rudi (2010). "ḴALIFA SOLṬĀN". Encyclopaedia Iranica, Vol. XV, Fasc. 4. pp. 382–384.
- Newman, Andrew J. (2008). Safavid Iran: Rebirth of a Persian Empire. I.B.Tauris. pp. 1–281. ISBN 9780857716613.

Preceded by Allah Qoli Beg Qajar	Qurchi-bashi; 1612-1631	Succeeded by Cheragh Khan Zahedi
