= Otar Beg =

Safavid military commander, royal gholam, and official

Governor of Semnan
- In office Unknown–1638
- Preceded by: Amir Khan Mohrdar Soklan Zu al-Faqār
- Succeeded by: Manuchehr Beg

Governor of Qandahar
- In office 1649–1662/63
- Preceded by: Mihrab Khan
- Succeeded by: Unknown

Prefect of New Julfa
- In office 1626–Unknown
- Preceded by: Mirman Mirimanidze
- Succeeded by: Unknown

Personal details
- Born: 1583
- Died: 1662/63
- Parent: Aslamaz (father)
- Relatives: Otar / Zu al-Faqār (brother), Gorjasbi / Mansur (brother), Kaykhosrow (brother), Qaplan (cousin), Erizbar (uncle)
- Occupation: Military leader, official
- Clan: Baratashvili-Orbelishvili (Orbeliani)
- Nickname: Zu al-Faqār Khan

Military service
- Allegiance: Safavid Iran
- Battles/wars: Mughal–Safavid War of 1649–1653

Otar Beg, also known as Otar Khan, later known as Zu al-Faqār Khan (born circa 1583 – died 1662/63), was a Safavid military commander, royal gholam, and official from the Georgian Baratashvili-Orbelishvili (Orbeliani) clan.

== Biography ==
Not much is known about the early life of Otar Beg. His original family name was Baratashvili-Orbelishvili, which is also referred to as Orbeliani and Qaplanishvili. His father's name was Aslamaz and he had two younger brothers, Vakhushti and Gorjasbi (Mansur), who also held prominent positions like him. According to Alexander Orbeliani (1802–1869), Otar had one more brother named Kaykhosrow. He furthermore had a known younger cousin named Qaplan Baratashili-Orbelishvili (Orbeliani) (?–1671), who had fled to mainland Iran in the early 17th century after the death of his father Elizbar Baratashvili-Orbelishvili, the latter being therefore Otar's uncle.

Otar was mentioned for the first time in the Iranian sources in 1626, when he held the function of darugha (prefect) of New Julfa, having succeeded Mirman Mirimanidze (Safiqoli Khan) in this post. When king Abbas I died in 1629, he had already been appointed as governor of Semnan and possessed the rank of soltan. Later, in 1649, during the reign of king Abbas II (r. 1562–1666), he was given the governorship of Qandahar in the easternmost territories, as well as the honorary name of Zu al-Faqār Khan. When Qandahar was surrounded by the Mughal forces in 1653, the city nearly fell due to the protracted siege, and Otar was blamed for his soft attitude. According to the contemporary Safavid historian and author Valiqoli Shamlu, who served Otar personally in Qandahar, Otar answered that he would fight alone till the end and, after his death, behave as generals liked to do. He is quoted: "I have served the Safavid kings for seventy years. My bones are made from Shah's (kings) different kinds of graces".

== Sources ==
- Floor, Willem; Herzig, Edmund (2015). Iran and the World in the Safavid Age. I.B.Tauris. p. 481. ISBN 978-1780769905.
- Floor, Willem M. (2008). Titles and Emoluments in Safavid Iran: A Third Manual of Safavid Administration, by Mirza Naqi Nasiri. Washington, DC: Mage Publishers. pp. 257, 275. ISBN 978-1933823232.
- Maeda, Hirotake (2003). "On the Ethno-Social Background of Four Gholām Families from Georgia in Safavid Iran". Studia Iranica (32): 1–278.

Preceded by Amir Khan Mohrdar Soklan Zu al-Faqār	Governor of Semnan ?-1638	Succeeded by Manuchehr Beg
Preceded by Mirman Mirimanidze	Prefect of New Julfa; 1626	Unknown
Preceded by Mihrab Khan	Governor of Qandahar; 1649-1662/63	Succeeded by Mansur Khan
