= Military of Safavid Iran =

Military history of Safavid Iran from 1501 to 1736

- سپاه ایران; Sēpâh-ē Īrân
- Founded: 1501
- Disbanded: 1736
- Service branches: Qizilbash; Qurchi; Gholam; Tupchi; Tofangchi

Leadership
- Commander-in-chief: Hossein Beg Laleh Shamlu (first); Hosaynqoli Khan (last)
- Qurchi-bashi Qollar-aghasi Tupchi-bashi Tofangchi-aghasi: Abdal Beg Talish (first); Qasem Beg Qajar (last); Yulqoli Beg (first); Mohammad-Ali (last); Hamza Beg (first); Mehdi Khan (last); Mirza Shah Hossein (first); Shahverdi Khan Cheshmkazik (last)

Related articles
- History: Military history

The military of Safavid Iran covers the military history of Safavid Iran from 1501 to 1736.

== Foundation of the Safavid military ==
It was the first Safavid king (shah), Ismail I (1501–1524), who laid foundation to the Safavid military. Its origins date back to 1500, when Ismail decided to come out of hiding from Lahijan, a city in Gilan, northern Iran. On his way to Azerbaijan, he recruited followers, and had already recruited 450 at Rasht and 1,500 at Tarom. By summer, Ismail had already gathered 7,000 followers, mostly Turkmens from Asia Minor, whom he had rallied together in Erzincan, while the rest were Iranians, mainly from northern Iran. Ismail fought the Shirvanshah Farrukh Yassar during the same year, where his army is said to have ranged from 7,000 to 40,000.

Another founding element of the Safavid armies, alongside the Turkomans and the Iranians, were ethnic Georgians. Numerous contemporary independent Venetian sources report that, as early as 1499, Ismail had Christian cavalry at his disposal. According to a contemporary Venetian merchant, a certain Morati Augurioto, who returned to Venice from Tabriz in 1503, the majority of the Safavid troops in the city were of Georgian origin. When Ismail founded the Safavid state in about 1500, the Qizilbash numbered some 7,000, whereas the number of the Georgians, part of the larger (i.e. the entire) Safavid army, numbered about 9,000. After the decisive Battle of Chaldiran (1514), Georgian light cavalry of the Safavid army intensively harassed the retreating Ottoman troops, deep into the Ottoman realm.

== Highest military commanders ==
Of the posts that were considered to be "pillars of the state" (rokn ol-dowleh, or arkan ol-dowleh), at least three were from the military administration; the qollar-aghasi, the qurchi-bashi, and the tofangchi-aghasi. (Note: The tofangchi-aghasi was not always recorded as being a "pillar of the state", such as during the reign of king Abbas II (1642-1666).)

At least three of the leading commanding posts had a reserved seat in the small inner council (or privy), known as the janqi. The janqi was a part of the royal council, and was basically responsible for governing the country. Membership of the janqi was limited to the officials of utmost importance. All three aforementioned high-ranking military officials, considered to be "pillars of the state", were also recorded as being part of the janqi by the end of the Safavid period. The commander-in-chief (sepahsalar) also joined the inner council when military matters were discussed.

=== Commander-in-chief ===
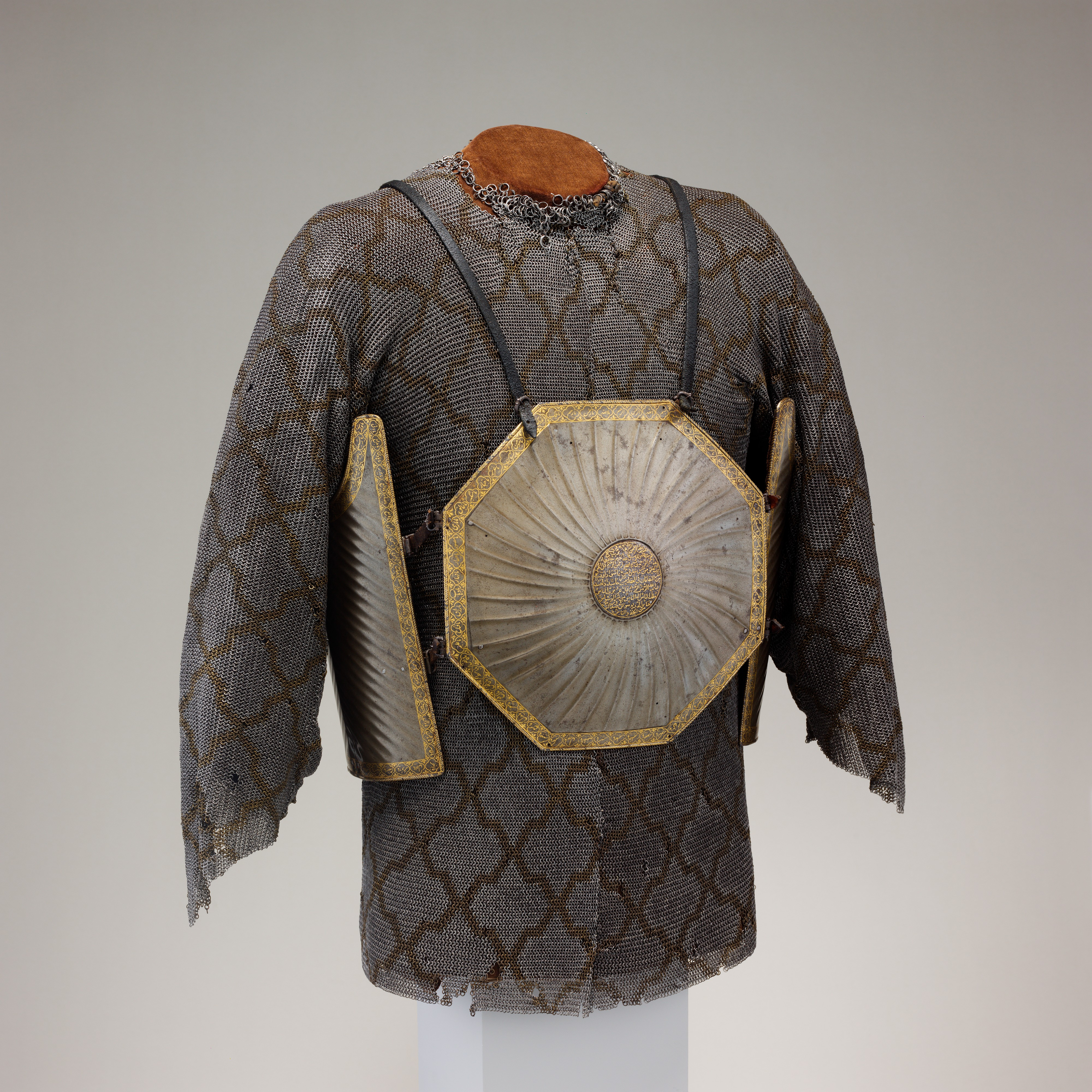
Cuirass (Char-aina) Safavid, 17th-early 18th century.

The office of commander-in-chief (sepahsalar(-e Iran), amir ol-omara), was one of the highest-ranking functions. In the early days of the Safavid Empire, the holders of the office were usually Qizilbash lords of Turkoman stock. However, from the early 17th century onwards, the post became pretty much dominated by non-Qizilbash, especially gholams of Georgian origin. Another feature that became almost characteristic for the office was that, from the seventeenth century onwards, it was combined with that of the governorship of the Azerbaijan Province.

Until 1533, the post of commander-in-chief was combined with that of viceregent (vakil). Sensing the considerable amount of influence that was yielded by these individuals, who thus held both posts, in 1533 Tahmasp decided to reduce the significance of the commander-in-chief, and implemented that no one could be reappointed to the post of vakil as well. By the late 1530s, the commander-in-chief was no longer the most important military commander in the empire amongst the Qizilbash lords, as Tahmasp I created the function of beglarbeg (governor, governor-general), who was also the commander-in-chief in his own province. These important governors had full authority over the provincial amirs. In other words, there was no longer one supreme amir ol-omara anymore, but more than ten. This considerably diminished the power of the Qizilbash lords, and strengthened the central authority.

Until the early seventeenth century, the sepahsalar(-e Iran) / amir ol-omara was equal in rank to the qurchi-bashi. From the early seventeenth century onwards, he was subordinate in rank to the qollar-aghasi and qurchi-bashi. Nevertheless, because of its importance and the fact that the holder was also often a provincial governor, he also had a deputy (na'eb) and a vizier. There were even commanders-in-chief that held more positions at the same time. For example, Rostam Beg (later "khan") simultaneously held the positions of sepahsalar / amir ol-omara, tofangchi-aghasi, and divanbegi (chancellor, chief justice).

According to Mirza Naqi Nasiri, a high-ranking court official, the sepahsalar had supreme command of the army in time of war. Towards the end of the Safavid era the holder of the function was one of the council amirs, and, together with the qollar-aghasi, the two most important military officials after the qurchi-bashi. When Vakhtang VI (Hosaynqoli Khan) was appointed sepahsalar, he was also given a marshal's baton. According to the Iranologist Willem Floor, this was the first time mentioned in historical records, that a sepahsalar was given such an item, distinct for a field marshal.

=== Qurchi-bashi ===
The qurchi-bashi (also spelled qorchi-bashi) was the commander of the royal bodyguard (the (qurchis) of the Safavid king. It was the oldest state rank of the Safavid Empire, and a "very important" official of the central government. He was always selected from the qurchi corps itself. Nevertheless, this did not create a mandatory prequisite for qurchis to be commanded by a qurchi commander. For example, during the sixteenth century, qurchis were often commanded in the field by other officials than from the qurchi ranks, including by high-ranking gholams, such as Mokhles Beg Gorji (a Georgian).

The qurchi-bashi functioned in the same way to the qurchis, as the local lords to the Qizilbash tayefeh or il (i.e. tribal unit, clan). Reportedly, none of the qurchi-bashis possessed the rank of "khan", though some did have the rank of "beg". According to Masashi Haneda, this apparently indicated that even though it was a function of utmost importance, it was not considered to be a function of "the first-order". Haneda states that this is apparent through the Persian sources, which do not "pay attention to the nomination of the qurchi-bashi". The sources did pay attention to the appointment of the amir ol-omara, vakil or sadr. The conclusion according to Willem Floor is therefore, that the qurchis and the qurchi-bashi "played second-fiddle" to that of the leading Qizilbash lords.

During periods of weak central authority, the post was immediately taken by individuals from the leading Turkoman Qizilbash tribes, i.e. the Shamlu or Tekkelu. The qurchi-bashi, alike all other important offices, had a deputy as well.

There were also qurchi-bashis who were stationed in some of the provinces and cities. For example, the vali (governor, viceroy) of Georgia had a qurchi corps to serve him, including a qurchi-bashi, and a legion of specialized qurchis for his "accoutrements" (i.e. qurchi-e zereh, qurchi-e kafsh, qurchi-e tarkesh, etc.). These "provincial qurchi-bashis" however, were all subordinate to the supreme qurchi-bashi.

=== Qollar-aghasi ===
The qollar-aghasi (also spelled qullar-aqasi) was the commander of the empire's élite gholam (military slave) corps. Soon after its creation, it had already become one of the most important officials in the empire. This fact is reflected in the choice of numerous qollar-aghasis. For example, the most famous general of Abbas I (r. 1588-1629), the celebrated Allahverdi Khan, was the second qollar-aghasi. The first qollar-aghasi of Safi's reign was Khosrow Mirza of the Bagrationi dynasty, who later served as vali (viceroy) of Kartli, and was given the name of Rostam Khan. His successor was a Georgian from Imereti, Siyavosh Beg. Though some of the later qollar-aghasis were of non-gholam origin, the function was dominated by gholams, many of whom were of Georgian origin.

By the end of the Safavid era, the qollar-aghasi and the sepahsalar / amir ol-omara were the most important military officials in the empire, after the qurchi-bashi. The qollar-aghasi was one of the six "pillars of the state" (rokn ol-dowleh), and an amir of the council. He had supreme command over the min-bashis, yuz-bashis, qurs armed with muskets, and naturally all gholams. He also gave the verdict over cases in which his subordinates were involved. However, cases which involved religious law were given to the shar'i judges, whereas cases involving fiscal matters, were given to the Grand Vizier.

Young gholams came under the command of the qollar-aghasi when they started to have beard growth, and they were subsequently organized into units of 100 and 10. The "rank-and-file" came under the jurisdiction of the yuz-bashi who themselves were assisted by the dah-bashis or on-bashis.

=== Tupchi-bashi ===
The Tupchi-bashi was the commander of the empire's artillery corps. Organized just like the other army units, he was assisted by an administrative staff as well as officers of lower rank. The tupchi-bashi was responsible for the artillery battery (tup-khaneh) and needed materials in relation to the artillery pieces as well. He had supreme command over all min-bashis, yuz-bashis, tupchis, and jarchis of the artillery department. The tupchi-bashi also appointed all these aforementioned officers of lower rank, and he had to approve of their pay as well. In 1660, reportedly, his salary amounted 2,000 tomans per year, and formally, he was equal to the commander of the musketeer corps (tofangchi-aghasi). In terms of administration, the mostoufi of the gholam corps also took care of the tup-khaneh of the tupchi-bashi.

When in 1655 the tupchi-bashi Hoseinqoli Khan died, king Abbas II (r. 1642-1666) did not appoint a new one. The jabbehdar-bashi ("head of the royal arsenal") took over its role temporarily until 1660-1661. Floor mentions that the post may then have become vacant afterwards, for a few years.

The term tupchi-bashi was also used to designate the commanders of local artillery batteries in the various cities and provinces of the empire. A proper example of this would be the year 1701, when one of the artillerymen (tupchis) in Tiflis was appointed vakil ("regent") of the tupchi-bashi of Tiflis fortress.

The office of tupchi-bashi ranked evidently lower than the sepahsalar, qollar-aghasi and qurchi-bashi, and his salary was thus lower as well. According to Engelbert Kaempfer, the tupchi-bashi also served as an admiral, though there was basically no effective Safavid fleet until 1734.

=== Tofangchi-aghasi ===
The Tofangchi-aghasi (also spelled tufangchi-aqasi and otherwise known as tofangchi-bashi) was the commander of the Safavid Empire's musketeer corps. The tofangchi-aghasi was assisted by numerous officers, i.e. minbashis, yuzbashis, dahbashis, as well as an administrative staff (i.e. vizier, mostoufi), who dealt with the muster rolls. Apart from the tofangchis, he also held supreme command over the jarchibashis, rikas (staff bearers armed with pole axes), and tabardars of the musketeer corps. He was one of the six rokn ol-dowleh ("pillar of the state").

Though the tofangchi-aghasi was considered to be a high-ranking office on paper, de facto, it was one of the lowest on the "military totem-pole", in other words, military hierarchy. For example, the tofangchi-aghasi, despite being a rokn ol-dowleh, was not a member of the inner royal council. Nevertheless, the post was generally held by scions of noble families.

== Units ==
Under the Safavids, Iran was one of the Gunpowder Empires, a trio of Islamic great powers that dominated North Africa, West Asia, Central Asia, and South Asia from the early 16th to mid 18th centuries. However, it was by far the least populous of the three (with an estimated 8 to 10 million people in 1600) and thus had the smallest army. Moreover it did not make use of gunpowder to the same extent as the Ottomans or contemporary European powers. Until c. 1600, firearms were present but had a minor role, with even simple siege cannons seeing rare use. Abbas I was the first ruler to establish a significant corps of musketeers and a separate corps of artillery, which were relatively effective but were always outnumbered by masses of cavalry armed with lances, swords, and bows. The musket corps did not significantly expand, while the artillery corps faded out of existence after Abbas I's reign. By the mid-18th century, most Safavid troops were still using traditional weapons. It was not until partway through the rule of Nader Shah (1736-1747), founder of the Afsharid dynasty, that the majority of an Iranian empire's troops would be equipped with firearms for the first time.

=== Qizilbash ===
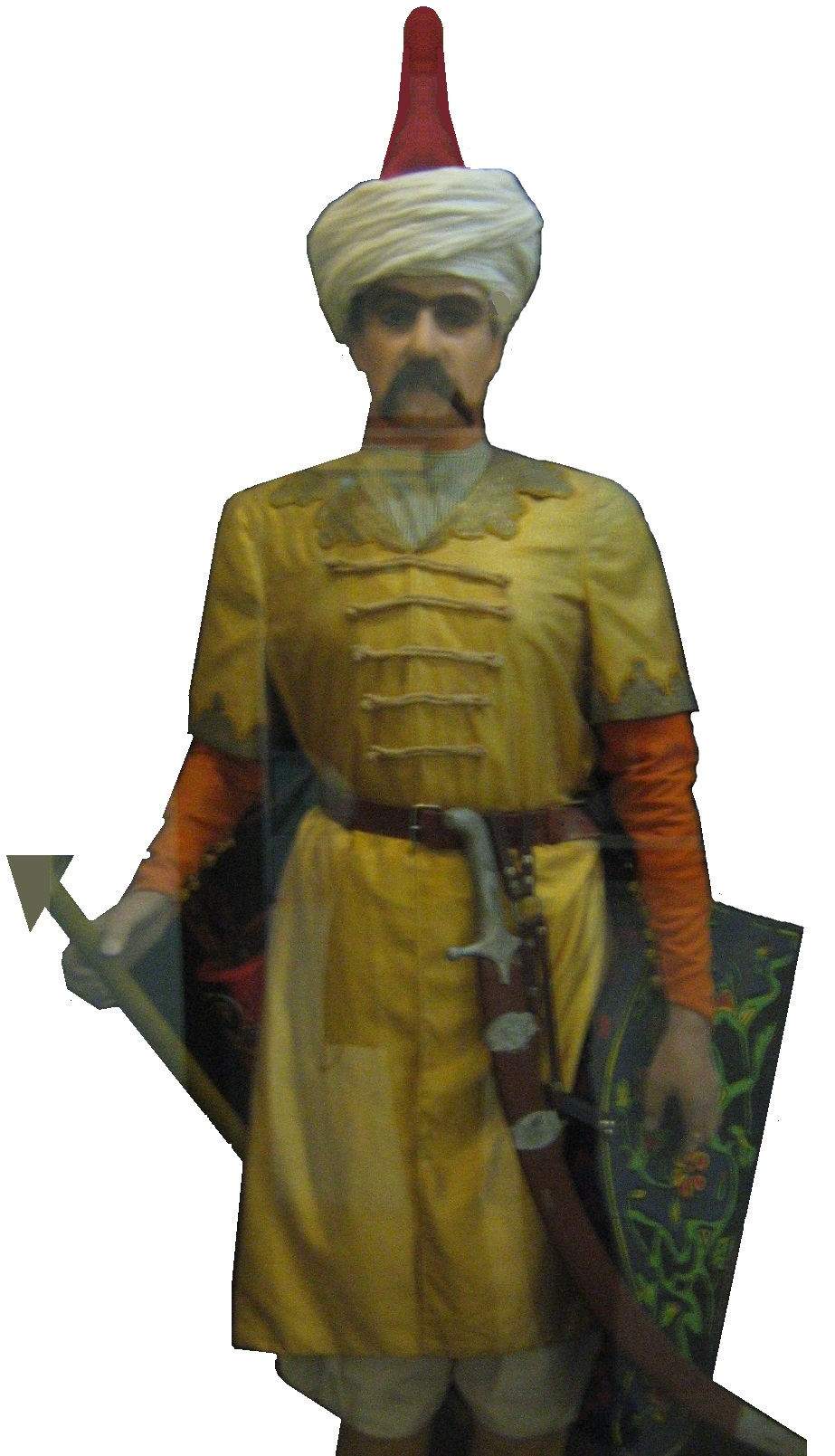
Mannequin of a Safavid Qizilbash soldier, exhibited in Sa'dabad, Iran

The Qizilbash was a Shia militant group which mostly consisted of Turkoman tribes, but also Iranian ones, such as the Talysh and certain Kurdish tribes. The largest tribes of the Qizilbash were the Ustajlu, the Rumlu, the Shamlu, the Zul Qadr, the Tekkelu, the Afshar and the Qajar—all Turkmens. The Qizilbash were the main factor of the foundation of the Safavid dynasty and the conquest of Iran. Unlike the gholam corps, the Qizilbash did not rely on payment from royal treasury, but were instead granted land. In return, they supplied the Safavid shah with troops and provisions.

During the reign of Ismail, the Qizilbash almost saw him as a divine person, and regarded him as the representative of the hidden Imam Muhammad al-Mahdi. A group drawn from the Qizilbash, known as the "ahl-i ikhtisas", was a small group of officers, who had kept the Safaviyya order alive during Ismail's refuge in Gilan. These officers included a lala ("tutor", "guardian"), and many others. Ismail later adopted a policy by trying to avoid appointing the Qizilbash to the powerful vakil (vicegerent) office, and instead appointed his Iranian kinsmen to high offices, the first one being Mir Najm Zargar Gilani. This was because Ismail had lost some trust to the Qizilbash, who possessed too much power and were no longer very trustworthy.

The fifth Safavid shah Abbas I (r. 1588–1629), made the gholam corps much stronger in order to counterbalance the power and influence of the Qizilbash. Furthermore, he appointed non-Qizilbash officers as the governors of provinces which the Qizilbash used to govern.

=== Qurchi ===
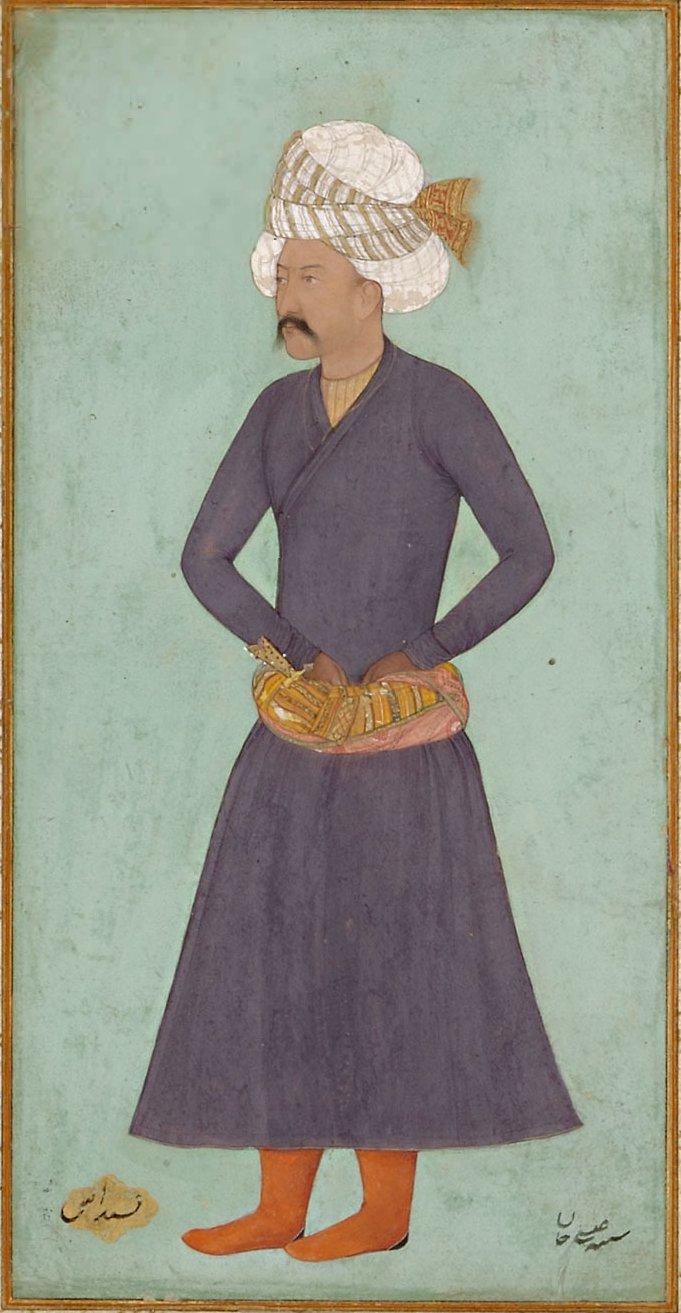
Painting of Isa Khan Safavi, a notable Safavid prince who served as the qurchi-bashi.

The royal bodyguard of the shah was known as the qurchi. The qurchis were theoretically enlisted from the Qizilbash tribes and were paid by money taken from the royal treasury. Though recruited mainly from among the Qizilbash, it was an independent and distinct corps from the Qizilbash army units. During the early Safavid period, the qurchis were all from the same tribe, but that later changed. The head of the qurchis was known as the qurchi-bashi. They numbered 3,000 under the Ismail I and 5,000 under Tahmasp I (r. 1524–1576).

Under Abbas I, the qurchis had become much more important and numbered 10,000-15,000. Abbas I gave several of qurchis governorship of large provinces, which decreased the power of the Qizilbash commanders, who were used to govern large provinces. During the late reign of Abbas' reign, the qurchi-bashi was the most powerful office of the empire.

Local rulers also had qurchis at their disposal, though they were limited in number. The vali (governor, viceroy) of Georgia had a qurchi corps to serve him, including a qurchi-bashi, and a legion of specialized qurchis for his "accoutrements" (i.e. qurchi-e zereh, qurchi-e kafsh, qurchi-e tarkesh, etc.).

=== Gholam ===
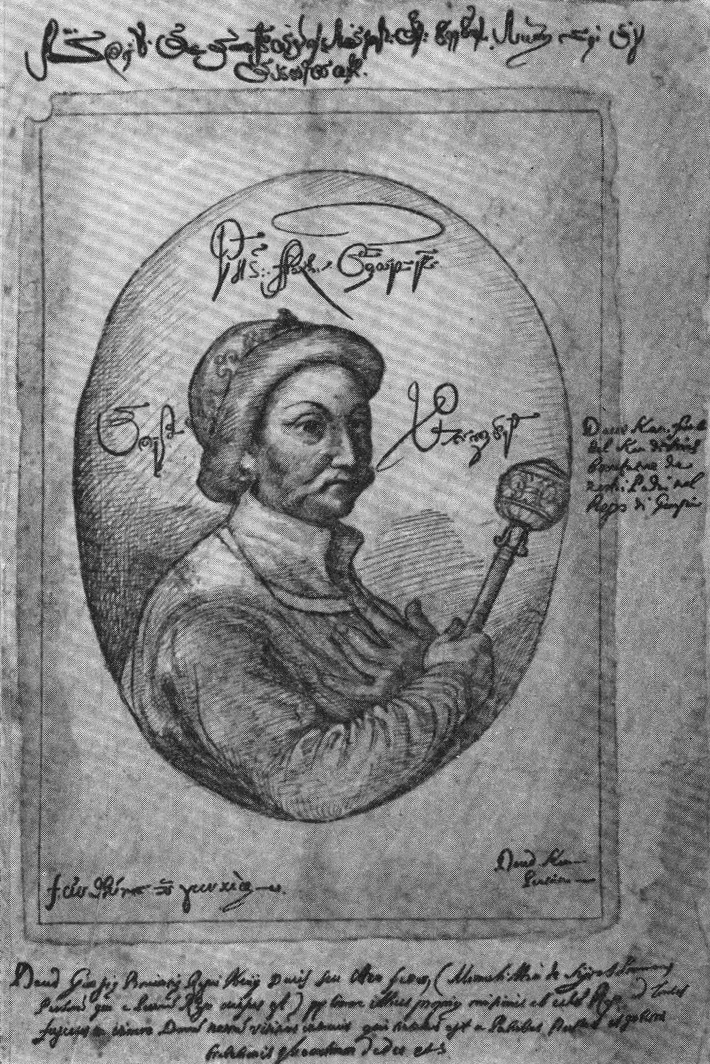
The gholam Daud Khan Undiladze and the governor of Safavid Karabakh from 1627 to 1633.

The ghilman consisted of former Christians from Caucasus, mainly Georgians, Circassians, and Armenians. The singular form is gholam, and the term refers to soldiers who were slaves of the emperor and was generally similar to the janissary system of the neighbouring Ottoman Empire in its implementation and formation. Unlike Ottoman slaves, Safavid slaves were allowed to inherit "their father's assignments", which explains "the Safavid particularity of factions centred on slave families".

According to Babaev, the gholam unit was created by Abbas after the assassination of the powerful Qizilbash figure Murshid Quli Khan in 1588/9. This is proven by the appointment of Yulqoli as the qollar-aghasi, or chief of the ghilman, in 1589/90. However, the qollar-aghasi is also mentioned in 1583/4 during the reign of Abbas' father and predecessor, Mohammad Khodabanda (r. 1578–1587). The ghulam system was most likely created under Tahmasp I's campaigns in Kartili and Kakheti in the South Caucasus.

As mentioned by the Encyclopædia Iranica, 1600 onwards, the Safavid statesman Allahverdi Khan, in conjunction with Robert Shirley, undertook the reorganization of the army, which meant, among other things, dramatically increasing the number of ghilman from 4000 to 25,000.

Only after the reforms of Abbas c. 1600 did the Safavid military transition from a tribal horse archer force with few firearms to a primarily infantry musketeer army, becoming a match for the Ottomans.

It was during the vizierate of Saru Taqi (1633-1645) under Abbas I that the gholams reached their zenith of power, occupying all the important offices of the Safavid state.

=== Tupchi ===
The Tupchi or "artillerist" unit was created under Ismail I and later reformed by Abbas I. The commander of the artillery corps was the tupchi-bashi. Although the tupchiyan proved potent in war, not much known is about them, and they are mostly mentioned in European sources.

=== Tofangchi ===
The tofangchi ("musketeer") unit was created under Ismail I and reformed by Abbas. The commander of the musketeer corps was the tofangchi-aghasi. Tofangchiyan were enlisted from different regions and coordinated under the name of the place they came from. For example, if one tofangchi unit was from Isfahan, it became known the tofangchiyan-e Esfahan. The head of each tofangchi group was known as a min-bashi "chief of a thousand". The unit numbered 12,000 and mainly included Persian peasants, Arabs, and Turkmens.

== Titles of honor ==
There were three titles of honor in the Safavid military, the highest one being "khan", the second being "sultan", and the third being "beg". Although not many held the title of "khan" during the early Safavid period, it later increased.

== See also ==
- Defensive walls in Safavid Iran

== Sources ==
- Blow, David (2009). Shah Abbas: The Ruthless King Who became an Iranian Legend. London, UK: I. B. Tauris & Co. Ltd. ISBN 978-1-84511-989-8. LCCN 2009464064.
- Matthee, Rudi (2011). Persia in Crisis: Safavid Decline and the Fall of Isfahan. I.B.Tauris. pp. 1–371. ISBN 978-0857731814.
- Haneda, M. (1986). "ARMY iii. Safavid Period". Encyclopaedia Iranica, Vol. II, Fasc. 5. pp. 503–506.
- Babaie, Sussan; Babayan, Kathryn; Baghdiantz-McCabe, Ina; Farhad, Massumeh (2004). Slaves of the Shah: New Elites of Safavid Iran. I.B.Tauris. ISBN 978-0857716866.
- Floor, Willem (2001). Safavid Government Institutions. Costa Mesa, California: Mazda Publishers. pp. 1–311. ISBN 978-1568591353.
- Newman, Andrew J. (2008). Safavid Iran: Rebirth of a Persian Empire. I.B.Tauris. pp. 1–281. ISBN 9780857716613.
- Savory, Roger (2007). Iran under the Safavids. Cambridge University Press. pp. 1–288. ISBN 978-0521042512.
- Roemer, H.R. (1986). "The Safavid period". The Cambridge History of Iran, Volume 5: The Timurid and Safavid periods. Cambridge: Cambridge University Press. pp. 189–351. ISBN 9780521200943.
- Mazzaoui, Michel M. (2002). "NAJM-E ṮĀNI". Encyclopaedia Iranica.
