= Titles & Emoluments in Safavid Iran: A Third Manual of Safavid Administration =

- Editor: Willem Floor
- Published: 2008 (Mage Publishers)

Titles & Emoluments in Safavid Iran: A Third Manual of Safavid Administration is a book about the Safavid Empire, published by Mage Publishers, with Willem Floor as author. According to the book description it: "contains unique and important information on offices, ethnic attitudes and administrative developments in Iran's Safavid government". The book lists administrative jurisdictions with names and dates of each of its governors.

== See also ==
- Mirza Naqi Nasiri
