= Mirza Naqi Nasiri =

Safavid official (died 1731)

Mirza (Ali)-Naqi Nasiri (died 1731) was an official in the late Safavid era, from the Ordubadi family, who served as the secretary of the royal council (majles-nevis or vaqāye'-nevis) for several years. He is noted for being the author of an important treatise, which he completed in the summer of 1731, during the reign of king Tahmasp II, about the empire's organization, functions, titles and remuneration. In modern times, the original text written by Mirza Naqi used to be in the possession of Hajj Hoseyn Agha Nakhjevani, who, in view of its contents and with the original title unknown, gave it the name Alqāb va Mavājeb-e Dowreh-ye Salātin-e Safaviyeh, and later donated it to the library of Tabriz.

This treatise is nowadays commonly referred to as the "third manual of Safavid administration". It remains known as a key document in the scholarship regarding the Safavid period, and together with the Dastur al-Moluk and the Tadhkerat-al Moluk (hence, "third"), the only surviving administrative manuals of the period.

== See also ==
- Titles & Emoluments in Safavid Iran: A Third Manual of Safavid Administration

== Sources ==
- Floor, Willem M. (2008). Titles and Emoluments in Safavid Iran: A Third Manual of Safavid Administration, by Mirza Naqi Nasiri. Washington, DC: Mage Publishers. pp. 1–324. ISBN 978-1933823232.
- Marcinkowski, M. Ismail (2005). "DASTUR AL-MOLUK". Encyclopaedia Iranica.
- Newman, Andrew J. (2008). Safavid Iran: Rebirth of a Persian Empire. I.B.Tauris. p. 143. ISBN 978-0857716613.
