= Willem Floor =

Dutch Iranologist (born 1942)

Willem Marius Floor (born 1942) is a Dutch historian, writer, and Iranologist. He was born in 1942 in Utrecht, the Netherlands. After finishing high school, he attended the University of Utrecht where he studied economics, non-Western sociology, and Islamic studies. He also studied Arabic and eventually became interested in Persian. He received his PhD from the University of Leiden in 1971. The title of his PhD dissertation was "The Guilds In Qajar Persia." Ever since, he has been engaged in Iranian studies. Throughout this time, he has published extensively on the socio-economic history of Iran. As an independent scholar, Willem Floor has published numerous works of history as well as translations. Dr. Floor is also a winner of Farabi International Prize for Humanitarian Studies.

== Professional Background ==
He started his professional career in 1968 at the Ministry of Development in the Netherlands. Between 1983 and 2002. Dr. Floor was employed by the World Bank as an energy specialist. For example, his report on a study of the difficulties involved in applying solar energy in developing countries, den Haag was published in terms of a book "Solar Energy." He was among those who 30 years ago drew attention to the problem of CO_{2} emission in his study, co-authored with Robert-Jan van der Plas, The Residential Sector and CO_{2} Emissions. Industry and Energy Department Paper Series, The World Bank, 1992.

More than anything, Dr. Floor is an Iranologist and is widely known for his numerous books on the country's history and literature. When asked about Iran and Iranians, he mentions, "I don’t think of people, any people, in having best and worst characteristics. Having worked in more than 50 countries all over the world during my 35-year career, I have found that people, wherever they are, are not that much different. What they have in common that they all react to the incentives that they are exposed to, political, economic, religious, etc. For example, if I say that Iranians don’t plan very well, but are masters at improvisation, is that a best or worst characteristic? It all depends on the circumstances and I don’t think it is helpful to contribute to the proliferation of stereotypes of people. Just take them as they are and work with that and you will be surprised to learn that what is considered ‘best and worst’ was based on lack of understanding and empathy."

== Publications ==
Floor's books on Iran could be categorized into energy related publications, Persian Gulf, art, social history, economic history, political history, and medical history. He also has numerous published papers (250 plus) in each categories in reputable journals including, but not limited to International Journal of Energy Research, International Journal of Middle Eastern Studies,The Middle East Journal, Journal of International Affairs, Zeitschrift der Deutschen Morgenländischen Gesellschaft, Die Welt des Islams, Studia Iranica, Iranian Studies, and Journal of the Economic and Social History of the Orient, as well as many entries in the Encyclopedia Irania, Encyclopedia of Islam.

Many people know him for his Persian Gulf book series published by MAGE Publishers. Dr. Floor has published more than 50 odd books. When asked about his most favorite book in a 2017 interview during a visit to Iran, he mentions, "I have no idea what my best book is and have never given this a thought. In fact, I like all my books for the simple reason that I usually write about a subject that I don’t know much or anything about. My books are first and foremost written for myself, because they are the result of my attempt to find out what I can learn about a subject that may just be a term to me. I have written books that initially I intended to be an article, because when I begin my research and start writing I have no pre-set ideas where I want to end up. In short, having researched a subject and learnt more than I knew about it is the best thing."

Some of his books are as follows.

=== Authored Books (Selective) ===
The Persian Gulf: A Political and Economic History of 5 Port Cities, 1500-1730 (2006)

The Persian Gulf: The Rise of the Gulf Arabs, 1747-1792 (2007)

The Persian Gulf: The Rise and Fall of Bandar-e Lengeh (2010)

The Persian Gulf: Bandar Abbas: The Natural Gateway of Southeast Iran (2011)

The Persian Gulf: Links with the Hinterland Bushehr, Borazjan, Kazerun, Banu Ka’b, & Bandar Abbas (2011)

The Persian Gulf: The Hula Arabs of The Shibkuh Coast of Iran (2014)

The Persian Gulf: Dutch-Omani Relations A Commercial & Political History 1651-1806 (2014)

The Persian Gulf: Muscat – City, Society and Trade (2014)

The Persian Gulf: Bushehr: City, State, and Trade, 1797–1947 (2016)

The Persian Gulf: Karkh: The Island’s Untold Story (2017)

Agriculture in Qajar Iran (2003)

Public Health in Qajar Iran (2004)

The History of Theater in Iran (2005)

Travels Through Northern Persia, 1770-1774 (2007)

Titles and Emoluments in Safavid Iran (Titles & Emoluments in Safavid Iran: A Third Manual of Safavid Administration) (2008)

A Social History of Sexual Relations in Iran (2008)

The Rise and Fall of Nader Shah (2009)

Labor and Industry in Iran, 1850-1941 (2009)

Guilds, Merchants and Ulama in 19th Century Iran (2009)

Games Persians Play (2011)

Astrakhan: Anno 1770, Its History, Geography, Population, Trade, Flora, Fauna and Fisheries (2012)

A Man of Two Worlds: Pedros Bedik in Iran, 1670–1675 (2013)

The Monetary History of Iran: From the Safavids to the Qajars (Iran and the Persianate World) (2013)

History of Bread in Iran (2015)

Studies in the History of Medicine in Iran (2018)

Kermanshah: City and Province, 1850–1945 (2018)

Salar al-Dowleh: A Delusional Prince and Wannabe Shah (2018)

Persian Pleasures: How Iranians Relaxed Through the Centuries with Food, Drink and Drugs (2019)

History of Hospitals in Iran, 550–1950 (2020)

=== Translated Books (Selective) ===
Willem Floor has also published several translations in order to provide service to the language-challenged Iranist community. Some of them are as follows.

Samuel Gottlieb Gmelin’s Travels Through Northern Persia 1770–1774

Abbas Qoli Aqa Bakikhanov’s The Heavenly Rose-Garden: A History of Shirvan & Daghestan

Evliya Chelebi’s Travels in Iran and the Caucasus, 1647 and 1654

Hamideh Khanum Javanshir's Awake: A Moslem Woman’s Rare Memoir of Her Life and Partnership with the Editor of Molla Nasreddin, the Most Influential Satirical Journal of the Caucasus and Iran, 1907–1931

Engelbert Kaempfer's Exotic Attractions in Persia, 1684–1688: Travels & Observations
