= Provinces of Iran =

Provinces of Iran استان‌های ایران Ostânhâye Irân
- Also known as: Ostân استان
- Category: Unitary state
- Location: Iran
- Number: 31
- Populations: 591,000 (Ilam province) – 13,323,000 (Tehran province)
- Areas: 5,833 km^{2} (2,252 sq mi) (Alborz province) – 183,285 km^{2} (70,767 sq mi) (Kerman province)
- Government: Provincial government (national government)
- Subdivisions: County

Provinces of Iran by population in 2021

Provinces of Iran by population density in 2013

Map of the Iranian provinces by Human Development Index in 2017 Legend: 0.800 – 1.000 (very high) 0.700 – 0.799 (high) 0.600 – 0.699 (medium)

Provinces of Iran by contribution to national GDP in 2014

Provinces of Iran by GDP per capita in 2012

Iran is subdivided into thirty-one provinces (Persian: استان, romanized: Ostân), which are the first-level administrative divisions of the country. Each province is governed from a local centre, usually the largest local city, which is called the capital (Persian: مرکز, romanized: Markaz) of the province. The provincial authority is headed by a governor-general (Persian: استاندار, romanized: Ostândâr), who is appointed by the Minister of the Interior subject to approval of the cabinet. The provinces are subdivided into counties, districts (Persian: بخش, romanized: bakhsh) and villages.

== Modern history ==
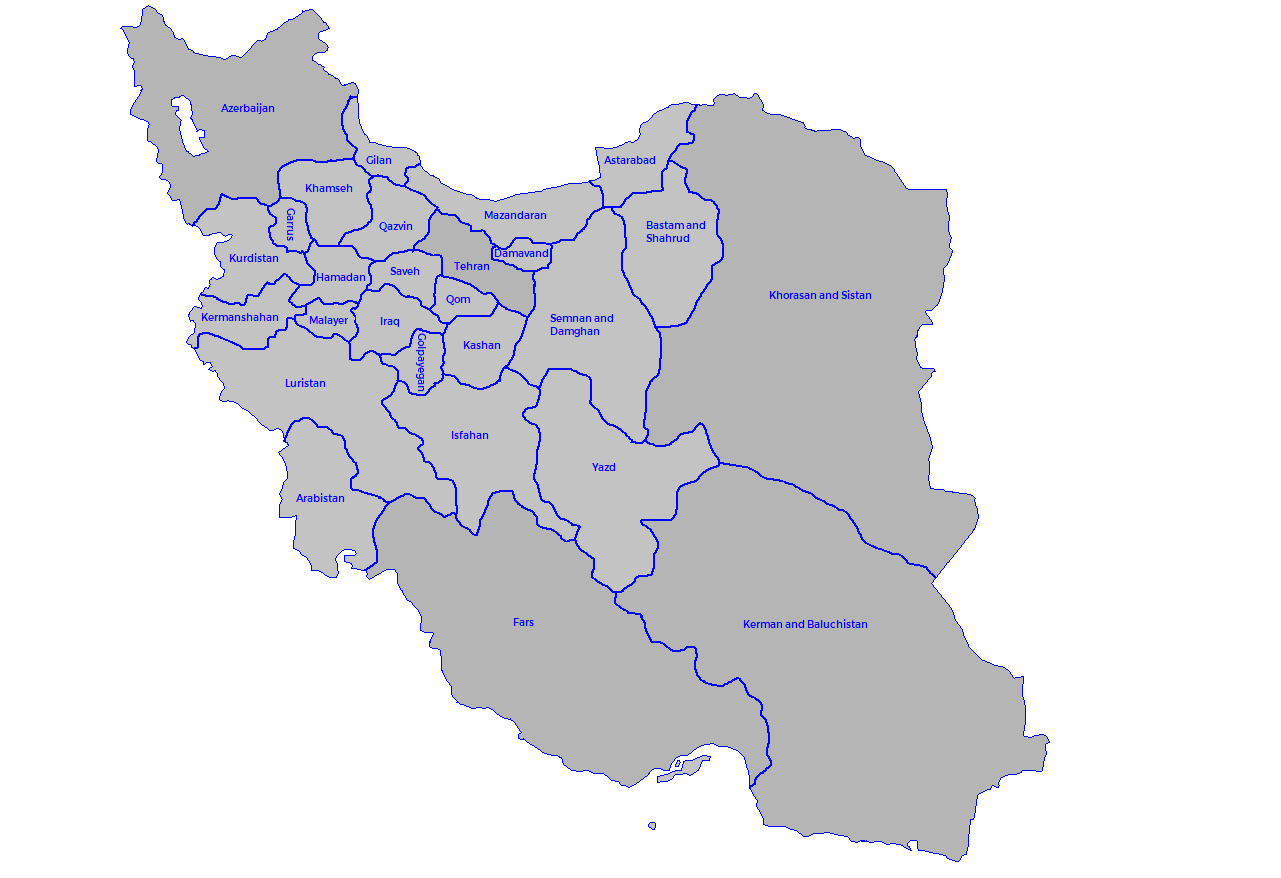
Map of administrative subdivisions of Iran in 1911 – Tehran, eyalats, and velayats

Iran has held its modern territory since the Treaty of Paris in 1857. Prior to 1937, Iran had maintained its feudal administrative divisional structure, dating back to the time the modern state was centralized by the Safavid dynasty in the 16th century, although the boundaries, roles, and rulers changed often. On the eve of the Persian Constitutional Revolution in 1905, Iran was composed of Tehran, being directly ruled by the monarch; four eyalats (Persian: ایالات eyâlât pl., ایالت eyâlat sin.), ruled by Qajar princes; and various velayats (Persian: ولایات velâyât pl., ولایت velayat sin.). Nomadic tribal confederations, such as the Bakhtiari people and Qashqai people, were largely independent of the domestic administrative divisions and were autonomous.

With the Constitutional Revolution, and the formation of the first National Consultative Assembly, Iran's administrative subdivisions were legally defined in 1907. Any change in the boundaries of eyalats, velayats, or their respective sub-districts was banned by the Iranian constitution, except with the passage of a new law by the assembly. Per the 1907 law, the following were defined:

.ماده ۱ ــ مملکت محروسه ایران برای تسهیل امور سیاسی بایالات و ولایات منقسم می‌شود

ماده ۲ ــ ایالت قسمتی از مملکت است که دارای حکومت مرکزی و ولایات حاکم‌نشین جزء است و فعلاً منحصر به چهار ایالت است: آذربایجان، کرمان و بلوچستان، فارس، خراسان

ماده ۳ ــ ولایات قسمتی از مملکت است که دارای یک شهر حاکم‌نشین و توابع باشد اعم از اینکه حکومت آن تابع پایتخت یا تابع مرکز ایالتی باشد
Article 1 – Guarded Domain of Iran, for the facilitation of political affairs, will be subdivided into Eyalats and Velayats

Article 2 – Eyalat is a part of the kingdom which includes a central government and subordinate governor-ruled Velayats and at the moment there only are four Eyalat: Azerbaijan, Kerman and Baluchistan, Fars, Khurasan.

Article 3 – Velayat is a part of the kingdom which includes a governor-residence city and subordinate areas, whether its governance is subordinate to the capital [Tehran], or to the capital of an Eyalat.

On 22 October 1911, the National Consultative Assembly passed another law, titled "The law of Election of National Consultative Assembly" (Persian: قانون انتخابات مجلس شورای ملی). This law presented a complete list of all eyalats and velayats of the country, as well as their constituent districts and cities. This list presented the grouping of various towns and districts into electoral districts for the purpose of the election. According to this law, in 1911, Iran was made up of 27 administrative subdivisions, the region of Tehran, 4 eyalats, and 22 velayats. Below is a list:

Capital city

- Tehran

Eyalats

1. Azerbaijan
2. Pars
3. Kerman and Baluchistan
4. Khorasan and Sistan

Provinces

1. Khuzestan
2. Astarabad (Gorgan)
3. Damavand
4. Gerrus (Bijar)
5. Gilan
6. Golpayegan
7. Hamadan
8. Iraq (Arak)
9. Isfahan
10. Kashan
11. Khamseh (Zanjan)
12. Kermanshahan (Kermanshah)
13. Kurdistan
14. Luristan
15. Malayer
16. Mazandaran
17. Qazvin
18. Qom
19. Saveh
20. Semnan and Damghan
21. Shahrud and Bastam
22. Yazd

In 1937, Iran was reorganized to form ten numbered provinces with subordinate governorates: Gilan, Mazandaran, East Azerbaijan, West Azerbaijan, Kermanshah, Khuzestan, Pars, Kerman, Khorasan, and Isfahan.

Iran has had a historical claim to Bahrain as its 14th province: Bahrain province, which was under British colonial occupation until 1971. Prior to 1957, Bahrain was placed under Pars province. During the Safavid era, Bahrain was subordinate to Bushehr governorship and Zubarah (located in modern-day country of Qatar) was its capital city. In 1737, during the Afsharid era, Bahrain was made subject to Pars governorship. This claim was reasserted by the new theocratic Iranian leadership after 1979 with the famous 1981 coup attempt that occurred.

From 1960 to 1981, the governorates were gradually raised to provincial status one by one. Since then several new provinces have been created, most recently in 2010 when the new Alborz province was split from Tehran province, and before that in 2004 when the province of Khorasan was divided into three provinces.

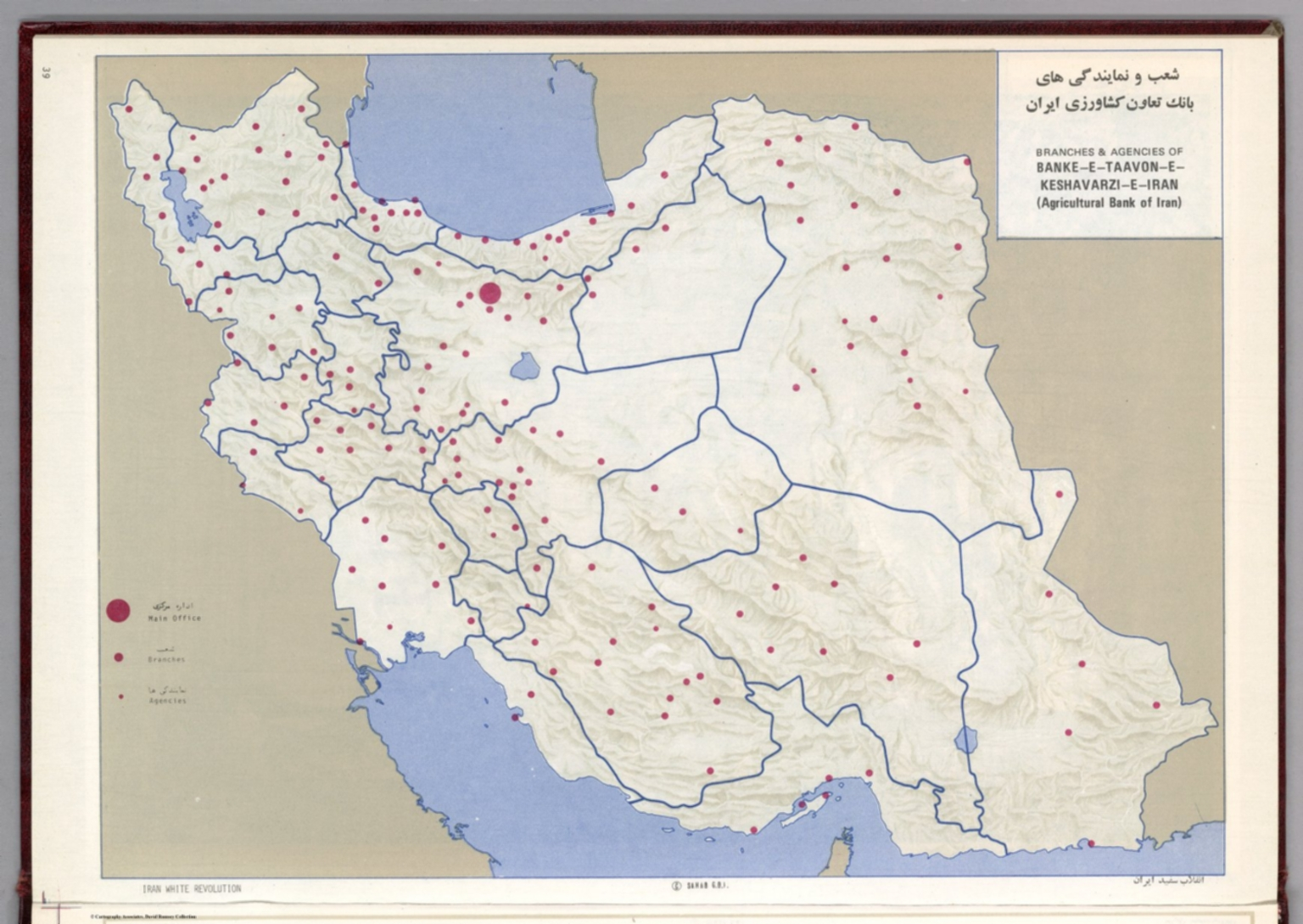
23 provinces of Iran in 1974

Map of the 31 provinces of Iran

== Provinces by population and GDP ==
According to Donya-e-Eqtesad, between 2017 and 2019, some 11 of the 20 poorest Iranian cities were in the province of Sistan and Baluchestan. Three other markedly poor cities were located in Kerman province.

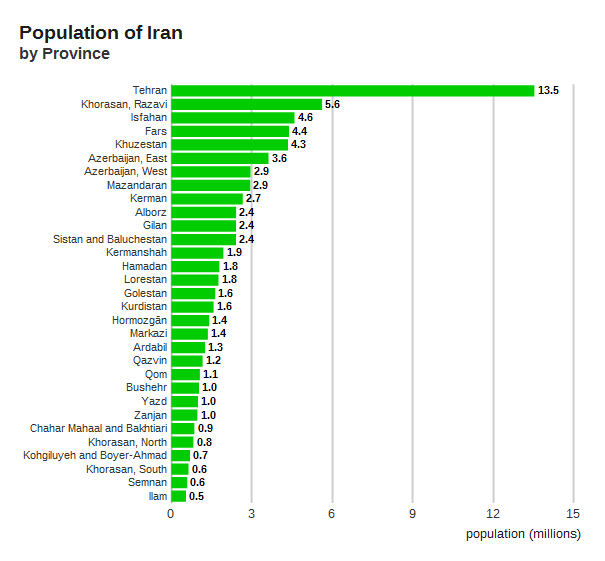
Iran population broken down by province

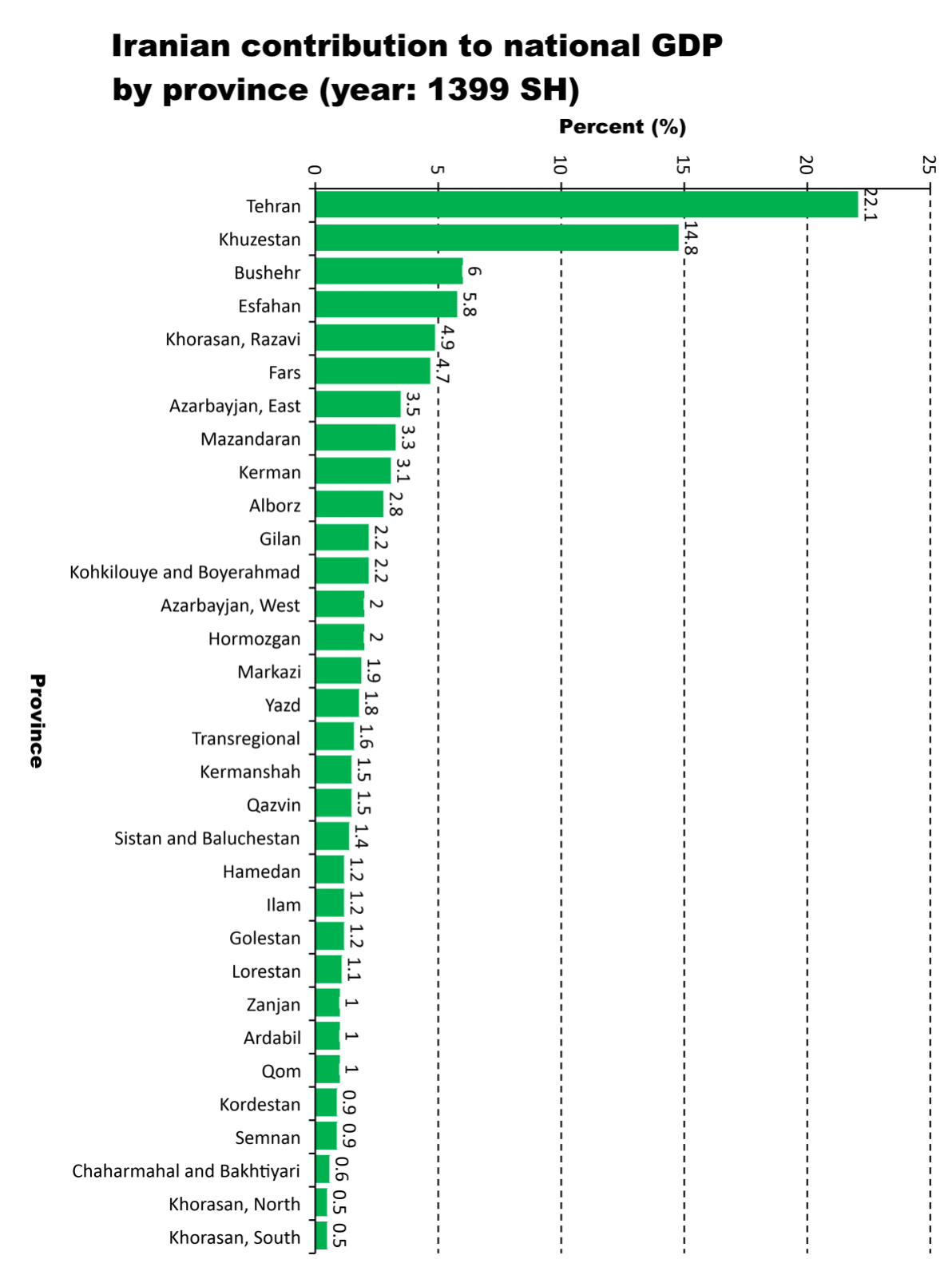

== Current provinces ==
Iranian provinces along with additional information and statistics
Province	Abbreviation	Capital	Population (2023)	Area (km^{2})	Population density (/km^{2})	Counties	Notes	Map
Alborz	AL	Karaj	2,730,000	5,833	465.01	7	Until 23 June 2010, it was part of Tehran province.	
Ardabil	AR	Ardabil	1,284,000	17,800	71.37	12	Until 1993, it was part of East Azerbaijan province.	
Bushehr	BU	Bushehr	1,174,000	22,743	51.15	10	Originally part of Pars province. Until 1977, it was known as Khalij-e Pars (Persian Gulf).	
Chaharmahal and Bakhtiari	CB	Shahr-e Kord	973,000	16,332	58.03	12	Until 1973, it was part of Isfahan province.	
East Azerbaijan	EA	Tabriz	3,925,000	45,650	85.64	23		
Fars	FA	Shiraz	4,904,000	122,608	39.57	37		
Gilan	GN	Rasht	2,546,000	14,042	180.22	17		
Golestan	GO	Gorgan	1,893,000	20,195	92.53	14	On 31 May 1997, the counties of Aliabad, Gonbad-e Kavus, Gorgan, Kordkuy, Minudasht, and Torkaman were separated from Mazandaran province to form Golestan province. Gorgan was known as Esteraba or Astarabad until 1937.	
Hamadan	HA	Hamadan	1,756,000	19,368	90.78	10	Originally part of Kermanshah province.	
Hormozgan	HO	Bandar Abbas	1,806,000	70,669	25.14	13	Originally part of Kerman province. Until 1977, the province was known as Banader va Jazayer-e Bahr-e Oman (Ports and Islands of the Sea of Oman).	
Ilam	IL	Ilam	591,000	20,133	28.82	12	Originally part of Kermanshah province.	
Isfahan	IS	Isfahan	5,136,000	107,029	47.85	28	In 1986, some parts of Markazi province were transferred to Isfahan, Semnan, and Zanjan provinces.	
Kerman	KN	Kerman	3,184,000	183,285	17.27	25		
Kermanshah	KE	Kermanshah	2,003,000	24,998	78.10	14	Between 1950 and 1979, both Kermanshah province and city were known as Kermanshahan, and between 1979 and 1995 as Bakhtaran.	
Khuzestan	KH	Ahvaz	4,725,000	64,055	73.54	30		
Kohgiluyeh and Boyer-Ahmad	KB	Yasuj	728,000	15,504	45.99	9	Originally part of Khuzestan province. Until 1990, the province was known as Bovir Ahmadi and Kohkiluyeh.	
Kurdistan	KU	Sanandaj	1,614,000	29,137	55.02	10	Originally part of Gilan province.	
Lorestan	LO	Khorramabad	1,784,000	28,294	62.23	12	Originally part of Khuzestan province.	
Markazi	MA	Arak	1,436,000	29,130	49.07	12	Originally part of Mazandaran province. In 1986, some parts of Markazi province were transferred to Isfahan, Semnan, and Zanjan provinces.	
Mazandaran	MN	Sari	3,302,000	23,701	138.54	22		
North Khorasan	NK	Bojnord	868,000	28,434	30.35	10	On 29 September 2004, Khorasan province was divided into three provinces: North Khorasan, Razavi Khorasan, and South Khorasan.	
Qazvin	QA	Qazvin	1,284,000	15,549	81.92	6	On 31 December 1996, the counties of Qazvin and Takestan were separated from Zanjan province to form Qazvin province.	
Qom	QM	Qom	1,300,000	11,526	112.12	3	Until 1995, Qom was a county of Tehran province.	
Razavi Khorasan	RK	Mashhad	6,444,000	118,884	54.12	34	On 29 September 2004, Khorasan province was divided into three provinces: North Khorasan, Razavi Khorasan, and South Khorasan.	
Semnan	SE	Semnan	715,000	97,491	7.20	8	Originally part of Mazandaran province. In 1986, some parts of Markazi province were transferred to Isfahan, Semnan, and Zanjan provinces.	
Sistan and Baluchestan	SB	Zahedan	2,777,000	180,726	15.35	26	Until 1986, the province was known as Baluchestan and Sistan.	
South Khorasan	SK	Birjand	786,000	151,913	5.06	12	On 29 September 2004, Khorasan province was divided into three provinces: North Khorasan, Razavi Khorasan, and South Khorasan.	
Tehran	TE	Tehran	13,323,000	18,814	705.20	16	Until 1986, Tehran was part of Markazi province.	
West Azerbaijan	WA	Urmia	3,278,000	37,437	87.22	20	During the Pahlavi dynasty, Urmia was known as Rezaiyeh.	
Yazd	YA	Yazd	1,156,000	76,469	14.89	12	Originally part of Isfahan province. In 1986, part of Kerman province was transferred to Yazd province. In 2002, Tabas County (area: 55,344 km^{2}) was transferred from Khorasan province to Yazd province.	
Zanjan	ZA	Zanjan	1,103,000	21,773	48.57	8	Originally part of Gilan province. In 1986, some parts of Markazi province were transferred to Isfahan, Semnan, and Zanjan provinces.	
Iran (total)	IR	Tehran	80,528,000	1,628,554 km^{2} (628,788 sq mi)	49.078	484		

== Provincial abbreviations ==
Table below shows the provinces' abbreviation, which can be used in postal addresses and academic affiliations for the sake of simplicity.

Province	Abbreviation	Method
Alborz	AL	First two letters
Ardabil	AR	First two letters
Azerbaijan, East	EA	First two words
Azerbaijan, West	WA	First two words
Bushehr	BU	First two letters
Chaharmahal and Bakhtiari	CB	First two words
Pars	FA	First two letters
Gilan	GI	First two letters
Golestan	GO	First two letters
Hamadan	HA	First two letters
Hormozgan	HO	First two letters
Ilam	IL	First two letters
Isfahan	IS	First two letters
Kerman	KE	First two letters
Kermanshah	KS	First two words
Khorasan, North	NK	First two words
Khorasan, Razavi	RK	First two words
Khorasan, South	SK	First two words
Khuzestan	KH	First two letters
Kohgiluyeh and Boyer-Ahmad	KB	First two words
Kurdistan	KU	First two letters
Lorestan	LO	First two letters
Markazi	MA	First two letters
Mazandaran	MN	First and last letter
Qazvin	QA	First two letters
Qom	QO	First two letters
Semnan	SE	First two letters
Sistan and Baluchestan	SB	First two words
Tehran	TE	First two letters
Yazd	YA	First two letters
Zanjan	ZA	First two letters

== Historical provinces ==
- Khorasan province
- Bahrain province

=== Safavid Dynasty ===
The Tadhkirat Al-Muluk, a work made circa 1725 (1137) which details the Safavid administration mentions that Iran had four territories governed by Valis: (Arabistan, Luristan, Georgia and Kurdistan).

And thirteen provinces governed by Beglarbegis: (Azarbayjan (also called Tabriz Province), Chukhur-i Sa'd, Qarabagh-Ganja, Shirvan, Astarabad, Mashhad, Marv, Herat, Qandahar, Kirman, Kuh-Giluya, Qazvin and Hamadan).

In other places such as Isfahan (the capital) and nearby regions, Yazd, Mazandaran, Gilan, Saveh, Shiraz and many districts of Persian Iraq, they were administered by the Khāssa, the central royal branch of the government; in opposition to the provincial Mamālik government branch.

== See also ==
- List of current Iran governors-general
- List of Iranian provinces by Human Development Index
- Administrative divisions of Iran
  - Regions of Iran
  - Counties of Iran
- Geography of Iran
- ISO 3166-2:IR
