= Mohammad Hossein Khan of Shaki =

Mohammad Hossein Khan (died 1615) was a Safavid official and military leader, who briefly served as governor of Shaki in the Shirvan province, during the reign of king (shah) Abbas I (r. 1588–1629).

He was appointed as governor of Shaki around the time of Abbas I's punitive campaign in Georgia. He was a descendant of the Shirvanshahs, and also functioned as the head of the Turkoman Zhul-Qadr tribe in Iraq and the Azerbaijan province, as his mother hailed from the tribe. In 1615, during the revolt in Georgia against the Safavid rule, Mohammad Hossein Khan was killed.

== Sources ==
- Floor, Willem; Herzig, Edmund, eds. (2012). Iran and the World in the Safavid Age. I.B.Tauris. ISBN 978-1850439301.
