= Safavid occupation of Basra =

Occupation of the city of Basra (1697–1701)

- 1697–1701
- Flag

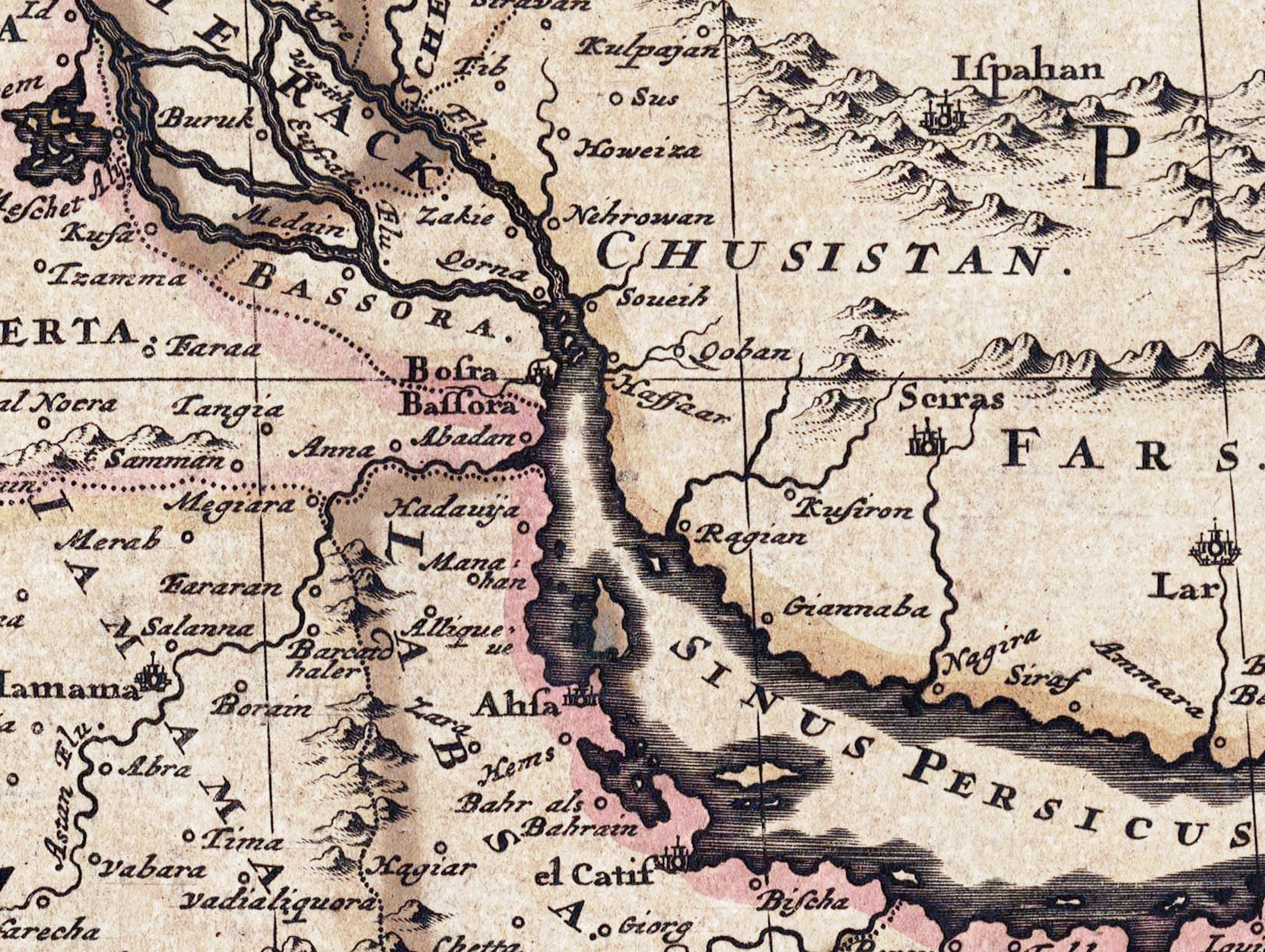
- Basra (Bassora) on a 1688 map created by Justus Danckerts
- Status: Military occupation
- Capital: Basra
- Religion: Islam
- Historical era: Early modern period
  - Established: 26 March 1697
  - Disestablished: 9 March 1701
Preceded by	Succeeded by
Basra Eyalet	Basra Eyalet
- Today part of: Iraq

The Safavid occupation of Basra (1697–1701) took place between 26 March 1697 and 9 March 1701. It was the second time that the important Persian Gulf city had fallen to Safavid Iran.

Basra, located in present-day Iraq, had already been under Safavid control from 1508 to 1524, when it was lost upon Shah Ismail I's death. In the ensuing period, the Ottoman Empire, rivals of the Safavids, managed to establish nominal rule over the city. De facto rule of Basra remained in the hands of the local Arab Al-Mughamis tribe, a branch of the Banu'l-Muntafiq. In 1596, the Ottoman governor of Basra, Ali Pasha, sold his office to a local named Afrasiyab. Over the next c. 70 years, Basra was considered a hereditary eyalet under Afrasiyab and his descendants.

The Safavid attempts to retake Basra in 1624, 1625, and 1628–1629 proved unsuccessful, through a combination of Imperial Portuguese interference, pressing concerns on other fronts and, finally, Shah Abbas the Great's (r. 1588–1629) death. Basra continued to be pulled towards the Safavids due to geographical and economic reasons. Issues related to pilgrimage, uneasy Ottoman relations with the rulers of Basra, and unrest in the southern part of Ottoman-held Iraq continued to irk the Safavids and prompt Safavid involvement in southern Iraq. When the Safavids were allowed to regain territory in Iraq under Shah Suleiman I (r. 1666–1694) however, they did not act. For instance, in 1667, when the Ottomans conducted a punitive expedition to Basra, its ruler Husayn Pasha of the Afrasiyab dynasty evacuated the city's population to Safavid territory and offered control of Basra to the Safavids. Shah Suleiman I dismissed Husayn Pasha's pleas as he did not want to antagonize the Ottomans.

In 1690, plague and famine led to tribal unrest among the Muntafiqs in southern Iraq. In 1695, the local Arab tribal leader Shaykh Mane ibn Mughamis led his tribesmen in a revolt against the Ottomans. Shaykh Mane and his men gained control of Basra with the support of 5000 members of the Musha'sha', a heterodox Shi'i sect. In 1697, members of the Musha'sha' loyal to Farajollah Khan, the Safavid-appointed governor of Safavid Arabestan, defeated Shaykh Mane and his men, ousting them from the city. The Safavid government realized that Shaykh Mane and his men were keen to retake Basra and wanted to attack nearby Hoveyzeh, the capital of Arabestan Province. This time, the Safavids, under Soltan Hoseyn (r. 1694–1722), reacted by sending a force led by Ali Mardan Khan to Basra. On 26 March 1697, the troops sent by the Safavid government took control of the city. However, the Safavids were concerned about the weakened state of their military and did not want to disrupt the peace with the Ottomans. This, in combination with continued pressure by Shaykh Mane and his tribesmen on Basra, eventually led the Safavids to decide to return Basra to Ottoman control. On 9 March 1701, the Safavid forces withdrew from Basra, and on 10 March the Ottomans retook control of the city.

== Background ==
=== Geopolitical significance of Basra ===
Basra was of particular geopolitical importance in the 16th and 17th centuries, being on the border between the rival (Sunni) Ottoman and (Shi'i) Safavid empires, on the frontier of the Arabian Desert, and having a pivotal role in the growth of the Indian Ocean trade. As a result, possession of Basra was contested between the Ottomans and Safavids. Although the two empires claimed jurisdiction over the city at various times, their authority was nominal for the most part, with de facto control being in the hands of local governors who ruled under Safavid or Ottoman suzerainty. During this period, large parts of present-day Iraq were made unsafe by the depredations of the semi-nomadic and "fiercely independent" Arabs in the south and Kurds in the north, who attacked passing caravans. The weather in the Sawad was harmful to health, with plagues and killer epidemics contributing to turbulent periods in Basra's history. Nevertheless, Basra became an important traffic hub for the Persian Gulf area, both for merchants and for pilgrims en route to Mecca and Medina.

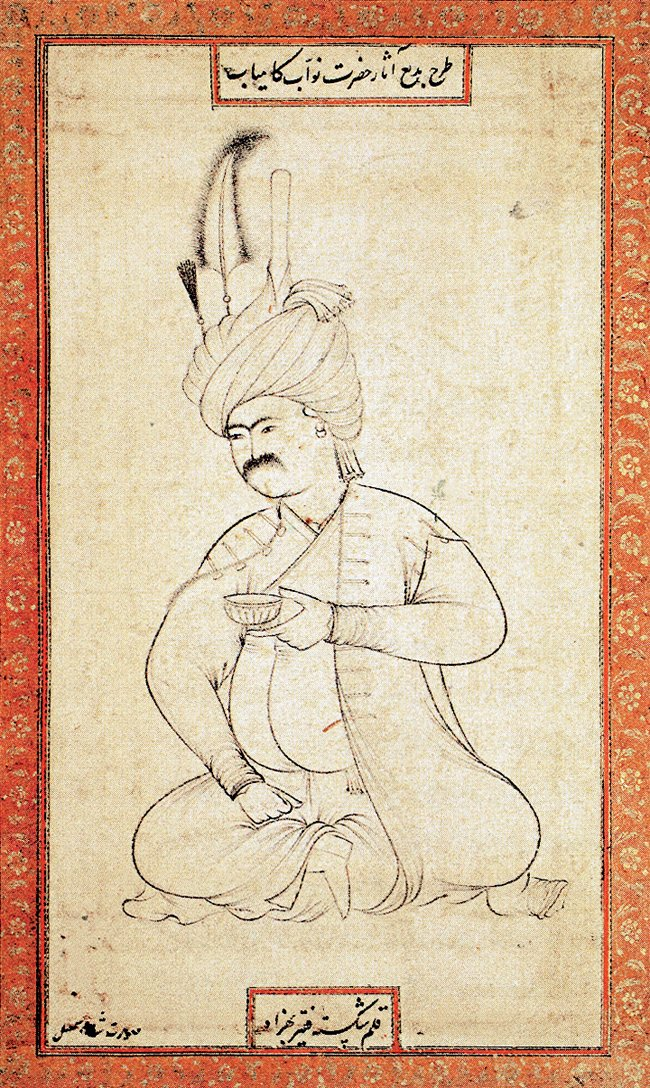
Posthumous copy of a contemporary portrait of Shah Ismail I by Kamāl ud-Dīn Behzād. Topkapi Palace Museum Library.

=== From the 16th to the 17th century ===
The Bedouin Arab tribe of al-Mughamis, a branch of the Banu'l-Muntafiq inhabiting the area between Kufa and Basra, established their rule over Basra in the early fifteenth century. From 1436 to 1508 de facto control was in the hands of the Musha'sha', a tribal confederation of radical Shi'ites found mainly on the edges of the marshes at the border of the Safavid province of Arabestan (present-day Khuzestan).

In 1508, during the reign of the first Safavid ruler, Ismail I (r. 1501–1524), Basra and the Musha'sha' became part of the Safavid Empire. (Note: According to Willem Floor (2008), a certain Shaykh Afrasiyab (the local ruler of Basra, not to be mistaken with the later Afrasiyab of Basra) came to Shiraz in 1504 to pledge his allegiance to Ismail I. Ismail I in turn confirmed him in his possessions and position as governor (vali) of Basra.) The Musha'sha' proved to be valuable allies to the Safavids, often acting as Safavid proxies in campaigns against the Arabs of southern Iraq and Basra, led by a Safavid-appointed governor. Although nominally Safavid subjects, they had broad autonomy, and their territory served as a buffer zone between the Safavids and the Ottomans.

In 1524, following Ismail I's death, the Al-Mughamis resumed effective control. Twelve years later, during the Ottoman–Safavid War of 1532–1555, the ruler of Basra, Rashid ibn Mughamis, acknowledged the Ottoman sultan Suleiman the Magnificent (r. 1520–1566) as his suzerain, who in turn confirmed him as governor of the city. Though Basra submitted to the Ottomans, the Ottoman hold over Basra was initially tenuous. This changed in 1546, when an Ottoman garrison was installed in the city after a Musha'sha' uprising.

Despite being supplanted by the Ottomans as rulers of Iraq, the Safavids never gave up their claim to it, at least in court rhetoric. In reality, most of Iraq was foreign territory to the Safavids, even though the south was inhabited by many Shi'ites. As the modern historian Rudi Matthee explains,

The area was difficult to defend, cut off as it was from the central Persian plateau by the Zagros mountain range. The Sawad, the Mesopotamian floodplain, was hot, humid, and unhealthy, and a frequent incubator of killer epidemics. The flat semi-desert land was inhospitable terrain for Qizilbash warriors used to the high plains and mountains of the Persian heartland and eastern Anatolia. Their preference for guerilla tactics, the ambush and the quick dash followed by retreat into the mountains, as opposed to open confrontation on the battlefield did not serve them well in Iraq with its alluvial flatlands and swamps.

=== From the 17th to the 18th century ===
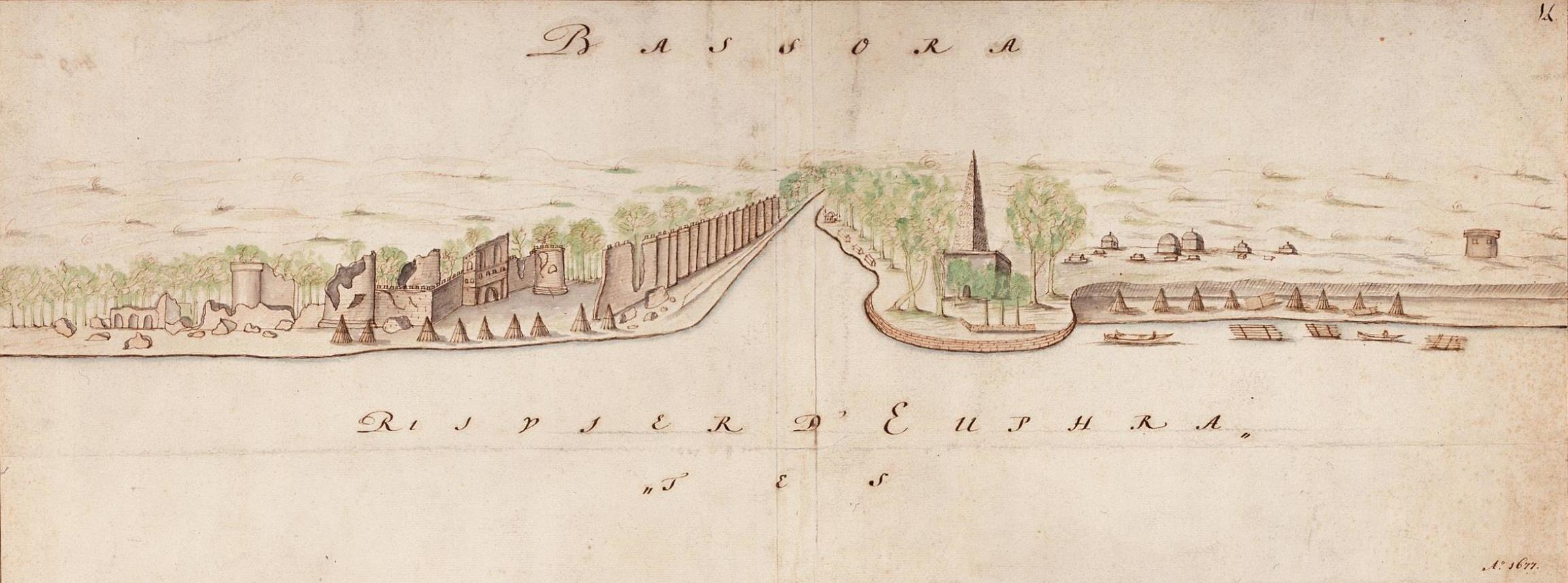
View of Basra by Isaak de Graaf. Created c. 1695 after the situation in 1677

In 1596 the Ottoman governor sold Basra to a certain Afrasiyab, a local magnate descended from the Sunni Seljuq dynasty. From then until 1668, Basra was considered a hereditary eyalet under the Afrasiyab family.

During this period, the Safavid Shah Abbas the Great (r. 1588–1629) made a number of attempts to capture Basra, a major rival for his own commercial port city of Bandar Abbas, and a base for the Portuguese traders in the region. The Safavid attempts in 1624, 1625, and 1628–1629 during the War of 1623–1639 proved unsuccessful, through a combination of Portuguese interference, pressing concerns on other fronts and, finally, Abbas' death.

Though the Safavids acknowledged Ottoman rule over Iraq in the Treaty of Zuhab (1639), they were occasionally tempted to attempt to regain it, for instance after the Ottoman defeat at Vienna in 1683. More cautious and conservative factions, aware of the decline in Safavid military strength, prevailed against it. Relations remained fraught around Basra due to the continuous harassment of Iranian pilgrims by the Ottoman authorities, so that the Safavids even prohibited the passage of pilgrims on several occasions. Furthermore, upheavals in southern Iraq continued to spill over the border into Safavid territory. Thus in 1667, when Husayn Pasha of the Afrasiyab dynasty refused to acknowledge the suzerainty of the Sultan and the Ottomans sent a punitive expedition against him, Husayn Pasha evacuated the entire population to Safavid territory while offering the city to the Safavids. Shah Suleiman I (r. 1666–1694), however, dismissed Husayn Pasha's pleas as he did not want to antagonize the Ottomans, and in 1668, the Ottoman governor of Baghdad established direct control over Basra.

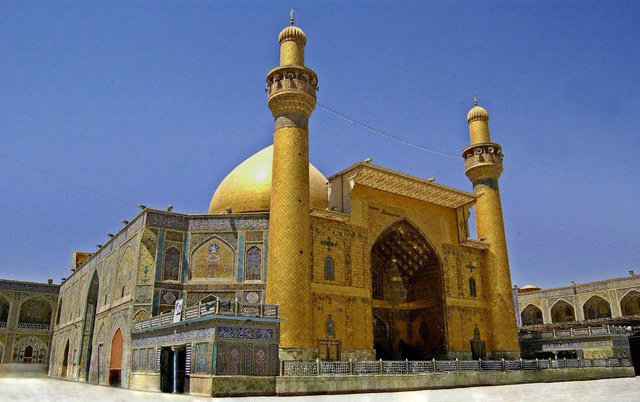
The Imam Ali Shrine in Najaf, pictured in 2012

Basra was also drawn to the Safavids for economic reasons: in the mid to late 17th century, Safavid abbasi and panj shahi coins were the most commonly used coins in Basra. Under Suleiman I's successor, Hoseyn (r. 1694–1722), Safavid policy in relation to regaining Iraq did not change. Matthee claimed "this is hardly surprising", given that the Safavid army was weak at the time and the Shah himself was famous for his unassertive nature. Unlike most of his predecessors, Soltan Hoseyn actively encouraged pilgrims to visit the Shi'ite holy shrines in Iraq, which they did in unprecedented numbers. Hoseyn was also willing to spend the resources of the Safavid state for the upkeep of the shrines in Iraq.

== Prelude ==
The turn of the 18th century saw greater turmoil and renewed Safavid involvement in southern Iraq. In 1690, an outbreak of plague and famine led to tribal unrest amongst the Al-Muntafiq tribe in southern Iraq. Led by Shaykh Mane ibn Mughamis, the Muntafiq Arabs revolted against the Ottomans. The Ottoman government conducted a punitive campaign but was unable to put down Shaykh Mane's revolt. In 1695, Shaykh Mane captured Basra with the help of the local population and ousted the Ottoman governor and troops. During his short-lived tenure as ruler of Basra, he was considered to be relatively benevolent. The Safavids were not especially pleased with this turn of events. Not only had the rebels seized control of an important city on the Safavid border—they had also plundered a number of pilgrim caravans near Basra during their capture of the city. To the Safavids, this proved that Shaykh Mane held expansionist ambitions and might pose a danger to their interests. The Safavid-appointed vali ("viceroy", "governor") of neighbouring Arabestan province, Farajollah Khan, was also concerned about the links between the Musha'sha' and Shaykh Mane. Some 5,000 dissatisfied members of the Musha'sha', followers of his nephew Sayyed Mahmud, had assisted Shaykh Mane in the capture of Basra in 1695. Just two years later, in 1697, Farajollah Khan and his loyal Musha'sha' clashed with Shaykh Mane and his Musha'sha' sympathisers.

== Safavid control: 1697–1701 ==
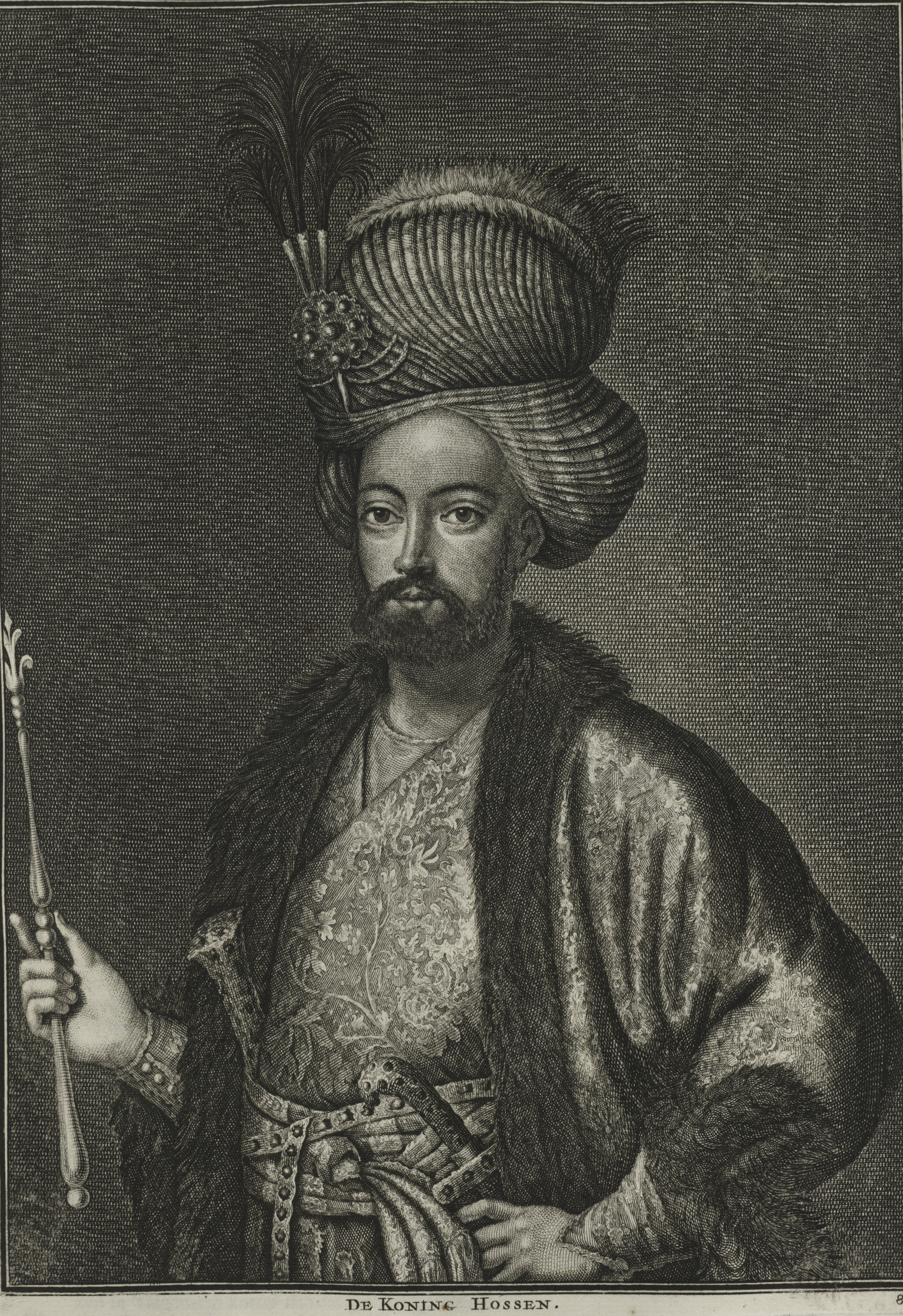
1703 portrait of Soltan Hoseyn by Cornelis de Bruijn

Farajollah Khan and his loyal Musha'sha' emerged victorious and captured Basra in name of the Safavid Shah, prompting Shaykh Mane to flee. When the Safavids realized that Shaykh Mane and his tribesmen were keen to retake Basra, (Note: Indeed, Shaykh Mane had regrouped and gathered support from various Arab tribes, including the Banu Khalid, the Fudul and the Rabi'a.) and even wanted to attack Hoveyzeh, the provincial capital of Arabestan Province, Shah Soltan Hoseyn issued a farman (a decree), ordering an army from the Safavid province of Lorestan led by Ali Mardan Khan, chief of the Fayli tribe and the governor of Kohgiluyeh, to move on Basra. On 26 March 1697 regular Safavid troops took control of the city, and Ali Mardan Khan was appointed governor. This marked the start of the second period of Safavid control of Basra. Later that year, Ali Mardan Khan was replaced by Ebrahim Khan, the governor of Dawraq (modern-day Shadegan, Khuzestan).

Though the Safavids had established control over Basra, they refrained from laying "full and definitive claim" to the city. Soltan Hoseyn's government was still concerned not to disrupt the peace with the Ottomans. Furthermore, they were aware of Iran's military weakness at the time and realized it would be "difficult to hold on to a city located in an extremely volatile region". The activities of the Kurdish rebel Suleiman Baba, who had captured the town of Ardalan and the fortress of Urmia near the Ottoman border in the same year, reinforced their concerns. In late 1697, Shaykh Mane, having made peace with his former enemy Farajollah Khan, (Note: Farajollah Khan had been dismissed as vali of Arabestan around the same time by the central Safavid government for his role in the occupation of Basra.) and assisted by Musha'sha' defectors, defeated a large Safavid force near the fortress of Khurma (Khorma) and captured their general. This forced Soltan Hoseyn to offer the Basra to the Ottomans. Soltan Hoseyn had keys made of pure gold and sent Rostam Khan Zanganeh as ambassador to Constantinople, to hand them over to the Ottoman Sultan Mustafa II (r. 1695–1703), in a symbolic gesture offering the city to Ottoman control. However, although the Safavids continued showing a willingness to return Basra to the Ottomans and entertained an Ottoman embassy in Isfahan between December 1698 and April 1699, Basra would stay in Safavid hands until 1701. (Note: In the letter given by Mustafa II to the Shah (carried by the embassy), the Ottoman sultan apparently "had not responded to the question of whether or not he wished to recover Basra. Instead, he was said to have ordered the governor of Baghdad to go reclaim the city, and rumour had it that Suleiman Baba was enlisted in the efforts as well".)

In early 1700, Shaykh Mane reappeared before the city of Basra and demanded 500 tomans from its Safavid governor, Ebrahim Khan. The governor, who was short of troops, bought Shaykh Mane off by paying 300 tomans and was reinforced by 6,000 soldiers from the province of Kohgiluyeh. The Arab forces continued to pressure the city, which prompted the Shah to recall Ebrahim Khan later that year and replace him with Davud Khan, the former governor of Al-Qurna. Subsequently, the Arabs blockaded Basra, which caused a famine. This situation continued into 1701. By February of that year, the 6,000-strong Safavid garrison, demoralized by lack of pay and the news that a massive Ottoman army was heading for Basra, revolted against the Safavid governor and looted numerous properties in Basra. The Ottoman army reached Basra on 9 March 1701, demanding the Safavids surrender. Davud Khan and the Safavid troops in Basra left the city and boarded ships that had been kept at the ready. On 10 March 1701, the newly appointed Ottoman governor, Ali Pasha, entered Basra accompanied by the Ottoman governors of Baghdad, Sivas and Kirkuk, as well as some 30,000 Ottoman soldiers.

== Assessment ==
Matthee notes that it remains unclear "how Basra fared under the Iranians" in 1697–1701, as contemporary sources "voice no consensus about the issue". Some eyewitnesses insisted that Basra was well governed by the Iranians and hail both Ali Mardan Khan and Ebrahim Khan as "just rulers who showed concern for the people". According to resident Carmelites (members of a Roman Catholic mendicant order) in Basra the city prospered under the beneficent rule of these two Safavid governors, while according to the Scottish sea captain Alexander Hamilton the Iranians encouraged trade and were kind to foreign merchants, unlike the Turks. However, in 1700 the Dutch East India Company stated that Basra had declined under the Safavids and that trade had diminished.

== Sources ==
- Floor, Willem (2008). Titles and Emoluments in Safavid Iran: A Third Manual of Safavid Administration, by Mirza Naqi Nasiri. Washington, DC: Mage Publishers. ISBN 978-1933823232.
- Longrigg, Steven Helmsley; Lang, Katherine H. (2015). "Basra since the Mongol Conquest". In Fleet, Kate; Krämer, Gudrun; Matringe, Denis; Nawas, John; Rowson, Everett (eds.). Encyclopaedia of Islam (3rd ed.). Brill Online. ISSN 1873-9830.
- Matthee, Rudi (2006a). "Between Arabs, Turks and Iranians: The Town of Basra, 1600–1700". Bulletin of the School of Oriental and African Studies, University of London. 69 (1): 53–78. doi:10.1017/S0041977X06000036. JSTOR 20181989. S2CID 159935186.
- Matthee, Rudi (2006b). "Iraq iv. Relations in the Safavid period". Encyclopaedia Iranica (Vol. XIII, Fasc. 5 and Vol. XIII, Fasc. 6). New York. pp. 556–561.
