= Basra Eyalet =

Administrative division of the Ottoman Empire from 1538 to 1862

Arabic: إيالة البصرة Ottoman Turkish: ایالت بصره
- Eyalet of the Ottoman Empire
- 1538–1862
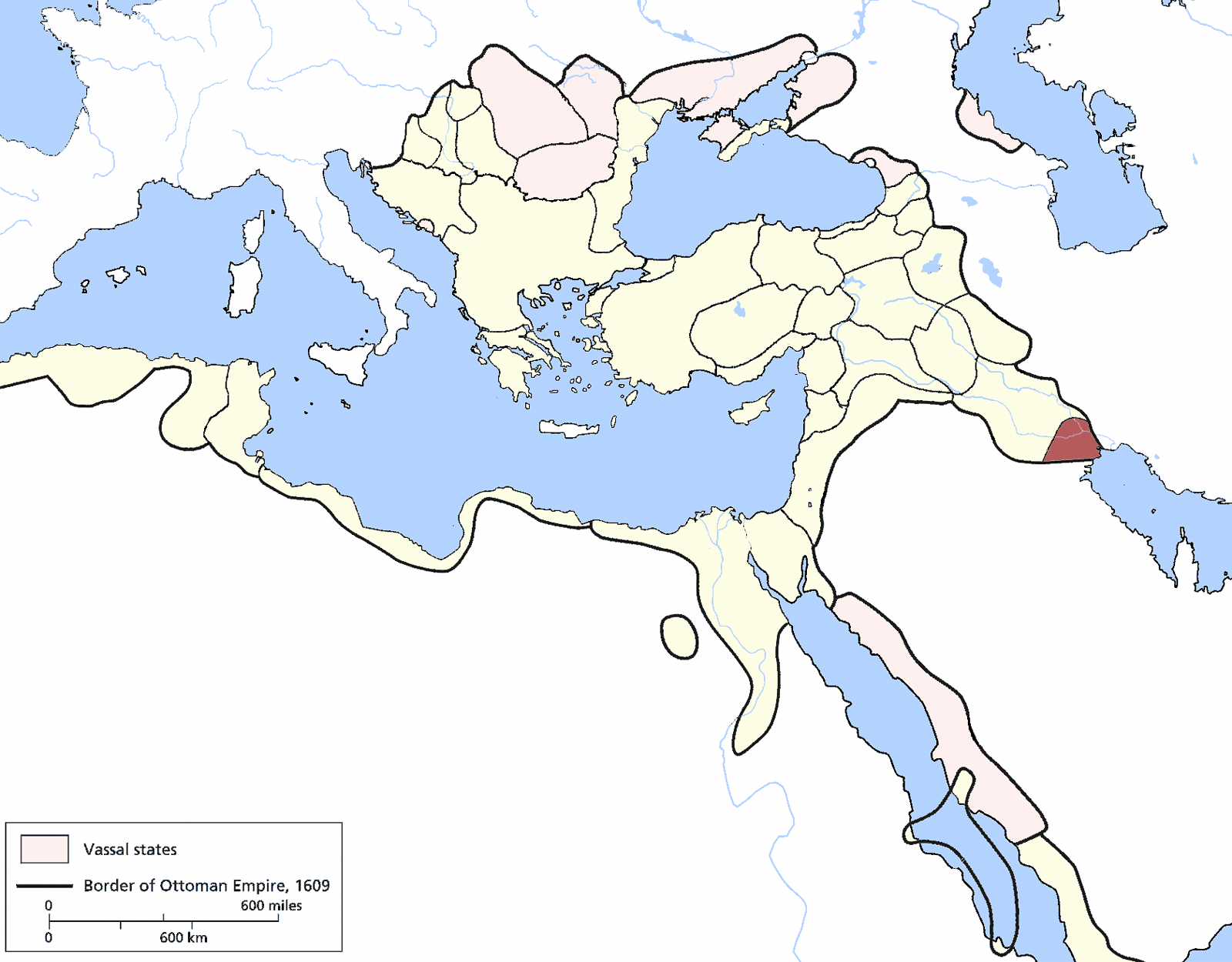
- The Basra Eyalet in 1609
- Capital: Basra
- History
  - Established: 1538
  - Disestablished: 1862
Preceded by	Succeeded by
Safavid dynasty	Basra Vilayet
- Today part of: Iraq

Basra Eyalet (Arabic: إيالة البصرة, Ottoman Turkish: ایالت بصره, romanized: Eyālet-i Baṣrâ) was an eyalet in Ottoman Iraq of the Ottoman Empire. Its reported area in the 19th century was 9,872 square miles (25,570 km^{2}). It had a Defterdar and Kehiya of the Chavushes but neither Alai-beg nor Cheribashi because there were no ziamets or Timars, the lands being all rented by the governor.

== History ==
Basra had formerly a hereditary government (mulkiat), but it was reduced to an ordinary eyalet when conquered by Sultan Mehmed IV. In 1534, when the Ottomans captured Baghdad, Rashid al-Mughamis, the Bedouin emir who then controlled Basra, submitted to Ottomans. Basra became an Ottoman province in 1538, and an Ottoman governor was appointed by 1546. The eyalet was later subordinated to Baghdad during the Mamluk dynasty of Iraq, and was separated from Baghdad again from 1850 to 1862.

== Administrative divisions ==
The eyalet of Basra consisted of the following sanjaks in 1702:

1. Sanjak of Basra (Seat of the Pasha)
2. Sanjak of Kıyab
3. Sanjak of Badiye
4. Sanjak of Sabusne, Gaffât, Mensûr and Batna
5. Sanjak of Seremle
6. Sanjak of Şuş
7. Sanjak of Gazan, Resle and Safiyye
8. Sanjak of Ceğar

== See also ==
- Safavid occupation of Basra (1697–1701)
