= Bahrain province =

Province of the Imperial State of Iran

Bahrain Province استان بحرین (Persian)
- Province of Imperial State of Iran
- 1957–1971
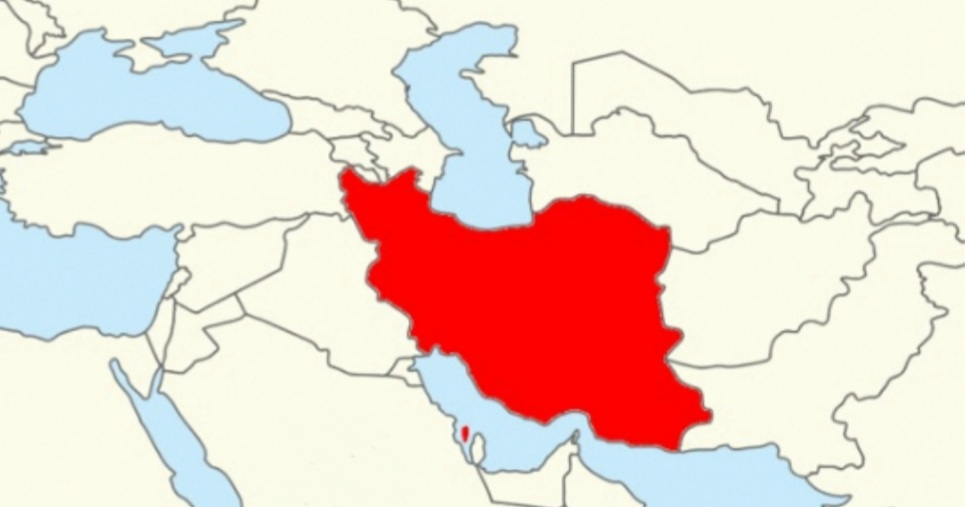
- Demonym: Bahraini
- Area
- 785.08 km^{2} (303.12 sq mi)
  - Type: Province
- History
  - Established: 12 November 1957
  - Disestablished: 18 May 1971
Succeeded by
Bahrain
- Today part of: Bahrain

Bahrain Province (Persian: استان بحرین), also known as the 14th Province and Mishmahig, was a de jure province in the administrative divisions of Iran between 1957 and 1971, that encompassed Bahrain archipelago (part of the present-day country Bahrain). During this period, Bahrain was under effective control of the Persian Gulf Residency and Iran regarded it under British colonial occupation.

Although not under control of Iranian government, in order to stress the territorial claim of Iran, it was declared a province on 12 November 1957, with two parliamentary seats dedicated to it (in the early 1900s, one parliamentary seat was reserved for Bahrain). A year later in 1958 Sheikh Salman bin Hamad Al Khalifa (ruler of Bahrain) pledged allegiance to Iran. One of his predecessors, Sheikh Muhammad bin Khalifah Al Khalifa had in 1851 asked for Iranian protection against Wahabbis and declared his preparedness to be a Qajar Iran protectorate. However, the British forced him to become their protectorate.

Before the creation of the de jure province in 1957, Iran considered Bahrain as part of Fars province. During Safavid Iran, Bahrain was subordinate to Bushehr governorship and Zubarah (located in modern-day country of Qatar) was its capital city. In 1737, under Afsharid dynasty Bahrain was made subject to Fars governorship.

The province officially ceased to exist with a resolution approved by the lower house on 14 May 1971 with 184 votes to 4, and unanimously approved by the upper house on 18 May 1971; and Iran recognized Bahrain as an independent sovereign state.

== See also ==
- Bahrain–United Kingdom relations
