= Velayat =

Map of Safavid Iran and its divisions in 1660

A velayat (also spelled vilayat; Persian: ولایت) was a type of administrative division within Safavid Iran, which functioned as a semi-autonomous province.

The velayats were situated in the frontier of the country, mainly in its mountainous areas. In order of ranking, the five velayats were: Arabestan, Lorestan, Georgia, Kurdistan, and Bakhtiyari lands.

A velayat was governed by a vali ("viceroy", "governor"), who was nearly an independent governor. The valis generally belonged to prominent local families, and were officially chosen by the shah as a compromise of regional autonomy. Nevertheless, they ruled in a hereditary manner. In rare occasions a vali was appointed to a velayat he had no connection to. This could possibly cause issues, such as in the 1680s Kurdistan, where the locals chased out a non-Kurdish vali chosen by Shah Soleyman (r. 1666–1694).

A family member of the vali (often a son) was kept as a hostage in Isfahan to ensure continued loyalty. The valis officially showed their fealty to the shah and minted coins in his name. The valis enjoyed rights that an ordinary governor did not have, which included: absolute supervision over the administration of their region, having their own budgets and militia, and handling their own vassal relations. The shah seldom involved himself in these matters.

The tributes that the valis had to pay to the shah varied based on the situation. The demands were typically small, such as in the late Safavid era, where Lorestan provided twenty Arabian horses, 200 mules and a number of riches. During wartime, however, the requirement put on Lorestan increased to 12,000 cavalrymen and 12,000 foot-soldiers.

== Sources ==
- Matthee, Rudi (2011). Persia in Crisis: Safavid Decline and the Fall of Isfahan. I.B.Tauris. ISBN 978-0857731814.
- Matthee, Rudi (2015). "Relations between the Center and the Periphery in Safavid Iran: The Western Borderlands v. the Eastern Frontier Zone". The Historian. 77 (3): 431–463. doi:10.1111/hisn.12068. S2CID 143393018.
