= Safavid Georgia =

Province of Safavid Iran (1518–1736)

Safavid Georgia Velāyat-e Gorjestān
- 1510s – 1736
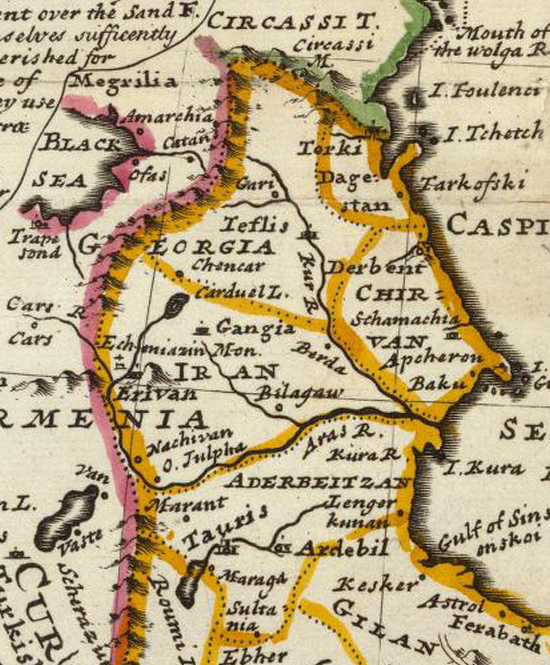
- Northwestern part of Safavid Iran
- Status: Province of Safavid Iran
- Capital: Tiflis (Tbilisi)
- Common languages: Georgian, Persian, Azerbaijani, Armenian
- Government: Velayat
Succeeded by
Afsharid Iran
- Today part of: Armenia; Azerbaijan; Georgia; Russia

The province of Georgia (Persian: ولایت گرجستان, romanized: Velāyat-e Gorjestān) was a velayat (province) of Safavid Iran located in the area of present-day Georgia. The territory of the province was principally made up of the two subordinate eastern Georgian kingdoms of Kartli (Persian: کارتیل, romanized: Kartil) and Kakheti (Persian: کاخت, romanized: Kakhet) and, briefly, parts of the Samtskhe-Saatabago. (Note: Eastern Samtskhe was part of Safavid Iran from 1551 to 1582, as well as for several years after 1613.) The city of Tiflis (present-day Tbilisi) was its administrative center, the base of Safavid power in the province, and the seat of the rulers of Kartli. It also housed an important Safavid mint.

Safavid rule was mainly exercised through the approval or appointment of Georgian royals of the Bagrationi dynasty, at times converts to Shia Islam, as walis or khans. (Note: Before Abbas I's reign (1588–1629), governors of Georgia were usually referred to as hakem. Sometimes they were also styled as soltan (salatin).) The eastern Georgian kingdoms had been subjected in the early 16th century, their rulers did not commonly convert. Tiflis was garrisoned by an Iranian force as early as Ismail I's reign, but relations between the Georgians and Safavids at the time mostly bore features of traditional vassalage. David XI (Daud Khan) was the first Safavid-appointed ruler, whose placement on the throne of Kartli in 1562 marked the start of nearly two and a half centuries of Iranian political control of eastern Georgia. During the same period, Iranian cultural influence dominated eastern Georgia.

From Tahmasp I's reign onwards (r. 1524–1576), the province was of great strategic importance. Many Georgians, generally from Kartli and Kakheti, rose to prominence in the Safavid state. These men held many of the highest positions in the civil and military administration, and many women entered the harem of the ruling class. By the late Safavid period, Georgians formed the mainstay of the Safavid army as well. The establishment of a large Georgian community in Iran proper dates back to the era of Safavid suzerainty in Georgia. As the province was a border entity, the valis of Georgia exercised more autonomy than other provinces of Safavid Iran; it could therefore be compared to the Arabestan Province (present-day Khuzestan Province), in the southwestern part of the empire. The province of Georgia was one of only four Safavid administrative territories where governors were consistently given the title of vali, with the others being Lorestan, Kurdistan, and Arabestan.

== History ==
=== 16th century ===
The first Safavid Shah Ismail I (r. 1501–1524) made the two kingdoms of Kartli and Kakheti his vassals as early as the 1510s. However, distracted by the task of establishing power in Iran, he did not tighten his hold on Georgia. He did raid Georgia a number of times, notably in 1518, which reconfirmed its status as a vassal, and in 1522, which resulted in Tbilisi being garrisoned by a large Safavid force, but it was only under his son and successor Tahmasp I (r. 1524–1576) that a genuine province with Safavid-appointed rulers and governors began to take shape.

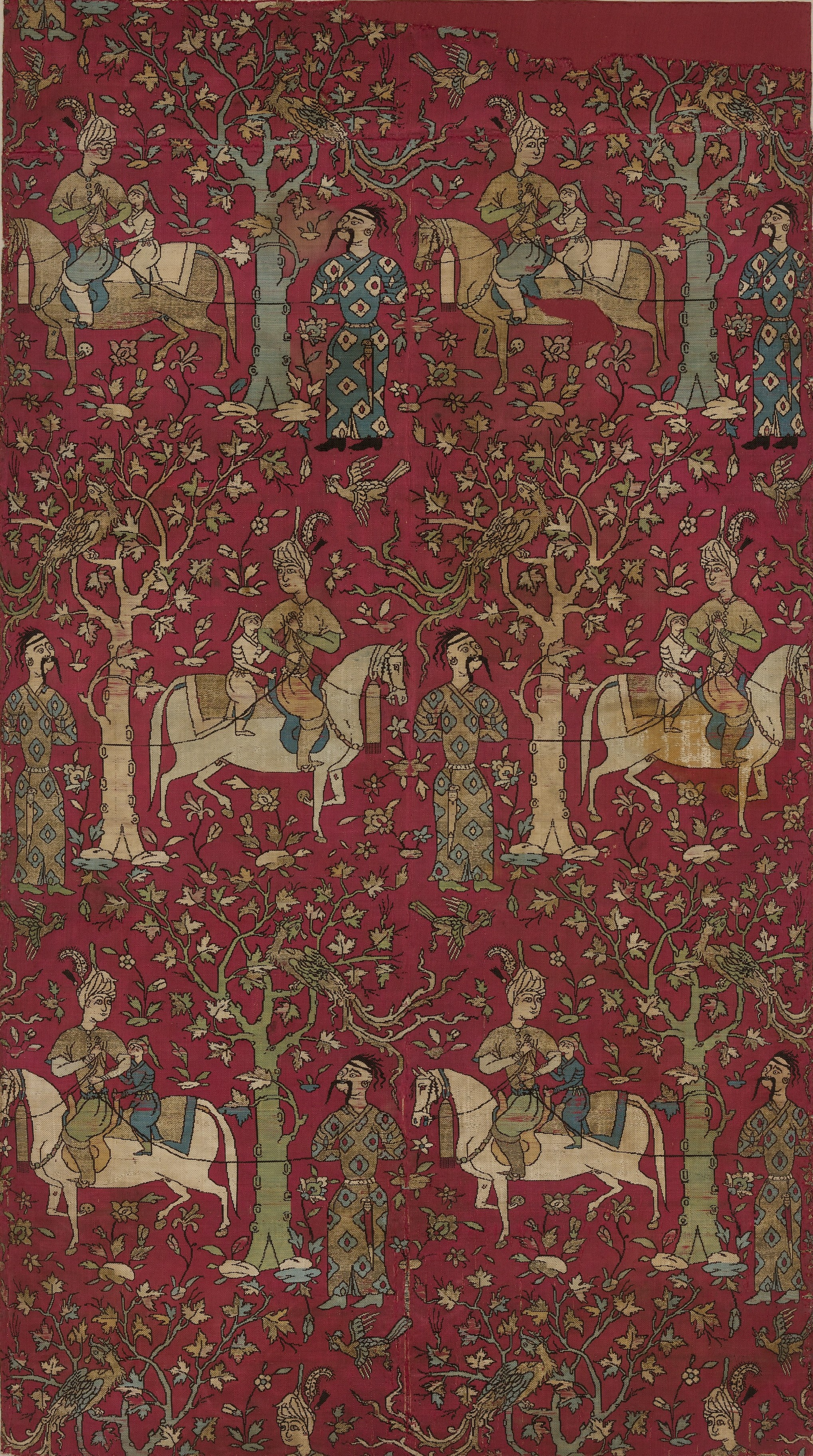
Safavid courtiers leading Georgian captives. A mid-16th century Persian textile panel from the Metropolitan Museum of Art.

Tahmasp I undertook active steps to integrate Georgia into the Safavid domains. His four campaigns against Luarsab I of Kartli (1540–1541, 1546–1547, 1551, and 1553–1554) resulted in the re-occupation of Kartli, and a Safavid force was permanently stationed in Tbilisi in 1551. A key outcome of these campaigns, apart from cementing Safavid hold in central-eastern Georgia, was that they brought to Iran proper (hereafter, simply "Iran") large numbers of Georgian prisoners of war. Beyond this, the sons of notable Georgians were frequently brought up at the shah's court as part of their tributary relationship with the Safavids. Beginning with the rule of Tahmasp I, Georgians would contribute greatly to the character of Safavid society and play a major role in its army and civil administration. This newly introduced ethnic element in the Safavid state would later be known in historiography as the "third force" alongside the two "founding elements" of the Safavid state, the Persians and the Turkomans. (Note: The "third force" included the Circassians and Armenians.)

In 1551 the Safavids gained the eastern part of the Samtskhe-Saatabago. In 1555, during Tahmasp I's reign, the Peace of Amasya was signed with the neighboring Ottoman Empire. According to the terms of the treaty, eastern Georgia (including eastern Samtskhe) remained in Iranian hands while western Georgia (including western Samtskhe) ended up in Turkish hands. To speed up the process of integration into the empire, Tahmasp I imposed numerous Iranian political and social institutions such as bilingual Georgian–Persian farmâns, with the aim of establishing Persian as the official administrative language of Safavid Georgia. It was also during his reign that the first Georgian royal, a convert to Islam named Daud Khan (r. 1569–1578) was put on the puppet throne in Tbilisi. These events marked the start of almost 250 years of Iranian political dominance, with a few brief intermissions, over eastern Georgia.

In 1559, the first provincial vizier was assigned to the Azerbaijan province, with authority over the Georgia province as well as Shirvan including Shaki. These provincial viziers, also known as royal viziers, held the title of vazir-e koll, and received instructions from the central government located in the royal capital, instead of the local governor.

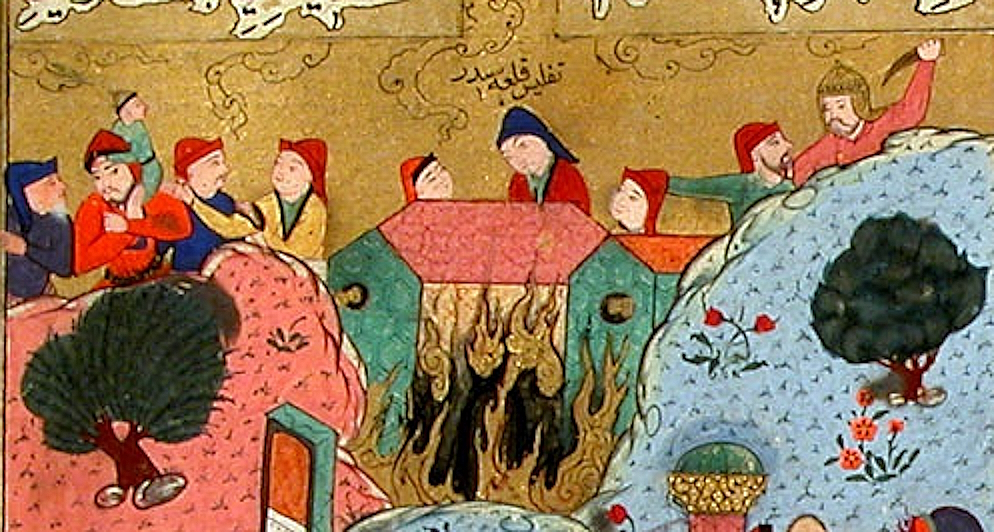
Capture of Tbilisi by the Ottomans in 21-24 August 1578, under Osman Pasha and Mustafa Pasha, following the departure of David XI ("Daud Khan") from the city, during the Ottoman–Safavid War (1578–1590). Secaatname (1586)

Challenging the Safavid possession of eastern Caucasus, the Ottomans invaded the Georgian polities in a victorious campaign in 1578. As a result, the Safavids released the Georgian rebel ruler Shahnavaz Khan (Simon I of Kartli) from captivity to enable him to join the fight against the Ottomans. (Note: Simon I was earlier known for his fierce resistance against the Safavid domination, which resulted in his being imprisoned for several years at the Alamut Castle.) Though Simon achieved considerable success in Kartli, he was eventually captured by the Ottoman troops and died in captivity in Constantinople. In the period 1580–1581 the Safavid government sent a force accompanied by the tupchi-bashi Morad Khan to Georgia together with a number of cannon founders and the materials needed for casting cannon. By 1582 the Ottomans were in control of the eastern, Safavid portion of Samtskhe. Unable to resist the Ottoman invasion, Manuchar II Jaqeli of Samtskhe accepted the Iranian overlordship as well and moved to the Safavid court, where he lived until his death in 1614. By the Treaty of Constantinople in 1590, the Safavids lost control over Georgia as they were forced to recognize the whole province as an Ottoman possession.

=== 17th century ===
Rostam Khan (Rostom), vali of Kartli, eastern Georgia, 1633–1658

At the beginning of the rule of Abbas I, the importance of Georgia and the influence of ethnic Georgians in the Safavid state increased and they came to be known as the "third force". Already by 1595 an ethnic Georgian from Kartli, Allahverdi Khan, originally surnamed Undiladze, had become one of the most powerful figures in the Safavid state. By the end of the 16th century, Georgians, forming an increasingly influential military faction, became a major threat to the Qizilbash, the traditional backbone of the Safavid army. At the same time, the Georgians at the Safavid court vied for influence among each other as well as against their Circassian counterparts. By and large, Abbas I's policy towards the province can be seen as a continuing the previous efforts to fully integrate the area in the Safavid Empire.

In the early years of the 17th century, Abbas re-established Safavid influence in eastern Georgia. There was a resistance in Kakheti in 1605, when the rebels overthrew pro-Iranian patricide Constantine Khan and Abbas I acceded to their demands to approve Teimuraz I as the new king of Kakheti. At the same time, he also confirmed Luarsab II as wali of Kartli. However, when Luarsab started to work against Safavid interests and refused to convert to Islam, Abbas I had him incarcerated in Astarabad and later executed in Shiraz.

In 1607 Abbas appointed Manuchar III Jaqeli as ruler of (eastern) Samtskhe. By 1613–1614 Abbas had restored Safavid control over eastern Samtskhe. In 1614–1617, as a punishment for disobedience shown by his formerly loyal subjects Luarsab and Teimuraz, Abbas I launched several major punitive campaigns in his Georgian territories. These campaigns resulted in the sack of Tbilisi, the ravaging of the entire area, the massacre of many tens of thousands, and the deportation of hundreds of thousands of ethnic Georgians to Iran. These deportees further augmented the Georgian community in Iran. In the meantime, Abbas I appointed Bagrat Khan as governor of Kartli. In 1619 Abbas I appointed Bagrat's son Semayun Khan (Simon II of Kartli, also known as Simon Khan) a loyalist born and raised in Isfahan, as khan, or wali, of Kartli, and appointed another non-royal Safavid official as governor of Kakheti, in order to maintain a tight grip on this part of the province. He also moved many Qizilbash tribal folk to the Georgia province in order to strengthen central control. From the mid-1610s onwards, Kakheti was often under the direct governorship of Qizilbash lords.

Around 1620 Abbas relocated some 8,000 Jews from the province, along with 40,000 Armenians, to the newly built city of Farahabad. In these years, he moved a total of about 15,000 families from the Caucasus to Mazandaran. (Note: Amongst the deportees there were also Muslims from Georgia, and sections of the Shirvan and Karabakh population.) In 1624–25 Manuchar III Jaqeli, appointed earlier by Abbas I as nominal ruler of Samtskhe, moved to Kartli to join the rebellion of Murav-Beg (Giorgi Saakadze) against Safavid rule. Some time later, while away from Samtskhe, he decided to accept Ottoman suzerainty. However, when he returned to Samtskhe in 1625 for negotiations in the western (Ottoman) part of Samtskhe, he was killed by his own uncle. Subsequently, the Ottomans incorporated the western part of Samtskhe as a pashalik. The Safavids retained control of the eastern part. The remaining century of Safavid rule in Georgia, after Abbas I's death in 1629, was marked by unprecedented Iranian influence. Under the wali Khosrow Mirza, Safavid Georgia saw a period of relative peace and prosperity. In return for his loyalty, the then-incumbent king, Safi (r. 1629–1642), had given him the title of Rostam Khan, and had made him governor of Kartli, a post which he held for more than twenty years. Kakheti however, came under direct Safavid rule.

Rostam Khan was a childless widower, however, and thus needed a wife and offspring. Being the loyal servant he was, after consulting the Safavid king, Rostam was allowed to marry a sister of Levan II Dadiani, ruler of Mingrelia (western Georgia), named Mariam. The marriage fit well with the political ambitions of the Safavid state and of Rostam himself. Not only would this alliance with the Dadiani, i.e. Mingrelia, give Rostam an ally against Teimuraz I and George III of Imereti, but it would also provide Rostam with a line of successors who would be as loyal to the Safavid crown as he was. Also important was that it would enhance Safavid plans to conquer Imereti. It would create a perfect circumstance if a campaign was needed against the Ottomans, with whom they were at war at the time over Imereti. King Safi paid for the wedding gifts, and sent some 50,000 marchil, roughly half a ton of silver, to the ruler of Mingrelia, and provided him with an annual salary of 1,000 tomans (3-gram gold coins); an alliance was thus founded with the Mingrelians. The marriage preparations alarmed the Imeretians. The groom's party was a 30,000-strong army marching to meet Levan's heavily armed entourage. George III of Imereti blocked the border with Kartli, compelling Rostom's wedding party to take a circuitous route via Akhaltsikhe, and intercepted Dadiani on his way to the marriage, but he was defeated and taken prisoner by Levan at the Kaka Bridge near Baghdati.

In 1639, by the Treaty of Zuhab which ended the 1623–1639 war, the Caucasus was decisively partitioned between the Safavids and Ottomans roughly along the lines of the earlier Amasya treaty of 1555. Kartli and Kakheti were reconfirmed as Iranian domains, while everything to the west of it remained in Ottoman hands. Samtskhe–Meskheti, including its eastern part, was irrevocably lost.

In 1654, during the reign of King Abbas II (r. 1642–1666), Kartli was turned into crown land (khasseh), and therefore subjected to direct Safavid taxation. The amount of land directly taxed by the state reached its greatest extent in this year. Also during Abbas II's reign, an earlier plan was revived to populate the eastern part of the province, Kakheti, with Turkic nomads. This measure incited a general uprising in 1659. The rebels succeeded in expelling the nomads, but still had to accept the Safavid kings's suzerainty. In 1675 a wall was built around Tiflis by king Suleiman I (1666–1694). By the 1690s ethnic Georgians formed the mainstay of the Safavid army.

=== 18th century ===
In 1701 one of the artillerymen (tupchis) in Tiflis was appointed vakil ("regent") of the tupchi-bashi of Tiflis fortress. Imam Quli Khan (David II), born and raised in Isfahan, and known for his loyal service to his Safavid overlords, was made governor of Kakheti in 1703–1709 by Sultan Husayn (r. 1694–1722) due to his father, Nazar-Ali Khan (Heraclius I), being stationed at Isfahan during the entire period.

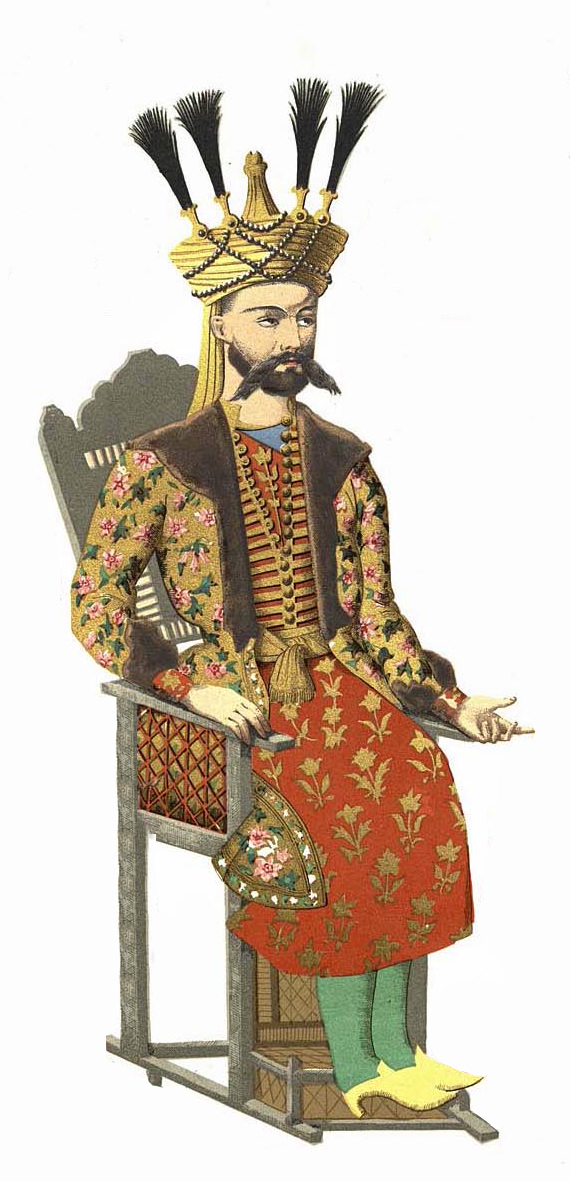
Emamqoli Khan (David II of Kakheti)

In 1709, following his father's death, he was formally appointed as the new governor of Kakheti. However, until 1715, he served as wali in absentia due to his being obliged to stay at the court in Isfahan. To the west, in Kartli, the administration was given to two successive governors who both served as vali in absentia due to being stationed in other parts of the empire: Shah-Navaz Khan II, Gorgin Khan (George XI); and Kaykhosrow Khan. Due to this, in the years 1703–1714, the administration there was led by two successive regents (janeshins) namely Shah-Qoli Khan (Levan) and Hosayn-Qoli Khan (Vakhtang VI).

In 1712–1719 Hosayn-Qoli Khan was forced to stay in Iran, and the Safavid king therefore gave the governorships of Kartli to others, amongst them Ali-Qoli Khan (Jesse) and janeshins such as Shah-Navaz, Bakar Mirza. In 1719 the Iranian government decided to send Hosayn-Qoli Khan, who had occupied several other high positions since 1716, back to Georgia with the task of handling the Lezgin rebellion. Assisted by the ruler of neighboring Kakheti, as well as the governor (beglarbeg) of Shirvan, Hosayn-Qoli made significant progress in putting a halt to the Lezgins. However, in the winter of 1721, at a crucial moment in the campaign, he was recalled. The order, which came after the fall of grand vizier Fath-Ali Khan Daghestani, was made at the instigation of the eunuch faction within the royal court, who had persuaded the shah that a successful end to the campaign would do the Safavid realm more harm than good. In their view, it would enable Vakhtang, the Safavid vali, to form an alliance with Russia with an eye to conquering Iran. Shortly after, the Lezgins overran Shirvan, whereafter they sacked and looted the provincial capital of Shamakhi and massacred much of its population. In 1722 Emamqoli Khan died and was buried in Qom. Sultan Husayn then appointed his brother Mahmad Qoli Khan (Constantine II) as the new governor of Kakheti.

When the capital of Isfahan was put under siege in 1722, Hosayn-Qoli Khan defied the royal orders and refused to send the requested relief force. In the meantime, Russia took full advantage of the situation. With the Safavids on the brink of collapse, they launched a campaign in 1722–1723 that resulted in the annexation of the coastal territories. The Ottomans, also taking advantage of the situation, overran the province of Georgia and other territories to the west of the area that the Russians had captured. By the Treaty of Constantinople, the two powers further divided the annexed territories between them, with the Ottomans again retaining Georgia. The rebellious Hosayn-Qoli Khan, who had sided with the Russians during their invasion in 1722–1723, in what turned out to be an ill-fated alliance, died in exile in Russia in 1737. When the Safavids were restored by Nader Qoli Beg (later known as Nader Shah), the de facto ruler of Iran, he restored Iranian dominance in the Caucasus and made Teimuraz II vali of Kakheti, while appointing an Iranian as the governor of Kartli. In 1736 Nader deposed the Safavids and became king himself, establishing the Afsharid dynasty.

== Mint ==
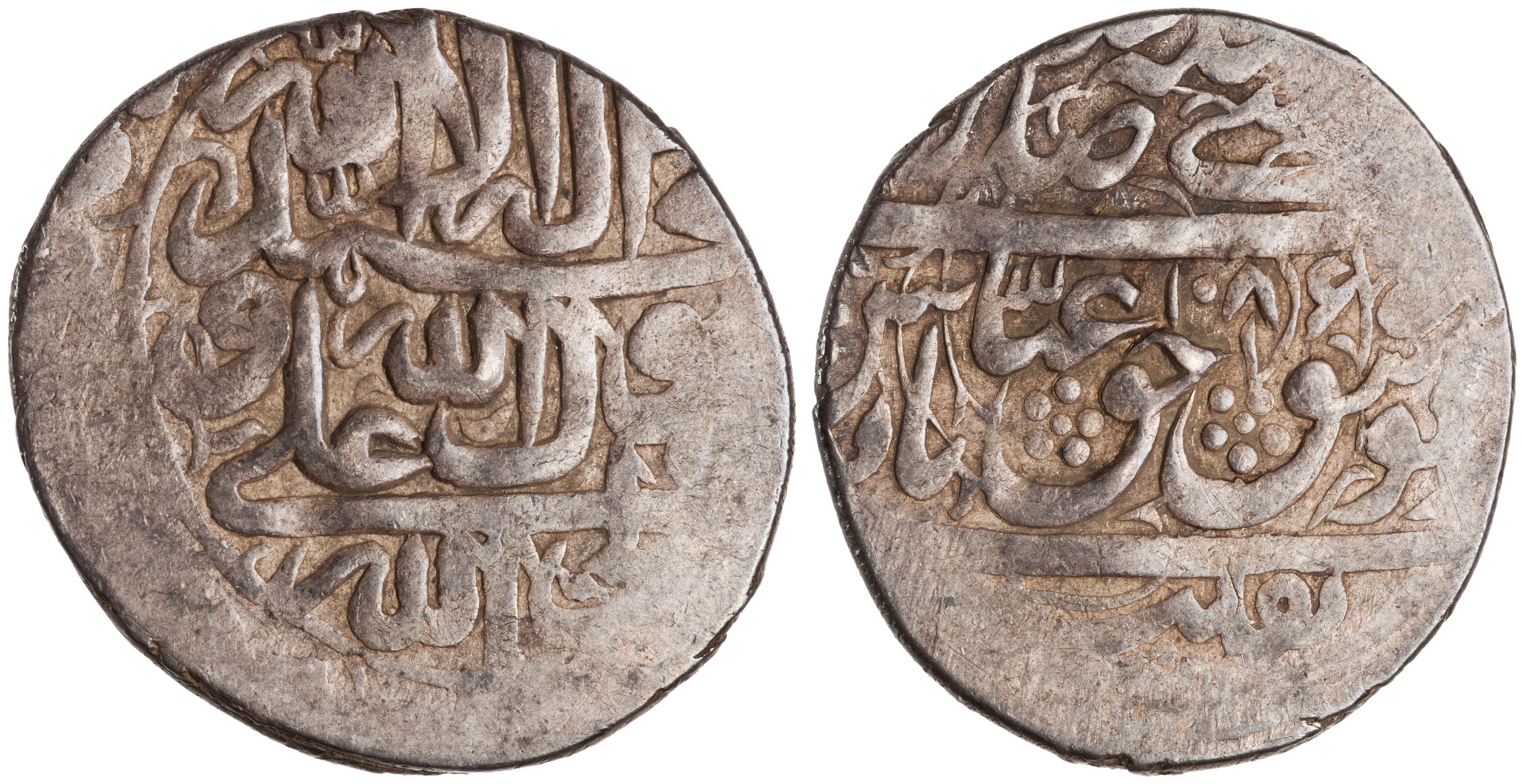
Silver coin of Abbas II (r. 1642–1666) minted in Tiflis, dated 1665/6

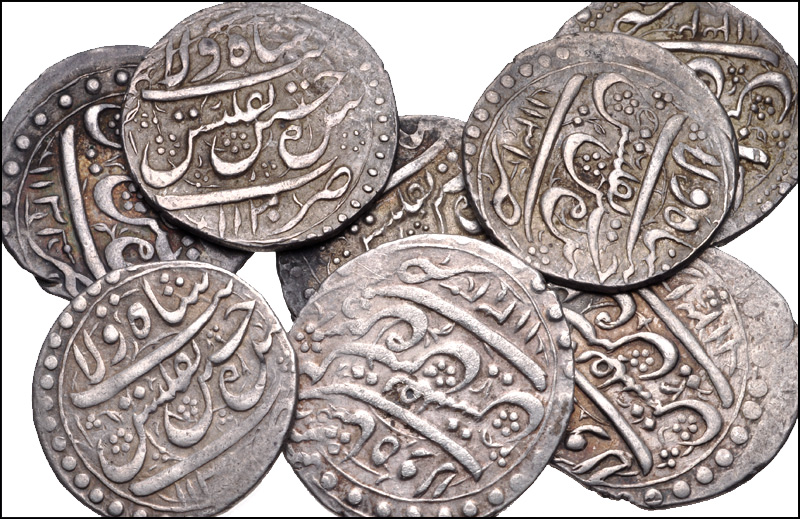
Silver abbasis minted in Tiflis during the reign of Sultan Husayn (r. 1694–1722), with minting dates varying from 1717–1718 to 1719–1720.

One of the most important Safavid mints was located in the province of Georgia, in Tiflis. Close to the border with the Ottoman Empire, the Tiflis mint was important to the Safavids, for bullion (i.e. silver bars, Spanish reals, Dutch rijksdaalders) for the minting of coins was largely imported from and through the Ottoman Empire (and Russia). Upon arrival in Iran, the bullion was usually brought to the provincial mints in the border area with the Ottoman Empire such as Tiflis, Erivan (Yerevan), or Tabriz in order to be melted into Iranian coins. Tiflis was thus a major stopping point for merchants who returned with silver. In the 17th century the Tiflis mint was one of the most active Safavid mints.

The Tiflis mint also lay on a route widely used by silk traders. According to French traveller Jean Baptiste Tavernier, traders who went to Gilan to negotiate over silk, went to the mint at Tiflis, for the mint master (zarrab-bashi) gave a 2% discount on silver for silk traders. Tavernier notes that this is partly due to the silver coins from Tiflis being a little less fine.

The coins minted at Tiflis were mostly used for the local citizens, rather than for the local Safavid garrison. The coins always had to bear the Safavid rulers' name and follow the Safavid types, legends, and weight standards. In many other regards, however, the appointed valis were granted a great deal of autonomy in terms of minting practises. For example, the vali reportedly was allowed to benefit from the profit accrued by the mints in the province.

In the 1660s and 1670s, the office of mint master (zarrab-bashi) of Tiflis was held by a series of local Armenians.

During the reign of Suleiman I, the economic situation worsened. The amount of precious metal coming into the country decreased, and as a result the quality of the coins diminished. This deficiency in weight was also apparent in coins from the Tiflis mint; in 1688, the abbasis and mahmudis struck at the mint were 22.5% below the standard weight they were supposed to have. The royal treasury was aware of the issue, and subsequently stopped accepting mahmudis that had been minted in Tiflis.

In the years 1682–1685 the only Safavid mints that were recorded as active were the ones at Tiflis and Tabriz. According to a 1687 report, money played close to no role in Georgia. French botanist Joseph Pitton de Tournefort confirms this: according to his texts of 1701, people in large parts of Georgia preferred to be paid in materials such as bracelets, rings, necklaces, and so forth.

== Stationed military force ==
The province of Georgia hosted many Safavid soldiers, as it was considered a territory of the utmost importance. At the same time, it was a province that bordered the Ottoman Empire. A Safavid force was permanently stationed in Tiflis from 1551 onwards. According to Venetian reports, some 4,000 Safavid cavalry were stationed in Georgia and Ganja in the 1570s. According to traveller Jean Chardin, towards the end of Abbas I's reign many troops were stationed in Georgia, of which some 5,000 were "battle-experienced and trained". In the mid-17th century, during the reign of Abbas II (1642–1666), some 50,000 Safavid troops were stationed in the province according to Chardin's figures. The French missionary and traveller Père Sanson, who was in Safavid Iran during the latter part of King Suleiman I's reign (1666–1694), wrote that a "large number" of troops were stationed in Georgia. Towards the end of Sultan Husayn's reign (1694–1722), the troops at the behest of the then-governor of Kartli, Hosayn-Qoli Khan (Vakhtang VI), numbered some 10,000 Georgians and 3,000–4,000 Iranians.

== Public offices ==
According to the Georgian geographer and historian Vakhushti Bagrationi, vali/king Rostom orchestrated changes in the nomenclature of various public offices, substituting Georgian titles with Persian equivalents. Examples include the transformation of msakhurt’ukhuts’esi (master of servants) to qurchi-bashi, ezosmodzghvari (housekeeper) to nazer (steward), and monat’ukhuts’esi (master of slaves) to qollar-aghasi (commander of the royal guard), among others. Despite these alterations in office names, the fundamental structure of the state machinery in Georgia remained largely intact. Furthermore, during Rostom's rule, positions characteristic of the Safavid state, such as vazir (adviser, minister), mostowfi (chief financial clerk), and monshi (scribe), were introduced, serving as supervisory roles for the royal court.

Historical records from the 1570s also document the roles of malek and darugha, officials in the town administration of Georgia, which are associated with the political influence of Iran during that period.

The vali of Georgia had a corps of qurchis at his disposal, including a qurchi-bashi, and a legion of specialized qurchis for his "accoutrements" (i.e. qurchi-e zereh, qurchi-e kafsh, qurchi-e tarkesh, etc.). They also had the institution of vakil ("regent"), who could take care of all matters in case it was needed. (Note: The vakil sometimes also functioned as a tutor (laleh), in cases when the governor was young.)

== Silk and wine production ==
Although the province contributed to the overall silk production, its silk was said, together with that of Karabakh–Ganja, to be of lesser quality than that of Gilan and Mazandaran. Following Abbas I's (1588–1629) decisive subduing of Georgia, he ordered that the province should produce more silk in the future. According to Nicolaas Jacobus Overschie, a Dutch representative in Iran, of the 2,800 bales of silk that had been produced in 1636, the provinces of Georgia and Karabakh–Ganja had yielded a total of 300 bales.

According to Jean Chardin, the wines produced in Georgia and Shiraz were of excellent quality. Every six months the province of Georgia supplied the royal wine cellars of the Safavid court with some three hundred liters of wine, as part of the total amount of taxes it paid. The governors were responsible for the supervision of the viticulture of their province.

== Salary and rank of the vali of Kartli ==
As outlined in the Dastur al-Moluk, the Kartli vali's annual salary was linked to the profits generated from the Poshkuh, Tarom, and Qazvin regions. This data, as reported by Georgian sources, also indicates that the Kartli vali received compensation from the revenues of Gilan, Khuyin, and Lahijan. Following Iranian customs, the vali was granted villages in exchange for his service to the Iranian Shah. It is worth noting that these villages were not confined to Kartli but also extended to northern Iran, mirroring the similar rewards bestowed upon Georgian nobles.

According to the Tadhkirat al-Moluk, the vali of Kartli was the third of the top-ranking officials not residing at court, and held a higher status than the second category of great amirs, those attached to the palace.

== Cultural influences ==
=== Georgian culture ===
From the 16th century there was an increase of Iranian influence in Georgian culture. The genres in which it was most apparent were literature, painting, and architecture. During the Safavid period, many Georgian rulers, princes, and nobles had spent time in Iran. Therefore, Iranian traditions also spread throughout Georgia. The placement of Davud Khan (David XI) on the puppet throne of Kartli in 1562 did not just initiate a lengthy period of Iranian political dominance; in the same two and a half centuries that followed, until the coming of the Russians in the 19th century, Iranian cultural influence dominated eastern Georgia (Kartli–Kakheti). According to Jean Chardin, who was in Georgia in 1672, the Georgians followed Iranian traditions. Chardin assumed that the process had been influenced by those nobles who had converted to Islam (in order to obtain positions as state officials), as well as those who encouraged their female relatives to become ladies at court.

In the Safavid period, "a great number of books" were translated from Persian into Georgian. The Rostomiani, the Georgian version of the Shahnameh, was further developed and improved, as well as Visramiani, the Georgian version of Vis o Ramin. According to a letter sent to the Pope by a Catholic missionary who flourished in the 17th century, Padre Bernardi, it was to his "great regret" that literate Georgians preferred to read works such as the Rostomiani (Shahnameh), Bezhaniani, and Baramguriani and were less interested in religious texts.

Teimuraz I of Kakheti (Tahmuras Khan) is perhaps mostly remembered for creating issues for the central government, but he was fluent in Persian and fond of Persian poetry, which he "highly valued". In his words:

The sweetness of Persian speech urged me to compose the music of verse.

Teimuraz wrote several poems influenced by the contemporary Persian tradition, packed with "Persian imagery and allusions, loanwords, and phraseology". A later Georgian vali, Vakhtang VI (Hosayn-Qoli Khan), was also important in this regard. When he was forced to stay in Iran, he learned to excel in Persian. He later used this skill to translate works into Georgian. He created a Georgian version of the Persian Qabusnameh known as Amirnasariani ("The story of Amirnasar", Amirnasar being the mythical Iranian king Kaykavus). During his detention in Iran, Vakhtang also translated into Georgian Kashefi's Kalīleh o Demneh. Later, back in Georgia, he ordered the entire story to be translated once more, while his tutor, Sulkhan-Saba Orbeliani, also made a revised version of Vakhtang's own translation. Though Vakhtang, individually, was heavily involved in further developing Georgian-Iranian literary ties (in other words, by his own writings), he also founded an entire school dedicated to translators from Persian into Georgian. During this period, a number of folk stories (i.e. dastans) that were extremely popular in Iran, were translated into Georgian on his orders. One of these was the Bakhtiarnameh, a collection of several novellas, as well as the Baramgulandamiani ("Bahram o Golandam"), originally written by Katebi Nishapuri. The many other Persian-Georgian literary efforts of this era include translations of the Qur'an and books on Shia jurisprudence.

=== Iranian culture ===
In another, perhaps unorthodox, way Georgia also influenced the culture of Iran. According to a story, an ethnic Georgian named Shedan Chiladze was so renowned for being able to "hold" his liquor, that Safavid King Safi (r. 1629–1642) invited him to the court in order to hold a drinking competition. After beating everyone at court, the king himself challenged Chiladze, and reportedly died doing so. Though historian Rudi Matthee reports that the story may be "apocryphal", as alcoholism did kill Safi, but not in relation to a drinking contest, it does show that Georgian habits had spread to Iran.

In the Safavid period, large numbers of ethnic Georgian men entered Safavid government service, whereas many Georgian women entered the harems of the ruling elite and the royal court. Drinking alcohol, a prominent Georgian habits, influenced Iranian society, and more importantly, court culture, during this period. It is especially evident in the taxes the province had to pay – they included many liters of wine. The royal harem, the private area of the royal court, was where Safavid rulers grew up; after Abbas I's reign, all Safavid rulers grew up there surrounded by mostly Georgian women. There were also many gholams who drank. Matthee therefore suggests that it is quite likely that the "fondness" for wine exhibited by Safavid rulers originated in this environment.

== See also ==
- List of rulers of Safavid Georgia

== Sources ==
- Babaie, Sussan; Babayan, Kathryn; Baghdiantz-McCabe, Ina; Farhad, Massumeh (2004). Slaves of the Shah: New Elites of Safavid Iran. I.B.Tauris. pp. 1–256. ISBN 978-0857716866.
- Barendse, R.J. (2002). The Arabian Seas: The Indian Ocean World of the Seventeenth Century. Armonk, N.Y.: M.E. Sharpe. ISBN 978-0765633644.
- Blow, David (2009). Shah Abbas: The Ruthless King Who became an Iranian Legend. London, UK: I.B.Tauris. ISBN 978-1845119898. LCCN 2009464064.
- Floor, Willem (2001). Safavid Government Institutions. Costa Mesa, California: Mazda Publishers. ISBN 978-1568591353.
- Floor, Willem (2008). Titles and Emoluments in Safavid Iran: A Third Manual of Safavid Administration, by Mirza Naqi Nasiri. Washington, D.C.: Mage Publishers. pp. 1–324. ISBN 978-1933823232.
- Gelashvili, Nana (2012). "Iranian-Georgian relations during the Reign of Rostom (1633–58)". In Floor, Willem; Herzig, Edmund (eds.). Iran and the World in the Safavid Age. London: I.B.Tauris. ISBN 978-1780769905.
- Giunashvili, Jemshid (2016). "Gorgijanidze, Parsadan". In Yarshater, Ehsan (ed.). Encyclopædia Iranica (Online ed.). Encyclopædia Iranica Foundation.
- Gvakharia, Aleksandre (2001). "Georgia iv. Literary contacts with Persia". In Yarshater, Ehsan (ed.). Encyclopædia Iranica. Vol. X/5: Geography IV–Germany VI. London and New York: Routledge & Kegan Paul. pp. 481–486. ISBN 978-0-933273-53-5.
- Hitchins, Keith (2001). "Georgia ii. History of Iranian-Georgian Relations". Encyclopædia Iranica, Vol. X, Fasc. 4. pp. 464–470.
- Matthee, Rudolph P. (1999). The Politics of Trade in Safavid Iran: Silk for Silver, 1600–1730. Cambridge: Cambridge University Press. p. 120. ISBN 978-0-521-64131-9.
- Matthee, Rudolph P. (2005). The Pursuit of Pleasure: Drugs and Stimulants in Iranian History, 1500-1900. Princeton, New Jersey: Princeton University Press. ISBN 978-0691118550.
- Matthee, Rudi (2012). Persia in Crisis: Safavid Decline and the Fall of Isfahan. London: I.B.Tauris. pp. 1–371. ISBN 978-1-84511-745-0.
- Matthee, Rudi; Floor, Willem; Clawson, Patrick (2013). The Monetary History of Iran: From the Safavids to the Qajars. London; New York: I.B.Tauris. pp. 1–320. ISBN 978-0857721723.
- Mikaberidze, Alexander (2015). Historical Dictionary of Georgia (2 ed.). Lanham, Maryland: Rowman & Littlefield. ISBN 9781442241466.
- Rayfield, Donald (2012). Edge of Empires: A History of Georgia. London: Reaktion Books. ISBN 978-1780230702.
- Sanikidze, George (2021). "The Evolution of the Safavid Policy towards Eastern Georgia". In Melville, Charles (ed.). Safavid Persia in the Age of Empires, the Idea of Iran Vol. 10. Bloomsbury Publishing. ISBN 978-0755633807.
- Savory, Roger (2007). Iran Under the Safavids. Cambridge: Cambridge University Press. ISBN 978-0521042512.
- Suny, Ronald Grigor (1994). The Making of the Georgian Nation. Bloomington, Indiana: Indiana University Press. ISBN 978-0253209153.
