= Tarikh-e Alam-ara-ye Abbasi =

Chronicle of the Safavid dynasty

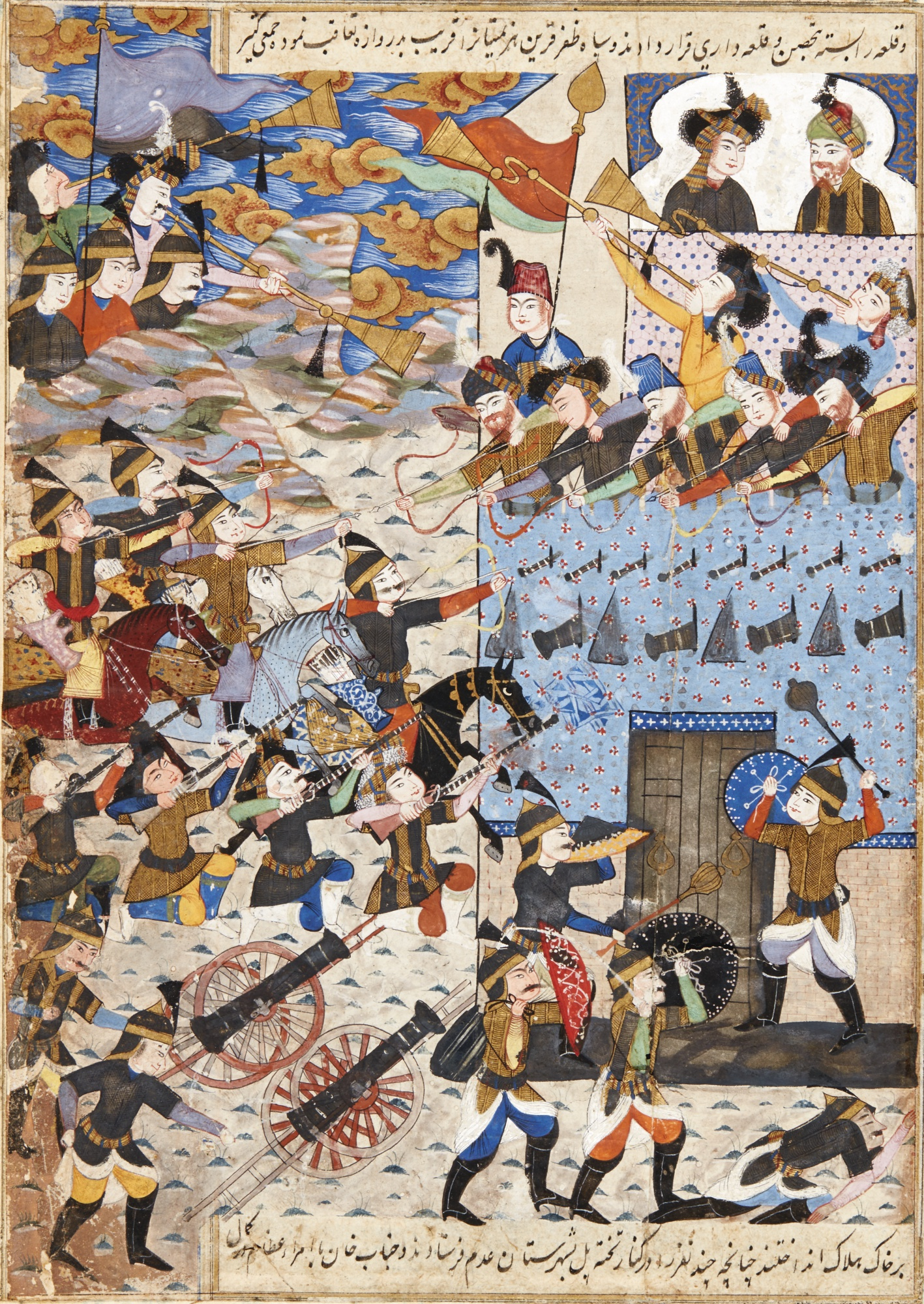
- An illustrated and illuminated leaf from the Tarikh-e Alam-ara-ye Abbasi by Iskandar Beg Munshi, depicting the capture of the citadel of Yerevan. Dated c. 1650, Isfahan (part of Sotheby's collection).
- Author: Iskandar Beg Munshi
- Language: Persian
- Genre: History
- Publication date: 1629
- Publication place: Safavid Iran

The Tarikh-e Alam-ara-ye Abbasi (Persian: تاریخ عالم‌آرای عباسی, romanized: World Adorning History of Abbas) is a Persian-language chronicle covering the history of the early Safavid dynasty of Iran, particularly Shah Abbas I (r. 1587–1629). Its author was his court historian and scribe Iskandar Beg Munshi, who completed it in 1629.

The book is considered the most significant piece of Iranian historiography written about the Safavids. It has greatly influenced Safavid studies and serves as the foundation for a number of widely held beliefs regarding Safavid history. This book has been translated into English by Roger Savory.

The most complete biography of Abbas the Great was written by the head secretary at his court (Iskandar Beg Munshi) in a Persian history book called the Tarikh-e Alam-ara-ye Abbasi (“The Adorner of the World”). This book uses relatively complex language and discusses not only about Shah Abbas’s life and rule, but about earlier Safavid shahs, what was happening in the Ottoman Empire and West Asia, as well as the state of art, science, and learning at the time. It includes short life stories of many poets, artists, writers, and scholars. This book is an important source for learning about Safavid history, and it is seen as "the last great work" in the tradition of old Persian history writing.

Translating Tarikh-e Alam-ara-ye Abbasi was quite challenging. Not only is the book extremely long (over 1116 pages of dense text in its latest edition), but its writing style is so complex that a word-for-word translation would be very difficult and boring to read.

== Iskandar Beg: a Safavid chronicle ==
Iskandar Beg Munshi was born around 1560 and likely died around 1632. He was a secretary in the Safavid government and is best known for his historical work, which is divided into three books. Book I gives a brief history of the Safavid origins and the reigns of the rulers before Shah Abbas I. This part is mainly based on earlier histories like Ahsan al-tavarikh, Habib al-siyar, Nosakh-e jahan-ara, and the now-lost Fotuhat-e shahi, but it also includes important details not found in other sources. It is noted for being clear and accurate.

Books II and III focus on Shah Abbas's reign, making up the main part of the work. Books I and II were finished in 1616, while Book III was completed in 1629, the year Shah Abbas died. As a contemporary of the events, Iskandar Beg’s account is known for its detailed and accurate storytelling. His role as a chief secretary (monšī-ye ‘azim) at the court allowed him to witness many events firsthand, offering a fresh and vivid perspective. This unique position gave him the chance to provide deep insights into the workings of the Safavid court, making his work an important resource for understanding the history of the time.

== Writing style ==
He explains important background information about events in the Ottoman and Mughal Empire, helping the reader understand how they affected Iran. Some examples of his most well-known historical writing include his description of the growing tension before the murder of Queen Khayr al-Nisa Begum in 1579, the excitement of the royal army's march to Herat in 1583, the hunt for Alī Khan in Gilan and Šāhverdī Khan in Lorestan, and the assassination of Abd al-Mo'men Khan. He gives detailed descriptions of the sieges of Erīvān in 1604 and Baghdad in 1623, as well as the major battle of Safian, which he witnessed.

== Touches of humor ==
The book is more than a historical record; it stands out for its rich writing style, humor, irony, and emotional depth. He includes witty observations, like Shah Abbas ignoring the Uzbeks’ crimes due to divine justice and limited power. The book features clever stories, such as a man pretending to study law to avoid suspicion and a royal astrologer proving his predictions. It also captures touching scenes, like rulers left in empty camps or hopes to avoid civil war. These unique qualities make his chronicle a valuable and lasting contribution to Persian historiography.

== Iskander Beg as a Historian ==
Iskandar Beg is known for being honest and brave as a historian. He shares his own opinions along with stating facts. He praises Shah Abbas when it is deserved and gives fair criticism when needed, even if it might upset the Shah. He questions official stories, fairly judges enemy leaders, and tries to avoid strong bias, even though there are common religious prejudices.

Iskandar Beg explains that if he didn't witness an event himself, he worked hard to get reliable information from soldiers, merchants, and travelers. He knows these sources might not always be completely accurate, but he checks the facts carefully with other evidence. When he isn't sure about the truth of a report, he admits it. His honesty in telling the facts without exaggerating them for personal gain or to impress others shows his strong integrity as a historian.

== Sources ==
- Moreen, Vera B. (2010). "ʽĀlamārā-yi Ἁbbāsi, Tārīkh-i". In Norman A. Stillman (ed.). Encyclopedia of Jews in the Islamic World. Brill Online.
- Quinn, Sholeh A. (2008). "ʿĀlam ārā- yi ʿAbbāsī". In Fleet, Kate; Krämer, Gudrun; Matringe, Denis; Nawas, John; Rowson, Everett (eds.). Encyclopaedia of Islam (3rd ed.). Brill Online. ISSN 1873-9830.
- Sadan, A. (2022). "The Nature of Legitimacy: Representations of the Natural World in Iskandar Beg Munshi's Tārīkh-e ʿĀlam-ārā-ye ʿAbbāsī". Iranian Studies. 54 (1–2). Cambridge University Press: 41–65. doi:10.1080/00210862.2019.1647095. S2CID 211677412.
- Savory, Roger M. (1985). "ʿĀlamārā-ye ʿAbbāsī". In Yarshater, Ehsan (ed.). Encyclopædia Iranica. Vol. I/8: Alafrank–Alp Arslan. London and New York: Routledge & Kegan Paul. p. 796. ISBN 978-0-71009-097-3.
