= Rumlu =

Turkoman tribe active in Safavid Iran

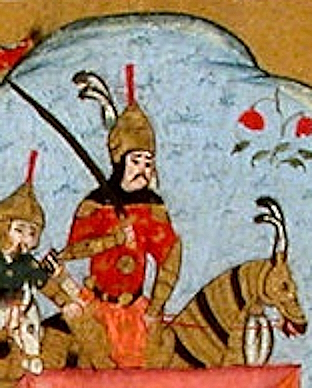
Aras Khan Rumlu on horse in the Siege of Shamakhi, 9–11 November 1578. Secaatname (1586)

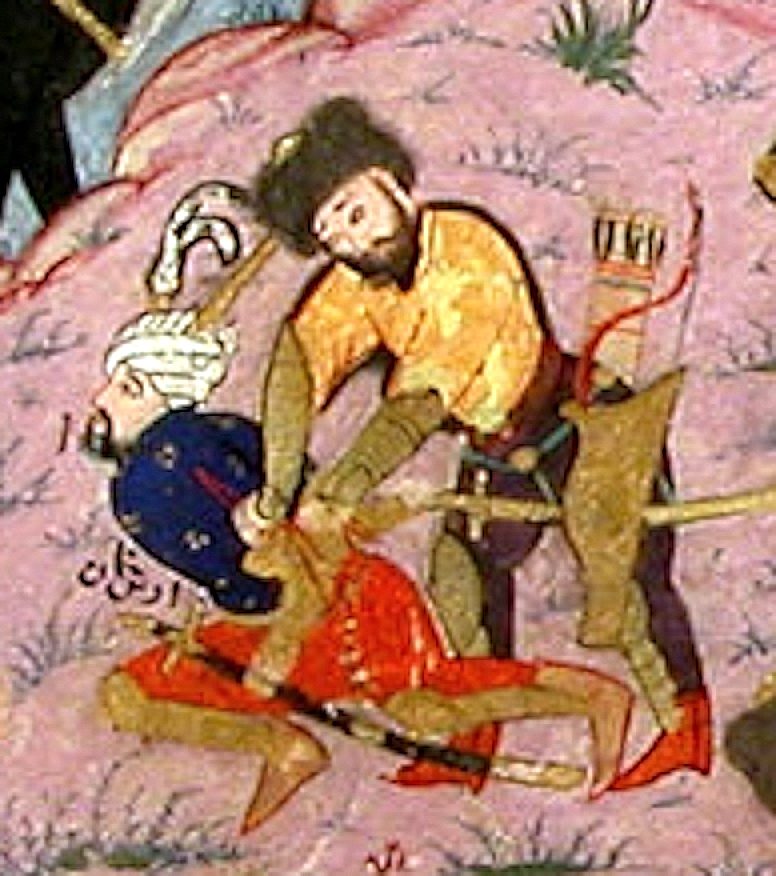
Aras Khan Rumlu captured by a Crimean Khanate warrior of Adil Giray, in November 1578. Şeca'atname (1598)

The Rumlu were one of the Azerbaijani Turkic speaking Qizilbash Turkoman tribes that were active during the Safavid period.

A famous Rumlu was Div Sultan Rumlu who was appointed by Shah Ismail as tutor (lala) of his son Tahmasp. When the ten-year-old Tahmasp ascended the throne after his father's death, Div Sultan Rumlu was the de facto ruler of the realm. Rule by a member of the Rumlu tribe was unacceptable to the other Turkoman tribes of the Qizilbash, especially the Ustajlu and Takkalu.

Kopek Sultan, governor of Tabriz and leader of the Ustajlu, along with Chuha Sultan, leader of the Takkalu tribe, were Div Sultan Rumlu's strongest opponents. The Takkalu were powerful in Isfahan and Hamadan while the Ustajlu held Khorasan and the Safavid capital, Tabriz. Rumlu proposed a triumvirate to the two leaders which was accepted, the terms were for sharing the office of amir al-umara. The triumvirate proved unsustainable, since all sides were dissatisfied with their share of power.

In the spring of 1526, a series of battles in northwest Iran between these tribes expanded into Khorasan and became a civil war. The Ustajlu faction was quickly excluded and their leader, Kopek Sultan, was killed by the order of Chuha Sultan. During the civil war, the Uzbeks raiders temporarily seized Tus and Astarabad. Div Sultan Rumlu was blamed for the raids and was executed. His execution was performed by Tahmasp himself in 1527.

Hasan Beg Rumlu (1530–c. 1578) was a 16th-century Safavid historian and military officer. A cavalryman of the qurchi corps, he is principally known for his chronicle of Safavid history; the Ahsan al-tavarikh.

Aras Khan Rumlu was a famous military commander of the Safavid army, during the Ottoman–Safavid War (1578–1590), who led Safavid forces agasint the Crimeans sent by Murad III near the southwest corner of the Caspian Sea.

== Sources ==
- Blow, David (2009). Shah Abbas: The Ruthless King Who Became an Iranian Legend. I.B. Tauris. ISBN 978-1-84511-989-8.
- Купели Озер (2014). Походы крымских татар и турок-осман против Ирана. Золотоордынское обозрение.
- Kütükoğlu Bekir (1962). Osmanli-Iran Siyâsî münâsebetleri. Edebiyat Fakültesi Matbaasi.
- Mitchell, Colin P (2009b). "Tahmāsp I". In Yarshater, Ehsan (ed.). Encyclopædia Iranica (Online ed.). Encyclopædia Iranica Foundation.
- Newman, Andrew J. (2008). Safavid Iran: Rebirth of a Persian Empire. New York: I.B.Tauris. ISBN 9780857716613.
- Peçevi, İbrahim (1988). История [History: Excerpts on the History of Azerbaijan and Adjacent Countries and Regions, 1520–1640] (in Russian). Translated by Z. M. Buniyatov. Baku: Elm.
- Roemer, H. R. (2008). "The Safavid Period". The Cambridge History of Iran, Volume 6: The Timurid and Safavid Periods. Cambridge: Cambridge University Press. pp. 189–350. ISBN 9781139054980.
- Savory, Roger M.; Bosworth, C.E. (2012). "Ṭahmāsp". In Fleet, Kate; Krämer, Gudrun; Matringe, Denis; Nawas, John; Rowson, Everett (eds.). Encyclopaedia of Islam (3rd ed.). Brill Online. ISSN 1873-9830.
