= Kayki Mustafa Bey =

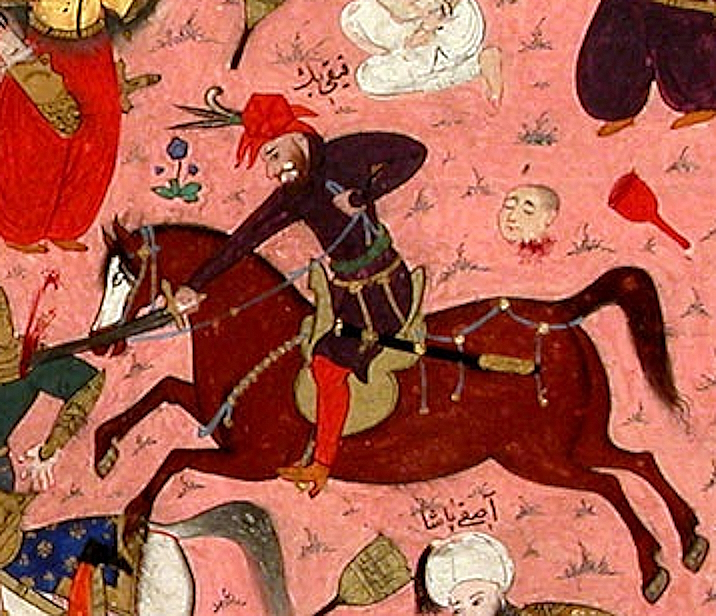
Kaykı Bey ("قيقى بك") in combat in Shirvan. Secaatname (1586).

Kayki Mustafa Bey, also Kaykı Bey (قيقى بك), was an Ottoman army officer who played a role in the Ottoman–Safavid War (1578–1590).

From 1579, Kayki Mustafa Bey together with Asafi attempted to protect the recently conquered Shirvan against the counter-attacks of the Safavids. Osman Pasha ordered them to reinforce the fortifications of Qabala castle. In 1581, the Qabala castle was captured following a Safavid ruse, in which they used fall letters and Korans to suggest the war had ended. The Ottoman garrison fell, and Asafi was captured by the Safavid Kizilbas.

Asafi was kept in captivity in Qazvin and Isfahan, but was released in 1585, finally rejoining Osman Pasha.

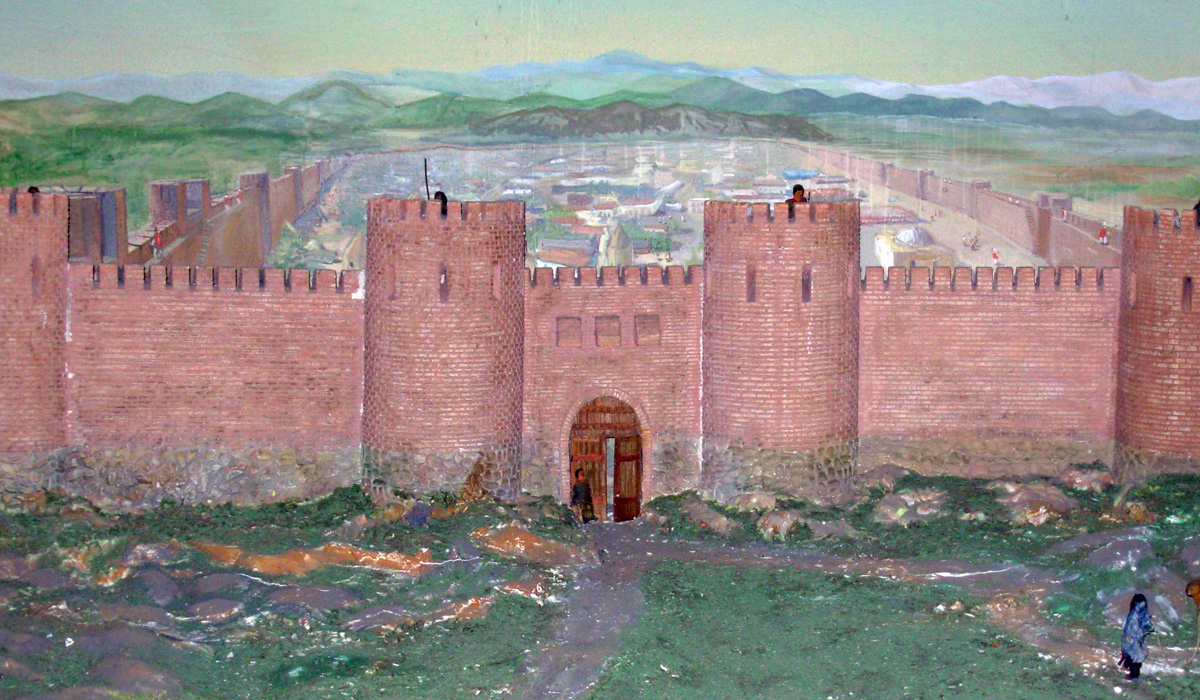
Qabala castle (reconstruction)

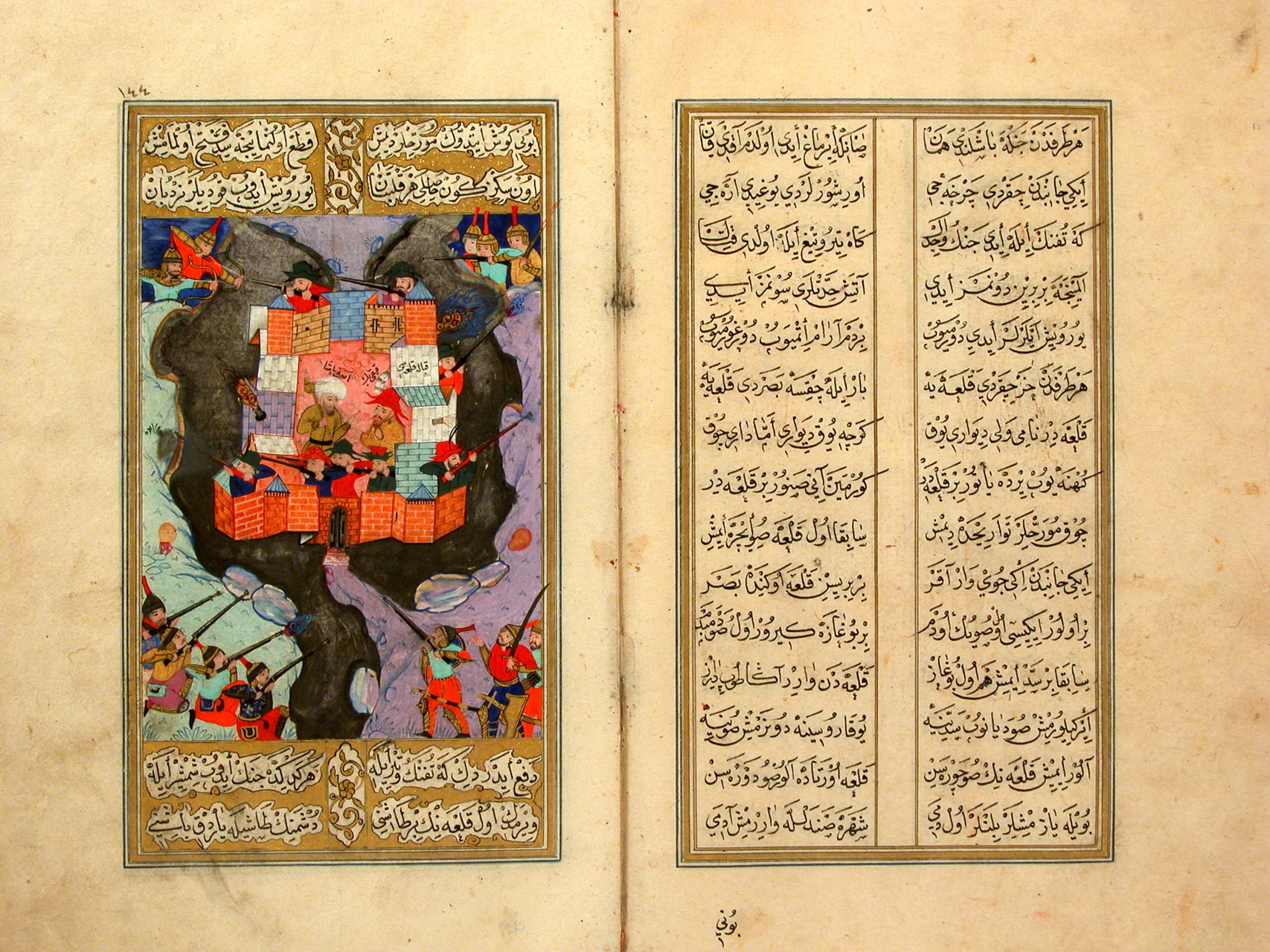
Âsafi and Kaykı Bey in the Qabala Castle besieged by the Safavids

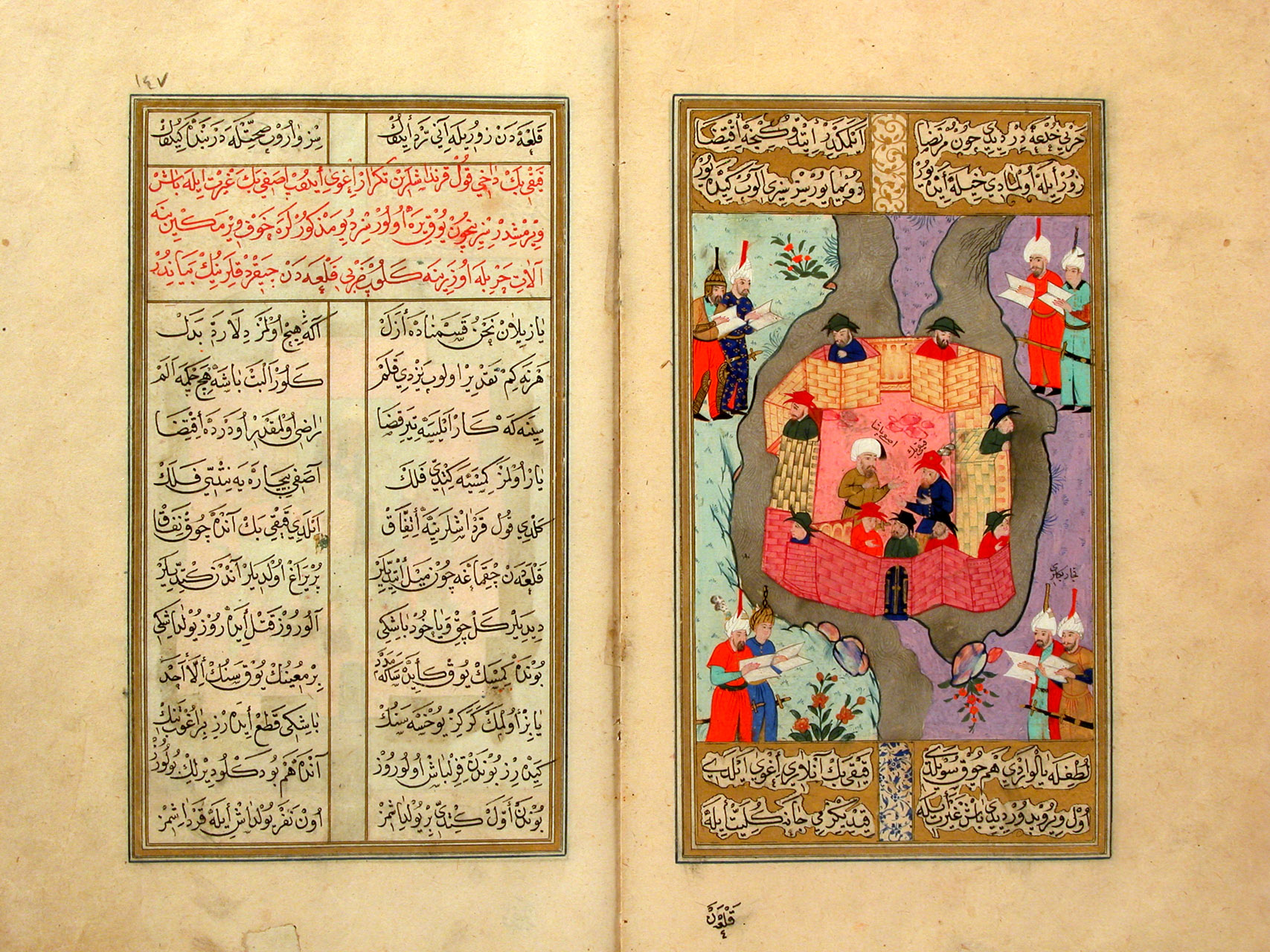
The Safavid ruse

== Sources ==
- Fleischer, Cornell H. (1986). Bureaucrat and Intellectual in the Ottoman Empire: The Historian Mustafa Ali (1541-1600). Princeton University Press. ISBN 978-0691638447.
- Taner, Melis (2020). "Illustrated Manuscripts Attributed to Baghdad". Caught in a whirlwind: a cultural history of Ottoman Baghdad as reflected in its illustrated manuscripts. Leiden; Boston: Brill. ISBN 978-9004412699.
- Tunca, Ece (2017). Depiction of the enemy through the eyes of an Ottoman bureaucrat (thesis) (PDF). Budapest: Central European University.
