= Tarikh-e negarestan =

16th-century Persian universal history

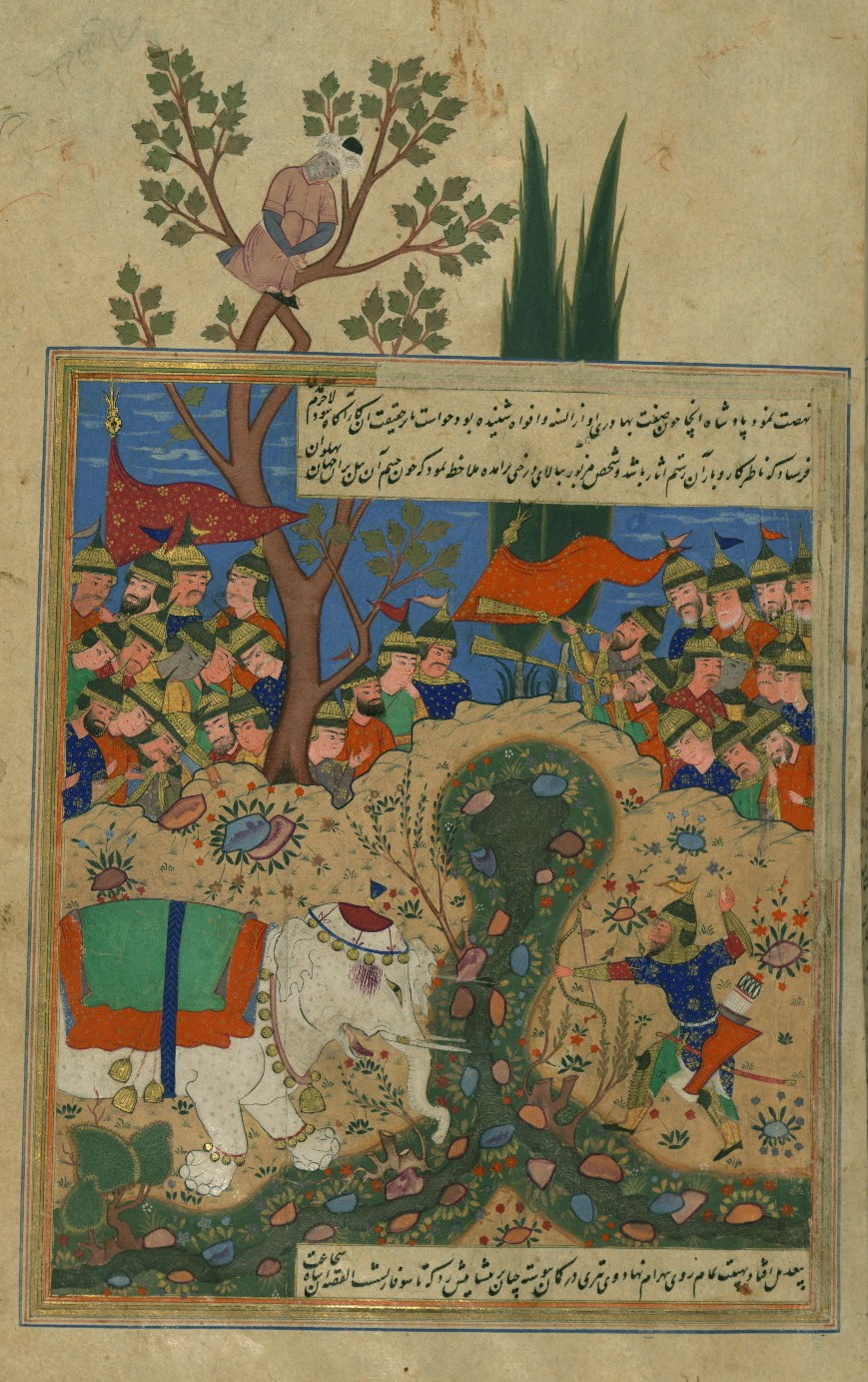
- Bahram Gur killing a white elephant, from a folio of a manuscript of the Tarikh-e negarestan, created in 1569 in Safavid Iran
- Author: Ahmad Ghaffari Qazvini
- Language: Persian
- Genre: Universal history
- Publication date: 1552
- Publication place: Safavid Iran

The Tarikh-e negarestan (Persian: تاریخ نگارستان) is a Persian universal history composed by the Safavid scribe and historian Ahmad Ghaffari Qazvini in 1552. The goal of the chronicle was to teach important historical lessons to the Safavid dynasty, including Shah Tahmasp I (r. 1524–1576).

In the Walters Art Museum, there is an illustrated version of the Tarikh-e negarestan, which was created in Iran in 1569. In the early 17th-century, the chronicle was published in Ottoman Turkish under the name Nüzhet-i cihan ve nâdire-i zaman by Altıparmak Mehmed Efendi. In Istanbul, the Süleymaniye Library and the Yenicami Library each hold a copy of it. The first lithography of the Tarikh-e negarestan was made in the city of Mumbai in 1859.

== Sources ==
- Ghereghlou, Kioumars (2020). "Ḡaffāri Qazvini, Aḥmad". Encyclopaedia Iranica Online. Brill. doi:10.1163/2330-4804_EIRO_COM_11942.
