= Siege of Shamakhi (1578) =

Part of Ottoman–Safavid War (1578–1590)

- Part of Ottoman–Safavid War (1578–1590)
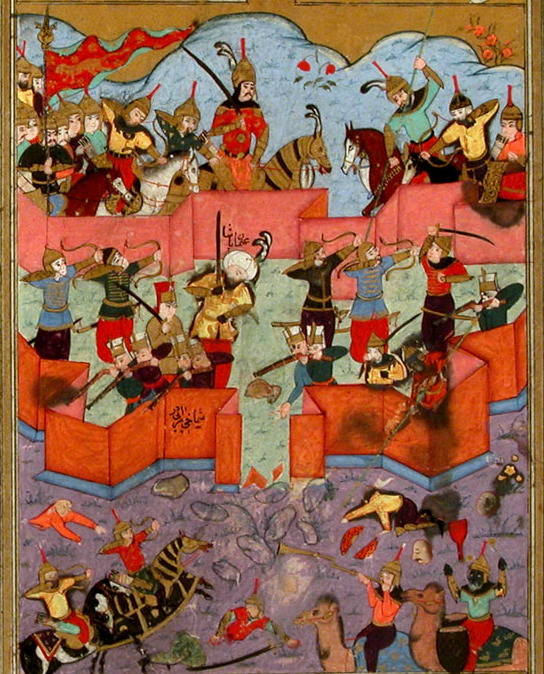
- The Safavids besieging Shamakhi (شماخی), with Osman Pasha (عثمان‌ پاشا) defending the city, in November 1578. Secaatname, 1586
Date	9–12 November 1578
Location	Shamakhi (present day Azerbaijan) 40°37′49″N 48°38′29″E
Result	Ottoman–Crimean victory

Belligerents
Safavid Iran	Ottoman Empire; Crimean Khanate

Commanders and leaders
(Safavid Iran) Aras Khan (executed)	(Ottoman Empire) Osman Pasha (Crimean Khanate) Adil Giray

Strength
20,000	15,000–20,000 Ottomans; 20,000–30,000 Crimean Tatars

Casualties and losses
10,000 killed	Unknown

The Siege of Shamakhi (Persian: محاصره شماخی) occurred during the Ottoman–Safavid War (1578–1590), as an attempt by the Safavids to capture the Ottoman stronghold of Shamakhi in 9-12 November 1578. Shamakhi had been conquered by the Ottomans at the onset of the war by the mid-autumn of 1578, together with the region of Georgia, and the major cities of Derbent and Baku. The author Asafi, secretary and hagiographer of Osman Pasha, was also present in Shamakhi during this period.

== Initial Safavid successes (November 9) ==
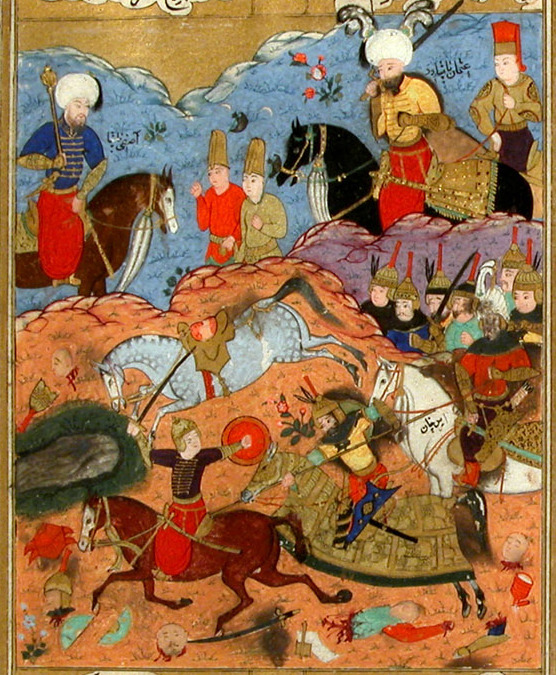
Aras Khan (center right) initially victoriously confronting the Ottomans (top left Asafi, top right Osman Pasha).

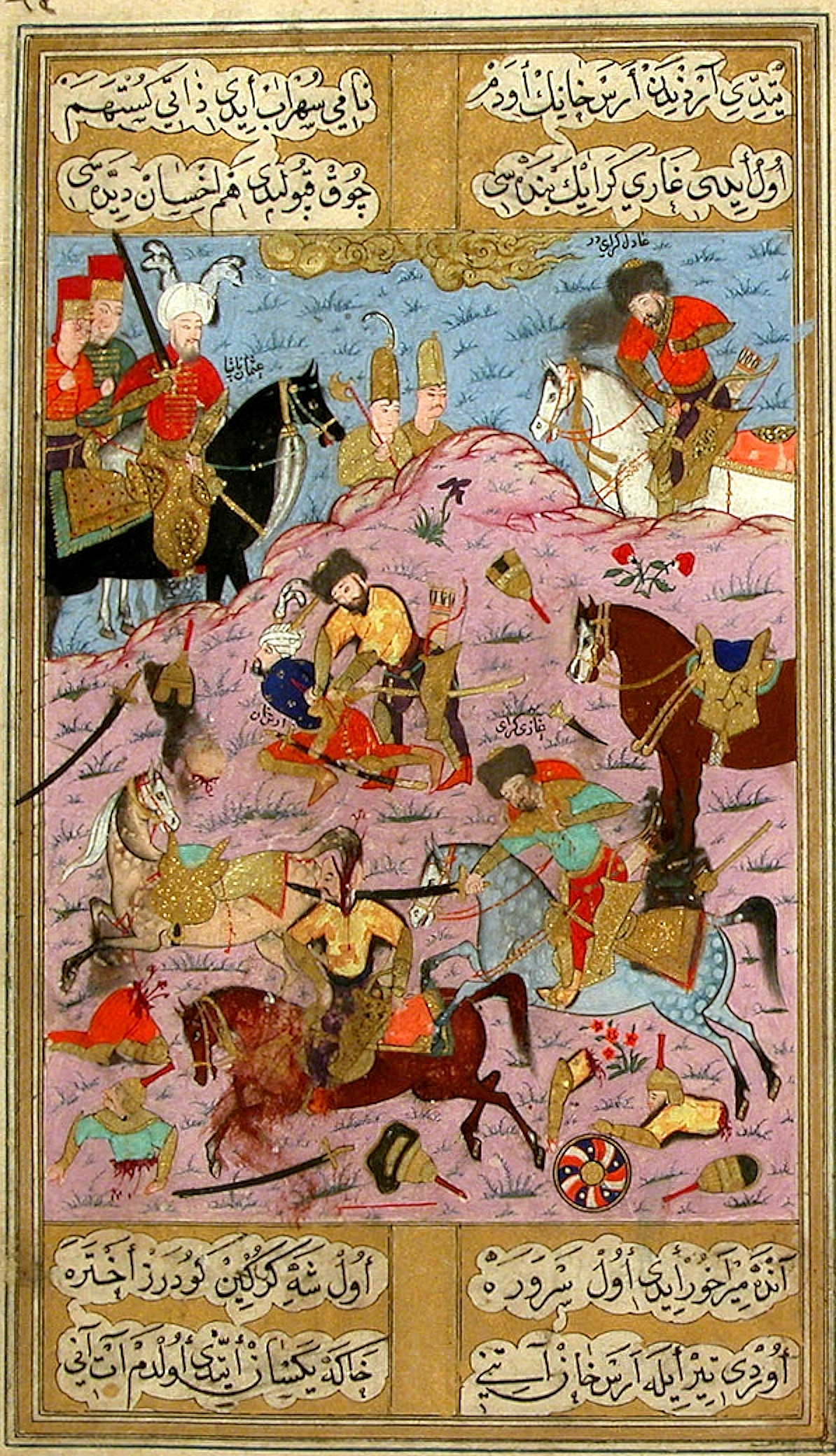
Crimean Tatars counter-attack at Shamakhi, and capture of Aras Khan, while Osman Pasha looks on, 12 November 1578. Secaatname (1586)

As the main Ottoman army under Lala Mustafa Pasha was leaving Shirvan, the Safavids sought to take advantage of the situation and sent an army of about 20,000 men under Aras Khan to Shirvan in October. Aras Khan soon captured the city of Eresh, and then proceeded to besiege Shamakhi, starting from 9 November 1578. There, in front of the Shamakhi castle, Osman Pasha successfully resisted the Safavid offensive, but was still pressured by superior Safavid numbers.

== Crimean counter-attack (November 12) ==
After three days of battle, an Ottoman-allied force of Crimean Tatars arrived, led by the Crimean Khan’s brothers (Adil Giray, Gazi Giray, Saadet Giray) and the Khan’s son Mübarek Giray, as well as the Khan’s deputy Hacı Mustafa Beğ, and the former ruler of Shirvanshah Sultan Burhan’s son Abu Bakr Mirza. These forces had received orders from the Ottoman Porte to help Osman Pasha’s force in Shirvan, once peace had been concluded between Crimea and Poland in September 1578. In total, these rescue forces numbered between 20,000 and 30,000.

The Safavids, being caught between these two forces, were severely defeated on 12 November, and their commander Aras Khan was executed. The Crimean Tatars were warmly welcomed by the Ottomans, but they took advantage of the situation and captured great quantities of booty and slaves.

== Aftermath ==
After this defeat, the Safavids soon came back to attack Shamakhi, this time with an army of 30,000-40,000, led by Prince Hamza Mirza and Selman Khan, the vizier of Shah Khodabanda. In the evening of 24 November 1578, the Safavid army confronted the main Crimean Tatar army on the plain near Mahmudabad, about 30km southwest of Shamakhi, in the Battle of Mollahasanli. This ended in a resounding victory for the Safavids, with Adil Giray being captured and then executed.

Following this defeat of the Crimean Tatars, Osman Pasha had to abandon Shamakhi and move his troops to Derbent, in order to avoid a direct confrontation with the superior forces of Selman Khan. These defeats nullified many of the Ottoman advances, who were forced to consolidate their forces in the Derbent area. Meanwhile, the main Ottoman army under Lala Mustafa Pasha spent the year of 1579 in the rear, rebuilding the fortress at Kars, while Osman Pasha remained in Derbent. The Crimean Tatars were charged with filling the gap between the two forces in the South Caucasus.

=== Later events ===
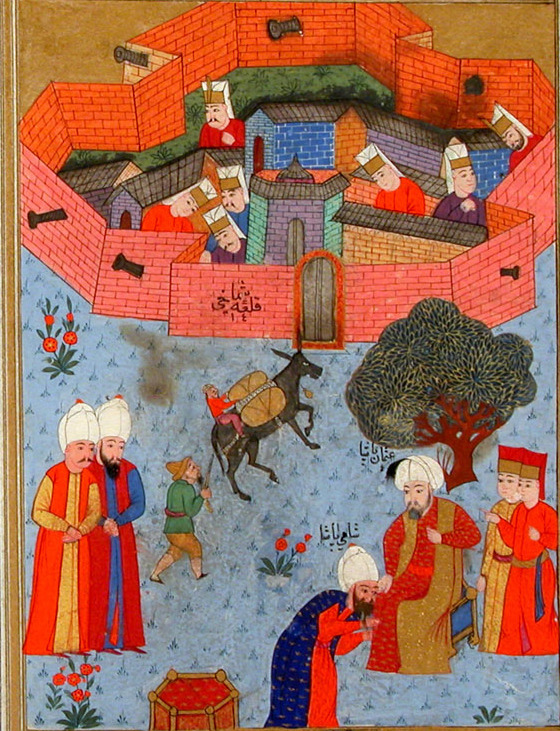
The new fortress of Shamakhi, built by Osman Pasha in 1583 (bottom right)

Despite this temporary Ottoman loss, the major Ottoman victory the Battle of Torches in May 1583 consolidated their dominance over the Caucasus, including Shirvan and Dagestan, until the end of the war. The Ottomans then built a fortress at Shamakhi in 1583. The Treaty of Constantinople (1590) formally confirmed Ottoman control over Shirvan, along with other vast Safavid territories in the Caucasus and Azerbaijan. The Ottomans eventually lost Shamaki, but not until the next conflict, the Ottoman–Safavid war (1603–1612), when Shah Abbas I launched a massive counter-offensive against the Ottoman Empire. Shah Abbas besieged and captured Shahmakhi in June 1607, ending 28 years of Ottoman rule there.

== Sources ==
- Eravci, H. Mustafa (18 April 2023). "The Role of the Crimean Tatars in the Ottoman-Safavi Wars". Selçuk Üniversitesi Türkiyat Araştırmaları Dergisi (57): 25. doi:10.21563/sutad.1285102.
- Afyoncu, Erhan (1 November 2022). Ottoman Sultans (Yeditepe Yayınevi). Yeditepe Yayınevi. p. 60. ISBN 978-625-8396-78-2.
- Gibb, H. A. R.; Donzel, E. van; Bearman, P. J.; Lent, J. van (September 1996). The Encyclopaedia of Islam. BRILL. p. 143. ISBN 978-90-04-10633-8.
