= Ahmad Ghaffari Qazvini =

16th-century Iranian scribe and historian

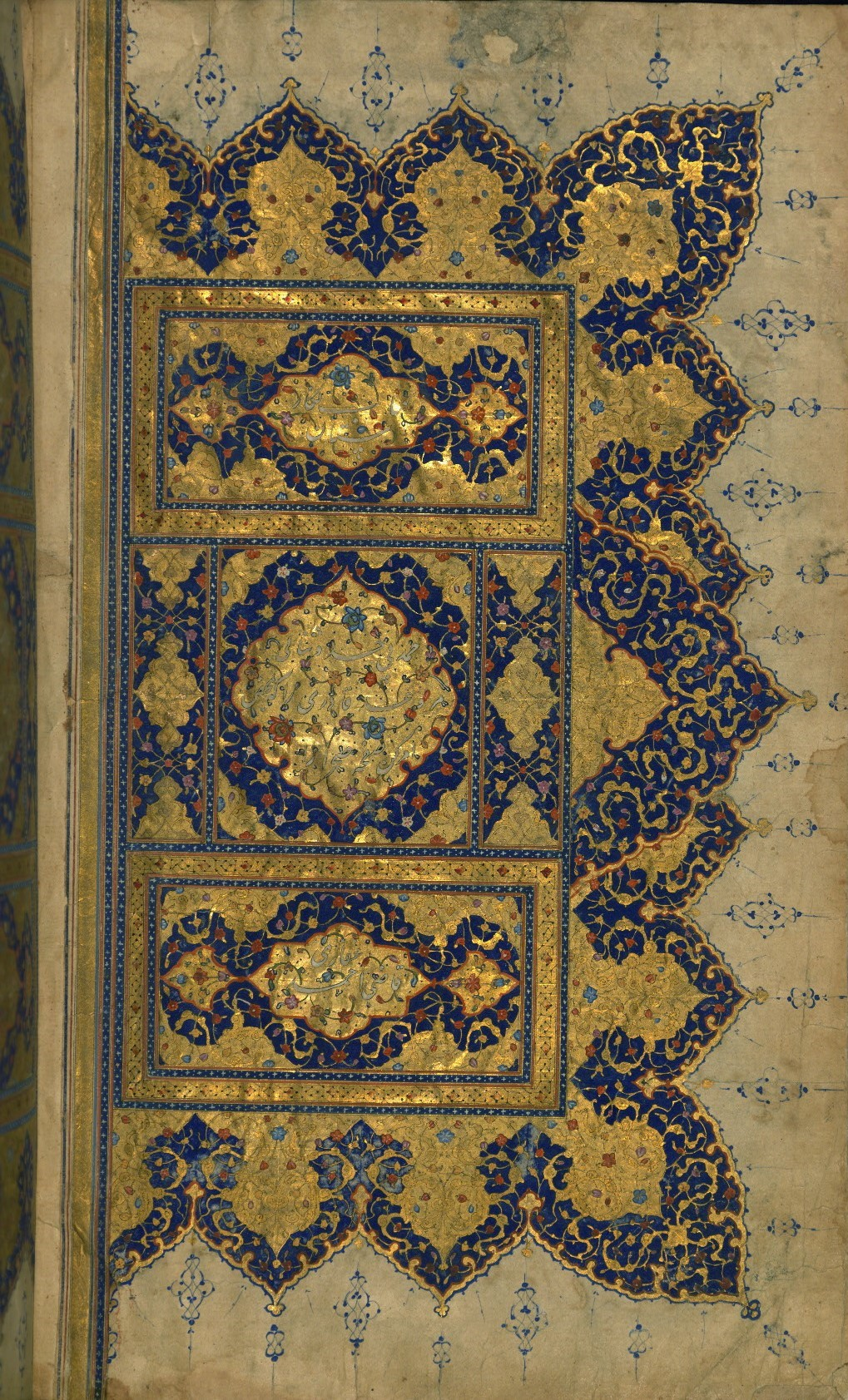
- The right side of a double-page illuminated frontispiece in the Tarikh-e negarestan, showing the name of Ahmad Ghaffari Qazvini
- Born: Qazvin, Iran
- Died: 1568; Debal
- Occupations: Scribe and historian
- Relatives: Mohammad Ghaffari (father); Abd-al-Ghaffar (paternal grandfather)
- Writing career
- Language: Persian
- Notable works: Nosakh-e jahan-ara Tarikh-e negarestan

Ahmad Ghaffari Qazvini (Persian: احمد غفاری قزوینی: died 1568) was a scribe and historian in Safavid Iran, who composed two Persian universal histories, the Nosakh-e jahan-ara and Tarikh-e negarestan.

A native of Qazvin, Ahmad Ghaffari belonged to a distinguished lineage, known for their roles as scholars and officials. His family was descended from Najm al-Din al-Qazwini al-Katibi (died 1266), a prominent scholar of the Shafi'i school in Sunni Islam. Ahmad Ghaffari's paternal grandfather Abd-al-Ghaffar served as the army judge (qazi-e mo'askar) under the Aq Qoyunlu. Ahmad Ghaffari's father Mohammad Ghaffari (died 1525) held the office of chief judge of Ray during the reign of Shah Ismail I (r. 1501–1524), and was also a cousin of Qazi Isa Savaji (died 1491), a distinguished vizier of the Aq Qoyunlu.

Ahmad Ghaffari began his career under Shah Tahmasp I as a court scribe but soon found himself working for the latters younger brother Sam Mirza. In 1552, Ahmad Ghaffari composed the Tarikh-e negarestan and dedicated it to Shah Tahmasp I. In 1563/64, he composed the Nosakh-e jahan-ara, which was also dedicated to Shah Tahmasp I. Ahmad Ghaffari traveled to the Hijaz on a pilgrimage later in Shah Tahmasp I's reign. He traveled to Mughal India in 1568 from the Hijaz, but died in Debal, a port city in the Sindh region near present-day Karachi in Pakistan.

== Sources ==
- Ghereghlou, Kioumars (2020). "Ḡaffāri Qazvini, Aḥmad". Encyclopaedia Iranica Online. Brill. doi:10.1163/2330-4804_EIRO_COM_11942.
- Quinn, Sholeh A. (2020). Persian Historiography Across Empires: The Ottomans, Safavids, and Mughals. Cambridge University Press. ISBN 978-1108842211.
- Trausch, Tilmann (2021). "Continuing a legacy in times of change". In Matthee, Rudi (ed.). The Safavid World. Routledge. pp. 182–200. ISBN 978-1138944060.
