= Aras Khan =

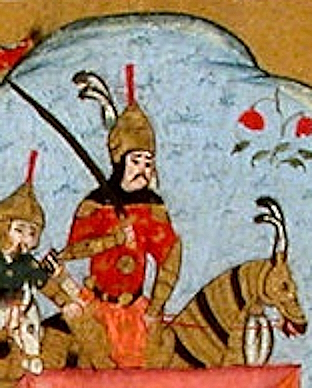
- Aras Khan on horse in the Siege of Shamakhi, 9-11 November 1578. Secaatname (1586)

Beglerbeg of Shirvan
- Monarch: Mohammad Khodabanda

Personal details
- Died: 12 November 1578 Shamakhi
- Tribe: Rumlu

Military service
- Allegiance: Safavid Iran
- Battles/wars: Ottoman–Safavid War (1578–1590); Siege of Shamakhi (1578) (executed)

Aras Khan (آراس خان), also Aras Khan Rumlu was a member of the Rumlu tribe of Turkomen Qızılbash nomads, and Safavid Empire Beylerbey of Shirvan.

During the Ottoman–Safavid War (1578–1590), the Ottoman Empire sultan Murad III ordered the Crimeans to fight the Persians near the southwest corner of the Caspian Sea. Mehmed sent 20,000 men under his brothers Adil, Mubarak and Gazi. After a 3-month march along the north side of the Caucasus and down the Caspian coast in November they reached Safavid Shirvan (approximately modern Azjerbaijan) and joined Özdemiroğlu Osman Pasha. They completely defeated 25,000 Persians under Shirvan Beylerbey Aras Khan Rumlu who were besieging Shamakhi.

The battle for Shamakhi began on 9 November 1578 and lasted for several days. On the morning of the third day, the brother of the Crimean Khan, Adil Giray, at the head of 15,000 Tatar horsemen, came to the aid of the Ottomans; this decided the outcome of the battle and the Safavids were defeated. Aras Khan and his son were taken prisoners by the mirakhur Adil Giray and were executed. The losses on both sides were enormous.

This victory gave the Ottomans control of the Western Caspian region, and access to Azerbaijan and Armenia. They moved south to the Mugan plain where they defeated the Rumlu tribe of Qazilbash nomads. During this period, the Georgians allied with the Ottomans.

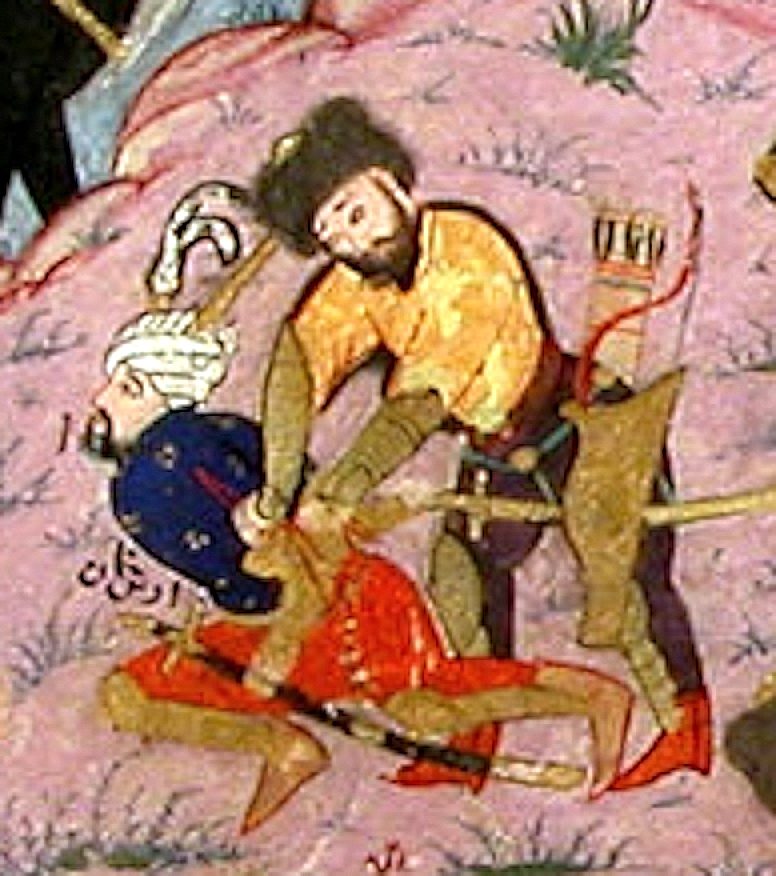
Aras Khan Rumlu captured by a Crimean Khanate warrior of Adil Giray, in November 1578. Şeca'atname (1586)

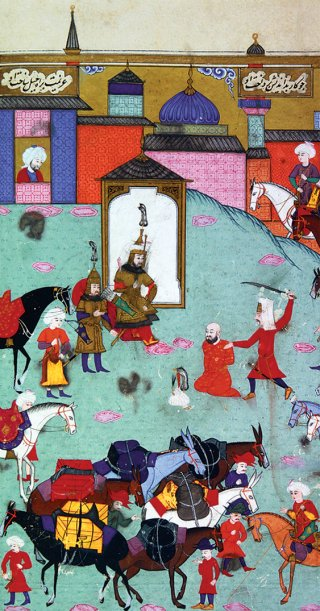
Decapitation of Aras Khan, on order of Adil Giray in 1578. Şahanşahname, 1581

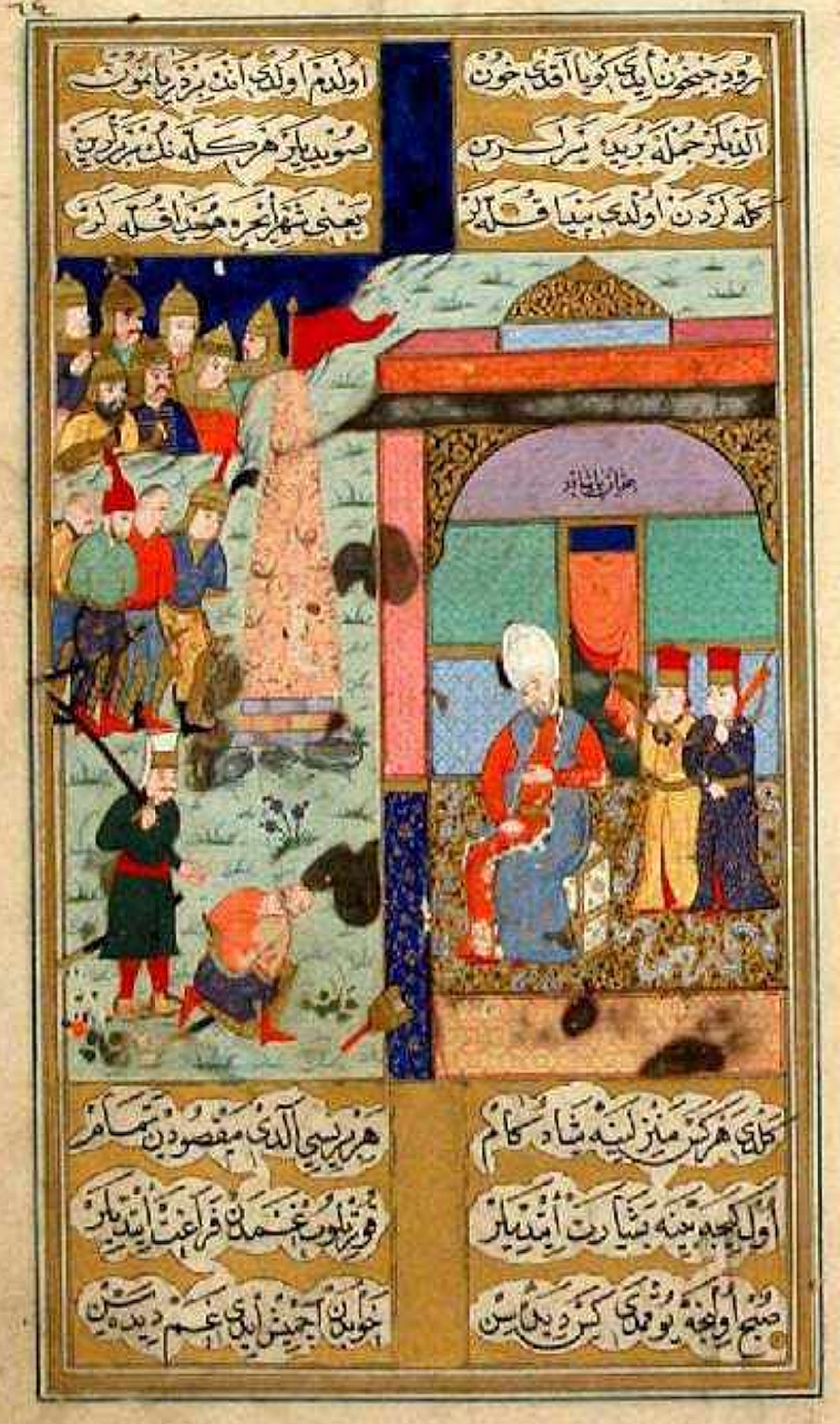
Decapitation of Aras Khan, next to a tower of skulls. Şeca'atname (1586)

== Sources ==
- Don Juan of Persia (2007). Россия и Европа глазами Орудж-бека Баята - Дон Жуана Персидского / Oktay Afandiyev and Farzaliyev Akif. Sankt-Peterburg: Saint Petersburg State University.
- İbrahim Peçevi (1988). История / Ziya Bunyadov. Baku: Elm.
- Фарах Гусейн (2005). Османо-Сефевидская война 1578 - 1590 гг.: по материалам трудов османского летописца Ибрахима Рахимизаде. Baku: Nurlan.
- Sharafkhan Bidlisi (1967). Шараф-наме / E. I. Vasilyeva. Moscow: Nauka.
- Iskandar Beg Munshi. History Of Shah Abbas The Great Vol. 1 / Roger M. Savory. — Boulder, Colorado: Westview Press, 1930. (1930). History Of Shah Abbas The Great Vol. 1 / Roger M. Savory. Colorado: Westview Press.
- Купели Озер (2014). Походы крымских татар и турок-осман против Ирана. Золотоордынское обозрение.
- Çiçek Kemal (2007). Osman Paşa, Özdemiroğlu // Islam ansiklopedisi.
- Farah Hüseyn (2019). Farah Hüseyn. 1578-1590 Osmanlı-Safevî Savaşı ve Kırım Hanlığı (Османо-сефевидская война 1578-1590-х гг. и Крымское ханство). Akademik Tarih ve Düşünce Dergisi.
- Kütükoğlu Bekir (1962). Osmanli-Iran Siyâsî münâsebetleri. Edebiyat Fakültesi Matbaasi.
