= Asafi =

Dal Mehmed Çelebi
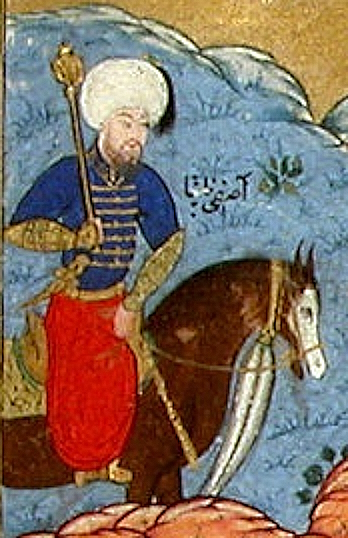
- Asafi Pasha fighting the Safavid Aras Khan in 1578. Şeca'atname

Governor of Caffa
- Incumbent
- Assumed office 1585

Governor of Sirvan
- Incumbent
- Assumed office 1588

Governor of Caffa
- Incumbent
- Assumed office 1593

Personal details
- Born: Serres (Siroz), Macedonia
- Died: 1597–98

Military service
- Allegiance: Ottoman Empire

Asafi (Ottoman Turkish: آصفی; Turkish: Asafi, "Asif-like"), also Asafi Pasha, is the penname ("mahlas") of Dal Mehmed Çelebi (d. 1597–98), author of the Book of Valor or Book of Bravery (شجاعة نامه, Şecāʿatnāme or Šajāʿat-nāme, completed in September 1586), an illustrated record of the exploits of the Ottoman statesman and general Özdemiroǧlu Osman Pasha during the Ottoman–Safavid War (1578–1590).

Asafi was born in Serres (Siroz) in Macedonia. He was a blood-relative of Osman Pasha, who was himself of Circassian origin. He was at the same time a bureaucrat, a man of letters and a military man. Asafi grew up and was educated at the court of Lala Mustafa Paşa. He had a brother who was a high-ranking soldier and also participated to the eastern campaigns and died against the Russians.

Asafi was a secretary for Lala Mustafa Paşa, and then joined the conflict in 1578 and became secretary and administrative assistant (tezkereci) for Özdemiroǧlu Osman Pasha, after the Ottoman victory of the Battle of Çıldır. He was also in charge of the tax census (tahrir) for the nearly conquered area of Shirvan.

From 1579, Asafi attempted to protect Shirvan against the counter-attacks of the Safavids, together with Kayki Mustafa Bey on his side.

In 1581, Asafi was captured by the Safavid Kizilbas as he was holding the garrison of Qabala castle. He was kept in captivity in Qazvin and Isfahan, but was released in 1585, finaling rejoining Osman Pasha. He participated to the Capture of Tabriz (1585). After Tabriz, Osman Pasha made him governor-general (beylerbeyi) of Kefe (Caffa) in Crimea but he was suspended by Ferhat Pasha when Osman Pasha died that same year.

Asafi then returned to Istanbul. His Book of Valor, completed in 1586, deals with the event of the Ottoman-Safavid wars between 1578 and 1585. It belongs to the genre of the Gazaname ("War Saga"). There are two copies: one, unillustrated, is in the Topkapı Palace Museum Library (R. 1301), and the other, illustrated, at the Istanbul University Rare Books and Manuscripts Library (T.6043). Both manuscripts were copied by ʿAli b. Yūsuf. The Book of Valor is written in Turkish, in the naskh script and uses rather plain language. It represents a developing trend in Ottoman literature, away from the Persianate aesthetic in terms of both visual idiom and language, where court histories were written by bureaucrats rather than poets, using plain Turkish rather than Persian, and employing the naskh and dîvânî scripts rather than the poetic ta'liq. Still, Asafi displayed a taste for Persian literature, and his illustrations have Persian characteristics.

Due to his skills and accomplishments, in 1588 Asafi was appointed to the position of sanjak governor (sanjak beiyi) in charge of safeguarding Shirvan and Dagestan. Asafi had a remarkable career progression, from scribe to financial official and member of a Pasha's household, to Sancak (Governor) Begi, and then to Pasha.

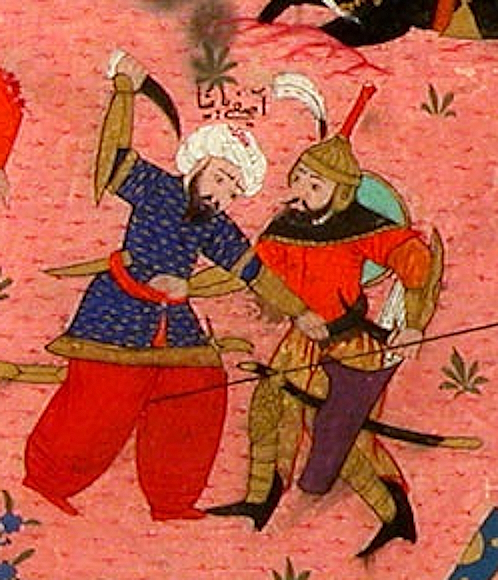
Asafi Pasha fighting a Safavid soldier when he was captured in 1581

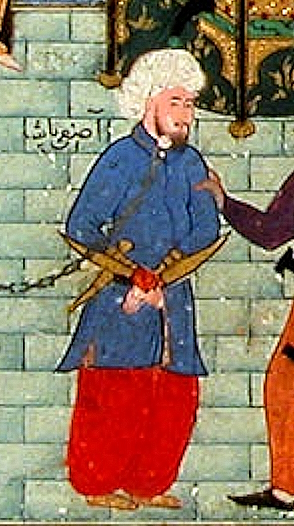
The author, Dal Mehmed Çelebi Asafi, imprisoned in 1581 at the Safavid court of Mohammad Khodabanda

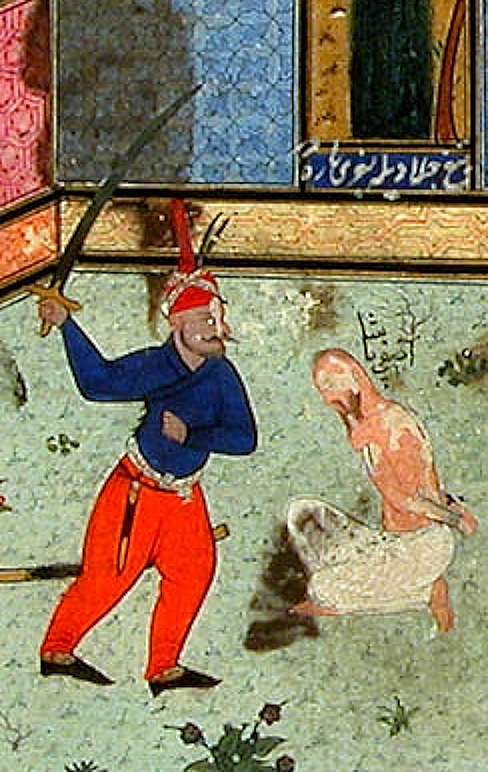
Asafi nearing execution by the Safavids

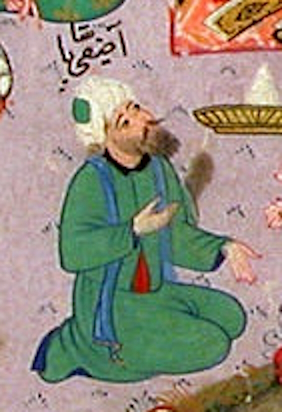
Āṣafī Paşa as a captive, pleading for his release to Ḥamza Mirzā in 1585

== Sources ==
- Eravci, H. Mustafa (18 April 2023). "The Role of the Crimean Tatars in the Ottoman-Safavi Wars". Selçuk Üniversitesi Türkiyat Araştırmaları Dergisi (57). doi:10.21563/sutad.1285102.
- Fleischer, Cornell H. (1986). Bureaucrat and Intellectual in the Ottoman Empire: The Historian Mustafa Ali (1541-1600). Princeton University Press. ISBN 978-0691638447.
- Taner, Melis (2020). "Illustrated Manuscripts Attributed to Baghdad". Caught in a whirlwind: a cultural history of Ottoman Baghdad as reflected in its illustrated manuscripts. Leiden; Boston: Brill. ISBN 978-9004412699.
- Tunca, Ece (2017). Depiction of the enemy through the eyes of an Ottoman bureaucrat (thesis) (PDF). Budapest: Central European University.
