= Qabala castle =

Coordinates: 40.889794°N 47.708209°E

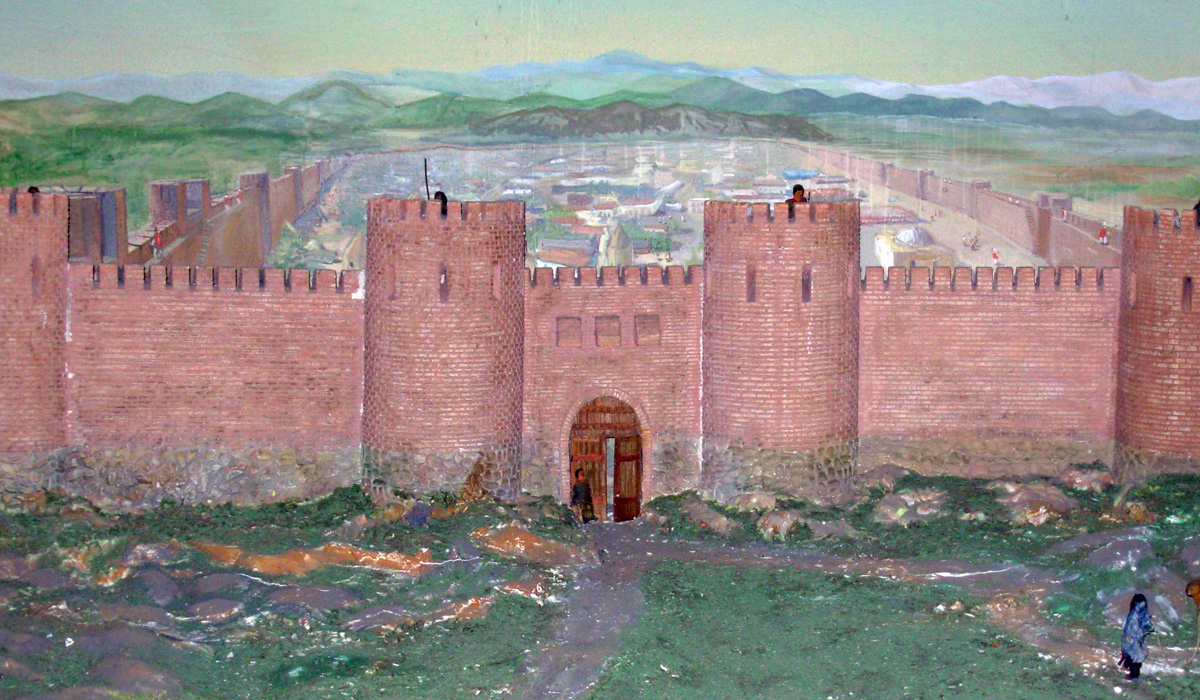
Qabala castle (reconstruction)

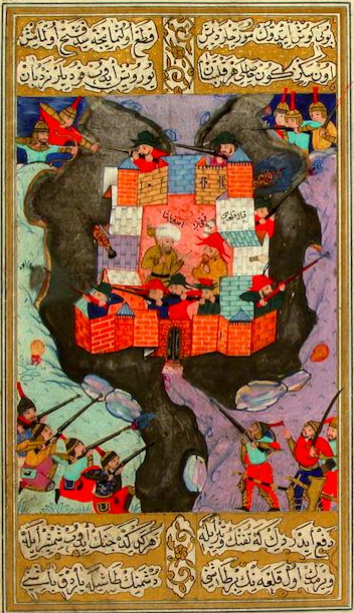
Asafi and Kayki bey in Qabala castle besieged by Safavids in 1581

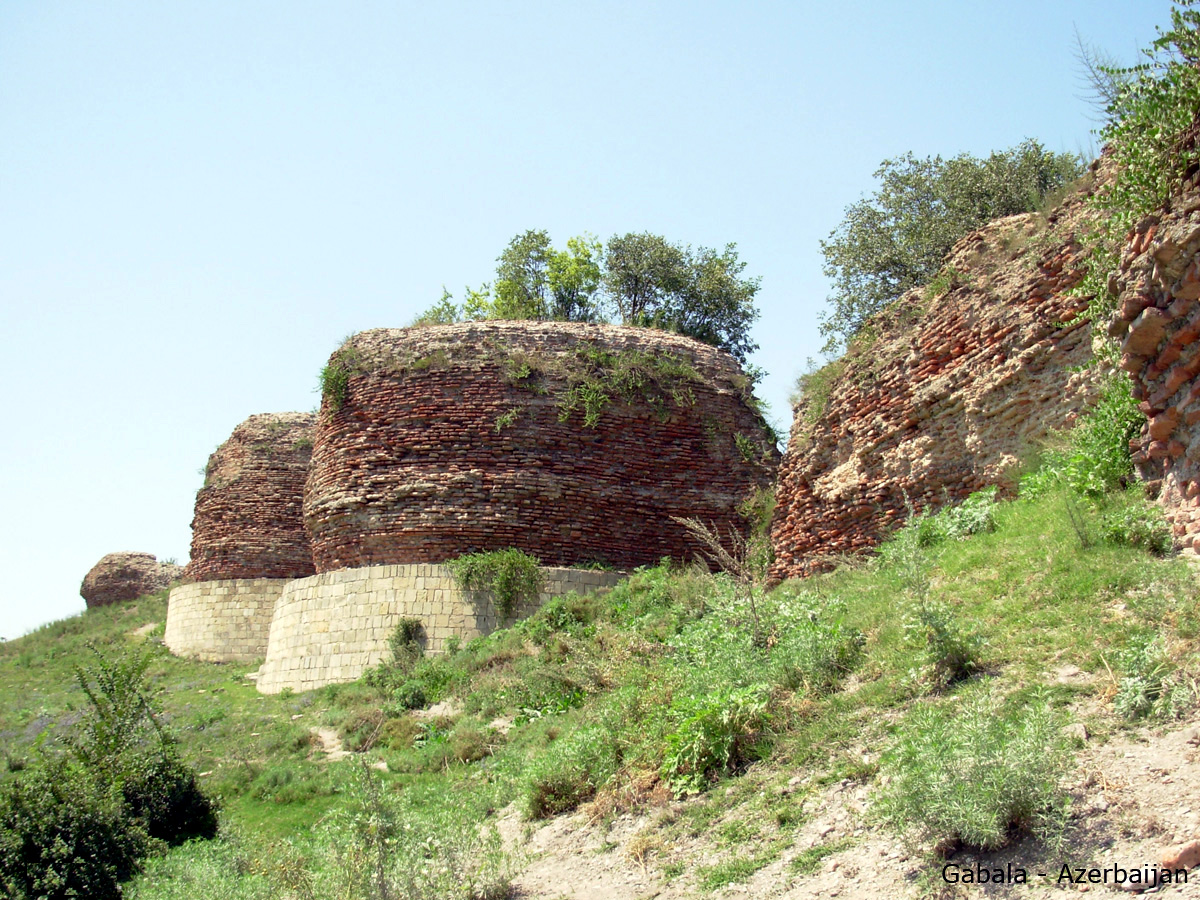
Ruins today

The Qabala castle, also Gabala castle or Kabala castle, was an ancient castle near modern Çuxur Qəbələ, in ancient Shirvan, modern Qabala Rayon of Azerbaijan.

== Safavid occupation (1538) ==
The Qalaba castle was already an important strategic position when the Safavid invaded Shirvan in 1538. At that time Shirvan was in chaos following the death of Khalilullah II in 1535. The Shirvanese nobles brought Shahrukh, his nephew from Gazikumukh Shamkhalate and enthroned him, instead of Khalilullah's half-Safavid son Burhan Ali. This triggered Qalandar revolt. This was enough excuse for Safavid forces to intervene to "quell disarray".

In March 1538 Tahmasp I ordered Alqas Mirza to move against Shirvan. After crossing Kura river with 300 men-strong garrison and 20,000 soldiers and occupying Surkhab (near modern Ərəb, Agdash) and Qabala castles and moved on to besiege Gulustan Fortress which was being defended by Nimatullah beg. Tahmasp subsequently ordered the Bughurt Fortress to be demolished on 19 October and appointed Alqas as first beylerbey of Shirvan, ending 677-year-long independent state of Shirvanshahs.

== Ottoman-Safavid war (1578-1590) ==
From 1579, the Ottoman Empire commanders Kayki Mustafa Bey and Asafi were missioned to protect the recently conquered Shirvan against the counter-attacks of the Safavids. Osman Pasha ordered them to reinforce the fortifications of Qabala castle. In 1581, the Qabala castle was captured following a Safavid ruse, in which they used false letters and Korans to suggest the war had ended. The Ottoman garrison fell, and Asafi was captured by the Safavid Kizilbas.

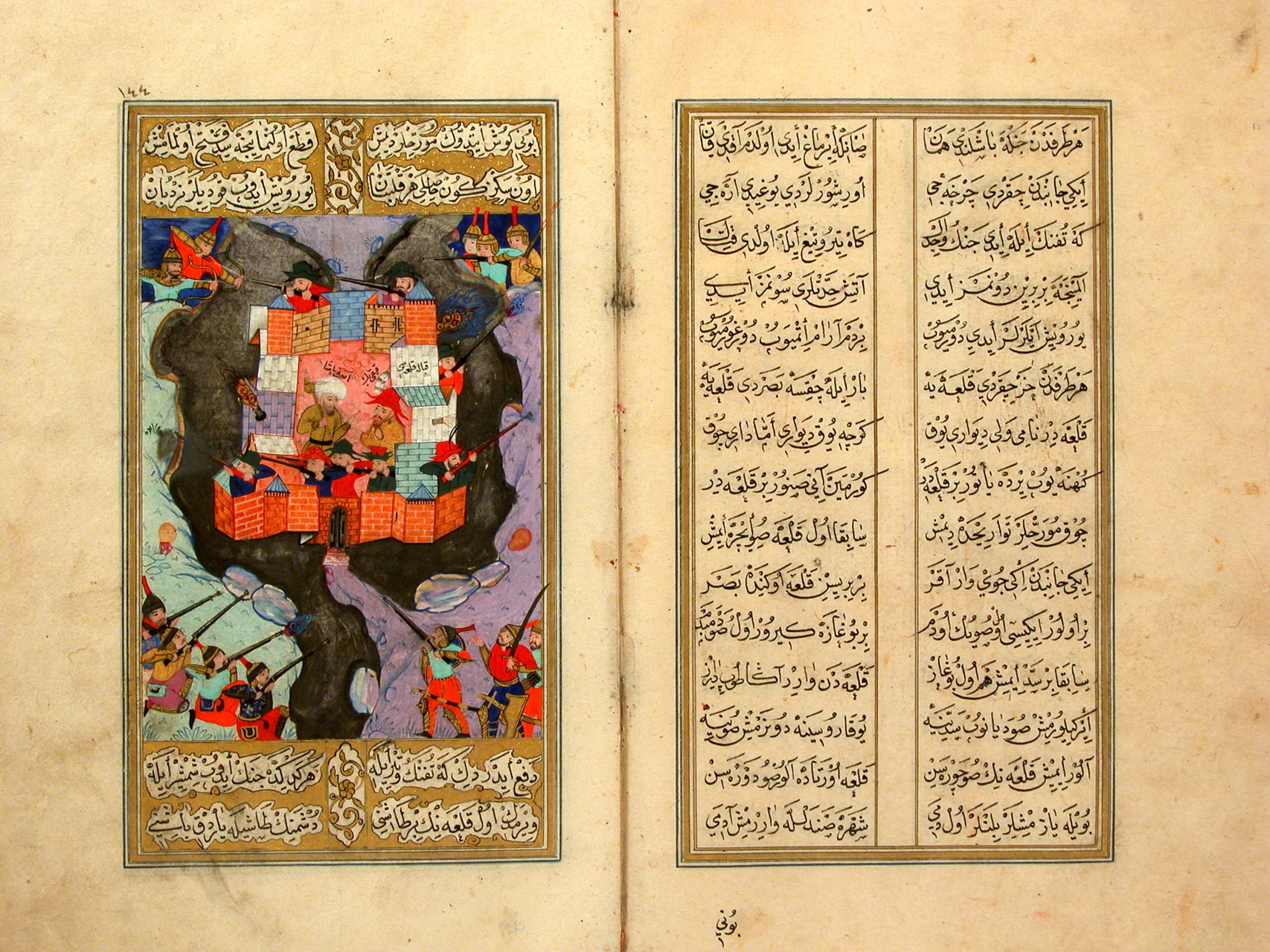
Âsafi and Kaykı Bey in the Qabala Castle besieged by the Safavids

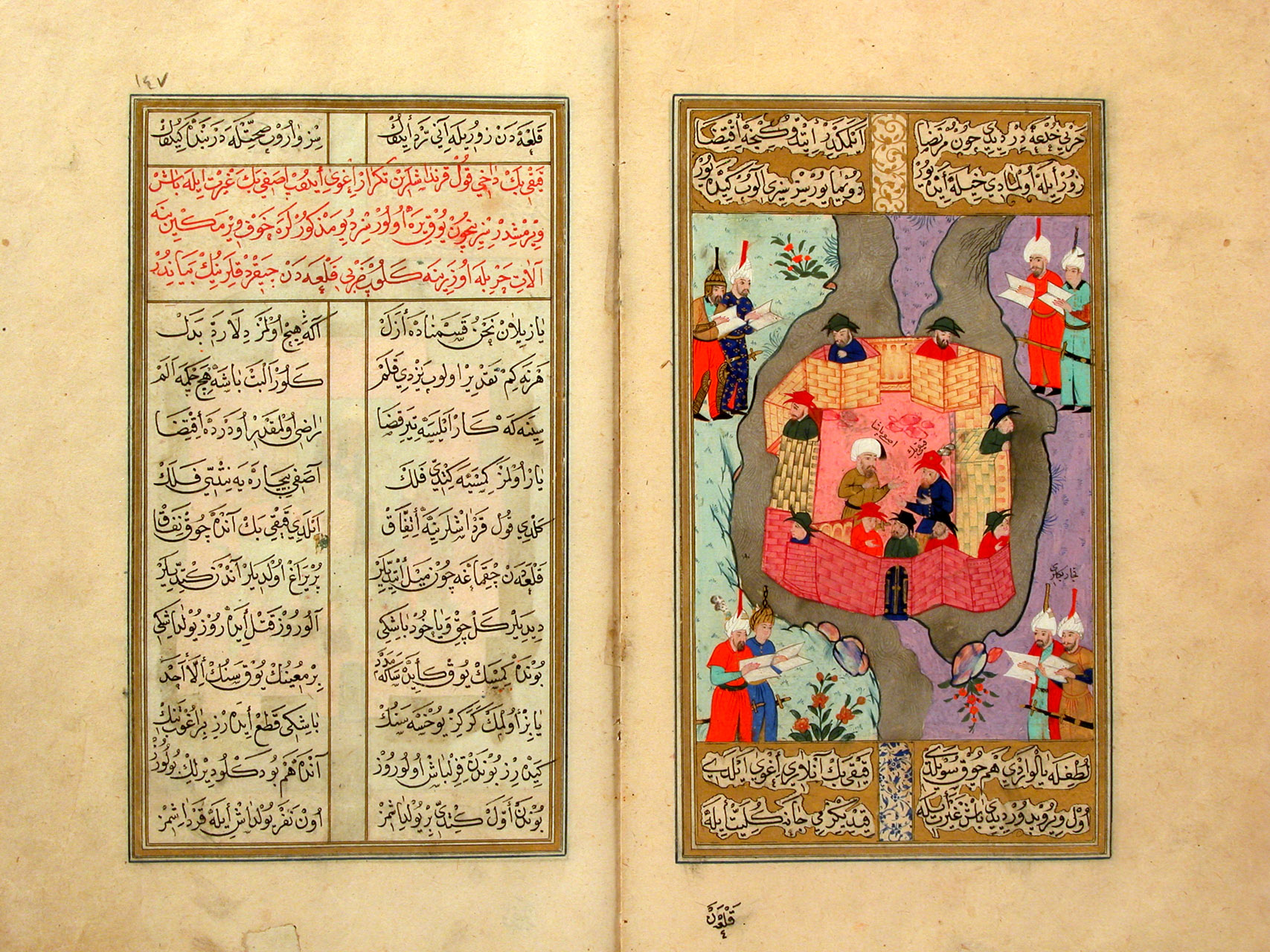
The Safavid ruse

== Sources ==
- Fleischer, Cornell H. (1986). Bureaucrat and Intellectual in the Ottoman Empire: The Historian Mustafa Ali (1541-1600). Princeton University Press. ISBN 978-0691638447.
- Taner, Melis (2020). "Illustrated Manuscripts Attributed to Baghdad". Caught in a whirlwind: a cultural history of Ottoman Baghdad as reflected in its illustrated manuscripts. Leiden; Boston: Brill. ISBN 978-9004412699.
- Tunca, Ece (2017). Depiction of the enemy through the eyes of an Ottoman bureaucrat (thesis) (PDF). Budapest: Central European University.
