= Hasan Beg Rumlu =

Iranian historian (1530/31 – c. 1578)

- Born: 1530/1531; Qom, Safavid Iran
- Died: c. 1578
- Other names: Hasan Soltan Rumlu
- Known for: Aḥsān al-tavārikh

Hasan Beg Rumlu (Persian: حسن بیگ روملو, 1530 or 1531 – c. 1578) was a 16th-century Safavid historian and military officer. A cavalryman of the qurchi corps, he is principally known for his chronicle of Safavid history; the Aḥsān al-tavārikh.

== Biography ==
Most information about Hasan Beg's life stems from his own work, the Aḥsān al-tavārikh, which he completed in 1578. (Note: According to Quinn / Encyclopædia Iranica (2003), the Aḥsān al-tavārikh was "originally intended as a twelve-volume general history, of which only the last two volumes have survived". According to Quinn & Melville (2012): "he [Hasan Beg Rumlu] was a prolific writer if we are to believe that there were originally twelve volumes in his chronicle".) He was born in Qom, a member of the Turkoman Rumlu tribe, and the grandson of Amir Soltan Rumlu, a prominent Qizilbash lord who served during the reign of King (Shah) Ismail I (r. 1501–1524). Hasan Beg's Qizilbash background makes him "somewhat unique in the annals of Safavid historiography". After his grandfather's death in 1539 or 1540, Hasan Beg found himself unable to gain command over his grandfather's army, because, according to his own explanation, "he was busy with his unpleasant duties as a qurchi". Though a military officer, Hasan Beg "received the sort of training that was typical of a Persian administrator and bureaucrat". For example, among other subjects he studied works on logic as well as the art of calligraphy.

In 1541–1542, Hasan Beg accompanied King Tahmasp I (r. 1524–1576) on an expedition to Dezful, and from then he "was with the royal camp in all its journeys, and saw most events with his own eyes, thus becoming an eyewitness to most of the subsequent military events that he described". In 1546–1547, some five years after the Dezful campaign, Hasan Beg fought in Tahmasp I's Georgian campaigns. The last military episode in which Hasan Beg reports his own involvement was Tahmasp I's battle against the Ardalan Kurds in 1550.

Though Hasan Beg does not mention his involvement in succession matters after the death of Tahmasp I, contemporary author Abd-ol-Hossein Nava'i suggests that Hasan Beg sided with the other Rumlu's, who sought to install Prince Ismail Mirza (later known regnally as Ismail II; r. 1576–1577) on the throne and who were adversaries of the pro-Haydar Mirza camp. Nava'i suggests that Hasan Beg may have been part of the Rumlu qurchis who took part in the murder of Haydar Mirza. When Ismail II died in 1577, Hasan Beg became part of the royal retinue of his successor, Mohammad Khodabanda (r. 1578–1587).

Hasan Beg's "most enduring legacy is historiographical". Later Safavid historians (e.g. Iskander Beg Munshi) used material from Hasan Beg's Aḥsān al-tavārikh in the sections of their works related to the rule of king Tahmasp I. Hasan Beg's work was used by Fazli Isfahani Khuzani for his Afżal al-tavārikh and also survives in "a very late cluster of mostly anonymous semi-fictional accounts of early Safavid history such as the ʿĀlamārā-ye Shah Esmāʿil". Later historians also quoted material from Hasan Beg's work, even though they did not mention Hasan Beg by name.

== Sources ==
- Quinn, Sholeh (2003). "ḤASAN BEG RUMLU". In Yarshater, Ehsan (ed.). Encyclopædia Iranica. Vol. XII/1: Harem I–Hedāyat al-mota'allemin. London and New York: Routledge & Kegan Paul. pp. 31–32. ISBN 978-0-933273-74-0.
- Quinn, Sholeh; Melville, Charles (2012). Yarshater, Ehsan; Melville, Charles (eds.). Persian Historiography: History of Persian Literature A, Vol X (A History of Persian Literature). I.B.Tauris. ISBN 978-1845119119.
