= Habib al-siyar =

Literary work on history by the Persian historian Khvandamir (AD 16th century)

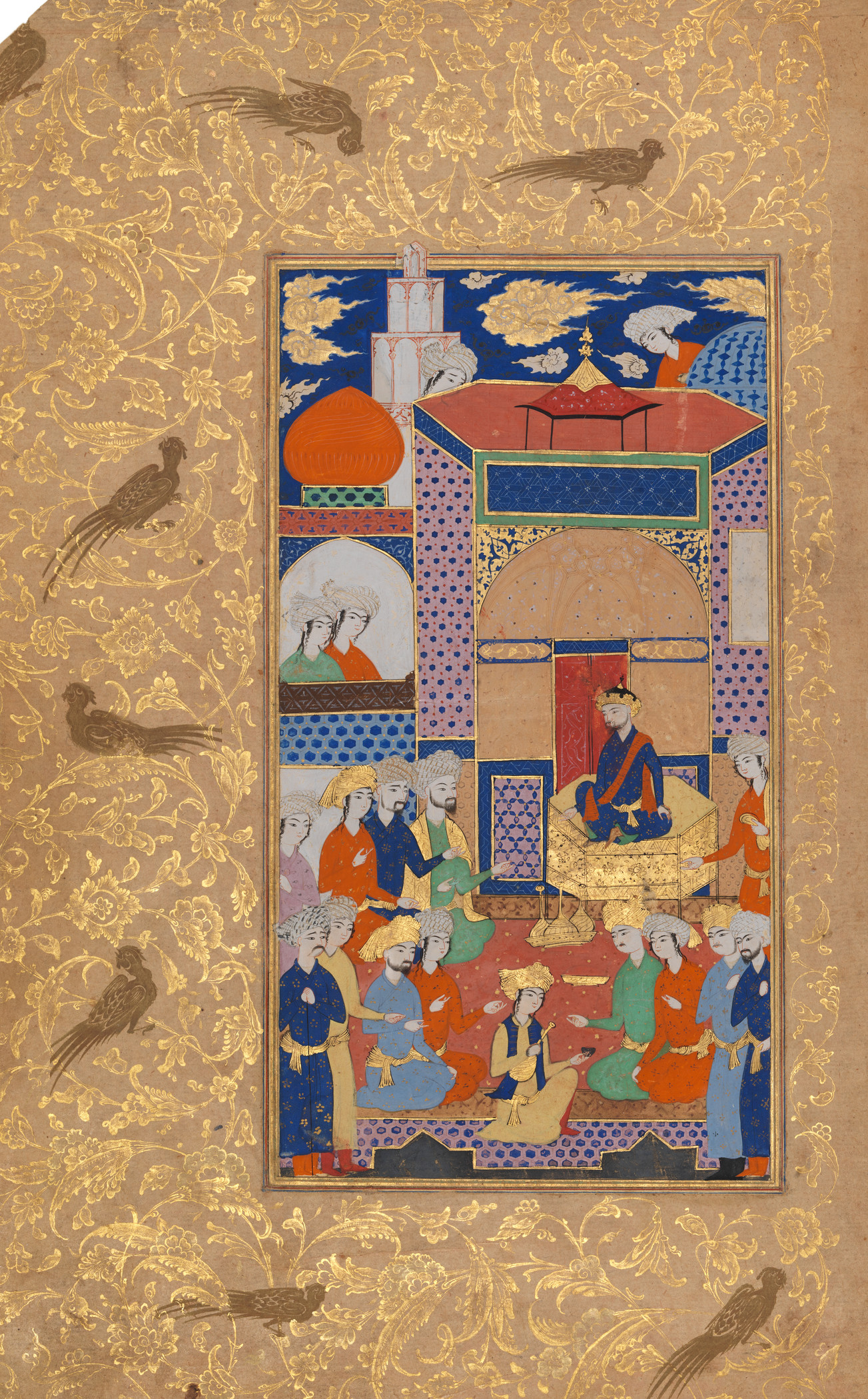
A court scene from a manuscript of the Habib al-Siyar. Copy made in Safavid Iran, dated 1625

The Ḥabīb al-siyar fī akhbār afrād al-bashar (Persian: حبیب السیر فی اخبار افراد البشر; "The beloved of careers reporting on the multitudes of people") is a universal history by the Persian historian Khvandamir (died 1535/6).

== See also ==
- Nosakh-e jahan-ara

== Sources ==
- Bockholt, Philip (2020). "Khvāndamīr". In Fleet, Kate; Krämer, Gudrun; Matringe, Denis; Nawas, John; Rowson, Everett (eds.). Encyclopaedia of Islam (3rd ed.). Brill Online. ISSN 1873-9830.
