= Fotuhat-e shahi =

Safavid chronicle (1531)

The Fotuhat-e shahi (Persian: فتوحات شاهی, lit. 'Royal Victories/Conquests'), also known as Fotuhat-e Amini, is a Persian historical chronicle composed by Amini Haravi in 1531 in Safavid Iran. It is considered to be the first Safavid chronicle. Despite being intended as a universal history, it mainly emphasizes on the life of Shah Ismail I (r. 1501–1524), with the story abruptly concluding in the start of 1514.

== Sources ==
- Anooshahr, Ali (2021). "The Body Politic and the Rise of the Safavids". In Melville, Charles (ed.). Safavid Persia in the Age of Empires, the Idea of Iran Vol. 10. Bloomsbury Publishing. pp. 13–28. ISBN 978-0755633777.
- Quinn, Sholeh; Melville, Charles (2012). "Chapter 5: Safavid historiography". In Melville, Charles (ed.). Persian Historiography: History of Persian Literature A, Vol X (A History of Persian Literature). I.B.Tauris. pp. 209–254. ISBN 978-1845119119.
- Quinn, Sholeh (2020). "Historiography vi. Safavid Period". Encyclopaedia Iranica Online. Brill. doi:10.1163/2330-4804_EIRO_COM_3101.
- Trausch, Tilmann (2021). "Continuing a legacy in times of change". In Matthee, Rudi (ed.). The Safavid World. Routledge. pp. 182–200. ISBN 978-1138944060.
