= Nosakh-e jahan-ara =

16th-century Persian universal history

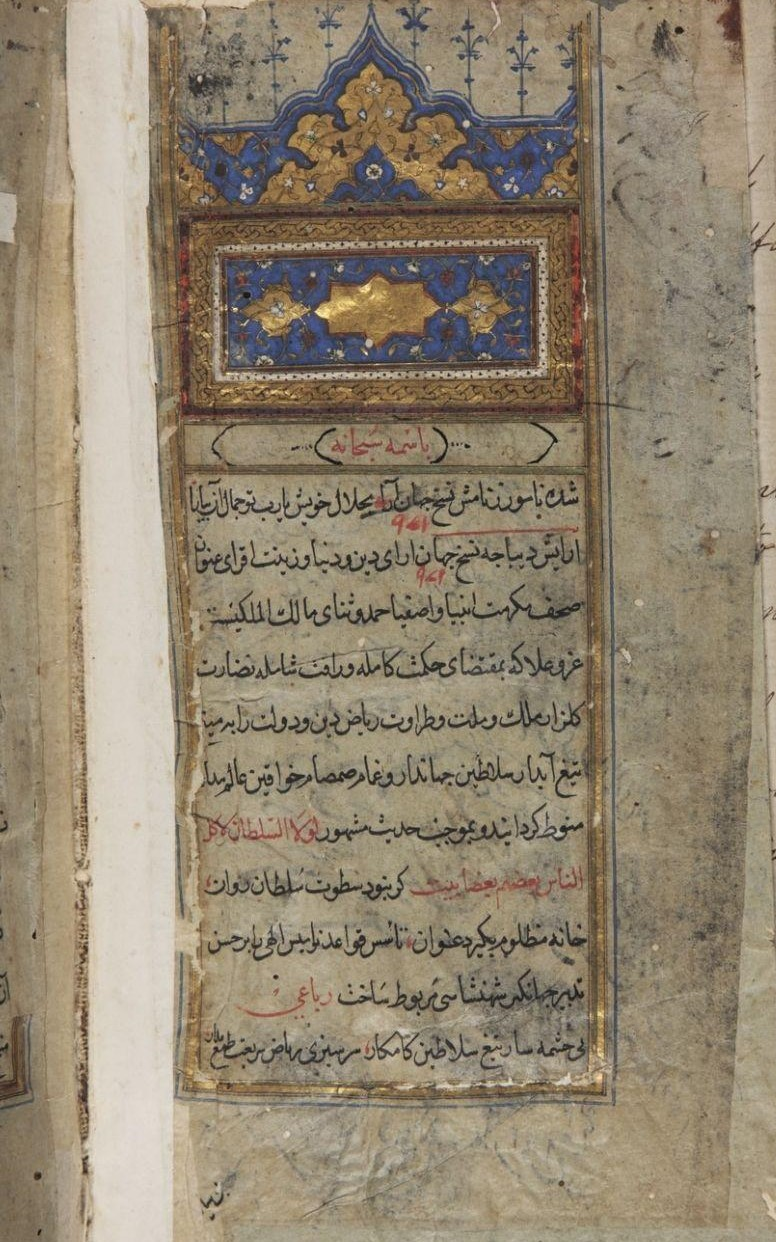
- Folio of the Nosakh-e jahan-ara, created in Safavid Iran during the 17th-century
- Author: Ahmad Ghaffari Qazvini
- Language: Persian
- Genre: Universal history
- Publication date: 1563/64
- Publication place: Safavid Iran

The Nosakh-e jahan-ara (Persian: نسخ جهان‌آرا, romanized: The World-Adorning Texts), also known as the Tarikh-e jahan-ara, is a Persian universal history composed by the Safavid scribe and historian Ahmad Ghaffari Qazvini in 1563/64. It was dedicated to the Safavid shah Tahmasp I (r. 1524–1576).

The Nosakh-e jahan-ara was a prominent book, as indicated by numerous surviving copies. It was reported to have been translated into Ottoman Turkish. The work is structured, drawing inspiration from the Habib al-siyar, and instead of artistic or poetic details, it prioritizes military events.

== Sources ==
- Aldous, Gregory (2021). "The Qazvin Period and the Idea of the Safavids". In Melville, Charles (ed.). Safavid Persia in the Age of Empires, the Idea of Iran Vol. 10. Bloomsbury Publishing. pp. 29–46. ISBN 978-0755633777.
- Ghereghlou, Kioumars (2020). "Ḡaffāri Qazvini, Aḥmad". Encyclopaedia Iranica Online. Brill. doi:10.1163/2330-4804_EIRO_COM_11942.
- Quinn, Sholeh A. (2020). Persian Historiography Across Empires: The Ottomans, Safavids, and Mughals. Cambridge University Press. ISBN 978-1108842211.
- Trausch, Tilmann (2021). "Continuing a legacy in times of change". In Matthee, Rudi (ed.). The Safavid World. Routledge. pp. 182–200. ISBN 978-1138944060.
