= Ahsan al-tavarikh =

Book by Safavid historian Hasan Beg Rumlu

The Ahsan al-tavarikh (Persian: احسن‌التواریخ, romanized: The Most Beautiful of Histories) is a Persian universal history composed by the Safavid historian Hasan Beg Rumlu in 1578. Originally encompassing twelve volumes, only two have survived.

The chronicle provides a detailed historical account of a significant portion of the Persianate world. In contrast to other contemporary chronicles, it is notable for its detailed coverage of Safavid Iran's surrounding countries, particularly the Ottoman Empire and Khanate of Bukhara.

== Sources ==
- Aldous, Gregory (2021). "The Qazvin Period and the Idea of the Safavids". In Melville, Charles (ed.). Safavid Persia in the Age of Empires, the Idea of Iran Vol. 10. Bloomsbury Publishing. pp. 29–46. ISBN 978-0755633777.
- Nava'i, A. (2020). "Aḥsan al-tawārīḵ". Encyclopaedia Iranica Online. Brill. doi:10.1163/2330-4804_EIRO_COM_4963.
- Quinn, Sholeh A. (2020). Persian Historiography Across Empires: The Ottomans, Safavids, and Mughals. Cambridge University Press. ISBN 978-1108842211.
- Trausch, Tilmann (2021). "Continuing a legacy in times of change". In Matthee, Rudi (ed.). The Safavid World. Routledge. pp. 182–200. ISBN 978-1138944060.
