= İbrahim Peçevi =

Ottoman Bosnian historian-chronicler

- Ibrahim Alajbegović Pečevija
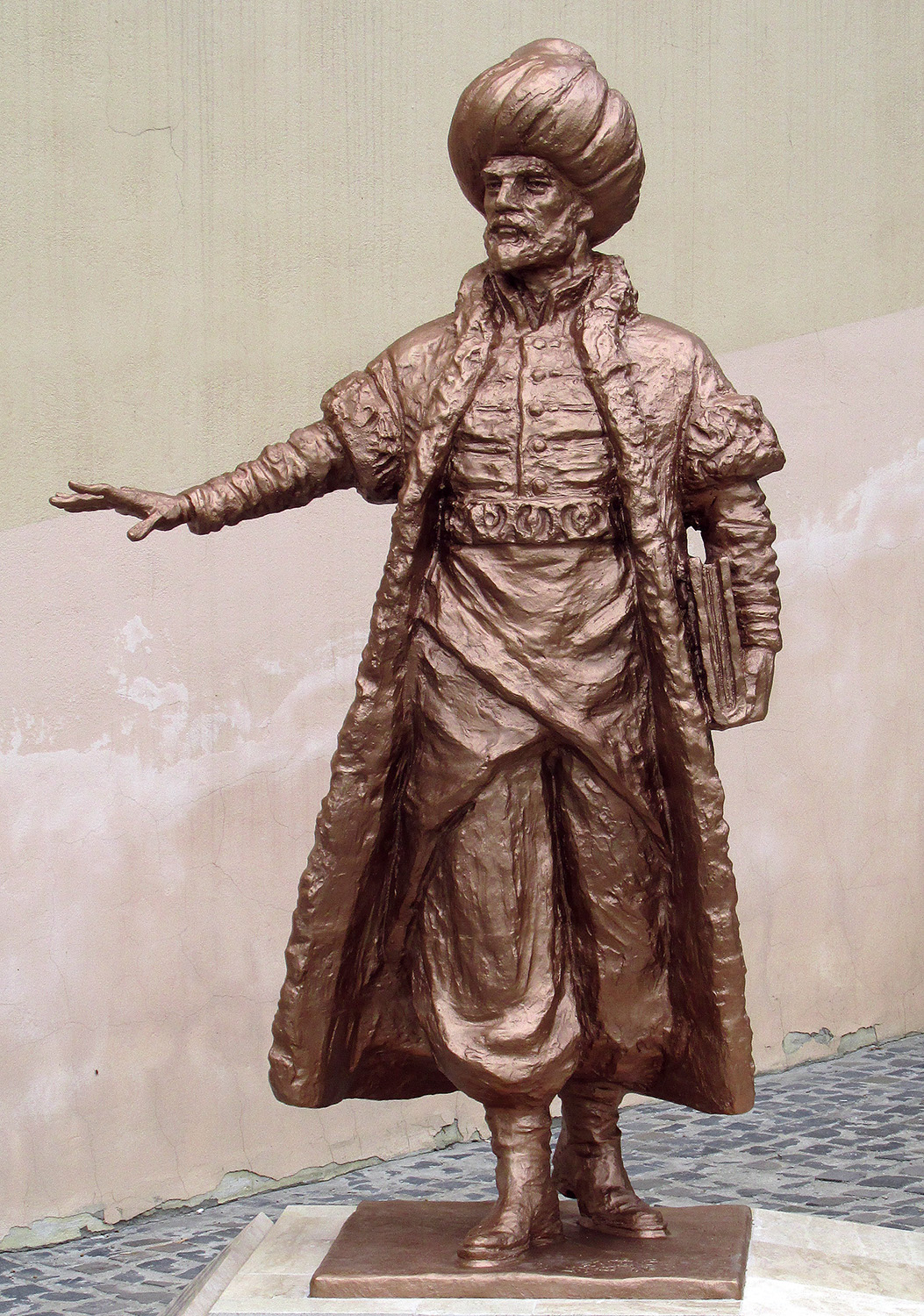
- Statue in Pécs
- Born: 1572; Peçuy, Ungurüs Serdarlik, Ottoman Empire (present-day Pécs, Hungary)
- Died: 1650 (aged 77–78); Buda, Ungurüs Serdarlik, Ottoman Empire (present-day Budapest, Hungary)
- Occupation: Historian

İbrahim Peçevi or Peçuyli İbrahim Efendi or (in Bosnian) Ibrahim Alajbegović Pečevija (1572–1650) (Ottoman Turkish: پچویلی ابراهیم افندى ) was an Ottoman Bosnian historian-chronicler of the Ottoman Empire.

== Life ==
He was born in Pécs (Peçuy), Ottoman Empire (today Hungary), hence his name, Peçevi ("from Pécs"). His mother was from the Sokolović Bosnian family. The name of his father is unknown. His paternal great-grandfather was a Turkish sipahi named Kara Davut Agha who was in the service of Mehmed II.

Peçevi was a provincial official in many places and became a historian after his retirement in 1641. He spoke Ottoman Turkish and his native Bosnian very well. The year of his death is not known. According to Katip Çelebi, he died in the Islamic year of 1061 (1650 AD). Some historians think he died before 1649.

== Works ==
Peçevi Effendi is famous for his two-volume book Tarih-i Peçevi ("Pecevi's History") of the history of the Ottoman Empire, the main reference for the period 1520–1640. The information about earlier events Peçevi took from previous works and narrations of veterans, while his own times are described firsthand and from tales of witnesses. Peçevi, careful to references all quotations, was also one of the first Ottoman historians who used European written sources; for example, he makes references to Hungarian historians. Parts of Peçevi's chronicles has been translated into Turkish, Bosnian, German, Hungarian, Georgian and Azerbaijani.
