= Michel Angelo Corai =

16th-century Syrian diplomat and spy

- Born: Fathullah Qurrai c. 1557; Manbij, Sanjak of Turcomans, Aleppo Eyalet, Ottoman Empire
- Disappeared: c. 1616; Goa, Portuguese India
- Known for: Safavid embassy to Europe; Revolt of Ali Janbulad
- Espionage activity
- Allegiance: Safavids; Grand Duchy of Tuscany
- Active: 1582 - 1616

Michel Angelo Corai (Note: Documents and secondary sources refer to him in different ways such as Angelo Corai, Angelo Corrai, Angelo Corray, Michelangelo Corrai, Michelangelo Coray, Michelangiolo Corai and Michel Angelo Giovanni Corai.) (born Fathullah Qurrai, c. 1557 — fl. 1582 – c. 1616) was a Syrian diplomat, translator and spy in service of Shah Abbas I and Ferdinando I de' Medici. He was instrumental in establishing Safavid embassy to Europe and rebellion of Ali Janbulad against Ottoman Empire.

== Background ==
Michel Angelo Corai was born as Fathullah Qurrai around 1557 in Ottoman Syria. His birthplace is disputed, it was either Aleppo or Damascus, however it seems that he was originally from Manbij and could have been a Turkmen. Although it was suggested that he was a Syrian Orthodox, he was probably a qurrāʾ, a professional reciter of Quran, hence his Muslim surname and later converted.

== Career ==
=== In Europe ===
He started his diplomatic career as a scribe to Cigalazade Yusuf Sinan Pasha when he was deployed to Syria, from whom he probably learnt Italian. He traveled to Iranian border frequently with his master, where he learnt Persian as well. He later left Cigalazade's service in 1582 and lived in Safavid Iran for a while, it was probably when he frequented Safavid court. He was married to a Christian woman in Aleppo and later converted for her. Facing persecution for leaving Islam, he later arrived in Mantua via Venice with Giovanni Battista Ruffini, a member of the Franciscan order and chief confessor of Vincenzo I Gonzaga in 1597. He assisted with translation of Ottoman documents in Battle of Raab on 28 March 1598. A week after the successful siege, Corai was officially recognized as a Knight of the Holy Roman Empire by Vincenzo on 3 April 1598.

He met Anthony Shirley in Venice shortly after being knighted. According to Corai's later report to the Venetian signoria, he had already befriended a merchant named Antonio Padovan in Aleppo in 1590 and he was staying at his house whenever he was in Venice. Anthony recruited by Corai to work for Shah Abbas, left Venice on 24 May 1598 for Alexandretta on a ship named Nana e Ruzzina. After arriving in Tripoli, Corai was arrested by the governor following slander from the Venetians. After paying a ransom, he was released, and the group traveled to Antioch in a small fishing boat. In Antioch, Corai, leveraging his extensive spy network, persuaded two Hungarian janissaries whom he personally knew to offer them shelter for the night. Subsequently, the travelers heading to Aleppo were received in Antioch by Richard Colthurst, the English consul of Levant Company. After spending five weeks trading there, they departed for Baghdad on September 2, 1598. Although they reached Baghdad on September 29, an order from Constantinople had been issued for their arrest and the confiscation of their property. On November 4, they were secretly transferred to Iran by a Florentine merchant named Victorio Speciero. Corai as their translator and guide left the group in Astarabad and headed for Qazvin to inform Safavid authorities. He later interpreted between Shah Abbas and Anthony Shirley on their way to Kashan.

Corai later left on 17 May 1599 via Tabriz-Erzurum-Trebizond route to Venice to wait for Asad bey Tabrizi, who was a secret diplomat of Safavids in merchant disguise. Asad bey was an experienced travel who earlier traded in Hormuz and Mughal India. Corai met Muhammadgulu bey Arabgirli-Shamlu in Constantinople and later arrived in Venice. He met the Signoria on 28 November 1599. He was described by Venetian secretary Piero Pellegrini as "a man of small stature, with black beard, of olive complexion, robed in a black camlet, of about forty years".

He visited Mantua and later Florence on 17 December 1599 to announce arrival of Safavid embassy to Ferdinando de’ Medici. Corai shared with the Duke the same story he told everyone else—that the Shah's wife was a Georgian Christian, the Shah himself wore a cross around his neck, and he commanded 50000 cavalry, 20000 riflemen, 100000 mounted archers, and numerous spearmen and was ready to ally with Medicis to invade Ottoman lands. Corai also noted on 20 December that Jelali revolts let by Karayazıcı and Huseyn Pasha have been consuming Ottomans. From this point, he was also enlisted in Medici service. He left Florence for Rome and delivered same announcement to Papal authorities. He met Antonio Fernández de Córdoba y Cardona (Spanish ambassador in Papal States) in late December 1600 and delivered letters by Anthony Shirley and Nicolas de Melo.

Asad bey on the other hand, arrived in Venice only in June 1600 and met Marino Grimani on 8 June. After their meeting, when Asad bey suggested to Corai that they travel to Rome together, Corai realized that Huseyn Ali Bey and Shirley had not yet arrived there. Concerned about this, he did everything in his power to prevent Asad bey from going to Rome. Corai feared that Asad might disclose diplomatic secrets to the Pope, especially since Asad had not been officially sent by the Shah as an ambassador. Aware that Venice did not wish to strain relations with the Ottomans, Corai went to the Venetian signoria. There, he met with the Doge and persuaded him to send the merchant back to Iran. He argued that Asad was an Iranian agent and that if he attempted to forge an alliance in Venice against the Ottomans, it could pose a danger to Venice. As a result, Asad bey was compelled to return to Shah Abbas as the Venetian ambassador and inform him that Shirley's embassy had not achieved his goal.

Corai caught up with Safavid embassy in March 1601 and was sent again to Venice as an envoy to announce their arrival. After waiting for three days in Verona for official permission from the Doge, the embassy received unexpected news: Venice was currently hosting an Ottoman ambassador, and the Safavid ambassadors would not be welcomed there. According to Oruj bey, this infuriated Huseyn Ali Bey, who perceived it as a personal insult. Corai followed the embassy and brought a letter from Shirley to Cinzio Aldobrandini in April. Corai stayed with the embassy in Rome through their mission. Shirley, having fallen out with Huseyn Ali bey in Rome, asked Clement VIII for a passport to return to Iran via Naples-Messina-Crete-Alexandretta-Tripoli-Damascus-Ormus route, financial means and diplomatic credentials for his interpreter, Corai. However, Shirley never returned to Iran while Corai left for Florence.

=== In Syria ===
Corai resurfaced in 1606, this time as a Medici envoy to Ali Janbulad. The mission was to remain secret, and the number of participants was to be kept to a minimum. He was carrying letters for Shah Abbas, Lebanese emir Fakhr al-Din, Joseph el-Ruzzi, as well as French consuls in Syria. Giovanni Altoni, a military engineer who led an earlier reconnaissance mission in Syria, criticized the Grand Duke for sending Corai as an ambassador, citing his Syrian origins and alleged loyalty to Venice. However, this criticism sometimes is also attributed to a French knight of Saint Stephen named Ippolito Lioncini, Corai's other companion. The envoys departed from Livorno arrived in Cyprus before continuing to Lebanon. Corai proved successful, treaty between Janbulad and Medici was agreed on 19 September 1607 and signed on 2 October. Leoncini left for Florence to present a copy to Grand Duke for him to ratify while Corai served the Pasha. However, the success for short-lived as Kuyucu Murad Pasha defeated Janbulad on 24 October. He was detained by Murad Pasha and interrogated. Vizier accused him of working for Janpulad and overseeing the defence of the castle. Corai, denying all allegations, attributed the accusations to the "envy and malignity" of his Jewish adversaries, whom he portrayed as the originators of the false charges. Instead of accepting Corai's defense, the vizier offered him commercial privileges for his family, followed by placing him in detention. There, Corai was interrogated about his arrival with two foreigners, one of whom had since departed while the other remained. In a mix of cipher and plain text in his report to Tuscan court, Corai recounted being taken to a house where four soldiers attempted to extract his secrets through torture. Corai claimed to have withstood the torment, and when the soldiers failed to obtain the desired information, they shifted their demands, asking for 500 piasters. Corai, claiming he lacked the funds, sought the assistance of a French merchant, Timoteo Moyen, whom he praised as an honorable and well-respected man. Moyen paid the ransom on Corai's behalf, marking the point at which Corai seems to have fully confided in him.

=== In Iran ===
Corai reported on 9 December 1607 that he was forced to flee to Safavid court and arrived in Qazvin via Hamadan on 19 March 1608. From there, after a few days' rest, he resumed his journey heading north, arriving on the 8 April in the province of Mazandaran, on the shores of the Caspian Sea, where Shah was holding court. After three days, the shah granted him an audience, during which he inquired about Corai's activities, the status of the task assigned to him eight years earlier, and the circumstances of his return to court.

Corai explained that, although he had been unable to deliver the shah's letters to all the intended rulers, he had met with Pope Clement VIII and the Grand Duke of Tuscany. He noted that the Duke had honored him with hospitality and trust, even appointing him as his ambassador to Syria. Corai then advocated for a Safavid military campaign in Syria, arguing that such a conquest would weaken the Ottoman Empire and significantly benefit Iran. An attack on Syria would have also served the interests of Ferdinand, an ally of the shah, who might have used the opportunity to occupy regional ports and further his ambitions in Cyprus. However, Shah appeared more focused on consolidating his earlier conquests rather than expanding westward beyond Baghdad. While some scholars, such as José Cutillas Ferrer, suggest that Abbas had broader Mediterranean ambitions, there is little documentation to support this, as the shah never extended his campaigns beyond Iraq.

Once in Isfahan, Corai met Shah on 8 April 1608 and was given the title bey by Shah Abbas, being ennobled as Fadli Bey. He continued corresponding with Europe from Iran. In one dispatch dated 28 June 1608 from Isfahan to Florence, he criticized Domenico Stropeni, a follower of Anthony Shirley of exeggarating role of Robert Shirley with misrepresenting him as a general of Shah Abbas in his book (published in 1605). Several of Corai's writings focus on the growing tensions between the Portuguese, particularly represented by the Augustinian religious order, and the shah, as well as the appearance of English ships in the waters of Hormuz, and, naturally, the shah's wars against the Ottomans, especially in the region of modern-day Iraq. According to Corai's letters, the shah was especially interested in whether the Catholic states were continuing their war against the Turks. Shah inquired on at least one occasion whether Michelangelo Corai had received any information regarding Anthony Shirley, the shah's ambassador who had left for Europe several years prior and had since ceased contact. Corai, lacking direct news, informed the shah that the last he had heard of Sherley was his reported journey to Barbary. However, through a French intermediary, Corai had learned some troubling details about Sherley's conduct. Reports indicated that Sherley had entered the service of the King of Spain, escaped from imprisonment, and had been banished from both England and Venice.

Corai's master Ferdinando de Medici died in February 1609, however notice of Ferdinand's death, sent on March 5—about a month after his passing—took roughly seven months to reach Isfahan. Corai led a funeral ceremony for Ferdinando in Isfahan's Christian quarter and even gave a speech praising him. Meanwhile, Corai continued to act as an interpreter for the Safavid court. Once in the summer of 1609, he interpreted for Carmelite brothers Redento da Cruz and Benigno di San Michele. He was later appointed by Shah Abbas as commissioner for all Safavid mines in the country, according to his secretary Giorgio Criger. Shah granted Michelangelo Corai all the wealth and properties of Dengiz Beg Rumlu, his ambassador to Spain, who had left for his mission in 1609 with Antonio de Gouvea. Upon Dengiz Beg's return to Persia in 1613, the shah had him executed after learning of his misconduct during his years of ambassadorship. Meanwhile, Corai was longing to return to Europe. However, Curzio Picchena, Secretary of State of Tuscany denied his request to be granted additional funds and called his travel to Iran unsanctioned in his letter dated 9 July 1612.

Following this communication, it remains uncertain whether Corai ever received the letter, but the correspondence between him and the Tuscan court ended permanently, and his situation took a dramatic turn. According to reports from the Discalced Carmelites, the shah, despite valuing Corai's services, demanded that he renounce his Catholic faith and convert to Islam. He used his position as mine commissioner as a means to orchestrate his escape. Before leaving Isfahan, he confessed and received communion at the Carmelite church. He left the city accompanied by a large group of slaves and servants, under the guise of fulfilling his mission for the shah. His departure was supported by the royal treasury and orders from the shah to governors to provide assistance. However, suspicions grew among his Muslim servants when they realized the route he was taking did not lead directly to the mines. They suspected that Corai intended to flee to Portuguese-controlled territories, considered Christian strongholds in the region. His attempt to complete the journey to Hormuz resulted in his arrest, but Corai, using his cunning, managed to escape by drugging his captors during a dinner party and fleeing, evading musket fire from Safavid border guards, he reached the fortress of Comorão (modern Bandar Abbas). From there, he secured passage to Ormus, where he was welcomed by local commanders. Despite his successful escape, Corai faced additional challenges upon arriving in Goa.

In 1614, after years of increasing tension with the Portuguese, Safavids captured Comorão, demanding the Portuguese governor to hand over Michelangelo Corai. Last letter addressed to Corai was written on 29 January 1616 by his former secretary Giorgio Criger, who by that time was working as an adviser for Ibrahim Adil Shah II.

== Sources ==
- Brege, Brian (2021-12-31). Tuscany in the Age of Empire. Harvard University Press. doi:10.4159/9780674258761. ISBN 978-0-674-25876-1.
- Ross, Edward Denison (2004). Sir Anthony Sherley and his Persian Adventure. Routledge. ISBN 9780203338223.
