= Hossein Ali Beg Bayat =

Safavid ambassador to Europe between 1599 and 1602

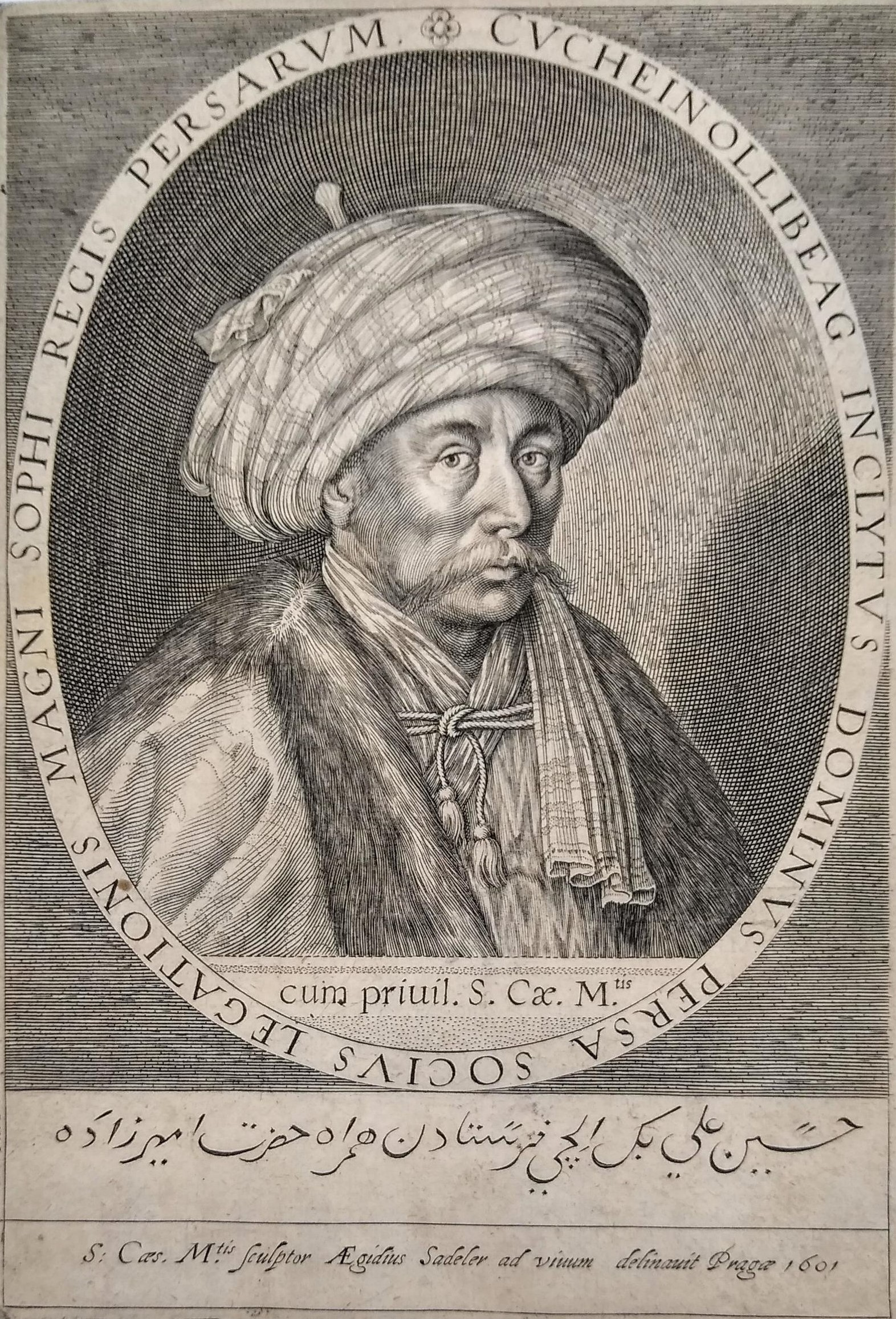
- The ambassador Hossein Ali Beg, in a portrait from life by Aegidius Sadeler in Prague, 1601

Safavid ambassador to Europe
- In office 1599–1602 Serving with Anthony Shirley
- Monarch: Abbas the Great
- Succeeded by: Pakize Imam Qoli Beg

Personal details
- Born: Sistan, Safavid Iran
- Occupation: Diplomat
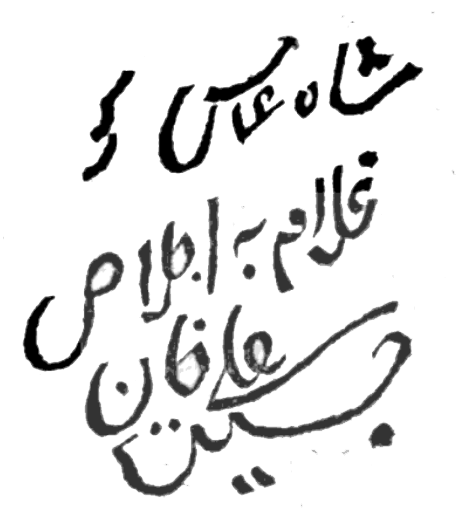
- Signature

Hossein Ali Beg Bayat (Persian: حسینعلی بیگ بیات, romanized: ḤoseynʿAlī Beyg-e Bayāt, fl. 1599 – 1606) was a Safavid diplomat who served as the ambassador to the Holy Roman Empire, the Russian Tsardom, Habsburg Spain and several other royal and noble courts during the reign of king Abbas I (r. 1588–1628), and was part of the first Safavid embassy to Europe.

== Career ==
He was a member of Turkoman Bayat clan and was born in Sistan province of Safavid Iran. Already an elderly man by the time he was appointed as an ambassador, he was described as a captain of 200-300 soldiers by Michel Angelo Corai and a close member of royal household. His nephew Ali Qoli beg was a friend of Oruj beg Bayat, both of whom would later join him in the diplomatic mission.

When king Abbas I decided to send Sir Anthony Shirley on an important diplomatic mission in Europe, in order to gain support and to form an alliance against the common cause, the Ottoman enemy, Anthony asked the king to send with him an Iranian of rank. Abbas chose a Qizilbash noble, Hossein Ali Beg, and, according to historian David Blow, he seems to have made him the official leader of the mission. However, this matter was apparently never made clear to Sir Anthony or he simply refused to accept it. This would be the reason for a constant unpleasant atmosphere that would sometimes culminate in bitter disputes between the two over precedence. Sir Robert Shirley, who was Abbas' initial choice instead of his brother Sir Anthony, stayed in Iran as a hostage.

== In Russia ==
Hossein Ali Beg and Shirley were accompanied by friars Alfonso Cordero, Nicolas de Melo, four secretaries, including Hossein Ali Beg's nephew Ali Qoli Beg, Oruj beg Bayat (later Don Juan), Bunyad bey, nineteen members of Sir Anthony's original suite.Hossein Ali Beg additionally took a number servants with him. It is indeterminate when the diplomatic entourage departed from Isfahan. Pietro Duodo, Venice’s ambassador to the Holy Roman Empire, indicated the date as 24 May, whilst Oruj bey Bayat proposed 9 July. Duodo's account provides the identical date as the credential letters from Shah Abbas received by Shirley in Gilan. Consequently, 24 May 1599 ought to be regarded as the date of the embassy's departure. Given that the embassy traversed the Isfahan-Dowlatabad-Kashan-Qom-Saveh-Qazvin route to reach Gilan, their departure from Isfahan probably occurred at the beginning of May. The remaining members of Shirley’s contingent—Anthony’s brother Robert, John Ward, John Perrot, and Gabriel Brooks, already mentioned—departed from Dowlatabad and resided at the palace of Shah Abbas.

Hossein Ali bey failed to intercept the caravan departing from Isfahan and only encountered Shirley in Gilan. The embassy stayed in Gilan until the conclusion of June because of adverse weather conditions. Oruj bey Bayat's papers indicate that the embassy encountered a storm on the Caspian Sea after departing from Rudsar and arrived at Astrakhan via Mankyshlak in mid-September. It thereafter encountered Pirgulu beg, who had been dispatched as an ambassador to Russia. After a 16-day stay in Astrakhan, they departed for Nizhny Novgorod on the Volga River on a five-oared boat. The embassy, en route to Moscow through Kazan, experienced a delay of seven weeks. The embassy of Hossein Ali bey was intended to proceed to Poland from this location. Tsar Boris Godunov seemingly prohibited their travel to Poland deliberately. Apparently Nicolas de Melo and Anthony Shirley started to have a dispute in Russia, Hossein Ali beg tried to mediate between the sides unsuccessfully. Melo was eventually arrested and exiled to Solovetsky Monastery in Northern Russia.

The embassy, having spent the winter months in Moscow, ultimately reached Arkhangelsk through Yaroslavl, Rybinsk, Totma, Turavets, and Kholmagory route. Following a 20-day sojourn, the embassy, having discovered a Flemish vessel, dispatched thirty-two boxes of gifts directly to Rome at Shirley's recommendation before to their departure. Nonetheless, these gifts did not arrive in Rome. Oruj Bey Bayat suggested that Shirley indeed sold these things to the captain. Shirley on the other hand, claimed that the presents were unworthy of European rulers because to their inferior quality, prompting him to return them to Iran.

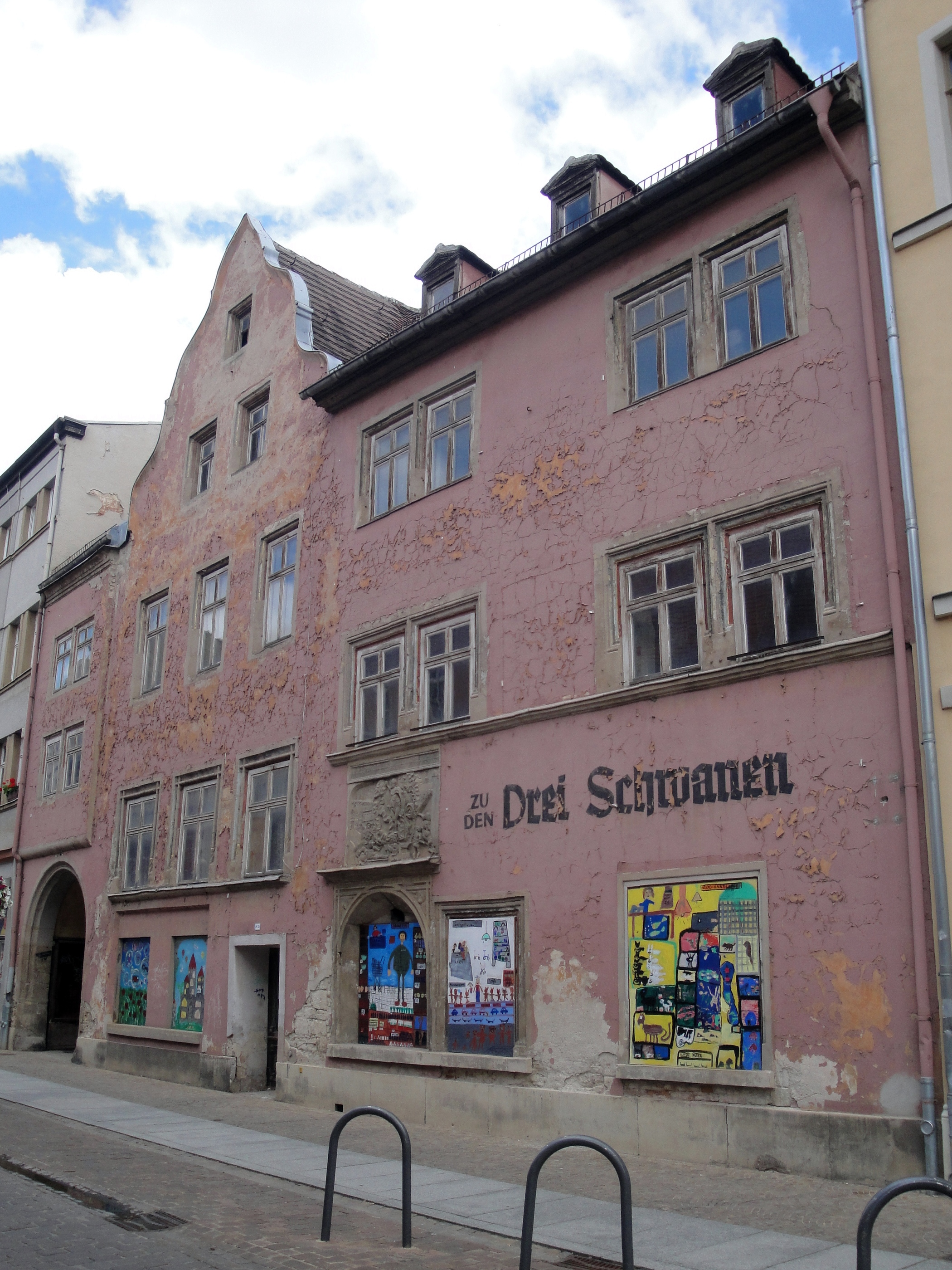
Guesthouse "Zu den Drei Schwanen" in Naumburg, where Hossein Ali beg lodged (2012)

== In Holy Roman Empire ==
The embassy traveled from Arkhangelsk down the Norwegian coast to Stade, a Hanseatic city located at the Elbe River's mouth. The embassy departed for Emden in August. The mission was met by Count Enno III of East Frisia. Despite Enno's oversight in notifying the emperor on the embassy, Hossein Ali bey dispatched a messenger. The embassy members, who arrived in Oldenburg via the Aurich-Friedeburg-Neuenburg route, encountered John VII, Count of Oldenburg there. They landed in Kassel from Oldenburg on 14 September and met Maurice, Landgrave of Hesse-Kassel according to court historian Wilhelm Dilich. Maurice dispatched a three-horse carriage to greet them at the palace. The diplomats were hosted by the landgrave for ten days; Maurice showcased the chambers of his palace, provided a private tour of the alabaster room, the cabinet of valuable stones adorned with coral walls, the armory, the stables, and exhibited the city’s new cannons. At the formal dining table in the hall, he presented them with fruit, forks, and marzipan shaped as "salt." The embassy members initially failed to comprehend the flavor and laughed. Maurice staged a jousting event in which his son participated prominently. They stayed in Kassel for 8 days and later proceeded eastward through Weimar-Alsfeld, and arrived at Rothenburg an der Fulda on 30 September, traversing Schmalkalden, Gotha, and Erfurt, before continuing to Naumburg the following day. His entrance to Naumburg on was witnessed by Johannes Burger, deacon at St. Wenzel's Church who described the event in his Annalium Naumburgensium. After staying in the famous inn called "Zu den drei Schwanen" (currently, in Jakobsstraße quarter of Naumburg) overnight.

Huseyn Ali bey attempted to confer with Elector Christian II of Saxony in Leipzig; however, the duke disregarded the meeting, prompting the ambassadors to depart for Prague. Hossein Ali beg passed through rest of Saxony and stopped in Louny for lunch. The embassy left in the evening and rested for 3 days at Modletický House in Slaný. The ambassadors departed from Slaný on 10 October and reached the Stella Pavilion (modern Letohrádek Hvězda) in western Prague. The Holy Roman Emperor Rudolf II organized an elaborate welcome for the ambassadors with a parade of 300 horsemen. In Prague, they lodged at "Mad Man" (Czech: U Divého muže) hotel, owned by the Přehořovský family, situated on modern Karmelitská street. Oruj Bey referred to this Renaissance-style hotel as "a palace." The embassy resided there for one week. During that week, Hossein Ali bey convened with the ambassadors of several nations. Subsequently, Huseyn Ali bey visited Prague Castle multiple times upon special invitation, with the emperor's attendants arranging a customary tour for esteemed guests. The embassy representatives toured the armory, the museum of curiosities including diverse animals and natural artifacts, the imperial wardrobe, the stables, and the lions' den.

The embassy of Hossein Ali bey was prepared to depart from Prague on 17 November. The emperor counseled the diplomat to return to Iran. The emperor could also convey the Shah's letters through his messengers as per his recommendation - a suggestion that Hossein Ali bey declined. Hossein Ali, who had remained in Prague for three days, sought the emperor's assurance for the partnership. Another stipulation of the embassy was more stringent: should war ensue, the emperor could not negotiate peace without the shah's awareness. Hossein Ali bey remained in Prague on 18 December. The Habsburg court attempted to convey to him that when the emperor desired peace, he could not promptly dispatch a courier to the shah - due to the potential for a letter to take months to arrive in Iran. The Germans anticipated a dragoman to interpret the correspondence. Dr. Bartholomew Petzen's sluggishness as an interpreter allegedly exasperated Rudolf II.

Prior to their departure, Rudolf II commissioned the renowned Flemish engraver Aegidius Sadeler to create a portrait of both ambassadors. The emperor's horse-drawn carriages from Prague were escorted by Rudolph's retinue to the town of Beroun, some 25 kilometers distant. The embassy finally departed 5 February. According to Franz Babinger, they entered Bavaria via the Rokycany, Plzen, Kladruby, Přimda route. Following the alternative southern route to the Golden Route (German: Goldene Straße) - the traditional route of the Holy Roman Emperors to travel from Prague to Nuremberg - they passed through Waidhaus, Vohenstrauss, Hirschau and Hahnbach and stopped in the city of Sulzbach to spend the night. According to Oruj Bey, the embassy was hosted well by Otto Henry, Count Palatine of Sulzbach.

The next morning, the embassy left for the city of Herzburg and entered Nuremberg, passing through the city of Lauf an der Pegnitz. The embassy entered Nuremberg on 12 February according to Oruj Bey (although, a local chronicler mentioned Candlemas - 2 February 1601). They were lodged at an inn called Bitterholtz (destroyed after bombardment of the city in 1945) for three days and were taken to the armory and to the grain storage facility there. After leaving the city, they continued along Via Imperii to reach Augsburg where they stayed for 6 days. Hossein Ali bey was later received by Maximilian I, Elector of Bavaria in Munich and was hosted for three days. Continuing the route, Hossein Ali finally reached Mantua and was hosted by Vincenzo I Gonzaga where they were joined by Safavid spy Michel Angelo Corai. Hossein, planning to visit Venice, sent Corai ahead to notify Signoria. The embassy, having awaited official authorization from the Doge for three days in Verona, got unforeseen information: Venice was presently accommodating an Ottoman envoy, rendering the Safavid ambassadors unwelcome. According to, Oruj bey this incited Huseyn Ali bey’s fury, perceiving it as an affront.

== In Italy ==
=== Tuscany ===
On 16 March 1601, the diplomats landed in Florence, the capital of the Grand Duchy of Tuscany. Ennea Vaini of Imola, the Medici's butler, received them in the village of Scarperia. As Shirley traversed the village of Pratolino, he galloped his horse, aiming to reach Florence before Hossein Ali bey, which aroused Ennea Vaini's suspicion that Shirley might not be the primary ambassador. The embassy spent the night at the Pitti Palace. Vaini selected accommodations for Shirley and Hossein Ali directly across from each other. Hossein Ali bey and his entourage used four rooms adjacent to the guest hall, while Shirley and his followers resided in four rooms adjacent to the ducal chapel. On 19 March, the ambassadors departed with Vaini and reached Pisa, where the grand duke was residing. Grand Duke Ferdinando was to meet the diplomats along the Arno River at the Medici Palace, currently known as the National Museum of the Royal Palace. The initial individual to welcome the ambassadors at the palace was Giovanni de’ Medici, the duke's illegitimate brother. Upon the embassy's arrival at the palace late in the evening, Giovanni escorted them to their accommodations on the side of the palace adjacent to the church of San Nicola. The rivalry between Shirley and Hossein Ali Bey manifested in Tuscany as well. Shirley saw the duke individually and presented him with a letter claiming to be from Shah Abbas. Oruj Bey provides no information regarding this letter, which is entirely composed in Italian and preserved in the Florentine archives. Hossein Ali Bey indicated that Shah Abbas did not compose a specific letter for Ferdinando.

Oruj bey’s account indicate that the embassy resided in Pisa for 10 days, although official Tuscan documents reveal that their visit lasted slightly over a week. The duke escorted them to the city of Livorno, where he exhibited the recently constructed defenses and port, which astounded the Safavid envoy. On 28 March, the embassy returned to Florence with the grand duke and was preparing to depart for Rome. En route (either in Siena or Viterbo, Hossein Ali accused Shirley of stealing Shah's gifts to European monarchs in Arkhangelsk. Embassy arrived in Viterbo by 2 April was received by a cardinal who reconciled them.

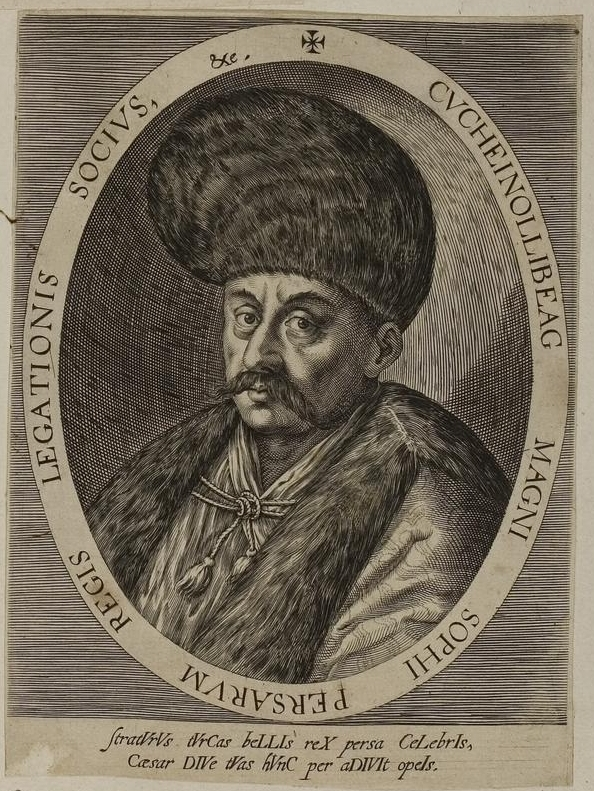
Another engravement of Hossain Ali Beg, 17th century

=== In Rome ===
The embassy arrived in Rome on 5 April. Given that the head of the mission - Hossein Ali bey was a Muslim, the College of Cardinals deemed it suitable for the embassy to be received by secular nobility instead of clergy. Nonetheless, the individual who encountered them was not a typical nobleman, but rather the Pope's 14-year-old nephew, Silvestre Aldobrandini. Upon entering the city, the disputatious ambassadors were unable to determine the proper placement of their horses. Consequently, in the evening, Shirley positioned herself in the center, Hossein Ali on the right, and Aldobrandini on the left. Antonio Fernández de Córdoba y Cardona's report indicates that this solution was attained by recalling that passing on the right side is a gesture of respect in Safavid Iran. The embassy traversed the Via Flaminia and approached Rome near the vineyards owned by the Count of Riano, situated a short distance from Porta del Popolo. As the embassy proceeded along the road, it passed before the Fountain of Julius III, accompanied by the Pope’s Swiss Guards and mounted soldiers. Upon entering the city via Porta del Popolo, the ambassadors proceeded along Via del Corso. Turning right in front of St. Mark’s Church, the embassy passed by the church of St. Andrea della Valle, which had been under construction for a significant duration, and Piazza Navona, and proceeded along the street of the same name where the Pasquino statue was located. Ascending the Mount Jordan, the embassy traveled from the Passage of Banks to Via Borgo Nuovo. A cannon was fired in their honor as they passed by Castel Sant’Angelo. Ambassadors arrived on two white horses, accompanied by lightly armored horsemen clad in tunics and mantles, devoid of spears. Roman nobles and heads of families, along with drummers, barons, and trumpeters, made their entrance into the central area of the Vatican. Papal master of ceremonies, Paolo Mucante’s writings describe a scene where the streets were bustling with individuals of all ages, eager to observe the oddly attired visitors from abroad. Nevertheless, they expressed dissatisfaction regarding the embassy's visit occurring at night, which hindered their ability to see them clearly. Oruj bey Bayat notes in his memoirs that “countless people came to see” them.

The ambassadors were received by the Patriarch of Jerusalem, Fabio Fiondi da Montalto, at evening at the Palazzo della Rovere. Mucante documented in his diary that Hossein Ali was the first to dismount and ascend the stairs when Shirley observed this and quickly stepped in front of him. This concerned Hossein Ali, and he expressed his grievances regarding Shirley, getting into a physical brawl. Shirley was dissatisfied with his circumstances and believed that a superior apartment had been allocated to Hossein Ali bey. It is reported that Shirley declined to partake in dinner that evening as a form of protest. However, ultimately, Cardinal Cinzio Aldobrandini succeeded in arranging a dinner for Shirley and Hossein Ali together. According to Alaleone’s writings, Shirley consumed fish, and Hossein Ali “devoured” meat.

Hossein Ali met Venetian ambassador Giovanni Mocenigo's secretary in Rome on 14 April, explaining his problem with Shirley, denouncing him and warning him about Henry Wotton, Shirley's friend in Venice. According to Spanish ambassador, whole Rome was divided into two factions, some siding with him and others with Shirley. Hossein Ali also appealed to Pope Clement VIII to accept him as official ambassador. His appeal was translated by Leonardo Abela, Michel Angelo Corai, Tommaso d’Angelo - an Armenian translator working in Rome. One of the factors that increased the credibility of Hossein Ali’s claim of being the ambassador was his note about Nicolas de Melo’s imprisonment in Russia at Shirley’s behest. Finally, Hossein Ali was received by the Pope on 26 April 1601.

==== Meeting with Clement VIII ====
According to officials in charge of Papal ceremonies - Paolo Alaleone and Giovanni Paolo Mucante - Hossein Ali bey kissed the pope’s feet while they were covered by his robe to avoid making contact with the cross motif on the pope’s shoes. He arrived accompanied by 12 individuals. From the Roman perspective, the meeting included not only the cardinals but also the counts of Riano, Peretti, and Malatesta. When Hossein Ali spoke, he articulated his thoughts in his own language, and according to Mucante, he expressed “things that no one understood.” The pope expressed his satisfaction with the friendship of Shah Abbas, noting that a genuine alliance would be established should he convert to Christianity. Hossein Ali bey replied that it was impossible to know God’s work, and that there was a possibility that Shah Abbas and even Hossein Ali bey himself could become a Christian someday.

Realizing that the meeting with Hossein Ali bey was more lavish and that there were also nobles in addition to the cardinals, the Venetian ambassador Mocenigo wrote in his report on 28 April that the pope accepted Hossein Ali bey as the real ambassador. The second official meeting of the ambassadors with the pope occurred at the Quirinal Palace on 2 May. This time, the initial reception took place with Hossein Ali in the morning, followed by a second reception with Shirley in the afternoon. The discussions encompassed the potential for a political alliance opposing the Ottomans, the circumstances surrounding Christians in Iran, and the prospect of Shah Abbas converting to Christianity. Hossein Ali enumerated the items that Shirley appropriated from him. As the result, Shirley left the entourage for Ancona and went to hiding in Venice.

According to Arnaud d'Ossat, Fabio Biondi came to see Hossein Ali on 2 June 1601, and informed him that the Pope had advised the latter to travel to Spain by land instead of by sea. Given that the course of this journey would partially traverse France, the pope requested that the cardinal engage in mediation with France to secure passports and necessary documentation for the ambassadors. The cardinal communicated with Charles de Lorraine, the governor of Provence, and Anne de Lévis, the governor of Languedoc, to inform them that he would relay the news regarding the arrival of the ambassadors. He additionally transmitted the requested documents to the Vatican on the same day. Spanish passport was received on 4 June. Lorenzo Suárez (viceroy of Catalonia), Beltrán de Cueva (viceroy of Aragon) and Pedro Franqueza were given letters of recommendations as well. By 9 June, Hossein Ali bey met the Pope for the last time and left Rome.

Cardinal d’Ossat’s report indicates that the embassy received a message at the Ponte Milvio as it departed from the city. Based on a correspondence from the Pope to Shah Abbas preserved in the Vatican archives, it can be concluded that this event occurred on 6 June. In the letter dated that time, it is evident that the servants of Hossein Ali bey - named Shahhossein, Rza, and Ali - chose to remain and embraced Christianity, a decision made of their own volition. Ultimately, this correspondence was composed to alleviate any concerns Shah Abbas might have regarding the absence of three individuals from the embassy. The letter additionally characterized this event as a positive development that would enhance relations between the Vatican and the Safavid state.

=== Genoa, Savona and Avignon ===
The embassy left Rome and followed the road Via Aurelia to Genoa. Oruj bey Bayat stated that the embassy remained in Genoa for one week and received favorable treatment from the republic’s administration. However, Jorge de Mendoza, the Spanish envoy to Genoa, reported that Hossein Ali bey was met with a lack of warmth by the Genoan signoria, leading to the ambassador's displeasure and early departure. Although Hossein Ali bey informed Mendoza of his intention to travel to Antibes or Fréjus by sea, followed by a land journey to Avignon, it appears that he later reconsidered this plan. Oruj bey Bayat noted that the embassy traveled solely by sea from Genoa to Savona over the course of two days. The documentation provided by Savona historian Giovanni Vincentzo Verzellino (1562-1638) further supports the narrative presented by Oruj bey Bayat. Verzellino wrote in his chronicle that on 27 June 1601, Hossein Ali bey had dinner at an inn called “Del Capello sulla calada” and ate it sitting on the carpet.

Hossein Ali bey's entourage followed Via Julia Augusta from Savona, touring French Riviera and turned north from Arles and went to Avignon through Via Alta road. There, Hossein Ali bey then met with the papal legate in Avignon and changed horses and mules. Leaving Avignon, embassy followed Via Domitia and arrived in Perpignan.

== In Iberia ==
=== Spain ===
Hossein Ali bey’s entry into Barcelona on 15 July 1601 was documented comprehensively in the city chronicle. According to the chronicle, Hossein Ali bey rode a horse sent by the viceroy, wearing a crimson velvet coat lined with matras and carrying a scepter about a palm and a half long. The ambassador remained in Barcelona for ten days before departing for Zaragoza. The embassy traversed the foothills of Montserrat and visited the monastery of Santa Maria before entering Aragon. Hossein Ali bey and Oruj bey were received by the viceroy of Aragon, who provided them with six carts. They entered the viceroy's palace and remained there for two days, surrounded by the amazed gazes of hundreds of inhabitants. Oruj Bey specifically expresses his astonishment at the Nuestra Señora del Pilar Basilica in the city. The embassy coming from Aragon to the village of Olivares de Duero was required to halt in Tudela de Duero, about 15 kilometers from Valladolid. Hossein Ali bey dispatched Oruj bey Bayat and canon Francesco Vasco - who was guiding them since Rome - to the palace. The representatives were received by the king's steward, Gomez Davila. Oruj Bey was greatly impressed by this meeting. Upon returning to Tudela, Oruj bey communicated the steward's message to Huseyn Ali bey: the palace mandated their presence for a minimum of eight days.

The palace delayed their proceedings due to the tardy arrival of the Duke of Sessa's report from Rome on 8 June. The royal government commenced deliberations regarding the arrival of the Safavid ambassadors on 17 July, while the ambassadors were in Barcelona. The cabinet thoroughly reviewed the documents received from Rome, and recommended to King Philip III the initiation of communication with the Safavid state via Portuguese India. As noted by the Spanish court historian Luiz Cabrera de Córdoba, the embassy conducted its ceremonial entry into the city on 13 August 1601. Hossein Ali bey was welcomed by Don Luis Enriquez, the steward of the King. Don Luis later escorted him to the palace to meet the king. The Vatican’s nuncio to Spain, Domenico Ginnasi, documented in his report that the king removed his cap as a gesture of respect upon receiving Shah Abbas’ letter. Oruj bey observed that this letter was composed on golden paper measuring over a meter in length and three fingers in width. Interestingly, Hossein Ali bey praised Cardinal Cinzio Aldobrandini and claimed that he had “sworn an oath of brotherhood” with him. The ambassador commended the 21-year-old Cardinal Giovan Battista Detti and highlighted his disapproval of Pietro Aldobrandini due to the latter's preference for Shirley. After the meeting, Don Luis returned with Hossein Ali to meet the Nuncio and the Venetian ambassador at the celebration for the wedding of the Sancho de la Cerda and Doña María de Villena. Upon inquiring about his opinion of the party, Hossein Ali stated that it was enjoyable; however, he expressed discontent regarding Margaret of Austria's dancing, considering her condition as she was expecting the first heir to the throne. During one day of that week, Hossein Ali bey also watched a Spanish-style bullfighting event.

Hossein Ali bey was visited by Francisco de Sandoval y Rojas, King's favourite, 4 days after his arrival. The ambassador submitted a memorial to King in following days. King's Council met on 30 August to discuss the memorial where Hossein Ali stated that he had been waiting for a reply from the King of Spain to take to Shah Abbas and that the captain in Hormuz was to give free passage to the Safavid merchants. He also mentioned an issue regarding pieces of iron brought by Portuguese merchants to the markets of Hormuz. According to Huseyn Ali’s memorial, these pieces, which were used to make swords, were too short, and the necessary industry to lengthen them was not available in his country, so he requested that the pieces be lengthened by four fingers. Additionally, the ambassador indicated that his financial resources had already run out and that he desired to return to his country soon. After much deliberation, the royal council advised Philip III to adopt a warm attitude towards Shah Abbas. They suggested that, given the Safavid queen was a Christian, the ambassadors should be religious individuals. The council also recommended that the Catalan canon Vasco prevent Huseyn Ali bey from traveling to France and Venice, instead accompanying him to Portugal. They emphasized that the King should allocate more funds than the Holy Roman Emperor and the Pope to display his wealth, proposing a grant of 10,000 ducats to Huseyn Ali bey, with 2,000 ducats to be paid on the way to Lisbon and the remaining 8,000 for the rest of the journey. Additionally, they advised giving the ambassador a portrait of Philip III, a gold chain, a sword with a golden scabbard or a precious stone, and to secure a good ship in Lisbon.

The embassy stayed in Valladolid for 2 months. When the members of the Safavid embassy rode around the city as a leisure activity, they were widely discussed by the women around them. However, embassy soon realized that Hossein Ali's nephew Ali Qoli bey Bayat was missing. According to the report sent to the Vatican by canon Vasco, who brought the embassy to Spain, Ali Qoli was ill for 3–4 days. According to the canon, Hossein Ali was very displeased by the conversion of his nephew. The embassy finally left Valladolid on 9 October for Portugal with Diego de Urrea, the translator assigned to them, and first arrived in the city of Segovia. The embassy dedicated two days to exploring the city, during which they visited notable sites including the Sanctuary of the Virgin of La Fuencisla, the Alcazar of Segovia, the Roman aqueduct, and the Segovia Mint. On 16 October 1601, the embassy traveled to the settlement of Valsain. Upon arriving at El Escorial on 17 October, the embassy conducted a tour of the monastery. The Spanish court historian Fr. Jeronimo de Sepulveda noted that Hossein Ali bey visited the monastery and stayed there for two days, and was treated well by the monks. Sepulveda emphasized that Hossein Ali bey was witty and as proof cited when three Spanish women asked him, “Which one of us is the most beautiful?” the ambassador answered “decide among yourselves.” As noted by earlier observers, Sepulveda also considered the way Hossein Ali bey ate food as animal-like: Before leaving, Hossein Ali bey requested 13 original architectural plans published in 1599 by the architect Juan de Herrera and wanted to take them to Iran since he liked the Escorial Palace. Hossein Ali bey later went to the cities of El Pardo, Madrid, Aranjuez and Toledo, according to the writings of both Sepulveda and Oruj bey. Luiz Cabrera de Córdoba mentions that when Huseyn Ali bey was in Madrid, he visited 72-year-old Maria of Austria, the widow of Emperor Maximilian II.

Subsequent to their departure from Toledo, the embassy arrived in the cities of Trujillo and Merida, where they fell victim to a homicide. Hossein Ali bey rented a house for the night in Merida, and the embassy garnered significant interest from the city's population. The esteemed Sayyed Amir al-Faqih, the mullah of the embassy, was stabbed to death in this location. The perpetrator evaded capture due to the cover of night, rendering the corregidor of Merida unable to locate the individual responsible for the crime. Hossein Ali bey expressed his displeasure regarding the incident and contemplated a return to Valladolid. However, upon discovering that the king remained engaged in a hunting event, he resolved to dispatch an envoy to the palace upon his arrival in Lisbon. According to Oruj bey, the mullah was interred in accordance with Shia tradition, and the local residents who observed the funeral found amusement in this event. The embassy, en route to Portugal, reached the city of Badajoz, where they were received by the corregidor Don Juan de Avalos, who hosted an official banquet in their honor.

=== Portugal ===
Oruj bey fails to provide any details regarding the route from Badajoz to Aldea Gallega or the timing of the embassy's arrival in Lisbon. However, according to the information provided by Cristóvão de Moura, the embassy arrived in Lisbon on 8 November 1601. Hossein Ali bey sent Oruj bey next day to Valladolid to report on Amir's murder. According to de Moura, Hossein Ali bey indulged in drinking wine for several days, failing to discuss any politics. Reportedly, he event went as far as boasting with discussing secret state matters with nobles and showing them letters from the King Philip III. De Moura also grew weary when he saw that Hossein Ali was spending money to buy a large quantity of lances, swords, and arquebuses to bring back to Iran. Citing In Coena Domini, de Moura claimed that Papal bull prohibited the King of Spain to sell weapons to Muslims. Royal Council in Valladolid, however, allowed Hossein Ali bey to purchase weaponry to fight against Ottomans on December 1. Hossein Ali bey also asked about Oruj bey’s whereabouts in his letter to King Philip III on 24 December 1601. Losing a lot of his retinue, Hossein Ali also requested to buy five slaves from Álvaro de Bazán. This request was denied and authorities denied any knowledge about whereabouts of Oruj bey.

In reality, Oruj bey and Ali Qoli bey were baptized and became Christians on 14 January 1601 with their godfather as Philip III and godmother as Queen Margaret of Austria. Ali Qoli bey was Don Felipe and Oruj bey was to be known as Don Juan from now on. Don Juan received a new letter from the king for the Shah and left again with Francisco de San Juan, his new translator and an Ottoman renegade. Don Juan subsequently returned to Lisbon and encountered Hossein Ali bey for the final time. During the meeting, Don Juan informed Hossein Ali bey of his preference to return to the country by land instead of by sea, which likely raised concerns in the ambassador. Don Juan justified his decision by expressing his aversion to lengthy travels, noting that he could make his way back to Iran from Venice within a span of 3–4 months while posing as a Turkish merchant. The viceroy, during a meeting with Don Juan, counseled against his return to Iran. During the conversation, Don Juan heard that Hossein Ali bey and Hasan Ali bey, the fourth secretary of the embassy, were discussing the possibility of arresting him upon his return to Iran. Don Juan dispatched Francisco to notify the viceroy, which soon led to the ambassador's ire, and it was reported that he would face death unless Francisco intervened.

Don Juan later recounts in his memoirs that prior to his departure, Hossein Ali attempted to purchase a Turkish prisoner from the ships of De Bazán and sought to orchestrate an assassination. This information substantiates the legitimacy of official correspondence within the Spanish court. According to Don Juan, De Bazán was alerted to this plan, leading the admiral to arrive with 20 soldiers and subsequently apprehend that slave once more. Don Juan also convinced a third secretary - Bunyad bey, to stay in Spain. He also converted to Christianity and came to be known as Don Diego.

Hossein Ali bey finally left for Iran on 14 March 1602 aboard the galleon San Roque. King Philipp III learned about Hossein Ali bey’s departure only on 22 April 1602. Hossein Ali bey arrived in Goa and traveled to Isfahan via Hormuz Island. His arrival was reported to King of Spain on 29 June 1603. Hossein Ali bey later reported his account to the Shah and met Portuguese diplomat Antonio Gouvea in 1606. His subsequent fate is unknown.

== As a musician ==
Hossein Ali bey attended the baptism ceremony of Anne of Austria on 7 October 1601 at the San Pablo Cathedral in Valladolid. The ambassador was noted to be present in a gallery, situated in a corner of the main chapel, where he was observing the events unfolding; he appeared to be quite pleased with the proceedings. Girolamo da Sommaia (1573-1635), a Florentine researcher who resided in Spain during that period and pursued his studies at the University of Salamanca, documented that Hossein Ali bey performed a song during this ceremony. He refers to Hossein Ali bey’s song as "Song that the Ambassador of Persia made at the birth of the Princess" (Spanish: Canción que el Embaxador de Persia hizo al nacimiento de la Princesa). Francesco de Benedictis, who conducted an analysis of both songs, posits that the lyricist was, in fact, Oruj bey Bayat, an individual proficient in the Castilian language. Francesco ascribes this to the superior education that Oruj bey received in Iran. Luiz Gil Fernandez, however, claimed that it was overly simplistic to assume that Oruj bey could compose a sonnet or a rhyming poem in the Castilian language within a brief timeframe. Although the question of Oruj bey’s authorship is in doubt, Nicolas-Claude Fabri de Peiresc, a musical researcher of the time, testified to Hossein Ali bey’s music knowledge, claiming to have seen him playing a kind of guitar. The Spanish court historian Fr. Jeronimo de Sepulveda also noted that Hossein Ali bey was a musician. According to him, Hossein Ali bey asked for a lute at the end of the meal in El Escorial and played some tunes in tones very different from those used in Spain. Then he sang praises to the king, the monastery, and the hospitality shown to him.

== See also ==
- Mehdi Qoli Beg
- Habsburg-Persian alliance

== Sources ==
- Ansari, Ali M. (2013). Perceptions of Iran: History, Myths and Nationalism from Medieval Persia to the Islamic Republic. I.B.Tauris. ISBN 978-1848858305.
- Blow, David (2009). Shah Abbas: The Ruthless King Who Became an Iranian Legend. I.B.Tauris. ISBN 978-0857716767.
- Fisher, William Bayne (1986). The Cambridge History of Iran, Volume 6. Cambridge: Cambridge University Press. ISBN 978-0521200943.
- Bayat, Oruj bey (2013). Don Juan of Persia: A Shi'ah Catholic 1560-1604. Translated by Strange, G. Le. Routledge. ISBN 978-1-134-28459-7.
