= Diego de Urrea =

16th-century linguist, translator, and diplomat

- Born: Diego Conca c. 1559; Tropea, Kingdom of Naples
- Died: 1616 (aged 56–57); Spain
- Known for: Surrender of Larache to Spain

Academic work
- Notable students: Francisco de Gurmendi; Bartolomé Leonardo de Argensola; Lupercio Leonardo de Argensola

Diego de Urrea Conca (c. 1559 – 1616), also known as Morato or Morato Aga, was a 16th-century linguist, translator, and diplomat. He served as the official interpreter and translator of Arabic (both classical and vernacular), Turkish, Tatar (likely a variant of Turkish spoken by Crimean Tatars), and Persian languages for the Spanish Crown during the reigns of Philip II and Philip III.

== Early life and captivity ==
Diego de Urrea was born around 1559 in Tropea, in the region of Calabria, part of the Spanish-controlled Kingdom of Naples. His birth name was Diego Conca, son of Giovanni Ludovico Conca. He had an elder brother named César Conca (b. 1546) and a younger brother who was a cleric. His family had military connections, and some sources identify his uncle as the “Captain Moreto,” a soldier who served under the Duke of Alba during the Italian Wars.

At a very young age—either as a 14-month-old infant or a boy of five or six—Diego was captured by North African corsairs and taken to Tlemcen in Algeria. He was adopted by a Muslim family and received a thorough education in Islamic sciences at the city's madrasas alongside Muley Xeque. He mastered Arabic, Turkish, and Persian, and became proficient in Arabic grammar, philosophy, logic, and Islamic theology. He assumed the name Murad (Morato). Upon the death of his adoptive father, he became free and inherited his estate.

Due to his linguistic and administrative skills, Urrea was appointed secretary and functionary in several Ottoman provinces, including Algiers, Tripoli, Tunis, and Constantinople. He worked under prominent Ottoman officials, including the kapudan pasha Uluç Ali and Hasan Pasha (governor of Algiers from 1577 to 1580 and 1582–1588). By his own account, he had achieved "much revenue and command" in this position. As secretary to Uluç, he was sent to Morocco to analyze the possibility of a Turkish conquest of the kingdom of Fez, apparently after Abd al-Malik, who had fled from his brother, Abdallah al-Ghalib (1557–74), and had taken refuge in Constantinople, had informed the Turks of the possibilities that the region offered for galley production.

During his tenure, he amassed considerable wealth and influence, reportedly managing revenues of 25,000 to 30,000 escudos annually, and even wielded Hasan Pasha's seal.

== Return to Christianity ==
After thirteen years of service to the Ottomans, Urrea claimed to have experienced a religious awakening triggered by his mother's prayers. He fled Ottoman service and, according to one account, was captured when Hasan Pasha's ship wrecked near Pantelleria en route to Constantinople. Taken to Palermo in Sicily, he was received under the protection of the Viceroy Diego Enríquez de Guzmán. Urrea reconciled with the Catholic Church in 1589, with María de Urrea, wife of the Viceroy serving as his godmother. The Spanish Inquisition oversaw his formal reconciliation. He adopted the name Diego de Urrea, apparently drawing from his godmother's surname.

== Career ==
=== In Spain ===
Urrea's unique fluency in multiple Oriental languages and deep familiarity with Islamic cultures quickly earned him a position in the service of the Spanish Crown. In 1593, he was appointed to a newly established chair of Arabic at the University of Alcalá de Henares with a salary of 120 ducats, a position he held until 1597. He simultaneously served as royal interpreter of Eastern languages, with a salary and royal entertainment allowance. Among his students were Vicente Nogueira (1586–1654), the brothers Bartolomé and Lupercio Leonardo de Argensola, later prominent literary figures. He occasionally worked as an Arabic interpreter for the Inquisition Court in Cuenca. His service in the Inquisition Court was praised by Sebastián de Covarrubias, who regarded him as more academic. Having many positions in addition to being professor, his students complained about his frequent absences and being bad at teaching overall.

In August 1596, Urrea was called upon to assist in the controversial translation of Lead Books of Granada, texts of supposed Christian origin discovered in Arabic. His translations, which conflicted with the agendas of church authorities such as Archbishop Pedro de Castro, sparked tensions. Urrea later confessed to having modified translations under pressure to make them conform to Catholic orthodoxy.

During 1598, Urrea worked at El Escorial, cataloging Arabic manuscripts in the monastery library and teaching Arabic to monks. He also instructed private students interested in Arabic historical sources. During this period, he criticized contemporary historians, including Miguel de Luna, Jerónimo de Blancas, and Juan de Mariana, for their misrepresentation or ignorance of Arabic sources. Urrea himself began compiling a history of Muslims in Spain based on Arabic sources. Although the work was completed by 1596 and submitted to royal secretary Francisco de Idiáquez for publication, it was never printed and is now lost. He created a bilingual Arabic–Castilian catalogue and compiled a now-lost Arabic dictionary. He taught four friars and created study aids, including a vocabulary list and partial translations.

After the death of Philip II in 1598, Urrea's salary was suspended, prompting him to seek support from the royal council. Before his death, Philip II had ordered that he be assigned a house of lodging, but in May 1601 this had still not been done, with the excuse that it had to be ordered by the new monarch. Obliged to reside at court, he was living in an inn in Valladolid with all his household, at great expense. On 15 May, he requested a house of lodging, as other royal servants had, a request which the Council considered just and which the king ordered to be granted. Shortly thereafter, he requested that his salary of five hundred ducats annually be doubled, for two reasons: the high cost of living and his desire to assist his brother César Conca, who, with four daughters and three sons, was in great need in Naples. He also requested either financial aid or, failing that, permission to retire to Naples, where he could serve the viceroy in secret Levantine affairs. The Council proposed increasing his salary to eight hundred ducats and granting him an additional help of cost of one thousand, but was opposed to letting him leave, due to the usefulness of his services in the newly established correspondence with Shah Abbas. He accompanied Hossein Ali Beg Bayat's embassy through their journey in Spain and Portugal.

Urrea was increasingly employed in Spain's diplomatic and intelligence efforts concerning North Africa and the Ottoman world. He provided crucial information on Ottoman plans to conquer Fez and Morocco, drawing on earlier contacts in Barbary corsairs. His familiarity with Arabic-speaking elites and religious scholars made him an effective analyst of Islamic states' internal politics. From 1607, at Philip III's recommendation, Urrea entered service to Alonso de Guzmán y Sotomayor, 7th Duke of Medina Sidonia in Málaga, where he used his network of informants in Africa and Turkey for diplomatic purposes. Urrea's stay in Málaga was not prolonged. In January 1609 he was back at court. He continuously asked for a transfer to Naples. Urrea believed that his stay in Naples could be useful for the translation of letters intercepted from the Turks, but also for matters concerning Greece, especially if he were to embark on the galleys for some expedition.

However, civil war in Morocco halted this request. In 1609–1610, he was dispatched to work alongside Juanetín Mortara and Muley Xeque, a claimant to the Moroccan throne. Urrea's personal ties with Muley, whom he had known in Tlemcen, proved instrumental in concluding the surrender of Larache to Spain in 1610. He persuaded local population of the sin they would commit if the three sons of Muley Xeque — being descendants of the Prophet Muhammad — were to fall into Spanish captivity and be baptised. He convinced them of "the benefits of friendship with Philip III" and told them that "a sheikh named Ibrahim" had sold Larache to the Ottomans, which would have meant the total destruction of their kingdoms.

Shortly afterwards, Urrea was ordered to accompany Safavid ambassador Dengiz bey Rumlu to Rome alongside Oruj bey Bayat (now Don Juan of Persia). The journey, however, was cancelled at the last moment due to Dengiz beg's illness, and Urrea was left in a precarious situation, having sold everything he owned and being on the verge of eviction from his lodgings.

=== In Naples ===
Diego finally arrived in Naples in August 1612 thanks to influence of viceroy Pedro Fernández de Castro whose circle included de Argensola brothers - former students of Urrea. Once there, Urrea established contact with Cardinal Federico Borromeo earlier in 1611 through Francesco Piazza, whom the cardinal had sent to Naples with the task of searching for and purchasing rare books. Urrea conveys to Borromeo his interest in collaborating on the purchase and translation of Arabic books for the Ambrosian Library, especially Al-Qāmūs al-Muḥīṭ. These collaboration projects, however, did not move forward, and Urrea became involved in the cultural environment of Naples within the local section of the Accademia dei Lincei under patronage of Giovan Battista della Porta. Diego de Urrea joined the society on 27 January 1612 and was one of its four members, alongside Filesio Constanzo della Porta, Nicola Antonio Stigliola, and Fabio Colonna.

He was introduced to Galileo Galilei by Federico Cesi, describing Urrea as "a noble knight and of uncommon learning," since, "besides philosophy and a good understanding of other sciences, he fully commands the Arabic, Persian, and Turkish languages." Urrea's stay in Naples did not last long. As a result of a serious illness that struck him, the doctors advised him to return to Spain, "because the climate of Naples was so contrary to his constitution." Urrea requested leave to return, which Philip III granted in February 1616. Urrea returned to Spain seriously ill in the summer of 1616 and died shortly thereafter. A document dated October 22, 1616, shows his wife Maria signing as a widow in a petition for assistance.

== Works ==
- Arabic: معرفة الكتب العربية التي في خزانة سان لورندو السلطاني على ترتيب الحروف, romanized: Maʿrifat al-kutub al-ʿarabiyya allatī fī khizānat Sant Luʾrandu al-sulṭānī ʿalā tartīb al-ḥurūf, lit. 'Information about the Arabic books that are in the library of San Lorenzo el Real, in [Arabic] alphabetical order'
- Spanish: Thesauro Arábigo en Lengua Castellana, lit. 'Arabic thesaurus in the Castilian language'
