= Mehdi Qoli Beg =

- مهدیقلی بیگ
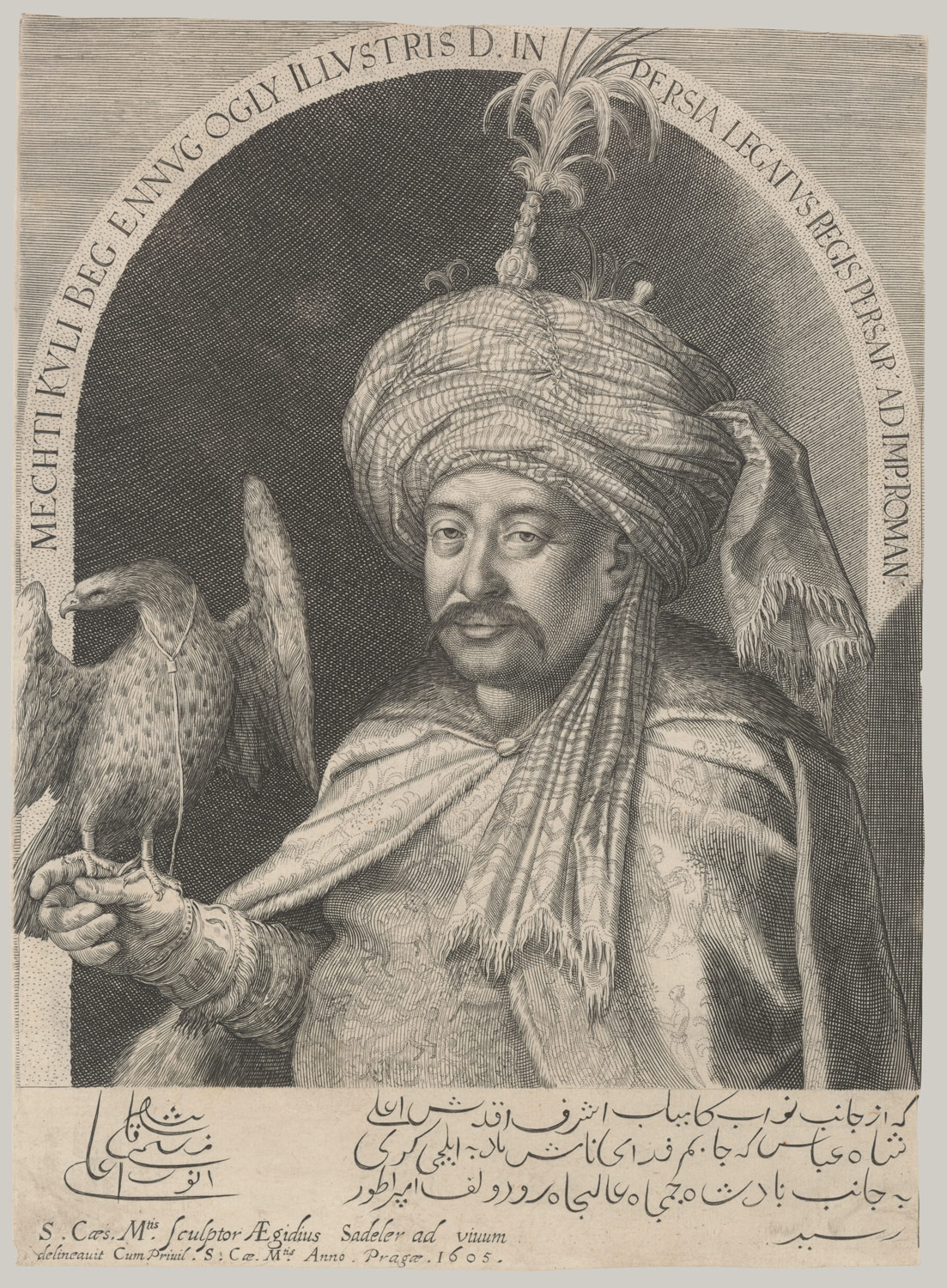
- Mehdi Qoli Beg's portrait, engraved by Aegidius Sadeler II in 1605

Special Ambassador of Safavid Persia to Tsardom of Russia
- Monarch: Abbas I of Persia

Special Ambassador of Safavid Persia to Holy Roman Empire
- Monarch: Abbas I of Persia

Personal details
- Occupation: Diplomat

Mehdi Qoli Beg (Persian: مهدی قلی بیگ; ? - July , 1618) was a Chagatai ruler in Khorasan and a courtier at the court of Shah Abbas I of Safavid dynasty. He was named Amir-e Akhour (person in charge of the royal stable,) and was sent on a diplomatic mission to Tsardom of Russia and Holy Roman Empire.

== Diplomatic Mission ==
In 1599 and on the advice of Anthony Sherley, Shah Abbas, hoping to secure a European alliance against Ottoman Empire dispatched an embassy to Europe. The mission met with the Holy Roman Emperor, Rudolf II, who in turn sent Etienne Kakach to Isfahan. Kakach died on the journey and his secretary, Georges von der Jabel took charge. Shah Abbas greeted von der Jabel, and sent him together with Mehdi Qoli Beg to Moscow to inform Tsar Boris Godunov of the recent Persian victory over the Ottoman Turks.

Tsar was pleased upon hearing the news, and sent 5000 men and a number of canons to help Shah Abbas in reconquering Derbent. Mehdi Qoli Beg and von der Jabel left for Holy Roman Empire, and arrived in Prague on January 8, 1605. Rudolf agreed to a triple alliance between Holy Roman Empire, Russia, and Persia against the Ottoman Turks, and assured Mehdi Qoli Beg that he will attack Ottoman Empire from the west.

== See also ==
- Hossein Ali Beg Bayat
- Habsburg-Persian alliance
