= Girolamo da Sommaia =

17th-century Italian jurist, diarist, bibliophile, and administrator

Mons. Girolamo da Sommaia

Provveditore of University of Pisa
- In office 1614–1635
- Appointed by: Cosimo II de' Medici

Personal details
- Born: Girolamo della Sommaia; June 17, 1573 Florence, Grand Duchy of Tuscany
- Died: 1635 (aged 61–62) Pisa, Grand Duchy of Tuscany
- Education: University of Salamanca

Girolamo da Sommaia (Florence, 17 June 1573 – Pisa, 1635) was an Italian jurist, diarist, bibliophile, and administrator. He is best known for his detailed diary chronicling his student years in Salamanca (1603–1607), which provides a rare portrait of intellectual and daily life in early 17th-century Spain.

== Biography ==
=== Early life ===
He was born on 17 June 1573 in Florence to noble family. His father Giovanni da Sommaia (appointed senator by Ferdinando I in 1588) belonged to a noble line of Lombard-origin feudal lords, while his mother Costanza Guicciardini and niece of the historian Francesco Guicciardini. He was named after his grandfather Girolamo da Sommaia who was made senator by Cosimo I in 1554. His family were hereditary owners of the fortress of Sommaria or Sommaia in the Val d’Arno near Florence. Girolamo's parents married in 1567.

Girolamo received a strict humanist education and entered minor clerical orders at a young age, though he would not become a priest until 1614. In 1599, at age 26, he received a rare licence to study abroad and departed for Spain to study civil and canon law at the University of Salamanca, assisted by his maternal uncle Francesco di Agnolo Guicciardini, then the Medici ambassador in Madrid since 1593.

=== Salamanca years (1599–1607) ===
Sommaia lived and studied in Salamanca from June 1599 to May 1607. His life there is documented in a unique diary written in a hybrid Italo-Spanish vernacular, preserved in manuscript form at the Biblioteca Nazionale in Florence. Initially a ledger of expenses, the diary evolved into a detailed personal account that offers insight into Golden Age of Salamanca. Edited and published by George Haley as Diario de un estudiante de Salamanca. La crónica inédita de Girolamo da Sommaia (1603–1607) (Salamanca, 1977; reprinted León, 1997), it is valued for its economic data—prices for books, clothing, theatre tickets, meals—and for its cultural and social observations.

The diary records encounters with local figures, including artisans, clergy, scholars, and prostitutes. It includes details as intimate as dream emissions and as mundane as sermon summaries. Sommaia also confessed his sensual excesses and reading of heterodox literature—naming Jean Bodin, Machiavelli, and Venetian writings in a 1606 entry. Sommaia frequently borrowed, transcribed, and annotated manuscripts, often with the help of servants and fellow students. He may have visited Valladolid in 1601 and attended the baptism ceremony of Anne of Austria on 7 October 1601 at the San Pablo Cathedral in Valladolid. He may have witnessed Safavid ambassador Hossein Ali bey Bayat performing a song during this ceremony. He refers to Hossein Ali bey’s song as "Song that the Ambassador of Persia made at the birth of the Princess" (Spanish: Canción que el Embaxador de Persia hizo al nacimiento de la Princesa), however he may have just invented the words as oriental exotica. He bought Don Juan of Persia's Relaciones on 14 November 1606.

A man of means, Sommaia rented a house and entertained friends, students, and scholars. He was closely connected with local intellectuals such as Ambrosio Alemán and Lorenzo Ramírez de Prado. The future jurist Juan Solórzano Pereira shared with him a draft of his De parricidiis in 1604. Sommaia was fluent in Spanish and French, studied English, and was passionate about theatre, literature, and card games. He frequented Salamanca’s libraries but also amassed a large private collection, particularly in law, classics, and travel literature. He frequented booksellers like Juan Comán and Guillaume Pesnot. He developed a rigorous practice of copying and compiling texts, creating anthologies of Golden Age Spanish poetry and prose, political treatises, proverbs, epigrams, and commentaries.

His reading included Góngora, Quevedo’s Sueños, Rojas’s La Celestina, Lope de Vega, and Cervantes’s Don Quixote in its unbound first edition. He also read political treatises such as Juan de Mariana’s De rege et regis institutione (On the king and the royal institution), Thomas More’s Utopia, and Antonio Pérez’s Relaciones, which he had copied clandestinely. He noted Inquisition actions, such as the 1606 order to confiscate volume IV of Francisco Suárez’s commentary on Aquinas.

Sommaia compiled two major manuscript anthologies of Spanish poetry: Var. poesie spagnuole copiate da Monsignor Girolamo da Sommaia (Fondo Magliabechiano, VII, 353), and Poesie spagnuole copiate da Arnaldo cameriere di Mons. Girolamo da Sommaia (VII, 354). These volumes include works by Diego de Mendoza, fray Melchor de la Serna, and fray Luis de León, and are considered important sources for the study of Siglo de Oro poetry.

=== Return to Italy and later life ===
Sommaia returned to Florence in July 1607, carrying his diary, poetry collections, and numerous codices. He began practising law, often handling matters for his family, and took on civic roles such as inspector of the Policlinico San Matteo and member of the Council of Two Hundred. In 1610, he joined the Company of Good Men of the Prisons (Italian: Compagnia de’ Buonuomini delle Carceri).

In 1611, he relocated to Rome and backed by his family’s wealth, he purchased the office of Abbreviator de Parco Maiori previously on 12 December 1611, from the Dataria of the Apostolic Chancery. However, he soon returned to Florence, disillusioned by Vatican politics. His religious vocation was rekindled, and in a papal bull dated 20 October 1614, Pope Paul V granted him "the faculty to be ordained a priest in three Sundays of his choosing.” What the bull authorised was his advancement through the major orders—subdeacon, deacon, and priest —in three weeks instead of the usual three years coinciding with his appointment as prior of Santo Stefano dei Cavalieri, Pisa. That same year, he was knighted in the Order of Saint Stephen and named Provveditore of the University of Pisa. This role, which included administrative and disciplinary authority over faculty, students, and publications, made him the Grand Duke’s direct representative in university affairs.

=== Relationship with Galileo ===
His preserved annual reports provide detailed assessments of faculty, including his correspondence with Galileo Galilei, then chief mathematician and court philosopher. As Provveditore, Da Sommaia was responsible for disbursing Galileo’s stipend, which enabled the scientist to continue his investigations, yielding further major discoveries—and no small number of controversies and setbacks. Although Da Sommaia and Galileo met in person when the former visited Florence, most of their communication occurred through letters. Benedetto Castelli, Galileo’s disciple and deputy at the university, often acted as intermediary between them. He also sponsored baptism of his illegtimate son Vincenzo Gamba in 1606. By early May 1615, the accusations against Galileo had reached the University of Pisa. Da Sommaia received instructions from the Florentine ministers to withhold part of Galileo’s semester salary unless the scientist provided the guarantees they demanded. Unlike his colleagues, Sommaia remained a supporter of Galileo. A few months after that, Galileo travelled to Rome to defend himself against his accusers and to attempt to prevent the inevitable prohibition of Copernican heliocentrism by the Inquisition.

=== Last years ===
In 1626, he edited and annotated a new manuscript edition of History of the families and nobility of Florence (Italian: Istoria delle famiglie e della nobiltà di Firenze) by Piero Monaldi. He died in Pisa in 1635, aged 62.

== Collection and legacy ==
Sommaia's passion for texts continued throughout his life. His library grew to nearly 1,000 items, including 709 printed books and 176 pencilled manuscripts. The posthumous Inventario of 1637 catalogues texts in Spanish, Italian, Latin, and other languages across legal, literary, political, and theological genres. His collections were partially dispersed but later consolidated by Antonio Magliabechi and Anton Francesco Marmi. Today, they are primarily housed in the Biblioteca Nazionale Centrale di Firenze (Magliabechiano and Principale series) and the Biblioteca Riccardiana. His miscellanies offer crucial insights into manuscript culture, book circulation, and early modern collecting practices.

According to Paola Volpini, Sommaia's work exemplifies the sociability of books in the early modern world—a networked model of knowledge acquisition through borrowing, copying, annotating, and gifting. His collections include rare witnessings of early circulation of texts by Quevedo, Lope de Vega, Justus Lipsius, and others. His diary reveals a material history of reading and writing practices, demonstrating how scholarly communities formed around shared texts long before formal libraries. Despite lacking the numerical scale of elite libraries like those of Gian Vincenzo Pinelli or Cassiano dal Pozzo, Sommaia's corpus holds unique historical and literary significance due to its thematic breadth, transnational provenance, and extensive documentation in his own hand.
