= Juan Boldames Ibáñez =

17th-century Catholic bishop

Most Reverend Juan Tadeo de San Eliseo
- Bishop of Ispahan
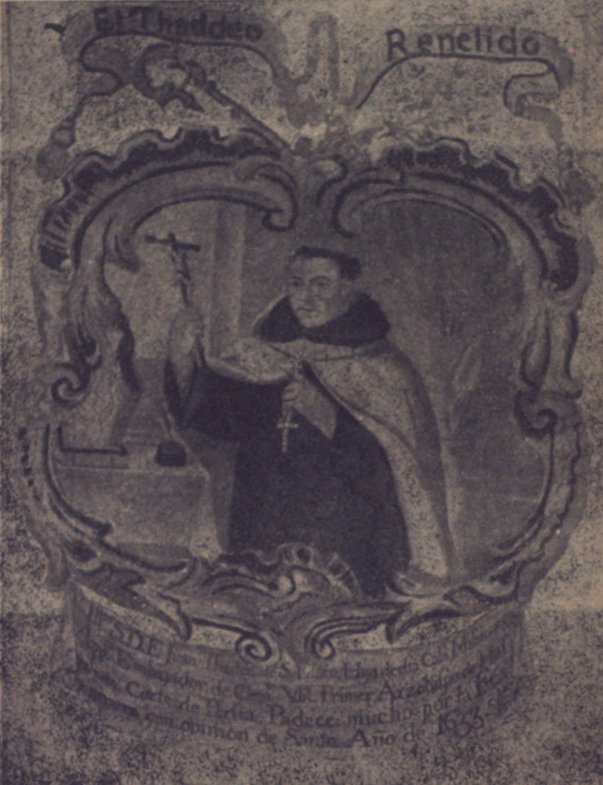
- Church: Catholic Church
- Diocese: Diocese of Ispahan
- In office: 1632–1633
- Predecessor: Office created
- Successor: Timoteo Pérez Vargas

Orders
- Consecration: 19 September 1632 by Bernardino Spada

Personal details
- Born: Juan Roldán Ibáñez; 17 August 1574 Calahorra, Spain
- Died: September 5, 1633 (aged 59) Lleida, Spain

Juan Boldames Ibáñez or Juan Roldán Ibáñez, O.C.D. (17 August 1574 – 5 September 1633), also known as John Thaddeus of Saint Eliseus in English publications (Spanish: Juan Tadeo de San Eliseo) was a Spanish Discacled Carmelite and a prelate of the Catholic Church. He served as the first Bishop of Ispahan (1632–1633) and Auxiliary Bishop of Toledo (1632–1633).

== Early life ==
Juan Boldames Ibáñez was born on 17 August 1574 in Calahorra, Spain to Juan Roldán and Catalina Ibáñez. As habit in the Discacled Carmelite novitiate, he came to Valladolid in 1596 and professed the following year on May 1. With a missionary vocation, after the Congregation of Discalced Carmelites of Spain renounced missions, he moved to Rome in 1600 to pursue his missionary desires. In 1601, he was sent to Naples, where he devoted himself to apostolic work and speaking to others about missions. Among his penitents was Francesco Cimino, Baron of Caccuri, who aspired to establish a seminary for missionary endeavors targeting Muslims and pagans enslaved in Christendom—an initiative later forsaken for pragmatic reasons and transformed into the objective of redeeming Mt. Carmel from the Turks through purchase, from which the Carmelites would disseminate the Gospel to Muslims.

Juan's fervor for missionary work in a Muslim region, proposed to the Congregation in Italy, initially faced censure from his superiors. This response was influenced by the division within the Order and the subsequent dispatch of several Spanish Religious to establish a presence in Italy, which stemmed from the General of the Spanish Congregation's unequivocal prohibition against any sanctioned missionary endeavors. However, over time, significant factions within the Italian Congregation became persuaded that it should incorporate a missionary dimension into its activities. In 1604, Pope Clement VIII sought to dispatch religious envoys to Shah Abbas I, presenting them as apostolic ambassadors. Noticing the Carmelites of Italy planning missionary endeavors in Palestine, the Pope convinced them to undertake his mission in Safavid Iran instead. Upon receiving the three missionaries designated to travel to Persia, Pope conferred upon Fr. Juan the extra name 'Thaddeus', commemorating one of the two Apostles traditionally credited with visiting the region.

== Travel ==
The route they finally chose was through Holy Roman Empire, Poland, Muscovy, and Desht-i Kipchak. Leaving Rome on 6 June 1604, they arrived in Venice on 17 July and in Prague 15 August. They departed from Krakow on April 25, 1605, due to the death of Clement VIII and the challenges of securing their route through Smolensk rather than Arkhangelsk. They were compelled to remain in Smolensk until December 1605 and arrived in Moscow in January 1606. Here, he managed to free Nicolas de Melo from his exile after meeting False Dmitry I who was perceived as sympathetic to Catholics and moved on to Kazan on April 2, 1606. The murder of Dmitry in May, resulted in numerous impediments to their travel. The new ruler of Muscovy, Vasily IV exhibited hostility, causing Fr. Juan Thaddeus and his associates to be detained in Tsaritsyn throughout the winter of 1606-1607 after departing Kazan on July 24, 1606. They endured semi-starvation, maltreatment, and an epidemic that claimed the lives of two members of their group.

On July 24, 1607, they departed from Tsaritsyn and, after encountering difficulties in Astrakhan (where Marina Mniszech and Nicolas de Melo was entrapped), entered Safavid realm approximately ten miles north of Baku on September 27, 1607. They reached Qazvin on November 19, 1607, and Isfahan on December 2, 1607. The inaugural audience with Shah Abbas I occurred on 3 January 1608 in Chaharbagh.

== Life in Iran ==
He officiated the wedding of Robert Sherley and Teresa Sampsonia on February 2, 1608. He quickly gained the confidence the Shah, who employed him as an interpreter and, in early 1611, dispatched him on a mission to Europe with merchants - Lucas Cornelio, a Greek and Khwaja Shevelin, an Armenian. He met Teimuraz of Kakheti, bringing him a letter of condolence from Shah on the death of his wife Anna Gurieli and later moved on to Derbend, where the governor proposed a site for a convent. He arrived in Astrakhan on March 25, 1611. There, the governor, Ivan Dmitrievich Khvorostinin, suspecting a conspiracy between Abbas and Sigismund III Vasa to invade Muscovy, arrested Fr. John Thaddeus along with his companions, imprisoning and even torturing them. His suspicions were further confirmed when he discovered that Juan carried letters for the Sigismund and for the Roman Pope, which made him believe that Juan was either a real spy dressed as a Roman friar or a Roman friar playing the real role of a spy and conspiring against Muscovy. He also met Fr. Nicolas de Melo here once again.

Nevertheless, the friar managed to send news to Iran with Lucas Cornelio. Upon receiving news, Shah instructed a trader named Khoja Murtuz to supply the friars with food and necessities; however, the governor obstructed these items from reaching them in their confinement. Once again notified, the Shah dispatched a severe message to Russians, threatening with invasion. Meanwhile, Ivan Zarutsky arrived with this Cossack host to besiege Astrakhan and killed Khvorostinin on September 16, 1613. However, friars related his death to a popular uprising. John Thaddeus left for Iran on October 28, 1613 and arrived Isfahan on the eve of Pentecost in 1614. During his absence, he was designated as Prior, having been appointed at the Chapter General in Rome; on May 23, 1614, all the Fathers present in Isfahan rendered him obedience. During his absence in Astrakhan, on April 20, 1616, the Praepositus General in Rome composed a 'clausula,' which remains extant in the archive.

In a letter dated February 12, 1616, from Isfahan, Fr. John Thaddeus recounted his visit to the Shah's encampment on Nowruz, March 21, 1615. During this public assembly, he sought permission to discuss the Gospel and recited the Ten Commandments rendered in Persian language. A letter from the renowned traveler Pietro della Valle, dated April 22, 1619, references the arrival of Fr. John Thaddeus at the Shah’s camp in Qazvin on June 19, 1618. He was warmly received by Abbas, who reproached him for his tardiness. Fr. Thaddeus explained that he had been occupied with translating the Psalms into Persian, as requested by the Shah. On May 8, the Shah summoned him to present the book of Psalms and an Arabic-printed book on the Gospels. On October 10, 1618, Father John Thaddeus departed from Ardabil—where he had accompanied the Shah from Sultanieh during the campaign against the Turkish invasion, seeking specific privileges for the Convent—and returned to Isfahan on October 28, 1618.

During the audience on February 8, 1619, with the Spanish ambassador, Garcia de Figueroa, the Shah appointed Fr. John Thaddeus as the interpreter. Following the ambassador's departure for Hormuz, he presented letters from the Spanish court to Shah Abbas on September 16, 1619, which had been conveyed by the ambassador. He was also called upon to interpret when Abbas I determined the price of the infamous silk consignment on September 27, 1619 regarding Dengiz beg Rumlu, which ultimately contributed significantly to the loss of Hormuz for the Spanish side. Pietro della Valle noted that Fr. John Thaddeus engaged in discussions with Shah on October 23, 1619, and January 5, 1620. He was subsequently visited by the Secretary of State, Aqa Mir, following Epiphany. Additionally, on March 4, 1620, Abbas even borrowed John Thaddeus’ spectacles to try. On March 4, 1620, he, accompanied by della Valle, visited Edward Monnox, the newly arrived English resident in Isfahan. Subsequent communications in 1620 indicate that he was contacted by the Luis de Gama, Portuguese Captain General at Hormuz concerning the tensions between Safavids and Portugal regarding the island. On September 15, 1620, he presented a letter from the Holy See and grievances from the captain to the Shah.

Back in Rome, certain leaders of the Carmelite Order at that time were evidently critical of the frequent interactions with the Iranian court, viewing them as indicative of an excessively worldly lifestyle. In response to these concerns, in a letter dated 1619, John Thaddeus countered criticisms by arguing that the directive to avoid interaction with secular figures, particularly the Shah, was contrary to the intentions of the Pope. He emphasized that the Pontiff’s mission was not only to focus on their own spiritual well-being but to also work for the salvation of all, including schismatics, heretics, and non-believers. Thaddeus pointed to the Papal Briefs, which encouraged engagement with the Shah, as clear evidence that maintaining a relationship with the king was essential. He recounted how the Shah himself expressed pleasure in being visited and how Thaddeus had successfully presented religious texts like the Psalms and Gospels, which the monarch received with reverence. Thaddeus also highlighted the importance of continuing to present such works, arguing that it opened opportunities to spread their faith. Additionally, he mentioned Abbas’ interest in the printing of Arabic and Persian characters, further demonstrating the value of their interactions.

The fall of Hormuz on 1 May 1622 dealt a significant blow to Fr. John Thaddeus and the Carmelites in Iran, impacting both their diplomatic position and financial support. Thanks to a favor owed by Imam Quli Khan, the governor of Fars, Fr. John was granted permission to reside in Shiraz, and a house was provided for the Carmelites (as well as helping Augustinians to establish a house). By August 1623, he had established a residence for the Carmelites there. In 1624, Fr. John completed a report on the mission, which included an analysis of Shah Abbas I's reign and was finalized in Rome after Shah Abbas' death in 1629. Fr. John continued to travel between Shiraz, Isfahan, and Masqat, managing missionary matters, paying debts, and acting as Vicar Provincial Substitute. After falling ill in Shiraz in 1625, he continued his work and eventually left Isfahan for Europe in 1628, carrying credentials from the Armenians of Iran to discuss unity with the Holy See.

Fr. John Thaddeus was detained in Aleppo for a period but left in March 1629, arriving in Naples on 12 September 1629, and then in Rome on 16 September 1629. On 29 October 1629, he met Pope at Castel Gandolfo and presented a letter from the Armenian bishop of New Julfa. According to the letter, they commissioned Fr. John to negotiate for an Armenian seminary in Iran, the printing and distribution of Armenian books, particularly the Testaments, and the appointment of a ‘Frank’ superior to protect them from Muslim persecution. For the next two years, Fr. John stayed mostly in seclusion at the Seminary of S. Maria della Vittoria. On 8 January 1630, the Definitory General collected information from him about the mission.

== As Bishop ==
In 1629, discussions in the Sacred Congregation centered on the appointment of a bishop in Iran. The debate included whether a Carmelite or Augustinian bishop should be chosen, following the successful creation of bishops in Illyria and Bosnia. The aim was to strengthen the Christian mission in Iran by ordaining Persian priests and using the Roman Rite rather than the Armenian rite, which was seen as containing errors from the Greek Orthodoxy. According to them, Iranians, known for their pride, would likely favor a bishop's authority over mere priests, as seen with the Armenian episcopal hierarchy. Fr. John Thaddeus was proposed as a suitable candidate due to his positive relationship with Shah Abbas and prominent figures from Iran, Armenia, and Georgia, as well as his knowledge of the local languages (he spoke Latin, Spanish, Portuguese, Italian, Persian, Arabic and Armenian). The Sacred Congregation approved the establishment of a Latin bishop in Iran on 2 October 1629. Fr. John Thaddeus was nominated for the position, but issues arose regarding the episcopal title, as the title "Tres Ecclesiae" (Echmiadzin) had already been assigned by Pope Paul V to an Augustinian hermit. Fr. John Thaddeus himself suggested that the bishop should come from the secular clergy rather than the regular clergy. Other candidates, including Giovanni Agostino Spinola (also known as Agatangelo di Gesù Maria) and a brother of Cardinal Spada, were also considered.

On 6 September 1632, he was appointed during the papacy of Pope Alexander VII as Bishop of Ispahan and Auxiliary Bishop of Toledo. The new bishop was assigned jurisdiction over the entire Safavid Empire, including Armenia, Georgia, and Alinja in Nakhchivan, but excluding Assyria and Mesopotamia. Due to concerns about his age and ensuring continuity after his death, a coadjutor with the right of succession, Timoteo Pérez Vargas from the Calced Carmelites, was appointed as Bishop of Babylon. Both bishops were consecrated on 18 September 1632 by Bernardino Spada, Cardinal-Priest of Santo Stefano al Monte Celio.

However, this appointment lasted short. In 1633, Bishop John Thaddeus set out from Rome to return to Iran, accompanied by his nephew, Fr. John of the Annunciation, and three other priests. He traveled via Spain, aiming to secure passage on a Portuguese fleet to Goa and transport books for work among the Armenians. He also hoped to recruit more priests in Spain to help establish the Armenian seminary. However, while crossing the mountains of Catalonia, his mule became frightened, causing him to fall and violently strike his side against a rock. Despite being taken to Lerida for care, he died from internal injuries three days later on 5 September 1633.

Catholic Church titles
Preceded by Office created	Bishop of Ispahan; 1632–1633	Succeeded by Timoteo Pérez Vargas
