= Alonso Remón =

Friar, playwright, and historian of Golden Age Spain

Alonso Remón O. de M.
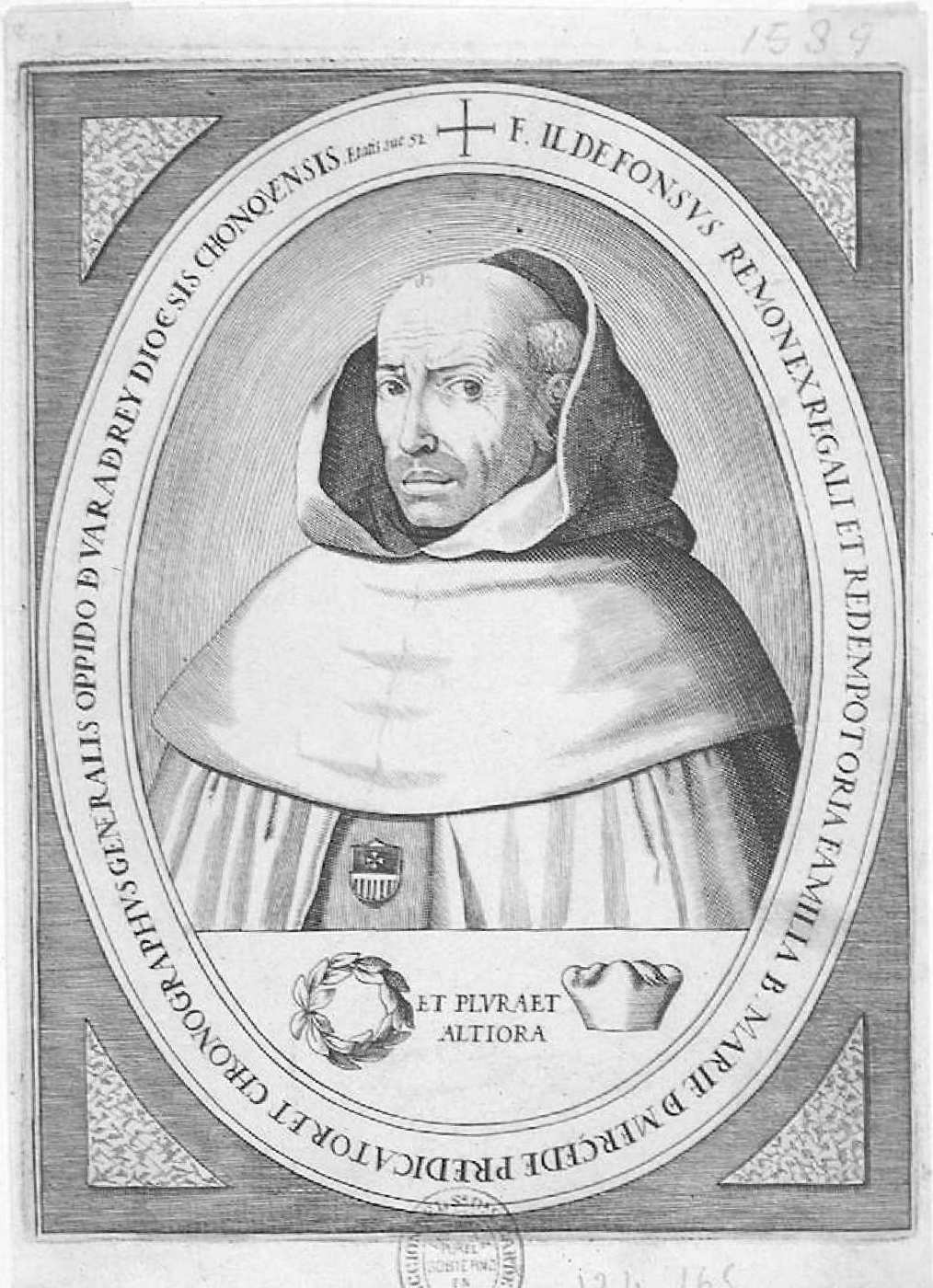
- Portrait of Alonso Remón. Anonymous engraving, illustration from his work Eetymon ieron, 1612. National Library of Spain.

Personal life
- Born: 1561 Vara de Rey, Cuenca, Crown of Castile
- Died: June 23, 1632 (aged 70–71) Madrid, Crown of Castile
- Education: University of Alcalá
- Occupation: Playwright

Religious life
- Religion: Roman Catholic
- Order: Order of the Blessed Virgin Mary of Mercy

Alonso Remón, O. de M. (Vara de Rey, Cuenca, 1561 – Madrid, 1632) was Spanish friar, playwright, prose writer, and orator of the Spanish Golden Age. He served as chronicler of the Order of Mercy and was a prolific author, known for his historical comedies, hagiographic works, and moral treatises.

== Early life and education ==
Alonso Remón was born in 1561 in Vara de Rey, a municipality in Cuenca, Spain, which was home to approximately eighty houses of hidalgos (minor nobility). He was the firstborn son of Alonso Remón and Catalina López de Araque. His grandparents were Fernando Remón and Catalina Sánchez de Onrubia, whom he described as "people of middle status, but with nobility and purity of blood." Remón began his education around the age of seven (1568), studying grammar with the Jesuits in Belmonte for approximately nine years. On October 30, 1577, at the age of sixteen, he enrolled at the University of Alcalá de Henares to study logic and dialectics. He continued his studies in physics and philosophy the following year. He graduated as a bachelor in 1580 and enrolled in theology in 1581, eventually earning his doctorate. Other students from his region were also enrolled, including Maximiliano de Céspedes from Olmedo.

== Literary career ==
As a dramatic author, he especially cultivated historical comedies (The Lord Don Juan of Austria in Flanders, of proven fidelity to the facts and perhaps his best work, or The Siege of Mons) as well as hagiographic ones (Saint John the Evangelist, 1588; The Saint Unborn and Martyr Undying or Saint Hyacinth, written, with its prologue, for the canonization festivities of this saint on April 17, 1594). Biographical are the two parts of The Spaniard Among All Nations and Grateful Cleric which he wrote about the life of the great Jaén-born traveler and adventurer Pedro Ordóñez de Cevallos, author of a History and Journey of the World which serves as his source. Also his are The Grandeurs of Madrid (1606) and The Three Women in One (from around 1609). He also composed two auto sacramental plays: The Prodigal Son (1599) and The Nymph of Heaven; he is also attributed with The Catholic Spaniard Saint Raymond Nonnatus and even The Man Condemned for Distrust by Tirso de Molina. In a Treatise on the Kingdoms of the Indies where his comedy about Pedro Ordóñez de Ceballos was included, it is said that he wrote more than two hundred comedies, but very few have reached today.

In 1604 he wrote the prologue for "Relations" of Don Juan de Persia. Maximiliano de Céspedes, Remón's friend, dedicated a sonnet to him. Remón himself gave literary form to these narratives, which were written in a non-Castilian language (Persian or Ajem-Turkic), and included another sonnet in honor of Don Juan.

He also wrote various moral and costumbrist treatises, such as History of the Image of Our Lady of Remedies of the Town of Madrid and Honest Entertainments and Games (1623). Also a Life of the Knight of Grace (1620). He prepared an edition of the True History of the Conquest of New Spain by Bernal Díaz del Castillo (1632), in which he possibly inserted his own materials. Many literary critics believe that "Guidance and notice to strangers coming to Court," (Spanish: Guía y aviso de forasteros que vienen a la Corte) published under the name Antonio Liñán y Verdugo in Madrid in 1620, is actually Remón's work.

== The Order of Mercy ==
In 1604, Remón entered the Order of Mercy in Toledo, where he professed on August 24, 1605, at approximately forty-four years of age. During his novitiate, he lived with Tirso de Molina, who had more than four and a half years of seniority over Remón. He was awarded a prize for composing sacramental autos for Corpus Christi. In the Book of Professions, he wrote that he wished to be called "Fra. Alonso de Jesús y San Benito," though he did not maintain this name. Remón likely moved to the Madrid convent around 1608, which was the provincial house of Castile and the general house of the Order. He would remain there for the rest of his life. According to Francisco de Benavides, Remón preached in the royal court for more than twenty-four years.

An interesting aspect of Remón's career is his association with the group of Arias Montano and other humanists who studied at Alcalá and opposed the authenticity of the "bronzes of the Sacromonte of Granada," which led them to fall from favor with Philip II. This may explain why Remón always resided in the Court under royal surveillance and why he did not hold positions in the Order beyond chronicler and historian of the Order in Castilian.

== Reputation ==
Remón was highly esteemed by his contemporaries. Miguel de Cervantes called him "A Licentiate of immense genius" in his "Viaje del Parnaso," depicting him in a group of "six religious persons" who concealed their poetic fame out of respect for their ecclesiastical status. Quevedo remarked that he remembered before "if there were no comedies by the good Lope de Vega and Ramón, there was nothing else." Despite these accolades, Remón's literary fame, particularly for his dramatic works, has not endured to the present day. The few plays that survive are generally considered inferior to those of his contemporaries like Tirso de Molina or Lope de Vega.

Alonso Remón died in Madrid on June 23, 1632.
