= Petrus de Monte Libano =

Petrus de Monte Libano was a Maronite friar from Lebanon who was sent in 1516 by Ludwig II of Hungary to the Persian court of the Safavid Empire to negotiate a Habsburg-Persian alliance against the Ottoman Empire.

That same year, he was sent by the Persian court to Poland with letters addressed to European monarchs proposing an anti-Ottoman alliance.

In October 1523 Petrus de Monte Libano was again sent on a mission to Emperor Charles V and Ludwig II of Hungary again to establish an alliance.
