= Nicolas de Melo =

Portuguese missionary (1548–1615)

Nicolas de Melo OSA
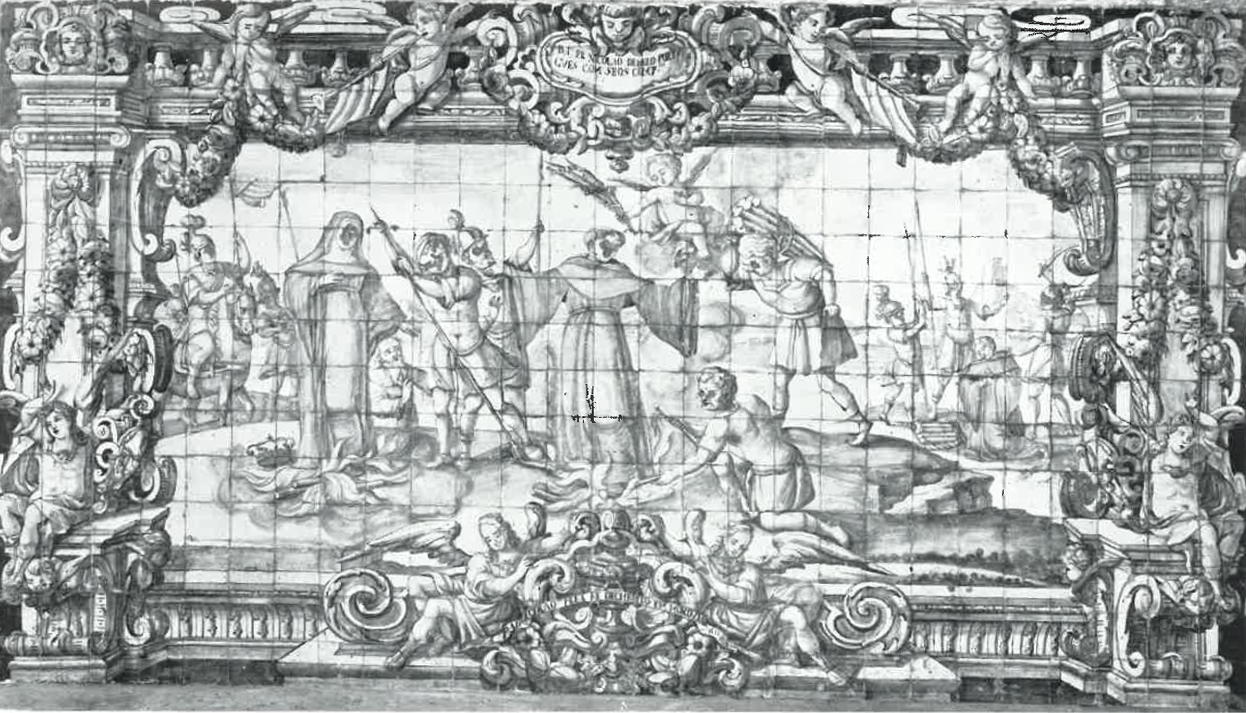
- Martyrdom of Nicola de Melo and Barbara Cazanowsky depicted on an azulejo at the Graça Convent in Lisbon

Personal life
- Born: 1548 Corichán, Kingdom of Portugal
- Died: January 28, 1615 (aged 66–67) Bear Island, in Ural River Delta, near modern Atyrau, Kazakhstan
- Cause of death: Death by burning
- Known for: Persian embassy to Europe (1599–1602)

Religious life
- Religion: Catholic
- Order: Order of Saint Augustine

Nicolás de Melo OSA (born Nicolás Morán Antúnez, 1548 – January 28, 1615) was a Portuguese Augustinian friar and missionary, whose life was marked by his extensive travels and martyrdom during his mission in Russia. He is recognized for his efforts in diplomatic and religious missions, particularly in Safavid Iran, and is venerated by some as a martyr due to his persecution and eventual death at the hands of anti-Catholic forces.

== Early life ==
Nicolás de Melo was born around 1548 in Corichán, Portugal (or Belmonte) to Francisco de Antúnez and Isabel Morán. It is unknown when he changed his surname. Although of modest origins, some sources claim that he was of noble birth. As a young man, Melo served King Sebastian of Portugal and later a merchant in Seville (according to Tomas Marquez) before eventually joining the Augustinian Order in Mexico in 1577, where he took his vows in Puebla. After studying theology and grammar, he embarked on missionary work in the Philippines in 1582. Melo engaged in missionary work in the southern Visayan Islands (especially Panay Island), ministering Aklan and Hamtic, but he later moved to the Tagalog region near Manila. He was eventually appointed as the novice master of the Augustinian monastery in Manila by the provincial superior of the Augustinian Order in the Philippines. This appointment was due to his rapid mastery of local languages and his significant missionary accomplishments, as well as his naturally good and devout character.

In 1596, a meeting of the Augustinian Order was held in Manila. During this meeting, two priests, Juan Tamayo and Diego de Guevara, were selected as representatives of the province to be sent to the general chapter in Rome. They set sail from Manila in the summer of that year, traveling via Mexico and the Atlantic Ocean to reach Rome. However, their ship was struck by a storm and drifted ashore in Tosa Province of Japan. The ship's captain made inappropriate remarks, which led to the confiscation of their cargo and, eventually, the reissuance of the ban on Christianity by Toyotomi Hideyoshi, culminating in the martyrdom of 26 Christians in Nagasaki. This incident later came to be known as San Felipe Incident. This led to Melo being appointed as their successor next year and entrusted with a mission to accompany friars to Macau and Malacca, as there was no bishop in the Philippines at that time to ordain new priests. He was appointed Procurator General for Augustinian Province of the Most Holy Name of Jesus of the Philippines on 29 August 1597, with a mission to the Curia in Rome and the Spanish Court.

== Travel ==
=== Iran ===
When De Melo departed Manila in November 1597, he brought Nicola, an 18-year-old Japanese convert whom he baptized, and his namesake - Nicolás de San Agustín. Their ship passed through Macau and Malacca but not until 1598 did the monks arrive in Goa and met Aleixo de Menezes. For another year, ships would not depart for Portugal due to the change in season. The priests made the decision to pass through the Safavid realm as a result. Alfonso Cordero was requested to join them by Simon, the bishop of the Church of St. Francis, when he was in Goa.

In February 1599, the monks departed from Goa and arrived in Hormuz. The priests traveled to Isfahan after learning that the new Spanish king's envoys had reached Shah Abbas's palace in Hormuz. But it wasn't until they got to Isfahan in April that they discovered these ambassadors were English Shirley brothers, not Spanish. They had met the Shah through a Venetian named Giacomo Fava, who had been to Iran the year before. Here, Melo encountered the English adventurer Anthony Shirley, who was leading an embassy on behalf of Shah Abbas I to the courts of Christian Europe, seeking to form a military alliance against the Ottoman Empire. Melo managed to join this diplomatic mission, carrying letters from the Shah to both the Pope and King Philip III of Spain. He sent informative letters to Antonio Fernández de Córdoba y Cardona (Spanish ambassador in Papal States) via Michel Angelo Corai. Shirley viewed Melo as an asset, given his position and connections to the Spanish crown. Shah Abbas, who entrusted the priest with embassies in Spain and Rome, inadvertently undermined the embassy's work. He was unfamiliar with European diplomatic practice, and when he presented credentials to the ambassadors, he made no distinction between who was the main ambassador. Shirley would later compete with Melo for the role. As a result, the relationship between the two quickly deteriorated, allegedly due to Sherley's coveting of Melo's wealth, which included a significant sum of money and precious diamonds entrusted to him during the journey.

=== Russia ===
The embassy crossed the Caspian Sea and arrived in Astrakhan, in 1599. Here, Shirley reportedly felt emboldened to act against Melo, believing that the Portuguese friar had less influence under Russian rule. Shirley had Melo imprisoned, confiscating his letters and possessions. According to various accounts, including that of Don Juan of Persia, Shirley attempted to kill Melo multiple times during their journey down the Volga River, but the friar was saved by the intervention of Safavid officials who had befriended him.

In Moscow, Melo was placed under arrest again, and Sherley accused him of various crimes. Shirley accuses Melo of violating Christian morals in his memoirs, even claiming that he slept with prostitutes while in Isfahan. According to Arnulf Hartmann, these were defamatory rumors spread by an Armenian priest who was translating for Melo in Hormuz and wanted to be a member of the embassy. During interrogations by Russian officials, Sherley allegedly struck Melo, further solidifying his hostile intent. Despite these actions, Melo continued to conduct his religious duties, including baptizing Lucia - the daughter (or granddaughter) of a Milanese doctor called Paolo Cittadini in Catholic rites which led to his eventual arrest. Cittadini was a personal physician to Feodor I of Russia.

=== Arrest ===
After five months of imprisonment in Moscow, Melo was deported to the Solovetsky Monastery in Northern Russia, a harsh prison during the reign of Boris Godunov. News reached to Iranian embassy when they were in Port of Arkhangelsk in July 1601. He remained there for six years under brutal conditions, enduring starvation, extreme cold, and physical abuse. Melo's suffering continued through the turbulent political landscape of Russia, which saw the rise and fall of several rulers.

In July 1605, three months after Boris Godunov died suddenly, False Dmitry took the throne in Moscow as the new Tsar. According to "Diary of Marina Mniszech", which was written by a Polish secretary of Marina Mniszech Melo was in contact with Dmitry's supporters. After gaining temporary freedom during the rule of False Dmitry, thanks to John Thaddeus of Saint Eliseus, a Carmelite friar who was sent by Clement VIII (or Paul V). This decision did not occur immediately after Dmitry took power but later. By the time the two Nicolases returned from Solovetsky to Moscow, Vasily IV Shuisky was already in power.

The two were questioned once more in Moscow, this time with an English interpreter from the Muscovy Company. The two received "favorable" treatment, but were nonetheless sent into exile. Melo was sent to the Monastery of Sts. Boris and Gleb in Rostov. It was home to the renowned ascetic Irenarch, whom Melo probably befriended. He was also in contact with Jerzy Mniszech, father of Marina Mniszech, who was now a widow. Meanwhile, his Japanese companion, Fr. Nicolás de San Agustín, was eventually killed in September 1611, executed by beheading in Nizhny Novgorod.

He soon was freed by Ivan Zarutsky. Melo became the chaplain to Marina Mniszech, following her to Astrakhan by 1613. According to Pierling, Marina and her son Ivan Dmitriyevich were accompanied by three Catholic priests. These included Father Antonius of the Bernardine Order, who had shared Marina's fate since her arrival in Moscow, John Thaddeus of the Carmelite Order, who had been in Safavid Iran on a mission and had now returned via the Caspian Sea, and Nicolas Melo, who had joined them from Nizhny Novgorod. At this time, Barbara Cazanowsky, a Polish noblewoman who had accompanied Marina from Poland, converted to Catholicism and joined the Augustinian Order under Melo's guidance.

In 1614, new tsar Mikhail Romanov's troops sailed down the Volga, approaching Astrakhan, seeing young Ivan as a potential rival. Zarutsky and Mniszech found themselves in a precarious situation and sent emissaries to appeal for assistance from Shah Abbas, seeking permission for asylum. However, in May 1614, Zarutsky, Marina, and several hundred Cossacks fled from Astrakhan, traveling along the northern coast of the Caspian Sea and entering the Ural River. On an island known as "Bear Island", Zarutsky's forces were surrounded by Romanov troops. On June 25, the Cossacks surrendered, handing over their leader Zarutsky and Marina with her son Ivan to the government troops.

== Death ==
John Thaddeus returned to Iran, departing from Astrakhan on the feast of Saint Simon and Saint Jude, October 28, 1613. This was the last time he saw de Melo. According to account of Thaddeus by August 1615, some Russian envoys who arrived in Isfahan and some Iranian merchants who came from Astrakhan told him with certainty that Melo had been burned alive, along with Barbara Cazanowsky, a venerable Polish Catholic matron and aunt of Marina Mniszech. Thaddeus placed great trust in the Russian envoys' report, particularly since one of them had hosted him in his home and seemed entirely trustworthy.

The death of Nicolás de Melo was widely regarded as a martyrdom, and he was considered a Beatus and Venerable by contemporaries such as Luis Piñeiro and Georges Maigret. Antonio de Gouvea collected testimonies regarding Melo's martyrdom and sent them to church authorities in Portugal and Rome. Despite early efforts to initiate his beatification process, it was never formally completed.
