= Olivares de Duero =

Coordinates: 41°38′N 4°22′W

Olivares de Duero, Spain
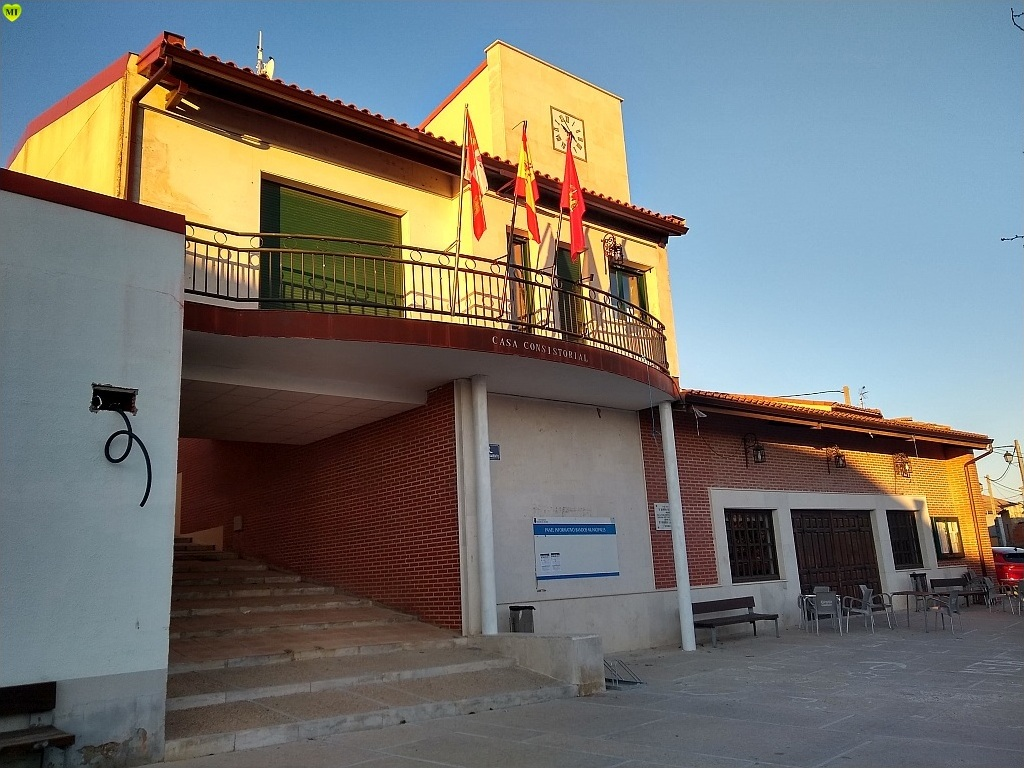
- Town hall

- Coat of arms
- Interactive map of Olivares de Duero, Spain
- Country: Spain
- Autonomous community: Castile and León
- Province: Valladolid
- Municipality: Olivares de Duero

Area
  - Total: 29 km^{2} (11 sq mi)

Population (2025-01-01)
  - Total: 328
  - Density: 11/km^{2} (29/sq mi)
- Time zone: UTC+1 (CET)
  - Summer (DST): UTC+2 (CEST)

Olivares de Duero is a municipality located in the province of Valladolid, Castile and León, Spain. According to the 2004 census (INE), the municipality has a population of 330 inhabitants.
