= Habsburg–Persian alliance =

16th century political alliance

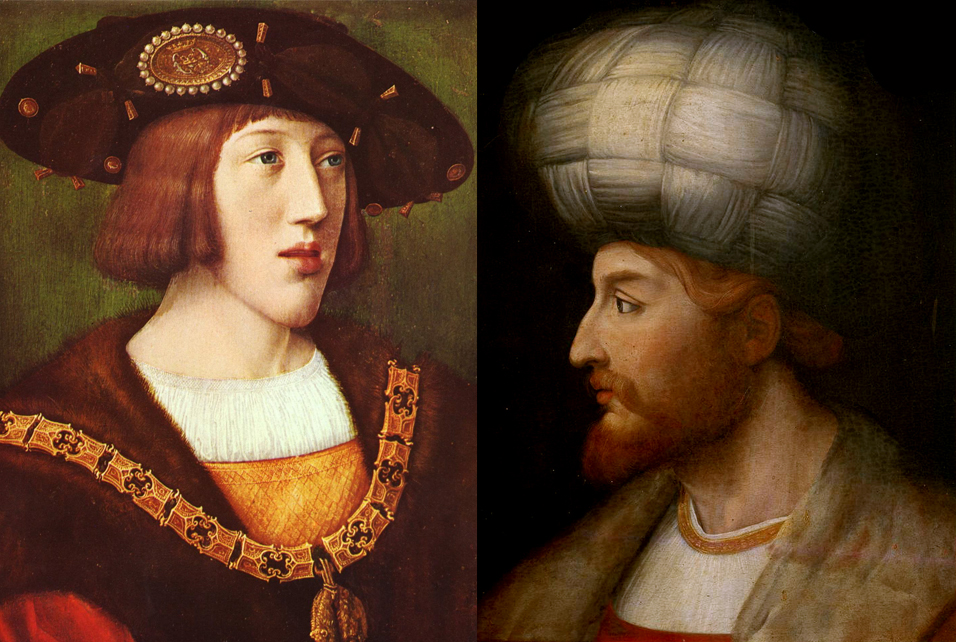
Attempts at forming a Habsburg–Persian alliance against the Ottoman Empire were first initiated by Charles V and Shah Ismail in 1516–19.

A Habsburg–Persian alliance (Persian: اتحاد ایران-هابسبورگ; also Habsburg–Safavid alliance (اتحاد صفوی-هابسبورگ) or Habsburg–Iran alliance) was attempted and to a certain extent achieved in the 16th century between the Habsburg Empire and Safavid Iran in their common conflict against the Ottoman Empire.

== First contacts ==
During the reign of the Persian Shah Ismail, exchanges occurred between him and Charles V, and Ludwig II of Hungary in view of combining against the Ottoman Turks. Charles, then king of Spain as Charles I, sent an envoy to propose an alliance to the Shah of Persia between 1516 and 1519. Also in 1516, Ludwig II sent a Maronite friar by the name of Petrus de Monte Libano with the same mission.

The response to these letters has not been preserved, but in 1523 Shah Ismail sent a letter in Latin offering to Charles V to coordinate military operations against the common Ottoman enemy, again using Petrus of Monte Libano as an emissary. The envoys visited Charles V in Burgos in March 1524 "to ask for an alliance against the Turks". Nothing concrete however seems to have come out of these first exchanges. Charles accepted the alliance in principle, but the death of Shah Ismail in 1524 effectively invalidated the agreement.

== Ottoman–Safavid War ==
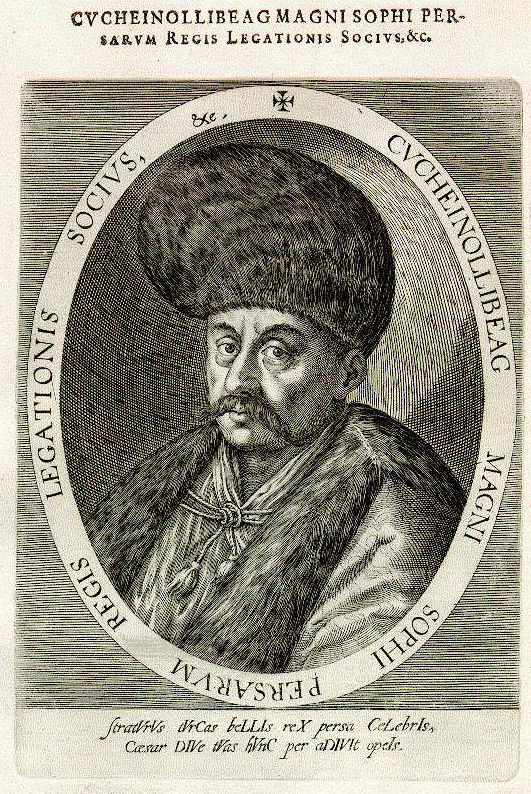
The Persian ambassador Husain Ali Beg during the Persian embassy to Europe (1599–1602).

Finally, on 18 February 1529, Charles V, deeply alarmed by the Ottoman progression towards Vienna, again sent a letter from Toledo to Shah Ismail, who had died in 1524 and had been replaced by Shah Tahmasp, pleading for a military diversion. His ambassador to the Shah was the knight of Saint John de Balbi, and an alliance was made with the objective of making an attack on the Ottoman Empire in the west and the east within the following year. Tahmasp also responded by expressing his friendship to the Emperor. A decision was thus taken to attack the Ottoman Empire on both fronts, but Balbi took more than one year to return to the Persian Empire, and by that time the situation had changed in Persia, as Persia was forced to make peace with the Ottoman Empire because of an insurrection of the Shaybanid Uzbeks.

About the same time, envoys were also sent to Persia by King Ferdinand of Austria (and brother of Charles V), in the person of Pietro da Negro and Simon de Lillis, without success. Other legations were sent in 1532 and 1533. These exchanges were effectively followed however by the long Ottoman–Safavid War (1532–1555). From that time, as soon as the Ottomans would launch a European campaign, they would be attacked by the Persians on their eastern frontier, forcing Suleiman to return speedily to his capital.

Meanwhile, King Francis I of France, enemy of the Habsburgs, and Suleiman the Magnificent were moving forward with a Franco-Ottoman alliance, formalized in 1536, that would counterbalance the Habsburg threat. In 1547, when Suleiman attacked Persia, France sent him the ambassador Gabriel de Luetz to accompany him in his campaign. Gabriel de Luetz was able to give decisive military advice to Suleiman, as when he advised on artillery placement during the Siege of Vān.

== Further attempts ==
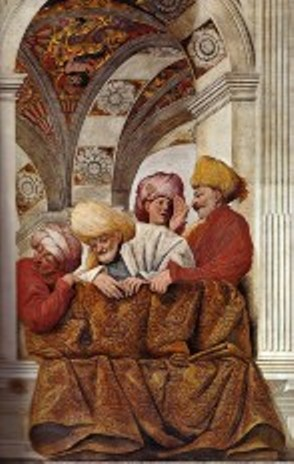
Fresco of the Persian embassy to Europe (1609–1615) visiting Pope Paul V in Rome, painted in 1615–1616. Sala dei Corazzieri, Palazzo del Quirinale, Rome.

The Persians effectively entered into conflict with the Ottoman Empire on five occasions in the Ottoman–Persian Wars, weakening the Ottoman Empire considerably every time, and effectively opening a second front when the Ottoman Empire was in conflict in Europe, to the rejoicing of Habsburg Europe. It was a great relief for the Habsburgs, and appeared as the realization of the old Habsburg–Persian alliance stratagem.

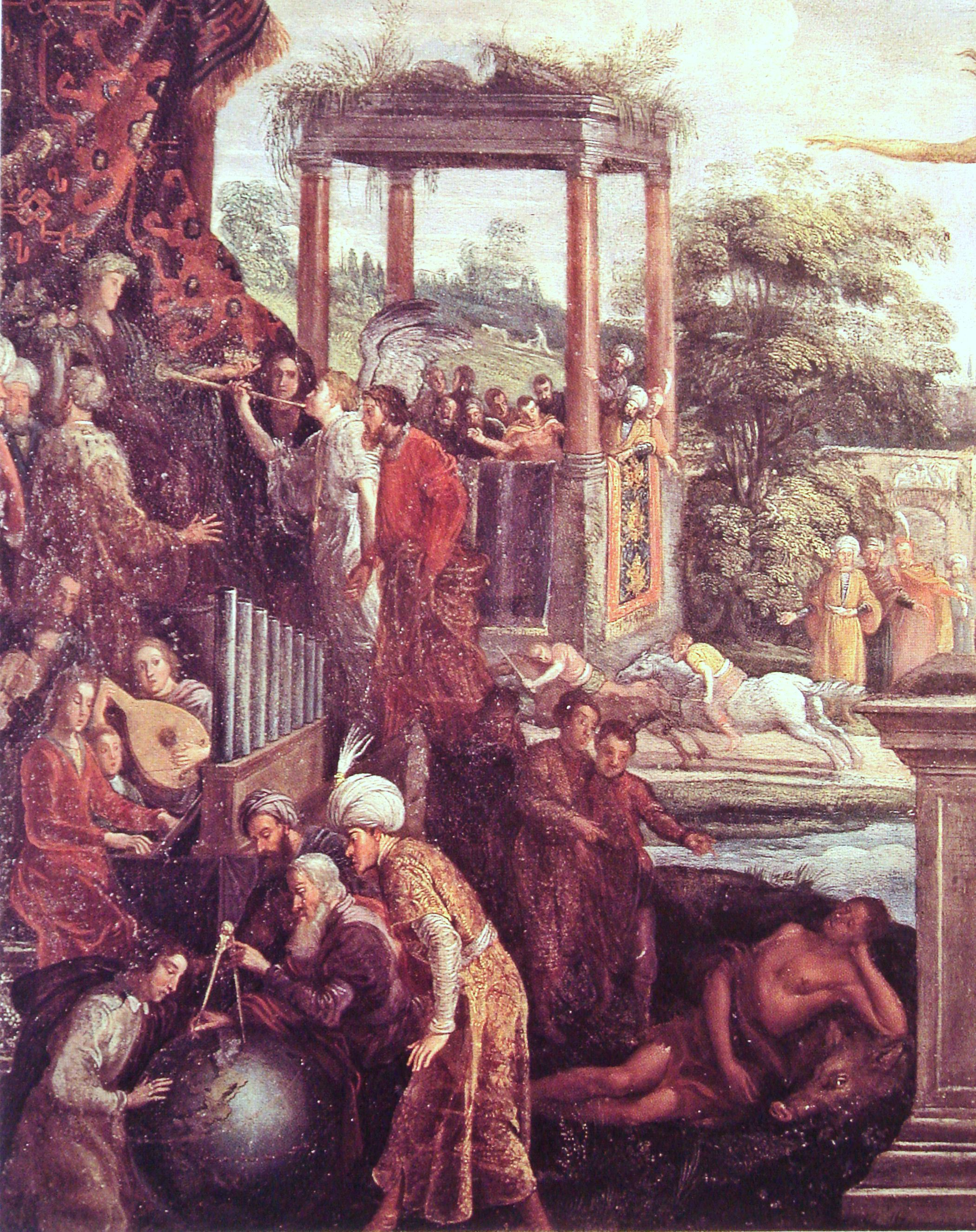
Abbas I as a new Caesar being honoured by the Trumpets of Fame, together with the Persian embassy to Europe (1609–1615), in Allégorie de l'Occasion, by Frans II Francken, 1628.

After a period of trouble in Persia, contacts between Austria and Persia were resumed in 1593 when Emperor Rudolf II sent from Prague a message to Shah ʿAbbās through the Persian minister in Moscow. Further efforts towards an alliance were also undertaken by the English adventurer Anthony Sherley acting as intermediary. Numerous similar diplomatic efforts to combine against the Ottomans would continue into the 17th century, especially with the Persian embassy to Europe (1599–1602) and the Persian embassy to Europe (1609–1615).

== See also ==
- Franco-Ottoman alliance
- Franco-Persian alliance
- Ottoman–Habsburg wars

== Sources ==
- Garnier, Edith L'Alliance Impie Editions du Felin, 2008, Paris ISBN 978-2-86645-678-8 Interview
