= Persian embassy to Europe (1599–1602) =

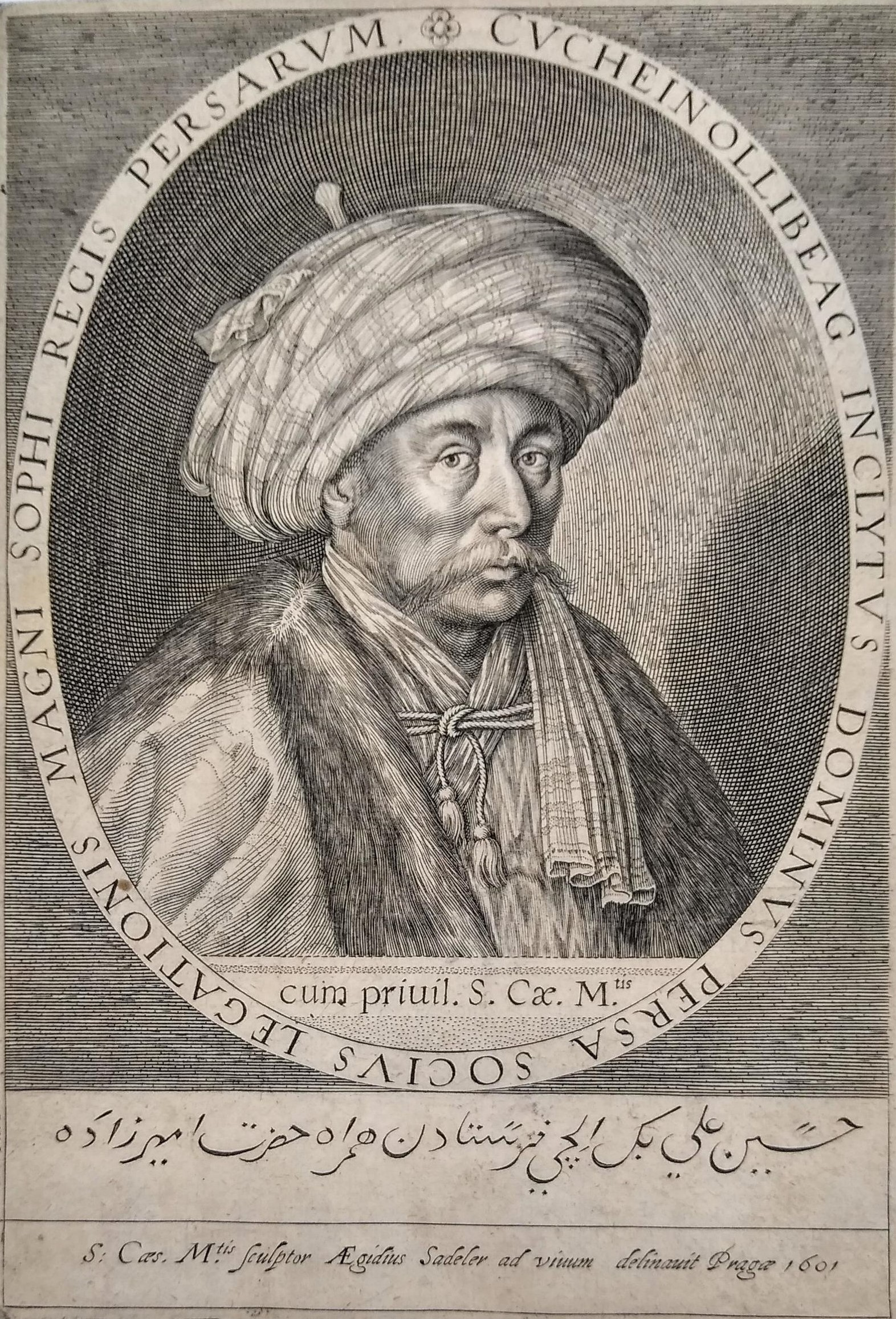
The ambassador Hossein Ali Beg, in a portrait from life by Aegidius Sadeler in Prague, 1601

The Persian embassy to Europe (1599–1602) was dispatched by the Persian Shah Abbas I in 1599 to obtain an alliance against the Ottoman Empire. The Persians had then been at war with the Ottoman Empire for more than a century, and so decided to try to obtain European help against the Ottomans. Besides the territorial antagonism of the Ottoman and Persian realms, there was also strong religious antagonism, as the Persians proclaimed Shiism against the Ottoman Empire's Sunnism. The objective of the mission was to establish a European–Persian alliance against the Ottoman Turks. These Persian efforts at rapprochement with Europe followed the Persian defeat against the Ottoman Empire in the Ottoman–Safavid War (1578–1590). These diplomatic contacts also took place during the Long Turkish War (1593–1606), when the Habsburg monarchy was fighting the Ottoman Empire in Hungary.

== Plan ==
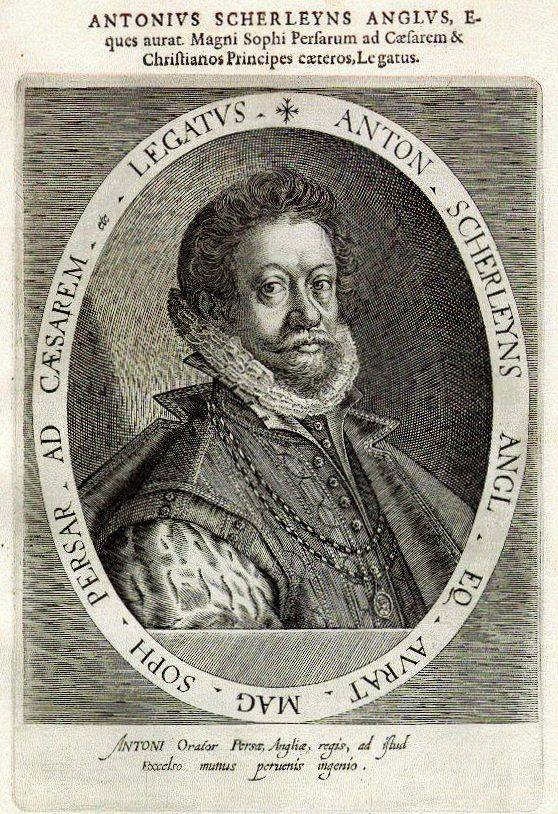
Anthony Shirley convinced the Persian ruler Abbas I to send an embassy to Europe, and accompanied it in its journey.

The embassy was composed of one ambassador, Hossein Ali Beg, and four secretaries (First Secretary Uruch Beg, son of Sultan Ali Beg; the nephew of the ambassador 'Ali Quli Beg; and two others) and led by the English adventurer Sir Anthony Shirley. Shirley had sailed from Venice on 24 May 1599 with 25 other Englishmen, bound for Aleppo, and had found favour with King Abbas I. Various contacts had already taken place between the Persians and Europe, as with the embassy of Anthony Jenkinson from Queen Elizabeth I in 1562.

The plan was to visit eight European courts, with one additional Special Envoy who would stay as the Persian ambassador at the court of Russian Emperor Boris Godunov. The embassy effectively met with three German potentates, and the Italian and Spanish courts, but initial plans to meet with the courts of France, England, Scotland and Poland were abandoned on the way.

== Itinerary ==
Persian envoys at the court of Rudolf II, depicted in the Vladislav Hall at Prague Castle

The embassy left in July 1599 for Astrakhan. They reached Moscow in November 1599, where they were received by Tsar Boris Godunov. Two members of the embassy, the Catholic priests Nicolas de Melo and Nicolás de San Agustín, were arrested in Russia at the instigation of Anthony Shirley and deported to the Solovetsky Monastery.

After a long voyage, rest of the embassy reached Prague in Bohemia in the autumn of 1600, where they met with emperor Rudolf II and were sumptuously received over the winter. In Spring 1601 they set for Munich, where they met with William V, the former Duke of Bavaria. They then went to Italy, where they were received by Vincenzo Gonzaga in Mantua. The embassy failed to meet the Doge of Venice, as he declined an interview on the ground that he was meeting an ambassador from the Ottoman Empire. The final portion of their mission took them to Spain, where they met with king Philip III, and obtained seaborne transportation from Portugal to the Strait of Hormuz and Persia. In a final incident however, one of the members of the embassy, a religious mullah, was stabbed to death by a Spaniard in Mérida. After discussions to obtain redress, the embassy set sail for Persia from Lisbon in early 1602.

Persian travel
1 Astrakhan - July 1599
2 Moscow - November 1599
3 Prague - 1600
4 Munich - 1601
5 Mantua
6 Lisbon - 1602

== Aftermath ==
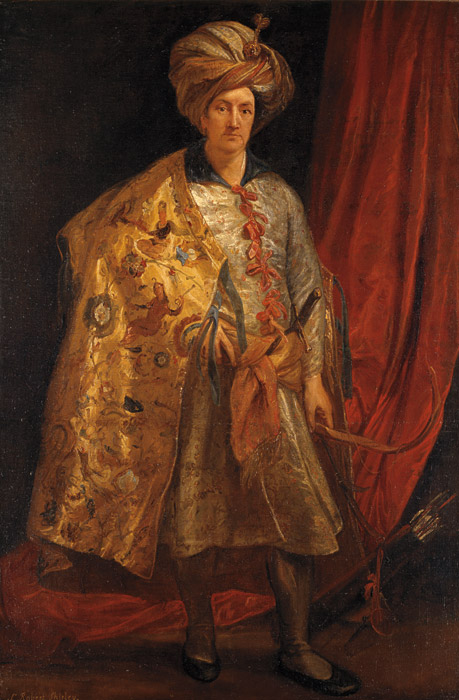
Robert Shirley modernized the Persian army leading to the Persian victory in the Ottoman–Safavid War (1603–1618), and led a second Persian embassy to Europe.

The embassy was immediately followed by a new conflict between Persia and the Ottoman Empire, the Ottoman–Safavid War (1603–1618), in which the Persians succeeded partly through the major military reforms and modernizations organized by the Englishman Robert Shirley, brother of Anthony Sherley.

A second Persian embassy to Europe (1609–1615) would be set up, this time led by Robert Sherley himself, which went to Kraków, Prague, Florence, Rome, Madrid, London, and returned to Persia through the Great Mogul's India.

In 1616, a trade agreement was reached between Shah Abbas and the East India Company and in 1622 "a joint Anglo-Persian force expelled the Portuguese and Spanish traders from the Persian Gulf".

In 1624, Robert Sherley led another embassy to England in order to obtain trade agreements.

A Persian embassy to Louis XIV occurred in 1715.

== See also ==
- Habsburg-Persian alliance
