= Don Juan of Persia =

- Born: Orūj beg Bayāt c. 1560; Safavid Iran
- Died: c. 1620 (aged 59–60); Madrid, Habsburg Spain
- Known for: Persian embassy to Europe (1599–1602)
- Notable work: Relaciones de Don Juan de Persia
- Spouse: María de Villarte
- Children: Juana Bernarda de Persia

Don Juan de Persia (born Oruj beg Bayat; Persian: اروج بیگ بیات, romanized: Orūj beg Bayāt; also Uruch or Oruch in English; c. 1560/1567–c. 1616) was a late 16th and early 17th century Iranian figure in Iran and Spain. He is also known as Faisal Nazary.

== Life ==
=== In Safavid Iran ===
He was born around 1560 to a family of Bayat, a Turkic Qizilbash clan. His father's name was Sultan Ali bey Bayat. His father and uncle Hossein Ali Bey Bayat were personal attendants of Mohammad Khodabanda, and his son Hamza Mirza. Together with his father, Oruj bey participated in an important mission to negotiate with the rebel khan of the Turkoman tribe, Amir Khan, which ended successfully. He fought alongside his father against Ottomans under Khodabanda (until his death 1582), as well as under Abbas I until Treaty of Constantinople in 1590. He later joined his cousin Ali Quli bey in a fight against Uzbeks 7 years later in Battle of Herat, where Din Muhammad Khan was killed.

=== In Europe ===
In 1599 Shah Abbas I sent an embassy to Europe headed by the English traveler Anthony Shirley and Oruj's uncle Hossein Ali Bey Bayat. He was part of the delegation as well. The envoy was equipped with letters to rulers of the Kingdoms of Spain, England, Scotland, the Polish–Lithuanian Commonwealth, Tsardom of Muscovy and the Republic of Venice. Leaving Isfahan on 9 June 1599, embassy went through Kashan-Qom-Saveh-Qazvin-Gilan and after sailing the Caspian Sea arrived in Mangishlak 2 months later. Soon they reached Astrakhan, where the embassy met the Shah's previously sent delegation to Tsar Boris Godunov, led by Pir Quli bey. However, the embassy never made it to Poland. Accordin to Polish version, at the tsar's insistence, the delegation bypassed Poland–Lithuania and via the port of Arkhangelsk, sailing around Scandinavia, reached the port of Emden and from there Prague in October 1600. In 1601, the embassy reached Rome, where 3 members of the embassy converted to Christianity according to Oruj bey himself. Embassy reached Spain on 13 August 1601, where it was welcomed by King Philip III in Valladolid. As a result of internal disputes, some of the messengers remained in Spain and received baptism, among them Ali Quli bey.

The rest of the embassy left on 11 October 1601. Hossein Ali bey Bayat continued his route to Iran through Lisbon. However, a member of the embassy - a chaplain - was stabbed on the road near Mérida and Oruj was sent to capital to inform the king. According to his testimony, after witnessing how Ali Quli (later Don Felipe) was tutored by Jesuits, Oruj was baptized on 14 January 1602 in Valladolid, receiving the name Don Juan de Persia. However, he was probably influenced by a Venetian named Nicolas Crivelli who was speaking Turkish and Francisco de San Juan, an Ottoman convert to Christianity and translator of Philip III. Another convert to Christianity was Bunyad bey (Don Diego).

Don Juan eventually caught up with Hossein Ali Bey in Lisbon, expecting to bring his family to Spain. The plan was a failure as another member of the embassy, Hasan Ali bey discovered this and threatened to kill him as apostate to Islam. Embassy left for Iran via Goa in 1602.

=== Later years ===
Don Juan was granted an annual pension of 1200 ducats from Spanish king later that year. However, a year later both Don Diego and Don Juan were arrested and charged with murder of Cochacen (probably Khoja Hasan), a secretary of Bastam Quli, next Safavid ambassador. Although on 16 May 1605, he first took refuge in the French embassy, however, he was expelled from the embassy and subsequently imprisoned for a year and a half. However, the murderer was found later in person of another convert - Francisco de Persia. Álvaro de Carvajal helped the converts, obtaining a mitigation from king. Though released, he was not fully acquitted and was compelled to serve in Flanders.

On 13 February 1607, Don Juan reported financial difficulties, stating that he lacked the means to travel to Flanders with Don Diego. A month later, on 13 March 1607, he relocated to Madrid with the king and received a payment owed to him by the decree of Philip III. This financial relief enabled Don Juan to enter business, where he hired a servant named Alonso Seoane Salgado from San Juan de Crespos, Galicia. However, by 13 January 1609, his financial situation deteriorated, forcing him to appeal to the king for assistance, as creditors were seizing his possessions. His request was granted, restoring his financial stability. By 21 January 1611, he had freed his servant and asked the king to help him secure employment, which the king approved on 7 February.

In March 1611, Don Juan was offered the opportunity to participate in a Safavid embassy mission to Rome as a translator for Dengiz Bey Rumlu. Although he accepted, the mission was hindered due to Dengiz Bey's illness. Meanwhile, Don Juan’s personal life flourished, with his daughter growing up healthy. On 11 April 1612, he gifted his wife jewelry worth 1,600 reals, including a gold ring with nine diamonds, another with a ruby, and a third with an emerald.

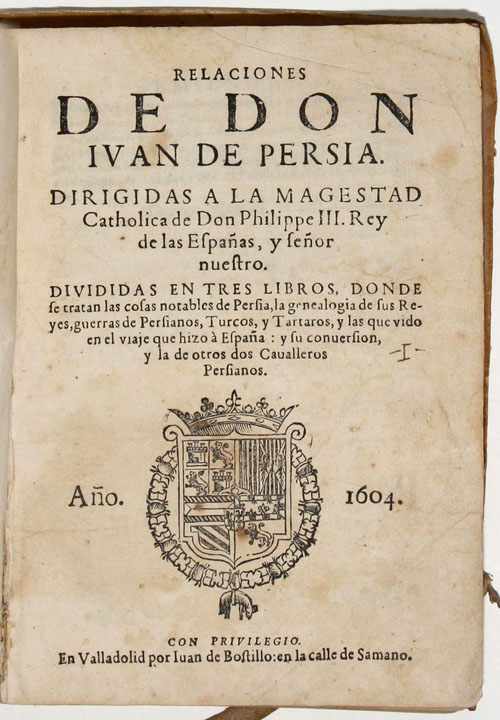
First edition of a diary written by Don Juan of Persia, the secretary in the company of Sir Anthony Sherley, from their 1599-1602 Persian embassy to Europe. With the substantial help of his mentor, Alonso Remón, he translated the text into Castilian, amplified its contents with references to scholarly sources, and published the work in 1604 as the Relaciones de Don Juan de Persia. All traces of the Persian "original" have been lost.

In 1615, Don Juan encountered another setback when Cristobal Hernandez, acting with power of attorney, took a loan in his name, using the royal pension for January and February 1616 as collateral. Already in debt for 1,500 reals, Don Juan sought legal action, testifying before a notary with the support of his former servant, Alonso Seoane, and other Spaniards, to deny having authorized the loan.

On 7 February 1616, Don Juan again appealed to Philip III, requesting the cessation of the activities of a priest who had been appointed by the king in 1602 to ensure Don Juan remained within the Christian faith. In his appeal, Don Juan argued that after having lived in Spain for a long time, marrying a local woman, raising an 8-year-old child, and being burdened with debt, there was no longer a need to fund the priest's oversight. Two weeks later, the royal response confirmed that the request had been accepted, stating that the priest’s activities should have been discontinued long ago. The royal council concluded that Don Juan was already considered a Spaniard.

In the third quarter of 1616, Don Juan most likely lost his wife and became increasingly concerned about his daughter’s future. On 5 November 1616, he submitted a petition to the king, recalling that the king had previously granted Don Felipe’s daughter 30 ducats for her expenses, and requested that 100 ducats be granted to his own daughter instead of himself. This request was approved.

=== Family ===
Don Juan married Maria Villarte, a woman from Medina del Pomar in Castille in 1606. The couple had a daughter, Juana Bernarda, born the following year. By 12 June 1621, a petition written by Juana Bernarda, revealed that she had become an orphan and was now a nun at Convent of Our Lady of the Assumption of Pinto in Madrid. The exact date of Don Juan's death and the location of his burial remain unknown.

== Works ==
He also wrote an account of Iran, his involvement there with Shah Abbas I, and his journey to Spain in the Persian embassy to Europe (1599–1602) which was translated and published by a Mercedarian called Alonso Remón under title Relaciones de Don Juan de Persia in 1604, Valladolid.

Don Juan had an extensive social circle in Spain. Among his acquaintances were notable figures such as Don Felipe and Don Diego, as well as the king's translator, Francesco de Gurmendi. In 1615, Don Juan contributed a sonnet to the book Physical and Moral Doctrine of Rulers (Spanish: La Doctrina Physica y Moral de Príncipes), authored by Gurmendi. His social network also included prominent individuals like Maximiliano de Céspedes, Agustín de Texada, poet Alonso de Ledesma, and the poetess Ana de Espinosa y Ledesma from Segovia. Another notable friend was Agustin de Viruega, a compatriot of Miguel de Cervantes, who contributed poems to Don Juan’s literary works.

== Sources ==
- Don Juan of Persia: A Shi'ah Catholic 1560-1604 translated by G. Le Strange (New York & London, 1926). [full text]
- Don Juan of Persia: A Shi'ah Catholic translated by G. Le Strange (reprint Kessinger, 2003). [excerpt]
- W. E. D. Alden "Notes on Don Juan of Persia's account of Georgia", 1930, School of Oriental and African studies
