= Dengiz Beg Rumlu =

Iranian courtier

Safavid ambassador to Habsburg Spain
- In office 1611–1612
- Monarch: Abbas the Great

Personal details
- Died: 1613

Dengiz Beg Rumlu (Note: Also spelled "Denghiz".) (died 1613) was an Iranian courtier, who served as merchant-envoy to Habsburg Spain during the reign of Safavid king (shah) Abbas I (r. 1588–1629).

== Biography ==
The Portuguese diplomat and missionary Antonio de Gouvea mentions him in his Relaçam as an old nobleman of Abbas's own household and one of the captains of the Shah's army, and lord of the town of Camará (possibly modern Kamareh district). De Gouvea recounts a Persian night assault on a Ottoman-held fortress, where a valorous young man named Aras Beg, described as son of Dengiz Beg who was one of the few Persians killed, cut down by an Ottoman soldier after he'd already taken four enemy heads.

In late 1609, Abbas I sent De Gouvea (now in Safavid service) back to Spain (at that time Portugal was in Iberian Union with Spain) and Rome in order to construct an alliance against the common enemy; the Ottoman Turks. Dengiz Beg Rumlu, merchant by profession and a member of the Turkoman Rumlu tribe, was assigned to accompany de Gouvea as merchant-envoy with some 100 bales of raw silk. Before departing, the embassy stopped for four days at Dengiz Beg's home town of Camará, which had been suffering a two-year drought. The townspeople asked the Augustinian friars to pray for rain during Mass; rain followed the next day, which Gouvea framed as evidence of divine favor toward the Catholic priests, much to Dengiz Beg's pride in front of his own people.

At the Spanish court of Philip III (r. 1598–1621), where they arrived in 1611, a major misunderstanding arose; Dengiz Beg had sold more than half of the total bales of silk for his own profit. (Note: According to Blow (2009), it would be hard to believe that Dengiz sold half of the total amount of silk; had Dengiz done so, "he certainly would not have dared to return to Iran".) De Gouvea, without any sort of compromise with the Iranian government, suddenly offered the remaining number of silk bales as a gift to the Spanish king, even though the Iranians had intended to sell them as a sample of the silk they intended to deliver in the future. De Gouvea and Dengiz secured a trade agreement with Philip III, but it proved to be of no value for the Spanish government never adopted it. They also urged for a blockade of the Red Sea, but they were reportedly "no more successful" in this than Robert Shirley.

Conform Abbas I's desire, at the Spanish court, Dengiz Beg Rumlu supported the elevation of de Gouvea to the rank of bishop of Cyrene and Apostolic vicar of the Armenians of the royal capital of Isfahan.

Dengiz Beg and de Gouvea set sail for Safavid Iran from Lisbon in March 1612 with gifts and presents from the Habsburg crown. Dengiz Beg received a coat of mail and a specific sword which he himself had requested from Philip III. He also received a gold chain, a gold sword, a portrait of Philip III decorated with numerous costly gems, as well as some horse trappings which he liked to have.

In the spring of 1613, Dengiz Beg appeared at the Iranian court. Reportedly, as he went down on his knees to kiss the king's foot, Abbas kicked him and ordered for his execution. It appears that king Abbas had appointed a person in Dengiz's suite to spy on him in Europe, for Abbas was already aware of Dengiz's wrongdoings before his presentation at court. Amongst others, Dengiz Beg was accused of treating the members of his mission extremely bad; this had resulted in some of them converting to Christianity and staying in Europe. Abbas' anger with Dengiz Beg was most likely increased by Philip III's meager responses and actions and for "reawakening" his dissatisfaction with the Portuguese occupation of Hormuz. When Abbas then also found out that the silk had been given to Philip III as a gift rather than being sold, he became furious. When Abbas later received de Gouvea, he also discovered that Dengiz Beg had received nothing of equal value in return; the presents and goods were all a gift, and not payment for the silk; and they were, reportedly, not even nearly as costly as the bales of silk that de Gouvea had given to Philip III.

Dengiz Beg was executed in 1613. It remains unclear what the precise reason was; it may be that his role in the "silk affair" proved to be the straw that broke the camel's back.

== Sources ==
- Blow, David (2009). Shah Abbas: The Ruthless King Who Became an Iranian Legend. I.B.Tauris. ISBN 978-0857716767.
- Butler, John Anthony (2012). Travels in Africa, Persia, and Asia the Great, by Sir Thomas Herbert. ACMRS Publications. ISBN 978-0866984751.
- Matthee, Rudi (2002). "GOUVEA, ANTONIO DE". Encyclopaedia Iranica, Vol. XI, Fasc. 2. pp. 177–179.
- Flood, Finbarr Barry; Necipoglu, Gulru, eds. (2017). A Companion to Islamic Art and Architecture (Vol. 1). John Wiley & Sons, Inc. p. 955. ISBN 978-1119068570.
