= Granadan school of sculpture =

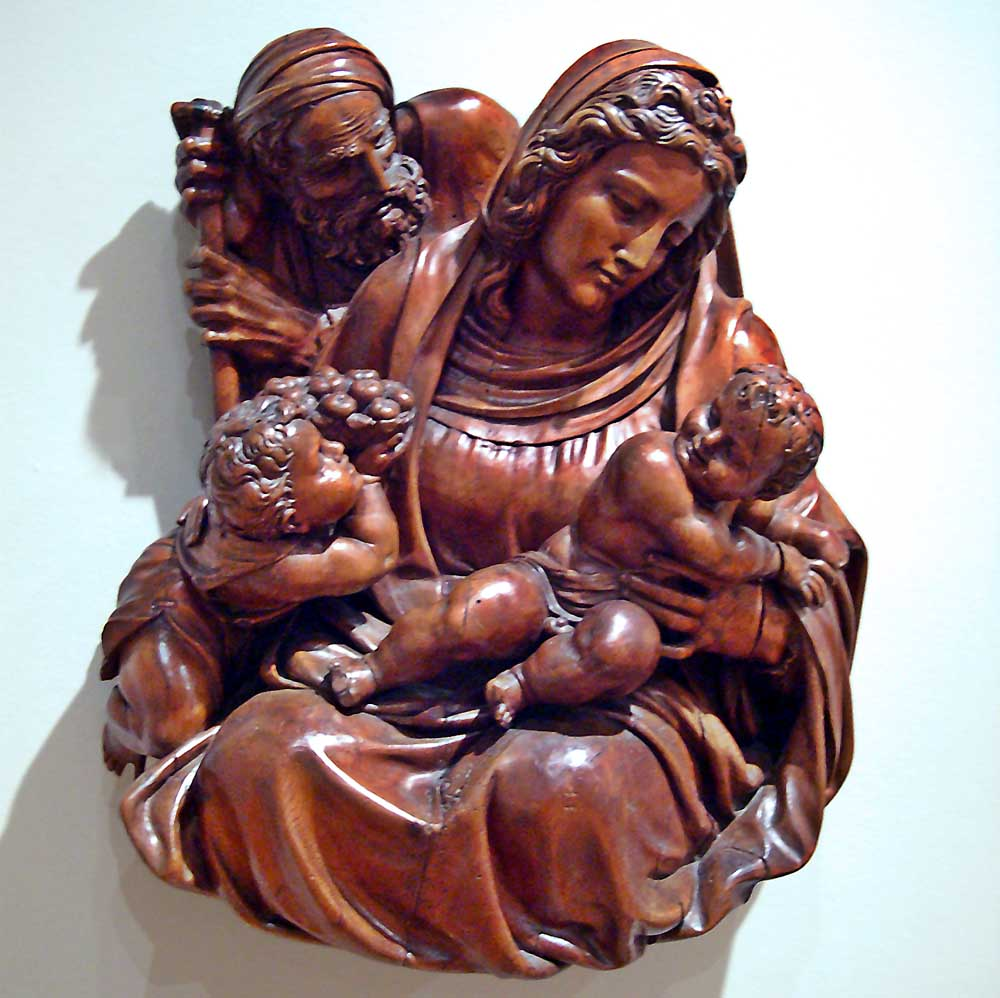
Sagrada Familia (Holy Family), by Diego de Siloé, now in the National Sculpture Museum in Valladolid

The Granadan school of sculpture or Granadine school of sculpture—the tradition of Christian religious sculpture in Granada, Andalusia, Spain—began in the 16th century and constituted a clear tradition of its own by the 17th century. The extraordinary artistic activity of Renaissance Granada brought artists to that city from various regions of Spain and from other parts of Europe.

The Granadan school began with Diego de Siloé, was developed especially by Pablo de Rojas, and culminated with Alonso Cano.

== 15th and 16th centuries ==
Gothic sculptures were brought to Granada in the era of the Catholic Monarchs Ferdinand and Isabella. Although these were objects of devotion, they did not begin a local tradition of sculpture. Rather, it was in the era of the Holy Roman Emperor Charles V (Charles I of Spain) that an initial nucleus of sculptors came together to work on sculptures for the Capilla Real. The tomb of the Catholic Monarchs was the work of Italian sculptor Domenico Fancelli; the tomb of Joanna of Castile and Philip I of Castile the work of Bartolomé Ordóñez; the great altarpiece was by Felipe Bigarny and pieces such as the Incarnation and the Entombment of Christ-now in the Museum-by Jacopo Torni of Florence. All are masterworks, all were innovative in their time, but they do not represent any one particular style. More of a focus would come from the immense output of Diego de Siloé, especially in the Monastery of St. Jerome and the Granada Cathedral; and also in the decoration of the Palace of Charles V; among the artists involved in decorating the Palace were Nicolao de Carte and his student Juan de Orea, as well as the Fleming Antonio de Leval. De Orea, in particular, brought together a vigorous realism with an Italian sense of composition and movement.

Of all of these artists it was Siloé who, not only because he remained based in Granada but also by the power and variety of his art, came to attract and create a group of followers that came to constitute a local school. The most faithful continuation of his work was by Diego de Aranda, but more personal notes were struck by Baltasar de Arce and Diego de Pesquera. De Arco's Christ at the Pillar in the church of the Hospitallers shows violently concentrated movement typical of the mannerist style, but with a pre-Baroque expressive intensity. He brought more brio and grandiosity to the central figure of the fragmentary main altarpiece of the church of San Cristóbal.

Pesquera, who Manuel Gómez Moreno believed may have learned his art in Rome, came to work with Siloé, providing details within the work of the latter, bringing a finesse to expressions of tenderness and of fainting. A particularly notable example of this can be seen in the figures of Virtues in the chapter house in the Cathedral. After Granada, Pesquera went on to Seville; after 1580 nothing is known of his fate.

== 17th century ==
Pablo de Rojas is said to have studied under Rodrigo Moreno, who sculpted a Crucifixion for Philip II. De Rojas settled in Granada, where one of his apprentices was Juan Martínez Montañés, who would go on to be the most important figure of the Sevillian school of sculpture. These artists mark the beginning of a new era in Andalusian imagery.

Among de Rojas's notable work was an expansion of the altarpiece of the Monastery of St. Jerome, where his collaborators included Martín de Aranda and Bernabé de Gaviria. The former carried out some of de Rojas's designs in a workmanlike, if uninspired manner; the latter showed more of a style of his own, bringing a Baroque brio and dynamism. From Gómez Moreno we know some dates of de Rojas's activity between 1603 and 1622, when he died. Among his surviving work, particularly notable is the colossal Apostolate in gilded wood—completed in 1614—in the main chapel of the Cathedral. The ten figures he sculpted are distinguished for the grand courage and dynamism of their gestures and attitudes, which in some cases show a violently mannerist complexity, and in others a Baroque impetuousness of movement.

Among de Rojas's famous contemporaries were the brothers Miguel and Jerónimo García who, outside the life of the ateliers, worked together and were famous by 1600, especially for their clay sculptures. Among the works attributed to them are several outstanding and varied Ecce Homos, all executed with careful technique and deep emotion. Some of these are quite small, finely modeled, and polychromatic; in contrast, one the charterhouse is larger than life, combining noble, muscular forms with well-observed, realistic detail, fitting for popular devotion. Similar to this last, and thus attributed to the brothers, is the Crucifixion in the sacristy of the Granada Cathedral, which strongly influenced Montañés's Cristo de la Clemencia in the sacristy of the Seville Cathedral.

With echoes of these artists, but with a direct and strong link to the art of de Rojas, the sculptor Alonso de Mena, was a naturalistic observer, albeit his was an external realism of static, impassive gestures. He lived until 1646, and his studio was the center of Granadan artistic activity, with his son Pedro, Bernardo de Mora and Pedro Roldán. These and several less talented others continued the studio and the style after Alonso de Mena's death, until the return of Alonso Cano in Granada in 1652 brought a new impulse, imposing a new style on the entire school of Granada. Pedro de Mena evolved into this new style, while maintaining a vigorous personal note of intense realism. José de Mora, son of Bernardo de Mora also distinguished himself for a subtlety of expression approaching mystical reverie. The work of his brother Diego de Mora, on the other hand, was more superficial and decorative. The art of Jose Risueño flows with brio, showing the influence of Cano and of the direct study of nature, giving a note of sober realism, but also a sensibility open to grace and delicate beauty.

The Baroque continued powerfully in Granada in all of the arts and letters, and the studio of Diego de Mora brought forth other sculptors who continued in that style. One example is Torcuato Ruiz del Peral, born in 1708 in a small village near Guadix. After apprenticing with Diego de Mora, by 1737 Ruiz had a studio of his own.

Independent of the echoes of the Italian Baroque and the French Rococo, the sculptors of Granada, especially José de Mora sought new compositional and expressive effects bringing together the smoothness of faces, the vigorous movement of large folds of cloth and a violent polychrome. This can best be seen in the processional image of the Virgen de las Angustias ("Virgin of Sorrows") of Santa María de la Alhambra, but it was also visible in the small figures of the choir stalls of the Guadix Cathedral, destroyed in 1936. Another fine example of this style is San José con el Niño de la mano ("Saint Joseph with the Christ Child in his hand") in the parish church of Guadix. The studio of José de Mora continued to be very active until his death in 1773.

From this same studio, Agustín de Vera Moreno shows less of an individual touch, but had some quite successful pieces, above all the sculptures of Saint Joseph in the Carmelite Monastery of Granada. He is particularly noted for his wood sculptures, as can be seen in the Iglesia del Sagrario and the retrochoir of the Cathedral. He died in 1760.

In the era of Ruiz del Peral and Vera Moreno, many other sculptors were active in Granada, working in a similar style but with less individual personality in their art. These include Juan José Salazar, Ramiro Ponce de León, Pedro Tomás Valero, and Martín José Santisteban. Quite distinct from these is the highly cultured work of painter and sculptor Diego Sánchez Sarabia, an academic of the Real Academia de Bellas Artes de San Fernando.

Pedro Duque de Cornejo, from Córdoba worked in Granada between 1714 and 1718, producing several notable works, but his vigorous art, with its baroque Italian showiness, had little influence on the sculptors of the school of Granada. Nor were the Granadans particularly influenced by the arrival in 1780 of the French sculptor Miguel Verdiguier, who worked in the Cathedral on the reliefs of the façade and the chapel of Saint Cecil, with a style that marked the passage from the rococo to the neoclassical. Even less was there any significant influence from the neoclassical sculptor Juan de Adán, who worked on the Cathedral and had one Granadan apprentice, Pedro Antonio Hermoso; nor, after de Adán, the Catalan Jaime Folch Costa.

The Granadan school continued with modestly important artists following Ruiz del Peral. Among the most notable was Felipe González, whose works link to those of his son Manuel González; the latter lived into the mid-19th century and is responsible for such works as Niño Nazareno in the Convento de los Ángeles and Soledad in the Church of San Domingo, both of which were once thought to be mid-18th century works. His work marked a return to the style of Cano and his disciples, a tendency that continued in Francisco Morales and Fernando Marín, who sculpted in clay in the mid-19th century. Both worked with their families and apprentices, maintaining a clear continuity of the school of Granada to the end of the 19th century. Among their apprentices, Pablo de Loyzaga and, in turn, his apprentice José Navas-Parejo carried the tradition into the 20th century.
