= Anthony Shirley =

English soldier and traveller (1565–1635)

Sir Anthony Shirley
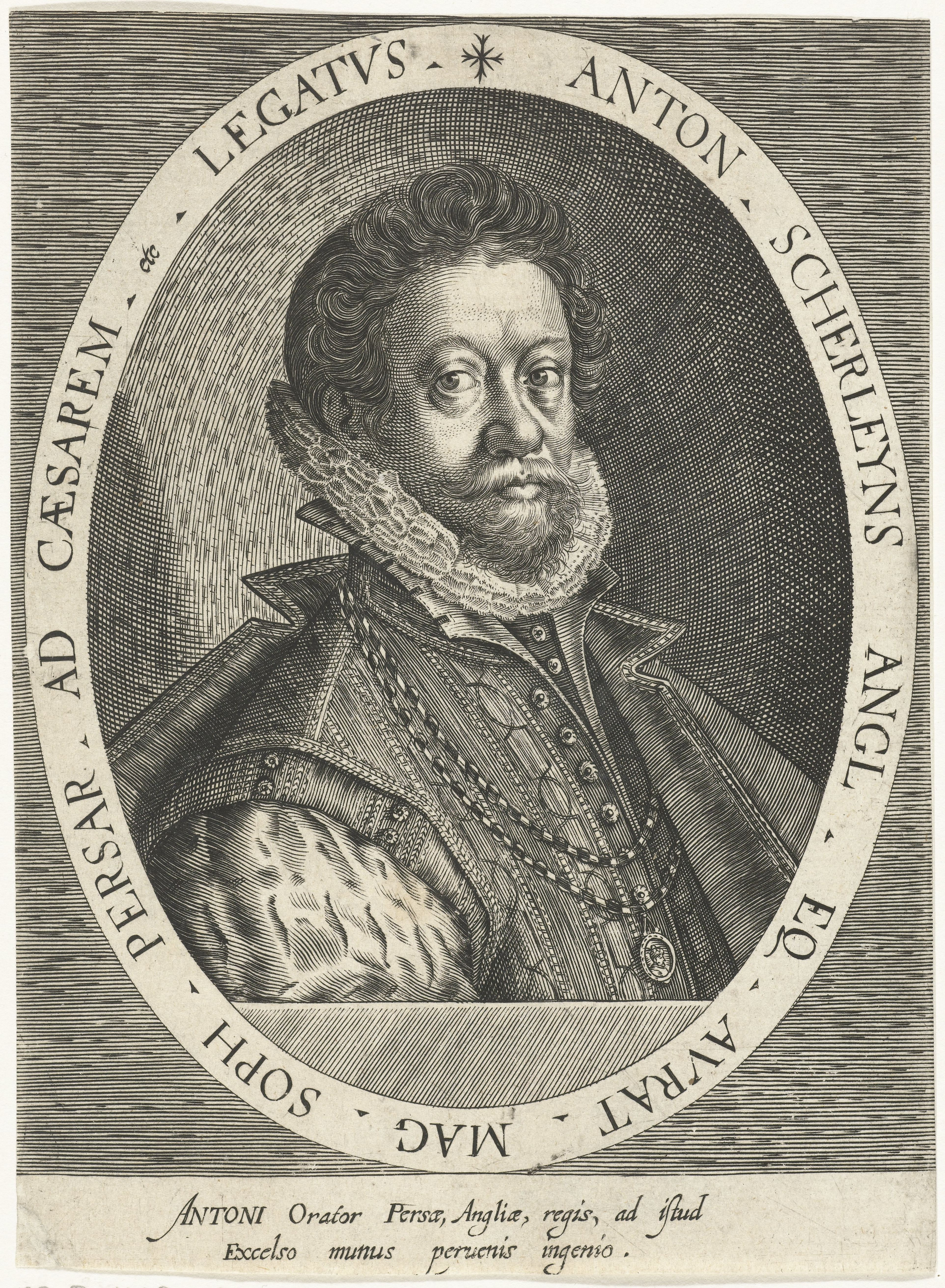
- Engraving of Shirley possibly by Dominicus Custos

Safavid ambassador to Europe
- In office 1599–1601 Serving with Hossein Ali Beg Bayat
- Appointed by: Abbas the Great

Personal details
- Born: 1565 Wiston House, West Sussex, Kingdom of England
- Died: c. 1635 (aged 69–70) Granada, Kingdom of Granada, Crown of Castile
- Resting place: Church of Saint Peter and Saint Paul
- Spouse: Frances Vernon
- Relations: Thomas Shirley (elder brother); Robert Shirley (younger brother)
- Parent: Thomas Shirley
- Education: University of Oxford
- Awards: Order of Saint Michael

Military service
- Allegiance: Kingdom of England (1585-1598); Safavid Iran (1598-1600); Holy Roman Empire (1605-1606); Habsburg Spain (1606-1633)
- Rank: Sergeant major
- Battles/wars: Siege of Zutphen (1591); Battle of Château-Laudran; Siege of Rouen (1591–1592); Islands Voyage

Sir Anthony Shirley (1565 – 1633/1635/1638), also spelled Sherley, was an English adventurer, soldier, diplomat, and political theorist who became a prominent figure in early modern European and Middle Eastern affairs.

Initially rising to prominence through military service under the Earl of Essex, he later led a failed privateering expedition and subsequently entered the service of Shah Abbas of Safavid Iran, becoming one of the first Englishmen to hold an official diplomatic role in Safavid Iran. Over the following decades, Shirley operated as a freelance envoy, spy, and political adviser across Europe and North Africa, offering his services to multiple courts, including the Habsburgs and the Spanish crown, often simultaneously. Though never formally trusted by the English government, he remained in contact with Robert Cecil and other high officials while maintaining parallel allegiances abroad.

A convert to Catholicism, Shirley styled himself "Count of the East" (Spanish: Conde de Leste) and ended his life in Spain, where he authored Peso Político de todo el mundo, an expansive geopolitical treatise assessing the relative strength of global powers. His career, marked by opportunism, shifting loyalties, and diplomatic ambition, reflected the fluid allegiances and imperial rivalries of the early 17th century.

== Early years ==
Anthony Shirley was the second son of Sir Thomas Shirley of Wiston, Sussex, and Anne Kempe, the daughter of Sir Thomas Kempe (d. 7 March 1591) of Olantigh in Wye, Kent. He had an elder brother, Sir Thomas Shirley, and a younger brother, Sir Robert Shirley, and six sisters who survived infancy. At the age of 16, he matriculated as a bachelor at Hart Hall, Oxford. In 1581, he was admitted to All Souls College, Oxford, to pursue a master's degree. Following his university education, he entered the Inns of Court in London, where he gained recognition within aristocratic circles. During this period, he became acquainted with Robert Devereux, 2nd Earl of Essex, a prominent courtier and favourite of Queen Elizabeth I.

== In service of England ==
=== Military career ===
His military apprenticeship began in the Low Countries around 1585–1587, serving with the English forces under notable commanders such as Robert Dudley, Earl of Leicester, during the Dutch Revolt against Spain. He was first posted to port of Brielle but gained recognition for his role in the skirmish outside Zutphen in 1586.

Shirley also claimed to have undertaken a covert diplomatic mission in late 1586 or early 1587 on behalf of Robert Dudley, Earl of Leicester. According to Shirley, Leicester tasked him with delivering two forged letters to Alexander Farnese, Duke of Parma—one purportedly from Mary, Queen of Scots, proposing marriage and a joint claim to the English throne, and the other allegedly from Leicester supporting the plan. Shirley asserted that his delivery of the letters to Parma in Bruges influenced the Spanish commander's hesitation to march north to support the Armada in 1588. However, there is no contemporary corroboration for this claim, and historians have questioned both its plausibility and timing, particularly in light of Mary's execution in February 1587.

Following Leicester's withdrawal from the Netherlands and his death in 1588, Shirley served in the Anglo-French campaign to support Henry IV of France against the Spanish-backed Catholic League. Under the command of Lord Willoughby, he participated in the 1589 expedition, though specific details of his actions remain unclear. Shirley further went to Northern France in 1591, where he held a senior command under Sir John Norris. During the Battle of Château-Laudran, Shirley led a cavalry charge against a force of 500 Spanish horse and 6,000 foot soldiers, reportedly killing a Spanish captain and playing a decisive role in the English response. He also repelled a Spanish counter-attack with only fifteen horsemen, during which his horse was shot from under him.

He was soon granted the rank of colonel by the Earl, took command of 4,000 soldiers. After two years of military service, including participation in the unsuccessful siege of Rouen, in 1593, he was awarded the Order of St Michael by Henry IV of France, acting on the Earl's recommendation. Queen Elizabeth, concerned that the ceremonial oath might have bound him to a Catholic monarch, instructed John Puckering, Speaker of the House of Commons, and Robert Sackville, a university associate of Anthony and fellow member of the Inns of Court, to investigate Shirley. He was interrogated regarding his allegiance to Henry IV, which he denied, and was instructed to renounce the knighthood. He refused, stating through his interrogators that the matter concerned his honour, which he valued above life itself. On 12 March 1594, he was found guilty during trial and, as punishment, was bound to serve there as a prisoner of the Fleet, but was shortly afterwards released after a second trial acquitted him. A compromise was eventually reached: the insignia of the order was returned to France, but Sherley retained the title of “Sir Anthony,” which continued to appear in official records. He was released and resumed his position as colonel of a regiment in Brittany, where he served until 1595.

Around this period, Sherley secretly married Frances Vernon, a cousin of the Earl of Essex. The union strengthened Shirley's ties to the Devereux family and solidified his place within Essex's network of influence. Frances's sister, Elizabeth Vernon, was later married to the Earl of Southampton, a close ally of Essex. The marriage drew further ire from Queen Elizabeth, who barred Shirley from court. He and Frances settled at Englefield, Berkshire, a property purchased from Essex. In a letter to Robert Cecil, Shirley lamented his isolation from court favour. Cecil suspected the marriage had been arranged by Sherley's father, Sir Thomas, who refuted the claim, stating the match was concluded independently by his son while abroad.

=== As privateer ===
In 1595, with backing from his father, he launched a campaign targeting Spanish and Portuguese holdings. The original plan was to seize the island of São Tomé, a Portuguese sugar depot off the West African coast. Sir Thomas purchased nine ships and raised 1,500 men for the project. The financial and administrative burdens of this enterprise were considerable, especially as Sir Thomas's official position was becoming increasingly precarious. To legitimise the expedition, Shirley sought to attach his forces to the forthcoming Anglo-Spanish campaign led by the Earl of Essex and Lord Admiral Charles Howard. Essex secured for him a sub-commission under the broader authority of the Cádiz campaign, allowing Shirley to raise troops and equip ships under Crown sanction. The document named Shirley as commander of all forces funded by himself and his father. Having completed his preparations, Anthony set sail from Southampton on 23 April 1596, with nine ships and one galley. However, this arrangement backfired: upon mustering at Plymouth, Shirley was compelled to surrender four ships and 500 soldiers to the main fleet, compromising his own operational capacity.

Undeterred, Shirley departed in May 1596. The main source for the voyage is an anonymous account in Hakluyt’s Voyages, highly flattering and often questionable. The squadron sailed along the Iberian and West African coasts with little success. Shirley fell seriously ill off Cape Verde, reportedly delivering a farewell speech appointing a successor. Though he recovered, his remaining captains—save for those aboard the Beavis, his own vessel—ultimately deserted and returned to England.

Abandoning the São Tomé plan due to illness and unfavourable geography, Shirley redirected his expedition to the Cape Verde Islands. At Praia, on St Iago, his troops found little to loot. Despite unfavourable odds and a narrow approach, Shirley led an assault that captured the town and lower forts. Anticipating a counter-attack, they fortified the streets. After intense fighting with mounting casualties, Shirley orchestrated a nighttime withdrawal to the ships under cover of naval bombardment. The town was evacuated, and the campaign moved westward. The fleet reached Dominica in the Leeward Islands, where the men recuperated. They then sailed to Jamaica and raided Santiago de la Vega (present-day Spanish Town). English and Spanish sources diverge: Hakluyt depicts peaceful submission and provision of food, while Spanish petitions record looting, arson, and threats against the town's governor. When provisions were refused, Shirley retaliated by burning additional buildings and attempting to arrest the local abbot, who escaped.

In March 1597, the expedition moved to the Bay of Honduras. Unable to take the fortified town of Trujillo, they sacked the poorer settlement of Puerto de Caballos, which yielded nothing. Shirley then launched a speculative journey up Lake Izabal in present-day Guatemala, seeking a route to the Pacific. When this failed, he devised an even more implausible plan: to sail north to Newfoundland, re-supply and recruit, and return via the Straits of Magellan. His men, weary and demoralised, mutinied. On 13 May, the entire fleet deserted him off Havana, leaving Shirley alone aboard the Beavis. Shirley reached Newfoundland with minimal provisions, refitted, and returned to England, arriving at Dover in July 1597. He found his father imprisoned, bankrupt, and stripped of office. Needing to restore the family's position, Shirley joined another naval expedition under Essex, now a national hero after Cádiz. Appointed sergeant major, Shirley became one of the fleet's senior military officers.

Before departure, Essex dispatched him to London with updates for the Queen and Robert Cecil. Letters from both men confirm that Shirley had been restored to royal favour. Essex wrote that he “wonderfully deserve[s] to be cherished,” while Cecil reported that Shirley had been received “with great favour both in the privy and withdrawing chamber.”

=== In Italy ===
Following his return from the failed Islands Voyage, Sir Anthony Shirley became involved in a new, unofficial venture instigated by the Earl of Essex. With his position at court weakened after the naval debacle, Essex sought to influence foreign affairs in a manner detached from direct royal scrutiny. His focus turned to Ferrara, where the succession of Cesare d'Este had become a matter of international dispute following the death of Duke Alfonso II. Spain and the Papacy opposed Cesare's claim on grounds of illegitimacy. Essex, expecting that Spanish involvement in the Ferrara succession might distract them from plans for a renewed invasion of England, dispatched Shirley and a group of experienced captains to intervene covertly. Their brief was to use funds to gain support for Cesare d’Este, while maintaining plausible deniability for the English Crown. Shirley later insisted the mission was not undertaken without Elizabeth's knowledge, although no formal licence was issued.

Shirley did not inform his father of his departure. Sir Thomas Shirley, recently released from prison to raise funds for debts owed to the Crown, had lent his son money on the understanding it would be repaid immediately. When Anthony absconded without notice, leaving the debt unpaid, Sir Thomas wrote bitterly to Robert Cecil accusing his son of deception and cruelty, stating he had been “most vilely handled” and demanding Anthony be detained until the money or pawned jewels were recovered. Accompanied by his 16-year-old brother Robert and a force of 5,000 foot soldiers, Shirley began his journey from Suffolk. The party crossed to Edwardstone where Sir Robert Sidney received them hospitably, unaware of their purpose. Later advancing through Vlissingen, Middelburg, Düsseldorf, Duisburg, Cologne, and Nuremberg. Upon reaching Augsburg, the expedition learned that Cesare d’Este had reached a settlement with the Pope, rendering their original mission in Ferrara obsolete. With no clear objective, the troops became demoralised and followed Shirley to Venice, arriving in spring 1598. There they spent nearly three months, enjoying the city's culture and hospitality. William Parry, one of the group, recorded that the Doge received Shirley with princely courtesy, sending gifts of sweetmeats and wine. George Manwaring confirmed their extended stay in Venice, describing it as a period of leisure and luxury.

An anonymous letter from a French observer, now in the Cecil Papers, criticised Shirley's vanity, his wasteful spending, and his openness to working for foreign powers, including Spain and the Papacy, if well paid. The writer questioned whether Shirley had truly been sent by Essex or was acting independently while living on borrowed funds. Shirley's next project emerged from a chance—or possibly orchestrated—meeting with a multilingual Christian traveller named Michel Angelo Corai, recently returned from Persia. Corai persuaded Shirley of the advantages of visiting Shah Abbas’s court, claiming the Persian ruler was generous to foreigners and hostile to Portuguese influence over eastern trade. The Venetian authorities, keen to disrupt Portuguese control of the trade route via Hormuz, supported the idea and encouraged Shirley’s departure, with the Doge reportedly promising to inform Essex of his approval.

Shirley claimed in his published writings that the voyage to Persia was suggested by Essex himself, though this is contradicted by a letter from Thomas Chaloner, Essex’s agent, who stated that Shirley had tried but failed to secure official employment from the Venetian state before independently deciding on the journey. Chaloner believed Shirley acted from loyalty to Essex but acknowledged that he departed without direct instruction.

== Travel to Iran ==
On 24 May 1598, Sir Anthony Shirley departed from Malamocco near Venice with a party of approximately twenty-six individuals, including his 16-year-old brother Robert on a ship named Nana e Ruzzina for the port of Alexandretta. Most were servants or attendants. Multiple accounts survive, including those by Shirley himself, William Parry, George Manwaring, and a Frenchman, Abel Pinçon who joined the group in Venice and left during their return journey from Russia. Shirley’s own narrative, written years after the fact, is considered to be heavily embellished and introduces fictionalised elements, including invented antagonists such as a Portuguese merchant, Hugo de Potso, who allegedly stalked the party until conveniently dying just before reaching them in Aleppo. Other accounts make no mention of him. While Anthony's text lacks the descriptive vividness of his companions’ journals, he framed his writing as the reflections of a superior gentleman concerned with statecraft rather than anecdotal detail.

The journey began with a sea voyage via Zakinthos alongside Italian merchants. Adverse winds extended the crossing from ten to over twenty days, leading to a food shortage. The Italian passengers refused to help, but Persian travellers provided supplies. During this voyage, a dispute arose when an Italian insulted Queen Elizabeth. Shirley had him severely beaten—fatally, according to one witness—which led to an armed standoff with the Italians. The captain objected to Shirley's conduct, prompting further confrontation. Young Robert Shirley struck the captain, and the parties were only pacified by mediating merchants. Upon arrival in the island, the captain barred the Shirleys’ return to the ship and threatened to fire on them, allegedly at the urging of de Potso.

Stranded in the island, Anthony wrote to Henry Lello, the English ambassador in Constantinople, falsely claiming he was on a mission from the Queen to liaise with a Dutch fleet in the Red Sea. Lello secured for him a safe-conduct through Ottoman territory. The party hired a decrepit Greek fishing vessel to reach Crete, where they were warmly welcomed, particularly by local women. From there, they sailed to Cyprus, under Turkish control, and narrowly escaped arrest after de Potso, again, accused them of piracy and wealth before the Turkish authorities. Warned by Armenian allies, they fled by night to Tripoli, missing their intended landing at Alexandretta. Corai, their guide, who had earlier appealed to the governor of Tripoli on behalf of the group, was arrested shortly thereafter following slanderous accusations by Venetian agents. He was released after a ransom was paid by the group. Travelling onward in a small fishing vessel, the party reached Antioch, where Corai, drawing on his extensive intelligence contacts, arranged lodging for the night through two Hungarian janissaries whom he had known previously. Travelling inland via Antioch, the group reached Aleppo, a major hub for Levantine trade. The travellers were received by Richard Colthurst, the English consul and head of Levant Company which hosted them for five weeks. Shirley claimed to be on a royal mission to challenge Portuguese trade dominance in the East, a story that secured him financial support: a loan of 3,000 dollars, reluctantly granted, and guaranteed by Essex. The funds were used to purchase English cloth and jewellery, which helped them pass as merchants. Shirley obtained a travel pass from the pasha of Aleppo to continue to Baghdad. Just before departure, Shirley received word that de Potso was en route to Aleppo to sabotage him once more. According to Anthony, divine providence intervened: de Potso died four miles outside the city.

The party joined a large caravan to Baghdad, which included merchants, Ottoman officials, and a Florentine named Victorio Speciero. After reaching Bira on the Euphrates, they continued by boat for 23 days, encountering ancient ruins and local customs. At Raqqa, a misfired bullet from a Turkish soldier killed an Ottoman guard. The soldier blamed the English, nearly inciting a massacre, but a bystander revealed the truth, and the crowd executed the real culprit. Along the way, a local potentate seized thirty yards of silver cloth, claiming it as a "loan". Near Baghdad, Shirley ejected two of his men, Robert Browne and William Kydman, accusing them of treason and attempted apostasy. They suffered severe hardships before returning to Aleppo. Shirley demanded their imprisonment and forwarded vague charges to the consul, which were never substantiated.

In Baghdad, the local pasha detained Shirley's group and seized most of their goods at below-market prices. Accused of being imposters rather than merchants, they were forbidden to leave. Meanwhile, the Ottoman authorities issued orders for their arrest. Penniless and at risk of imprisonment, Shirley later described this as the lowest point of the expedition. In response, on 4 November, the group was clandestinely transferred into Safavid territory by Victorio Speciero, a Florentine merchant who claimed he was en route to China. Speciero, likely associated with Grand Duke Ferdinando I of Tuscany’s intelligence network in the Ottoman Empire, played a critical role in securing their escape. Corai, with his own access to regional espionage channels, was presumably aware of Speciero's affiliations and the broader implications of this intervention.

== In service of Safavids ==
Following their arrival in Astarabad on 27 November 1598, the English group split temporarily as John Ward, Abel Pinçon, and Corai travelled ahead to Qazvin to secure accommodation. Sir Anthony Shirley arrived soon after, requesting to remain in the city discreetly. However, Corai had already informed the Safavid court, and according to Manwaring's memoirs, the group was unexpectedly welcomed by Marjan Bey, steward of the Shah. According to Oruj bey Bayat, Shirley introduced himself as a kinsman of King James of Scotland. Marjan Bey informed them that Shah Abbas was engaged in a campaign against the Uzbeks and, until his return, the palace would provide them with 20 pounds of gold per day.

By this time, Shah Abbas had decided to relocate his capital from Qazvin to Isfahan and had already begun major infrastructure projects in the new capital. His return route from the front passed through Qazvin. After a triumphant parade celebrating his victory over the Uzbeks, the Shah formally received the English visitors and bestowed on Shirley the title Mirza Antonio. On 25 January 1599, Shah Abbas entered Isfahan, where he wintered. There, discussions began regarding the possibility of a diplomatic mission to Europe to form an alliance against the Ottoman Empire. Shirley and Corai provided intelligence on European political developments. The proposal met a divided reception. Grand Vizier Hatam Bey Ordubadi presented a rebuttal. He cited Persia's lack of artillery and funds, and accused the Shirley brothers of provoking Persia into conflict for foreign interests. Instead, he suggested a campaign against the Portuguese in Hormuz. In response, Allahverdi Khan Undiladze delivered a robust defence of Shirley's motives, stating the Englishman had journeyed far, drawn by the Shah's reputation, and should be trusted. He acknowledged Persia's current limitations but urged immediate preparations, warning that delay would favour the Ottomans. As for Hormuz, he argued that a campaign there would be logistically impractical due to inhospitable terrain and a lack of naval capacity. Shah Abbas gave no final judgement but praised Shirley's sincerity. However, the peace faction acted swiftly; Grand Vizier held a second audience that evening and appears to have persuaded the Shah to drop the idea. Shirley later noted that Abbas avoided the subject and that Allahverdi Khan appeared to fall from favour. According to Allahqulu beg Qajar, qorchibashi (head of the royal guard), Hatam Bey objected in principle to any alliance with Christian powers.

While the court remained undecided, the arrival of Mehmed Agha, the new Ottoman ambassador, shifted the balance. Mehmed III demanded the Shah send his son as a hostage to the Porte, restore Khorasan to the Uzbeks, and return 10,000 families who had fled Ottoman territory into Persia. In response, Abbas had the ambassador's beard and moustache shaved and sent him back in disgrace. The Shah's decision to pursue the embassy was now sealed. According to his own account “because you have been the mover and persuader of this business,” the Shah told him, “you shall also be the actor of it.” Shirley accepted the offer, requesting a Persian nobleman accompany him. Abbas agreed, appointing Hossein Ali Beg.

The following month was spent preparing the embassy. The final embassy consisted of around 24 individuals, excluding servants. Of the original English group, seven were selected, but Robert Shirley was left behind, likely as a guarantee of Anthony's return. Abbas pledged to treat him as a son, and Robert reportedly accepted the arrangement without complaint. Shortly before departure, an unexpected visitor arrived: an Augustinian friar, Nicolas de Melo and a Japanese convert. Melo managed to join this diplomatic mission, carrying letters from the Shah to both the Pope and King Philip III of Spain. He sent informative letters to Antonio Fernández de Córdoba y Cardona (Spanish ambassador in Papal States) via Michel Angelo Corai. Shirley viewed Melo as an asset, given his position and connections to the Spanish crown. Shah Abbas, who entrusted the priest with embassies in Spain and Rome, inadvertently undermined the embassy's work. He was unfamiliar with European diplomatic practice, and when he presented credentials to the ambassadors, he made no distinction between who was the main ambassador. Shirley would later compete with Melo for the role. As a result, the relationship between the two quickly deteriorated, allegedly due to Sherley's coveting of Melo's wealth, which included a significant sum of money and precious diamonds entrusted to him during the journey.

=== In Russia ===
The group travelled north to the Caspian Sea, where they awaited the arrival of Hossein Ali Beg, a Turcoman nobleman designated as ambassador. They then embarked on a sea voyage, which Pinçon described as hazardous due to the incompetence of the crew and frequent storms. Upon reaching the mouth of the Volga River after two months, they were received by Russian soldiers and transported to Astrakhan. After a two-week delay for instructions from Moscow, they continued their journey to the Russian capital, arriving in September 1599. Here, Shirley reportedly felt emboldened to act against Melo, believing that the Portuguese friar had less influence under Russian rule. Shirley had Melo imprisoned, confiscating his letters and possessions. According to various accounts, including that of Don Juan of Persia, Shirley attempted to kill Melo multiple times during their journey down the Volga River, but the friar was saved by the intervention of Safavid officials who had befriended him.

In Moscow, Melo was placed under arrest again, and Sherley accused him of various crimes. Shirley accuses Melo of violating Christian morals in his memoirs, even claiming that he slept with prostitutes while in Isfahan. According to Arnulf Hartmann, these were defamatory rumors spread by an Armenian priest who was translating for Melo in Hormuz and wanted to be a member of the embassy. During interrogations by Russian officials, Shirley allegedly struck Melo, further solidifying his hostile intent. Despite these actions, Melo continued to conduct his religious duties, including baptizing Lucia - the daughter (or granddaughter) of a Milanese doctor called Paolo Cittadini in Catholic rites which led to his eventual arrest. Cittadini was a personal physician to Feodor I of Russia.

Shirley, who remained under virtual house arrest in Moscow, composed two significant letters during his confinement. The first, dated 12 February 1600, was addressed to Anthony Bacon and a key figure in the intelligence network surrounding Earl of Essex. In the letter, Shirley proposed that England could establish a commercial route to the Mughal Empire in India via Russia. The second letter, written on 10 June 1600 from Arkhangelsk, was directed to Robert Cecil and a principal political rival of Essex. In this correspondence, Shirley expressed frustration that Huseyn Ali Beg intended to proceed to the Holy Roman Empire, bypassing coordinated efforts. Shirley also relayed that Tsar Boris Godunov was seeking a suitable husband for his daughter, Xenia Borisovna and suggested that the English royal family might provide such a match. On 17 October 1600, Cecil responded in a letter to Henry Lello, the English ambassador in Constantinople. He reported that Queen Elizabeth was angered by Shirley's unauthorised assumption of ambassadorial status and dismissed Shirley's claims of a viable trade route from China to England via the Caspian Sea, remarking that only fools would believe such a proposal. Cecil also noted that Shirley would not be readmitted to England, citing the danger his diplomatic initiatives posed to English-Ottoman trade.

=== In Holy Roman Empire ===
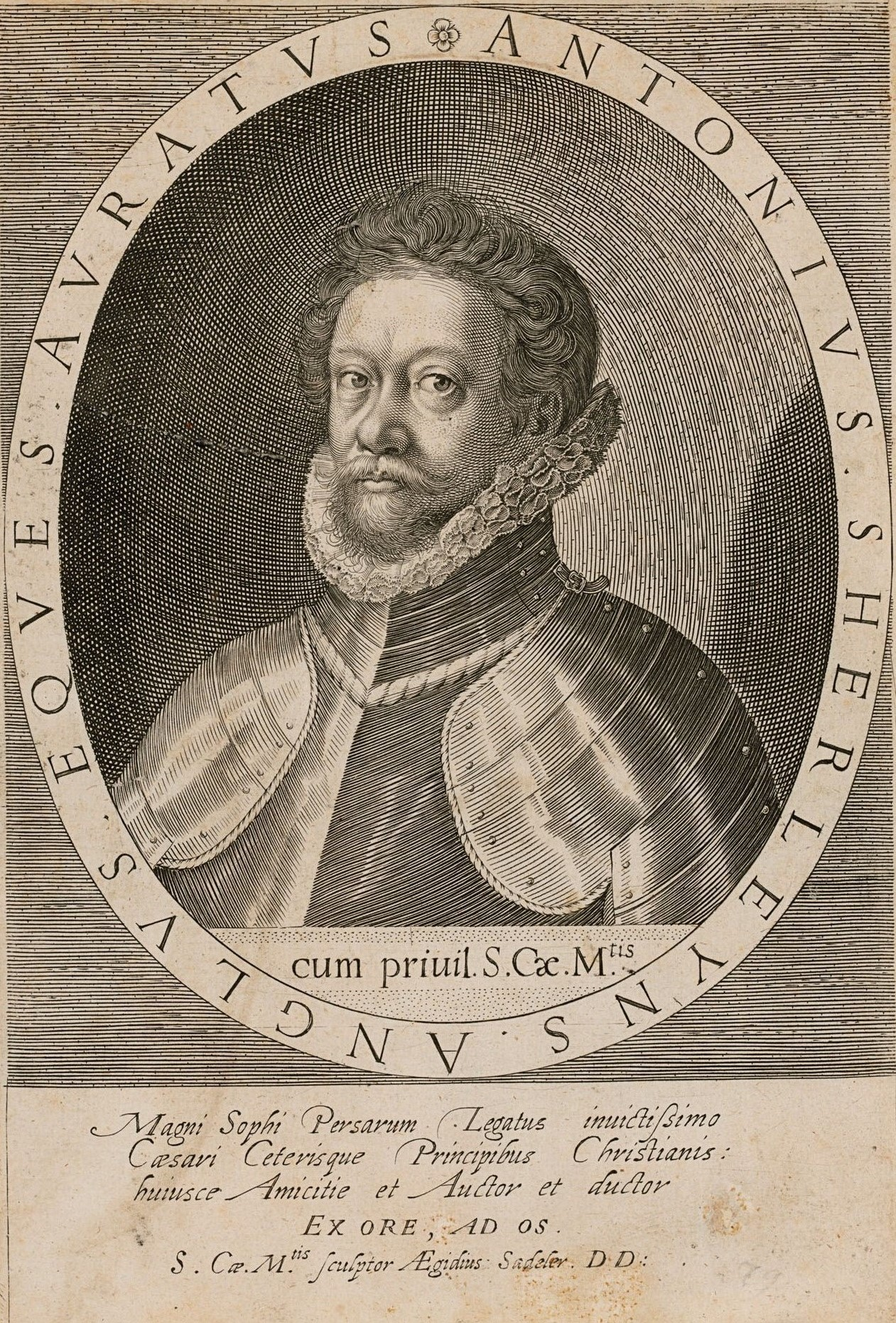
Portrait of Anthony Shirley by Aegidius Sadeler, 1601

The embassy then came from Arkhangelsk via the Norwegian coast to Stade, a Hanseatic city at the mouth of the Elbe River. Here William Parry, Shirley's secretary, left them and returned to England. Parry would later publish his own memoirs, A New and Large Discourse of the Travels of Anthony Sherley, Kt., in 1601. Embassy later departed for Emden in August, where the group was received by Enno III of East Frisia. From there, they travelled via Aurich, Friedeburg, and Neuenburg to Oldenburg, where they met John VII, Count of Oldenburg. On 14 September, they reached Kassel and were hosted for ten days by Maurice, Landgrave of Hesse-Kassel, who provided extensive hospitality including palace tours and a jousting tournament. After departing Kassel, the embassy travelled through Schmalkalden, Gotha, and Erfurt, reaching Leipzig on 1 October. While the embassy attempted to secure an audience with Christian II of Saxony, the request was ignored, and the party proceeded to Prague.

Upon arrival in Bohemia, the embassy paused briefly in Louny before waiting three days at Modletický House in Slaný. On 10 October, they arrived at the Stella Pavilion near Prague, where the Holy Roman Emperor Rudolf II prepared an elaborate reception. According to Pietro Duodo, the Venetian ambassador, Shirley was perceived as the principal ambassador. Rudolf II sent three hundred mounted citizens and fifteen carriages to receive the delegation. Shirley and Huseyn Ali Bey were then escorted under military guard into Prague and lodged at the “Mad Man” (U Divého muže) hotel.

Shirley was granted an imperial audience only on 7 November. He presented a proposal for an alliance on behalf of Shah Abbas and argued in favour of diverting the spice trade from India through Iran and Russia to Europe, bypassing Portuguese and Ottoman routes. Shirley spoke in Spanish during the meeting and subsequently tried to persuade Venetian diplomats of the viability of the northern trade route, although Duodo found the plan unconvincing, noting that Cecil had also rejected the idea. On 25 December 1600, Shirley met with the Spanish ambassador, Guillen de San Clemente. According to Duodo, Shirley proposed assuming command at the mouth of the Red Sea, offering to pay 200,000 crowns annually, five times the current rate, in exchange for control over Indian Ocean traffic. The Venetian ambassador described the scheme as grand but unfeasible. He also noted that Shirley lacked official credentials designating him as ambassador and that he had incurred 46,000 thalers of debt while in Prague.

By January 1601, Shirley grew increasingly frustrated with delays and hostility, particularly from Dr. Bartholomew Petzen, the imperial interpreter, whom he accused of obstructing his efforts. The Venetian ambassador reported Shirley's threats to bypass Spain and return to Persia via France and England. Despite growing tensions with Huseyn Ali Bey, the two remained formally united. When the embassy finally departed Prague on 15 February 1601, the emperor granted Shirley 2,000 florins and a further 700 florins for travel expenses. Shirley and Ali Bey together received 2,000 thalers’ worth of silver—significantly less than expected. Shirley's personal expenses, his high-profile conduct, and mounting debt continued to draw criticism, but he remained a central figure in the mission's public image.

Rudolf II ordered Flemish engraver Aegidius Sadeler to produce portraits of both ambassadors, Shirley and Huseyn Ali Bey, before the embassy departed Prague for Italy on 5 February 1601. Shirley, still treated as one of the leading envoys, travelled alongside the embassy via Bohemia and Bavaria to Nuremberg, and onward through Franconian towns and Augsburg to Munich. There, Maximilian I, Elector of Bavaria hosted the embassy in his palace and showed Shirley his treasure rooms and ornamental fountains. After three days in Munich, the Elector provided carriages and a chamberlain to accompany the group on their journey south. Embassy then passed through Innsbruck, the Brenner Pass, and Trento before reaching Mantua. He was received favourably by Duke Vincenzo I Gonzaga. Despite Shirley's later claim that no official business had taken place in Mantua, evidence later surfaced that the embassy had held several private meetings with the duke and received valuable gifts.

=== In Italy ===
On the road to Florence, Shirley deliberately distanced himself from Huseyn Ali Bey, galloping ahead from Pratolino to arrive separately in Florence. This action raised suspicions with Ennea Vaini, the Tuscan court official assigned to greet the embassy. Vaini later expressed concern in his report to Ferdinando I de’ Medici that Shirley was deceitful, noting that although Shirley claimed to have avoided other courts, he had in fact visited numerous German princes before reaching Tuscany. Upon arrival in Florence on 16 March 1601, Shirley was housed in the Pitti Palace with rooms allocated opposite those of Huseyn Ali Bey. The next day, he travelled with the embassy to Pisa to meet the duke. By this point, Vaini had confirmed that Anthony Shirley was the brother of Robert Shirley, who had been in Florence years earlier and trained in horsemanship under a court knight.

Duke eventually received the ambassadors at the Medici Palace in Pisa. Shirley received 700 scudi, more than Huseyn Ali Bey, which reflected his personal influence. Shirley also presented the duke with a letter in Italian, purportedly from Shah Abbas. The contents included strategic information about Ottoman forces and Christian minorities in Syria, almost certainly compiled by the Safavid spy Michel Angelo Corai, who had been working with Shirley. While in Pisa, Shirley met Henry Wotton, a former associate from England and fellow member of the Essex intelligence network. Shirley introduced Wotton to Duke Ferdinando, facilitating Wotton's later political activities in Florence.

As the embassy prepared to continue to Rome, Shirley preemptively dispatched a letter to Pope Clement VIII via a knight named Giulio Cesare Caietano. Shortly after, he received word of the execution of his relative and patron, the Earl of Essex. With his main supporter dead and connections in England jeopardised, Shirley attempted to maintain his standing by claiming Shah Abbas had recaptured Tabriz—a fabrication meant to impress Ferdinando. Shirley's presence in the embassy had already drawn negative attention from Queen Elizabeth, who sent an agent to intercept him. According to Venetian ambassador Pietro Duodo, this agent was detained crossing the Moselle in France.

The rivalry between Shirley and Huseyn Ali Bey culminated in a public dispute. While sources differ on whether the confrontation occurred in Siena or Viterbo, it centred on accusations that Shirley had stolen gifts meant for European rulers during their stop in Arkhangelsk. Shirley had previously promised to account for the missing gifts at a later time. On 2 April 1601, Shirley was in Viterbo, from where he wrote a letter to Cardinal Aldobrandini—poorly spelled but written in Italian. The embassy's arrival in Rome was delayed until 5 April due to Shirley's ongoing dispute with Huseyn Ali Bey. A cardinal, unnamed in the sources, mediated between the two and escorted them to Rome. Their ceremonial entry, as recorded by Vatican officials Paolo Alaleone and Giovanni Paolo Mucante, was marked by contention: Shirley insisted on entering centrally on horseback, placing Huseyn Ali to his right and the pope's 14-year-old nephew, Silvestre Aldobrandini, to his left. Antonio Fernández de Córdoba y Cardona's report indicates that this solution was attained by recalling that passing on the right side is a gesture of respect in Safavid Iran.

Once in Rome, Shirley complained that Huseyn Ali had received better accommodations at the Palazzo della Rovere and refused to dine in protest. He was later persuaded by Cardinal Cinzio Aldobrandini to join a shared dinner. Tensions continued, with reports of a physical altercation between Shirley and Huseyn Ali on the palace staircase. Shirley was also accused of falsely claiming that Shah Abbas had addressed a letter to Duke Ferdinando of Tuscany. Meanwhile, Huseyn Ali Bey informed Venetian ambassador Giovanni Mocenigo that Shirley was not a legitimate ambassador, only accompanying the mission at the Shah's request, and warned that Shirley had sent an agent to Venice to solicit funds.

In a formal letter to the pope dated 14 April, Shirley claimed he was the true ambassador and that the documents were with Huseyn Ali only because he had handed them over on the Caspian Sea. He named several witnesses to support his status, including Jesuits and Armenians in Rome, and requested the pope confirm his primacy. Huseyn Ali, in his counterstatement, argued that he had been given sealed state documents and entrusted with significant valuables by the Shah, which Shirley had diverted or failed to deliver. Shirley was further implicated in the case of Nicolas de Melo, imprisoned in Russia—an event Shirley had not reported.

On 25 April, Shirley was received by Pope Clement VIII. Accompanied by Fabio Biondi and Mucante, he kissed the pope's foot and spoke in hushed tones. The pope questioned why a foreigner represented the Shah but accepted it as part of divine providence. On 26 April, Huseyn Ali was received separately in a more elaborate audience that included nobles in addition to cardinals—fuel for reports that he was now viewed as the official ambassador. During a second audience on 2 May, Shirley continued to advocate for political cooperation with Safavid Iran, presenting Shiism as closer to Christianity than Sunni Islam. He requested papal credentials, funds, and a passport to return to Iran via Naples, Messina, Crete, Tripoli, Damascus and Hormuz. He also requested support for his interpreter, Michel Angelo Corai.

On 4 May, Shirley met secretly with the Tuscan ambassador, seeking assistance for a plan to transport Tuscan engineers to Iran for weapons development. This plan, if realised, would have helped Shah Abbas challenge Portuguese dominance in the Indian Ocean. Shirley then proposed a revised route through Ancona and Ragusa to avoid Spanish interference. Despite papal frustrations with Shirley, he obtained credentials on 17 May and again met the Tuscan ambassador on 20 May, this time at the Medici villa. There he declared his urgency to return to Iran, repeating the engineer proposal and naming Sir Henry Wotton, his former associate and fellow Essex affiliate, as a possible agent. He asked for a letter from the pope to Duke Ferdinando to facilitate the plan.

On 26 May, new intelligence from England indicated Queen Elizabeth was investigating Essex's financing, placing Shirley at further risk. On 27 May, Shirley announced to the French ambassador Cardinal d’Ossat his intention to return to Persia and avoid Spain, France, and England. Having obtained a letter of passage from the Duke of Sessa, the Spanish ambassador, addressed to Portuguese officials, Shirley was declared safe as a converted Catholic. On 28 May, a papal court official gave him 100 crowns and asked him to leave Rome. On 29 May, Shirley left for Ancona. Cardinal d’Ossat reported on 11 June that he had departed Rome leaving unpaid debts, having misled creditors with false promises of reimbursement. By contrast, Huseyn Ali Bey remained in Rome, now fully accepted as the primary Safavid envoy.

From Ancona, Shirley wrote to Cardinal Pietro Aldobrandini on 6 June, naming Giovanni Tommaso Pagliarini, a former papal cupbearer in Prague and Medici network informan, as his emissary. The Spanish viceroy of Naples dispatched a spy, Vincento de Buni, to monitor him. Reports indicated Shirley was in Ragusa with a secretary to the late Earl of Essex, possibly Wotton, awaiting Manuel, Hereditary Prince of Portugal. There were suspicions they intended to travel to Goa to spark rebellion against Spanish-Portuguese rule. By August, however, Shirley was in Zadar and later Fiume, and the Spanish lost interest, concluding he was no longer a threat. Shirley did not proceed to Persia or Russia and instead took up residence in Venice.

== Return to Venice ==
In Venice, Shirley launched into an unstable career as a freelance political operator, offering schemes and intelligence to any power willing to pay. He approached Henry IV, Rudolf II, and James VI of Scotland, while simultaneously continuing correspondence with Robert Cecil in England. Despite these overtures, Cecil regarded him as untrustworthy and had him monitored by intelligence agents Thomas Wilson and Aurelian Townshend. Wilson reported intrusive behaviour by Shirley and claimed he was forced to relocate to avoid him. Townshend, for his part, was outwitted and financially exploited by Shirley. By 1602, Shirley was likely on the payrolls of both the Spanish and Scottish crowns, though amounts and consistency are undocumented. He dabbled in pseudo-scientific ventures, including a silver-refinement scheme with an alchemist. Reports also circulated of assassination attempts on his life, which he attributed to the Ottomans. Wilson, however, dismissed these as accidents or revenge from local creditors.

In 1603, Venice arrested Shirley after he allegedly used armed men to coerce a Persian merchant into selling silk. This, coupled with the notoriety of his brother Thomas Shirley, a known pirate who had attacked Venetian ships, further damaged his standing. During interrogation, Anthony deflected by blaming longstanding family feuds and portrayed himself as a victim of Vavasour family machinations. His credibility was dubious, yet plausible enough that James I, newly enthroned in England, intervened diplomatically. Shirley was released in May 1603, citing poor health and diplomatic pressure.

== In Marrakesh ==
He resumed espionage activities, this time for Emperor Rudolf II, providing intelligence on Ottoman military capabilities via contacts in Constantinople. Venice responded by expelling him in December 1604, forbidding his return under penalty of death. Shirley moved to Ferrara and, in 1605, was recalled to Prague to assist with a new Persian diplomatic mission of Mehdi Qoli Beg. Rudolf elevated Shirley's status, commissioning him as joint ambassador to Morocco on behalf of the Emperor, Philip III of Spain, and James I.

Shirley reached Morocco in July 1605, after a difficult journey via Alicante and Cádiz. In Marrakesh, he was ceremonially welcomed by Abu Faris Abdallah, one of three sons of the late Ahmad al-Mansur who were embroiled in civil war. Shirley was housed near the El Badi Palace and enjoyed initial honours, though an early breach of court protocol nearly caused a diplomatic incident. His flamboyant generosity, distributing turbans to 500 escort soldiers and lavishly rewarding even minor services, earned him popularity but depleted his finances. Despite these efforts, the mission failed. Abu Fares, wary of his brothers and uninterested in new enemies, refused to attack Ottoman forces. Meanwhile, Rudolf ceded Hungarian military affairs to Archduke Matthias, who soon made peace with the Ottomans, rendering Shirley's mission obsolete. He departed Safi in August 1606, heavily indebted, accompanied by two ransomed Portuguese noblemen who reneged on repayment and allegedly attempted to poison him.

== In service of Spain ==
In Madrid, Shirley presented his Moroccan report to Philip III and was received cordially. Despite financial ruin, he managed a grand arrival and proposed various schemes. One was accepted: Shirley was appointed “Captain General of the Mediterranean Sea” and authorised to raise a fleet to defend Spanish interests. He was granted tax-free import privileges to fund the venture, with the aim of recruiting former English privateers. Attempts to enlist pirates Jack Ward and Simon Simonson (Dauncer) failed.

By 1609, Shirley had assembled ships and men in Sicily, with orders not to provoke Ottoman forces. He ignored this, engaging Turkish troops at Skiathos and Lesbos and seizing a Venetian vessel. Spanish authorities halted his command, citing the unauthorised raid and diplomatic fallout. In January 1611, Shirley returned to Spain, was granted a modest pension, and ordered to reside in Granada. Soon after, he learned his brother Robert had arrived in Madrid as ambassador from Shah Abbas, well-received and generously funded. Anthony immediately returned to the capital. Their reunion after more than a decade was initially cordial, but deteriorated rapidly when Robert discovered that Anthony had been plotting with Spanish officials to prevent his return to England. A letter from the King's secretary confirmed Anthony's actions, praising him for his efforts to hinder his brother's departure. Despite this betrayal, Robert managed to leave Madrid. Anthony remained, destitute and living in a bodegón. In 1619, Sir Francis Cottington, the English ambassador in Madrid, observed that Shirley was "a very poor man and much neglected, sometimes like to starve for want of bread," yet, remarkably, still "full of vanity".

Anthony soon returned to Granada, where he lived off a modest Spanish pension. Though largely sidelined, he continued to submit ambitious policy proposals to the Council of State. Among them was a suggestion to obstruct the English East India Company’s activities by scuttling stone-laden ships in Surat’s harbour. He also offered to lead a mission to intercept Walter Raleigh’s 1617 Orinoco expedition. No proposal was accepted. In another, more implausible pitch, he requested control of the island of Capri to convert it into a Mediterranean commercial hub. In 1613, he briefly revived hopes of prosperity through a copper mine near Baeza in the Kingdom of Granada. Cottington noted that Shirley now lived more “orderly” than ever before, supported by an annual income of 3,000 ducats. Nothing further is heard of the mine, suggesting it proved unviable. Later, a Spanish councillor rejected Anthony's request to settle in Spanish America but noted he might still be of use “under a capable leader.”

Throughout his later years, Shirley remained active in policy discussions despite his declining influence. He wrote detailed memoranda attacking English commerce and proposing protectionist policies to revive Spanish industry. He urged action against English and Dutch shipping, including blockading the Straits of Gibraltar—an idea already attempted unsuccessfully by Spain.

In 1626, at the age of 61, he submitted his most ambitious plan: hereditary control of towns on Moroccan islands (Fedala and Mogador) in exchange for 60,000 ducats and a private fleet of 50 ships at Spain's disposal four months per year. The plan never materialised—the guarantee was never paid.

In 1633, a local chronicle in Granada noted his death. The entry inaccurately credited him with sacking Cádiz “against his will,” and said he died “not very prosperously.” He was buried in the parish Church of Saint Peter and Saint Paul. The chronicle added that his son, Diego, was “capable in all matters” and might enter royal service.

== Works ==
Shirley wrote an account of his adventures, Sir Anthony Sherley: his Relation of his Travels into Persia (1613), the original manuscript of which is in the Bodleian Library at Oxford. There are in existence five or more accounts of Shirley's adventures in Persia, and the account of his expedition in 1596 is published in Richard Hakluyt's Voyages and Discoveries (1809–1812). See also The Three Brothers; Travels and Adventures of Sir Anthony, Sir Robert and Sir Thomas Sherley in Persia, Russia, Turkey and Spain (London, 1825); EP Shirley, The Sherley Brothers (1848), and the same writer's Stemmata Shirleiana (1841, again 1873).

In 1622, following the accession of Philip IV, Shirley composed his most ambitious work: Peso Político de todo el mundo, dedicated to Gaspar de Guzmán, Count-Duke of Olivares. Though there is no evidence Olivares read it, the treatise has been recognised as one of the more striking political analyses of the early 17th century. Shirley surveyed the strengths and weaknesses of global powers, integrating economic, military, and strategic considerations. His focus was less ideological than pragmatic, emphasising the concept of “substance”—a nation's self-sufficiency in critical resources. He argued that England's power was overextended, dependent on commerce without the means to sustain it autonomously. Spain, by contrast, had every necessary resource within its empire. Of Safavids, where he had once served as ambassador, he concluded that it lacked naval capacity and self-sufficiency, and that its military success against the Ottomans was temporary and unsustainable. Shirley even proposed an unprecedented strategic alliance between Spain and the Ottoman Empire—depicting Spain as the “sun” and the Ottomans as the “moon” in an astrological metaphor. Only one person, he claimed, had the diplomatic capacity to negotiate such a pact: himself.

Among the nations covered, Shirley's harshest assessments were reserved for Venice and Russia. Of the Russians, he wrote: “false people, with neither law nor word... lying and most cruel,” reflecting the deep hostility he developed after his detention in Moscow. Venice, where he had twice been imprisoned and expelled, was dismissed as a “tyrannical state” masquerading as a republic.

== Legacy ==
The adventures of Anthony Shirley and his brothers captured the public imagination of their time, inspiring a wave of pamphlets and stage plays, most notably The Travels of the Three English Brothers. His encounters even found a faint echo in the works of Shakespeare, attesting to his contemporary notoriety. An unintended but historically significant consequence of his career arose from his imprisonment in Venice in 1603; this event became a catalyst for House of Commons of England to assert its privilege of freedom from arrest for its members, a key moment in the development of parliamentary rights - The Form of Apology and Satisfaction.

== See also ==
- García de Silva Figueroa

== Sources ==
- O'Sullivan, Dan (2021). An Elizabethan Adventurer: The Remarkable Life of Sir Anthony Sherley. Pen and Sword History. ISBN 9781399007450.
- Pennington, Janet (2004). "Sherley, Sir Thomas (c.1542–1612)". Oxford Dictionary of National Biography (online ed.). Oxford University Press. doi:10.1093/ref:odnb/25435. (Subscription, Wikipedia Library access or UK public library membership required.)
- Raiswell, Richard (2004). "Sherley, Sir Thomas (1564–1633/4)". Oxford Dictionary of National Biography (online ed.). Oxford University Press. doi:10.1093/ref:odnb/25436. (Subscription, Wikipedia Library access or UK public library membership required.)
- Raiswell, Richard (2004). "Shirley, Sir Robert, Count Shirley in the papal nobility (c.1581–1628)". Oxford Dictionary of National Biography (online ed.). Oxford University Press. doi:10.1093/ref:odnb/25433. (Subscription, Wikipedia Library access or UK public library membership required.)
- Sherley, Anthony; Ross, E. Denison, eds. (2005). Sir Anthony Sherley and his Persian adventure. The Broadway travellers. London New York: Routledge. ISBN 978-0-415-34486-9.

Attribution
