= Battle of Château-Laudran =

Battle of the French Wars of Religion

- Part of the French Wars of Religion and the Anglo–Spanish War (1585–1604)
Date	11–13 June 1591
Location	Châtelaudren, Brittany, France
Result	Royal/English (Protestant) victory

Belligerents
(Kingdom of France) French Royal Army; England	Catholic League; Spain

Commanders and leaders
Prince de Dombes (England) John Norreys	Duke of Mercœur (Spain) Don Roderigo †

Strength
6,500	7,000

Casualties and losses
50	400 (including 260 captured)

The Battle of Château-Laudran or also known as the Skirmish at Quenelac was a military engagement that took place between 11 and 13 June 1591. Protestant forces of the Royalist French and English led by the Prince de Dombes fought the Catholic League French and Spanish force led by the Duke of Mercœur. The battle took place as part of the French Wars of Religion and the Anglo–Spanish War (1585–1604). Although the two main armies did not commit to a full on fight, vigorous skirmishing forced the Catholic League French and Spanish to retreat from the field.

== Background ==
In 1590 Duke of Mercœur rebelled against the accession to the throne of France of Henry of Navarre and became the head of the Catholic League of Brittany, aiming to restore the autonomy of the former Duchy, and proclaimed protector of the Catholic Church in the region. In May 1591, after the Treaty of Greenwich had been signed by France and England, English forces, which numbered near 4,000, were despatched under Sir Roger Williams and arrived at Dieppe in Normandy to join John Norreys in Brittany. They were to support Henry in an attempt to pacify the Catholic towns who were supported by the Spanish under Juan del Águila.

The Royalist French commander Prince de Dombes entered Brittany and captured the town of Guingamp from French and Spanish forces. On nearing the town of Morlaix, the Prince and John Norreys found that 4,000 Spanish had reinforced the Catholic army under the Duke of Mercouer and were marching towards Morlaix, bringing the number to 6,000 foot and 500 horse. The Prince stayed at Guincamp repairing the town's walls, which had been damaged in their siege. Mercœur then moved against Châtelaudren and the Prince went out to meet him. After a few discussions about prisoner exchange and giving battle, both armies encamped outside the town near Quenelac and the Duke openly vowed a solemn oath to offer battle to the Prince. As soon as he heard he Catholic's league's approach and moved to approach them to make a good place for a battle.

== Battle ==
The next day, the Spanish and French forces arrived and formed a battle formation on top of a hill near the Prince's chosen site. The prince himself, with the advice of John Norreys, formed his men into three battalions, of which the English infantry made two and the cavalry made the third. The Catholic French and Spanish forces responded by drawing their army to the foot of the hill and placing their artillery on both flanks. The Prince marched his men towards them near a heath and on sighting the troops, charged them and drove them back. The Duke then immediately sent 500 French and 200 Spanish to repossess the heath and following behind was the main bulk of their army.

The Prince then sent 300 English to advance and support the forward body; these were commanded by Captain Anthony Wingfield and the cavalry under Captain Anthony Shirley. At the same time, Mercœur sent around 100 musketeers on the left to take a number of houses and a small wood on the edge of the heath, but the Prince then sent 200 Royalists to counter them. The English advanced and at the same time would meet the bulk of Mercœur's army. This was a surprise to Mercœur's army as they thought that this was a reconnaissance in force. Instead, the English attacked, sending the cavalry fleeing, leaving the infantry left in the open where many were killed or captured. The rest tried to flee back to their lines and were eventually driven from the field into the bulk of the Catholic army, who promptly set up defensive positions and then sent out musketeers.

The following day, more skirmishing took place where the French and Spanish infantry sent out musketeers in strength to test the Royalist line. In this counterattack, they were, however, routed by a cavalry charge led by Anthony Shirley, who took many prisoners. In the confused fighting, the French colonel of infantry was captured and the Chief Marshall of the Spaniards, Don Rodrigo, was killed, whilst Shirley had his horse shot from under him.

During the early hours of 13 June, after some light skirmishes and cannonades, Mercœur, being far too cautious, finally retreated with his cannon to Quenelac and the Prince's army held the field.

== Aftermath ==
The Prince had held the field in the possession of the French and English. He realised that a full major battle had been avoided but did not pursue the League Spanish army. The prince too retired to Guincamp and reinforced the garrison as well as strengthening the defences.

Casualties were heavy amongst the Spanish and French forces; 400 were lost, including 60 Spaniards and 200 Frenchmen taken prisoner.

On 26 June, Mercœur, in frustration, disbanded his army for the fruit harvest to avoid disease. 600 of Norreys' troops were transferred to Earl of Essex's force, who took part in Henry IV's unsuccessful attempt to capture Rouen. At the end of February 1592, Norreys returned to England, not setting foot in France for another two years. As a result of his actions, Shirley was knighted by Henry IV, an event which brought upon him the displeasure of Queen Elizabeth I and a short imprisonment.

== Bibliography ==
- Croix, Alain (1993). L'âge d'or de la Bretagne: 1532–1675. Éditions Ouest-France. ISBN 9782737307379.
- Fissel, Mark Charles (2001). English warfare, 1511–1642; Warfare and history. London, UK: Routledge. ISBN 978-0-415-21481-0.
- Harrison, G.B. (2013). An Elizabethan Journal, Volume 1. Routledge. ISBN 9781136355363.
- MacCaffrey, Wallace T. (1994). Elizabeth I: War and Politics, 1588–1603. Princeton University Press. ISBN 9780691036519.
- Nolan, John S. (1997). Sir John Norreys and the Elizabethan Military World. University of Exeter Press. ISBN 9780859895484.
- O'Sullivan, Dan (2021). An Elizabethan Adventurer: The Remarkable Life of Sir Anthony Sherley. Pen and Sword Books. ISBN 9781399007450.
- Wingfield, Jocelyn R. (1993). Virginia's True Founder: Edward-Maria Wingfield and His Times, 1550–c. 1614: the First Biography of the First President of the First Successful English Colony in the New World. Wingfield Family Society. ISBN 9780937543047.
