= Relation of his travels into Persia =

English travelogue by Anthony Shirley

Relation of his travels into Persia is an English travelogue composed in 1610/11 by the English traveller Anthony Shirley, describing the events during his journey in Safavid Iran.

Because the book focused mostly on practical recommendations for Anglo-Iranian relations rather than earlier anthropological or artistic interests, it distinguished itself from earlier English literature about Iran. In order to convey his ideas to courtly recipients, Anthony Shirley offers examinations of the Ottoman and Safavid systems based on his research of classical historians like Livy, Plutarch, and Tacitus as well as 16th-century political philosophers like Francesco Guicciardini and Niccolò Machiavelli.

== Sources ==
- Meshkat, Kurosh (2015). "Relation of his travels into Persia". Christian-Muslim Relations. A Bibliographical History Volume 8. Northern and Eastern Europe (1600-1700). Brill.
