= Church of Saint Peter and Saint Paul (Granada) =

Coordinates: 37°10′43″N 3°35′10″W

- Iglesia de San Pedro y San Pablo
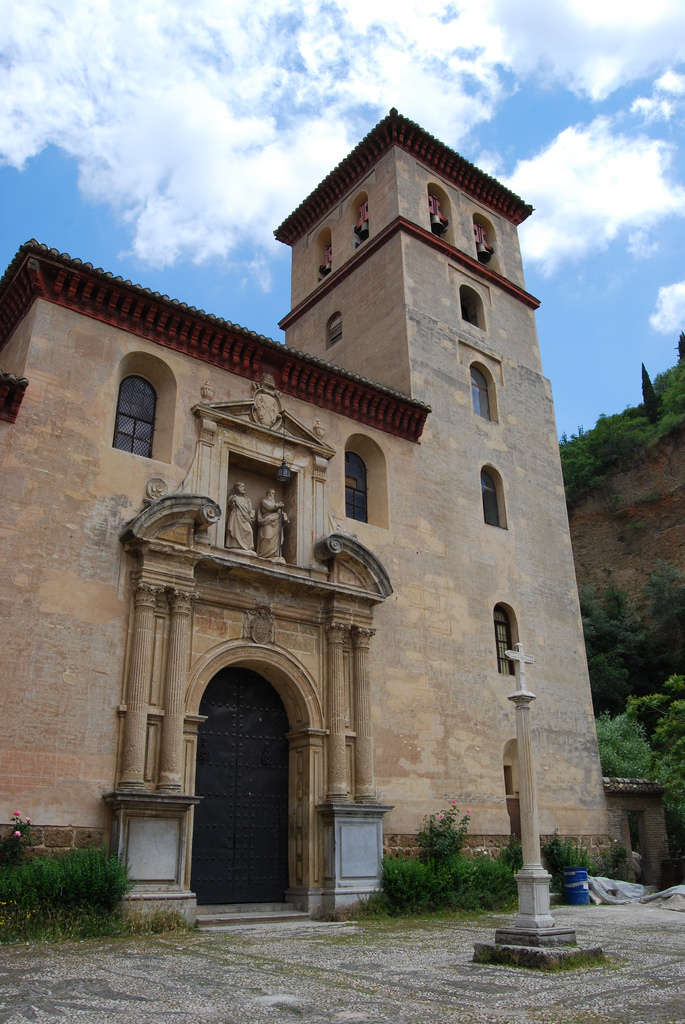

Religion
- Affiliation: Roman Catholic
- Patron: Saint Peter and Saint Paul

Location
- Municipality: Granada
- Country: Spain
- Interactive map of Church of Saint Peter and Saint Paul

Architecture
- Architect: Juan de Maeda
- Style: Mudéjar architecture
- Groundbreaking: 1559
- Completed: 1567
- Spanish Cultural Heritage
- Official name: Iglesia Parroquial de San Pedro y San Pablo
- Type: Non-movable
- Criteria: Monument
- Designated: 13 November 1987
- Reference no.: ARI-51-0005398

The Church of Saint Peter and Saint Paul (Spanish: Iglesia de San Pedro y San Pablo) is a Mudejar-Renaissance Roman Catholic church located in Granada, Andalusia, Spain. It is considered one of the most significant religious buildings of post-Reconquista Granada.

== Construction ==
Construction of the church was carried out under the supervision of Pedro de Solís, based on designs by Juan de Maeda between 1559 and 1567. By 1567, the church was almost entirely completed, except for the tower and the sacristy. In 1590, an explosion at a nearby gunpowder factory caused structural damage, primarily affecting the tower and sacristy, both of which had to be rebuilt.

== Architecture ==
=== Layout ===
The church follows a Latin cross floor plan inscribed within a rectangle—an architectural type linked to post-Tridentine liturgical principles and implemented here for the first time in the province. It comprises a central nave flanked by nine chapels: five on the left side and four on the right. The chapels follow a consistent model, each square in plan, raised slightly above floor level, and separated from the nave by semicircular arches closed with iron grilles.

=== Ceiling and Roofing ===
The nave is covered by a Mudejar timber ceiling (artesonados) with double diagonal braces forming an eight-pointed star in the almizate. The design includes star and cross motifs and gilded muqarnas pinecones. This intricate woodwork was executed by Juan de Vílchez. The transept is marked by a taller and wider space, covered by a 16-panelled roof decorated with large fan motifs and a central muqarnas pendant.

The main chapel, rectangular and elevated on a podium, houses a gilded wooden tabernacle by Francisco Vallejo (17th century). Flanking this are two auxiliary chapels with star-and-cross beam roofs and large square-motif almizates, both featuring circular windows that allow natural light.

=== Choir and Organ ===
At the foot of the nave is the main entrance, leading to an 18th-century wooden screen (cancel) decorated with motifs related to Saint Peter. Above this is a choir loft with a wrought iron balustrade and partially gilded wooden pilasters. Notable features include the recently restored Baroque organ, located above the choir at the church entrance and restored by the Granada Organ Workshop, as well as the tabernacle in the main chapel, originally by Diego de Siloé for Granada Cathedral and relocated here in 1614.

=== Pulpit ===
The church includes a hexagonal pulpit located on the left side of the nave near the transept. Four of its sides are decorated with reliefs of the Evangelists, while the base features an inverted pyramid and a gilded vegetal bulb. The staircase is adorned with geometric and vegetal patterns.

=== Side Chapels ===
The chapels contain various altarpieces and artworks:

- Chapel of Saint Isidore with a Baroque retablo.
- Chapel of the Virgin of Wonders with imagery inspired by the Litany of Loreto.
- Chapel of the Virgin of Fátima.
- Chapel of Saint Joseph.
- Chapel of the Souls (Ánimas).
- Chapel of Saint Rita of Cascia.
- Chapel of the Sacred Heart of Jesus.
- One chapel contains the side entrance, featuring a 19th-century wooden screen and a unique spherical timber ceiling with recessed octagon.

=== Façades and Tower ===
The main façade consists of three descending volumes, culminating in the chapels. The main portal, completed in 1589 by Pedro de Orea, features two architectural tiers. The first includes a semicircular arch flanked by fluted Corinthian columns and topped by a split curved pediment. The second tier holds a niche with statues of Saints Peter and Paul, crowned by a triangular pediment broken by the Papal insignia.

Adjacent to the portal is a three-level tower of decreasing width. Made of brick with rendered surfaces, it has semicircular arch openings in each level. The upper belfry level features eight arches and houses the church bells. The structure is capped with a four-pitched roof and an iron cross. In front of the façade is a small square enclosed by railings, featuring a stone cross with a pedestal made in 1679.

The left side portal, built from Sierra Elvira grey stone between 1566 and 1568 by Sebastián de Lizana, features Corinthian columns and spandrel reliefs attributed to Diego de Pesquera. The church's eastern façade preserves a section of the original Nasrid wall overlooking the River Darro. This side is topped by a statue of the Immaculate Conception from the school of Alonso de Mena. The bell tower, somewhat massive, is visually lightened by the setback of the bell section, the protruding eaves, and above all by its exceptional integration into the surrounding landscape. It visually aligns with the main entrance, offering a striking view of Alhambra and the towers of the Alcazaba.

=== Artworks housed in the church ===
- Local Granada sculpture
- Pietà by Miguel Jerónimo de Cieza
- Works of Saint Francis of Paola by Pedro de Mena
- Crucifixion by Pablo de Rojas
- Christ of the Sentence and Saint Isidore by José de Mora
- Virgin of the Wonders, attributed to Pedro de Mena
- Virgin of Sorrows by Aurelio López Azaustre
- Christ tied to the column, attributed to Pedro Machuca
- Saint Mark and Saint Luke by Juan de Sevilla
- Titular Apostles Saint Peter and Saint Paul by Juan Niño de Guevara
- Portrait of the Bishop of Guadix, Fray Juan de Arauz by Pedro de Raxis
- 16th-century Flemish panel depicting the Flagellation
