= Real Monasterio de Santo Tomás =

Monastery in Ávila, Spain

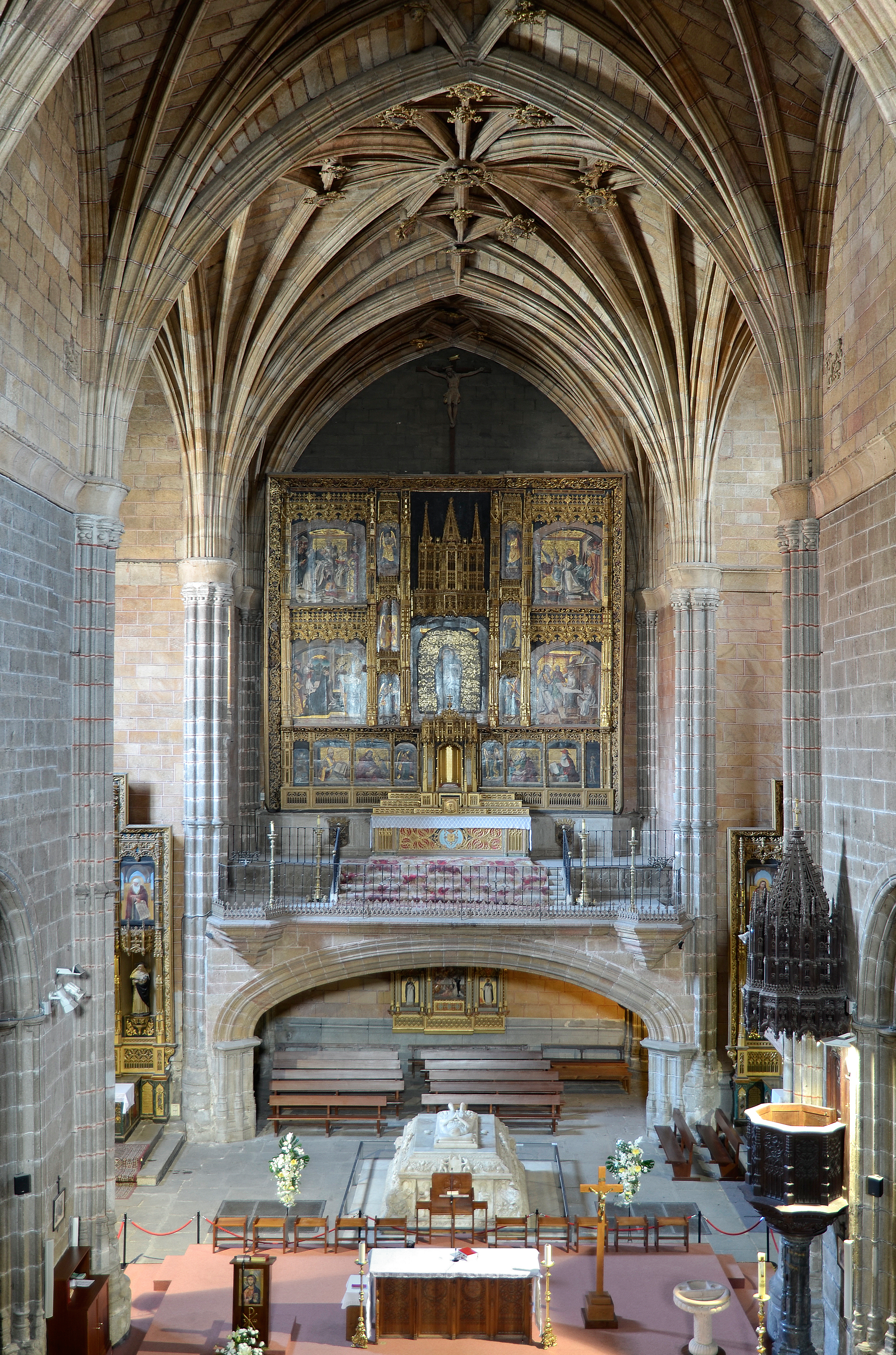
- Interior of the church, facing the altar showing scenes from the life of Thomas Aquinas, below the monument for John, Prince of Asturias

Religion
- Affiliation: Roman Catholic
- Patron: Thomas Aquinas
- Status: Church, museum

Location
- Location: Ávila, Spain
- Interactive map of Real Monasterio de Santo Tomás
- Coordinates: 40°39′0.94″N 4°41′19.86″W

Architecture
- Style: Gothic; Renaissance
- UNESCO World Heritage Site
- Criteria: Cultural: (iii), (iv)
- Designated: 1985 (9th session)
- Parent listing: Old Town of Ávila with its Extra-Muros Churches
- Reference no.: 348-011
- Spanish Cultural Heritage
- Type: Non-movable
- Criteria: Monument
- Designated: 3 June 1931
- Reference no.: RI-51-0000381

Real Monasterio de Santo Tomás (Royal Monastery of St. Thomas) is a monastery of the Catholic Monarchs of Spain in Gothic style in Ávila, Spain. It was founded in 1482, as a Dominican convent to honour Saint Thomas Aquinas (Tomás de Aquino). It became the burial place of John, Prince of Asturias.

Since the 1970s the monastic church has served as a parish church. The site also contains a museum of natural sciences, and a museum of oriental art.

== History ==
The Dominican monastery was commissioned by the Catholic Monarchs, Ferdinand and Isabella, with other funds from the royal treasurer and secretary Hernán Núñez de Arnalte and Tomás de Torquemada, the Grand Inquisitor of the Spanish Inquisition. Building began in 1482 on a site outside the walled city, and was completed already in 1493, led by Martín de Solórzano. The complex has three cloisters:

- the Claustro del Noviciado (Cloister of Novices), of great simplicity
- the Claustro del Silencio (Cloister of Silence) which is decorated with pomegranates as a symbol of the Kingdom of Granada which was incorporated into the kingdom of the Catholic Monarchs, and with symbols of the King and the Dominicans
- the Claustro de los Reyes (Cloister of the Kings), which was intended to provide accommodation for the court, but housed a university of Santo Tomás which was established at the monastery in the 16th century. Today, it houses the Museum of Oriental Art, showing art which Dominican missionaries brought to Spain from their travels in East Asia. Built in Renaissance style, it is decorated with stone balls typical of Ávila, called perlado abulense (Ávila pearl).

The main large polyptych altarpiece in the church was painted by Pedro de Berruguete, showing scenes from the life of Thomas Aquinas. The same artist also painted St Dominic presiding over an Auto da Fe for the monastery: this work is now in the Museo del Prado.

The monastery became the burial place for John, Prince of Asturias, the son of Queen Isabella I of Castile, and King Ferdinand II of Aragon. A marble monument below the main altar was designed by Domenico Fancelli. While the statue of the prince is still Gothic, the ornamented truncated pyramid on which he rests is in Renaissance style. The stalls in the choir are carved from walnut in Gothic style.

== Conservation ==
The monastery was damaged during the Napoleonic invasion, and by fires in 1699 and 1936.

The monastery is protected as part of a World Heritage Site, "Old Town of Avila and its extra muros churches"; the monastery with a defined area of 1.02 ha is listed as one of ten extra muros churches (that is, outside the walled city) included in the site. It is also protected by the Spanish heritage listing Bien de Interés Cultural.

== Gallery ==
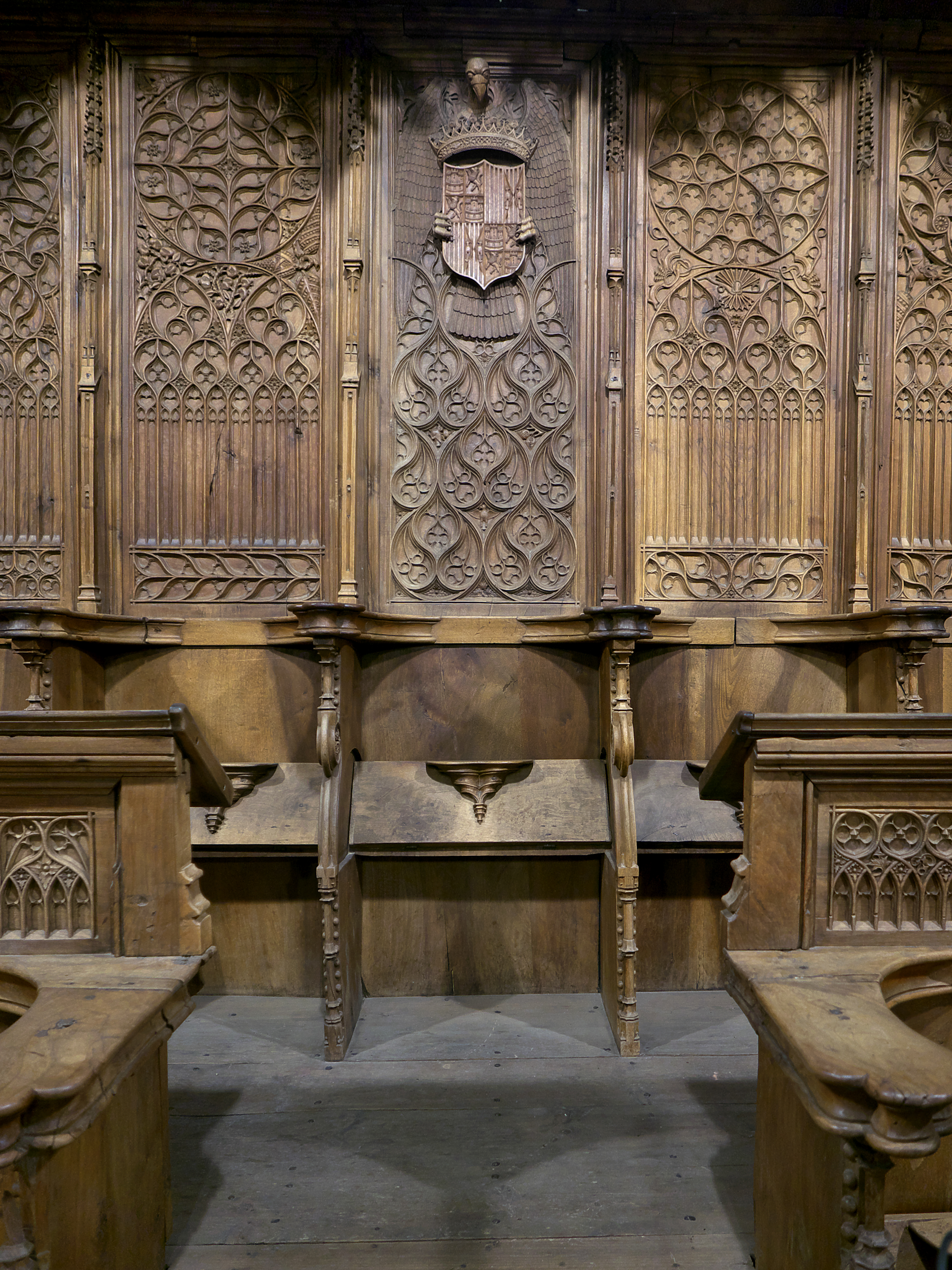
Choir

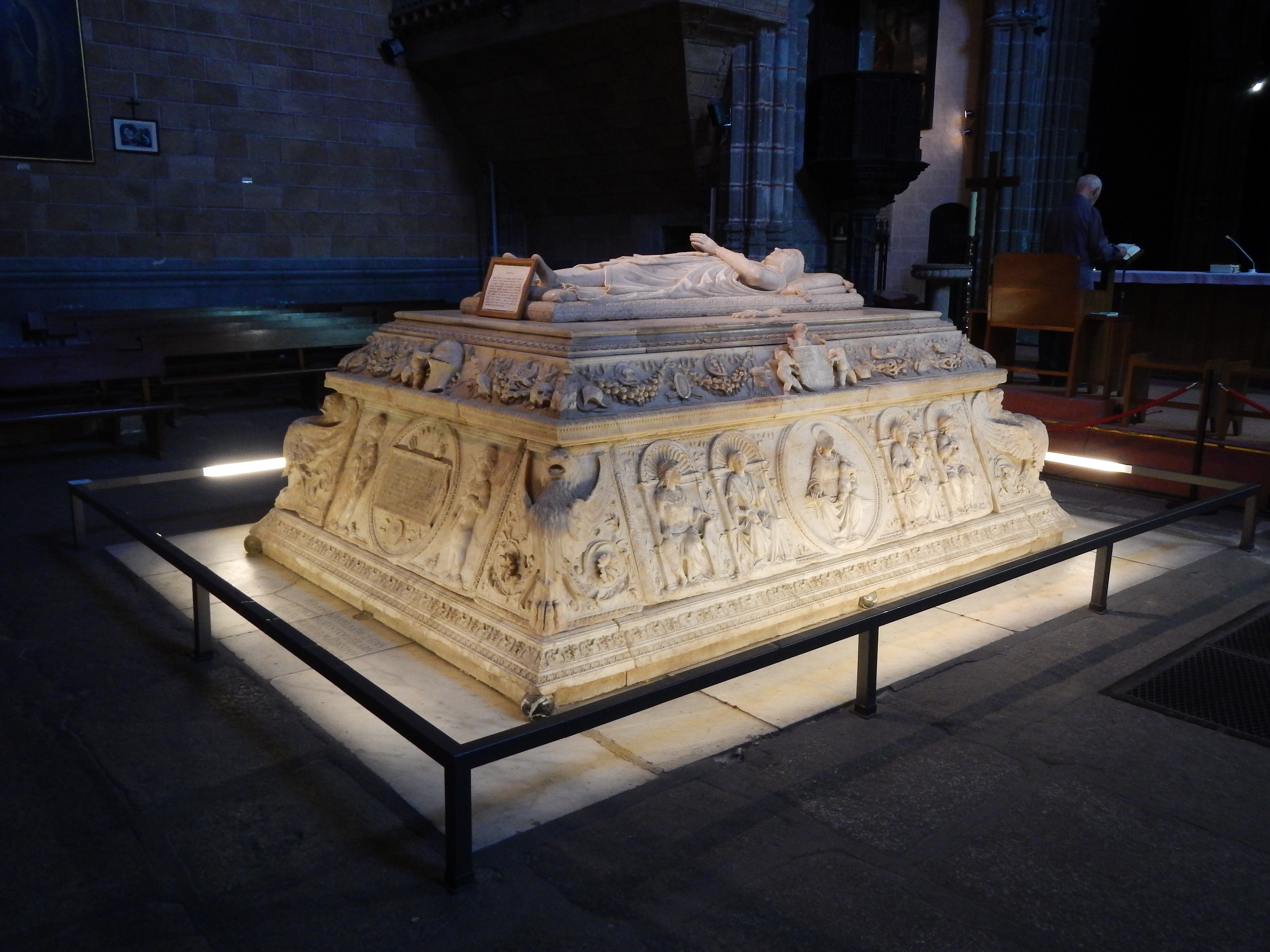
Monument to Prince John

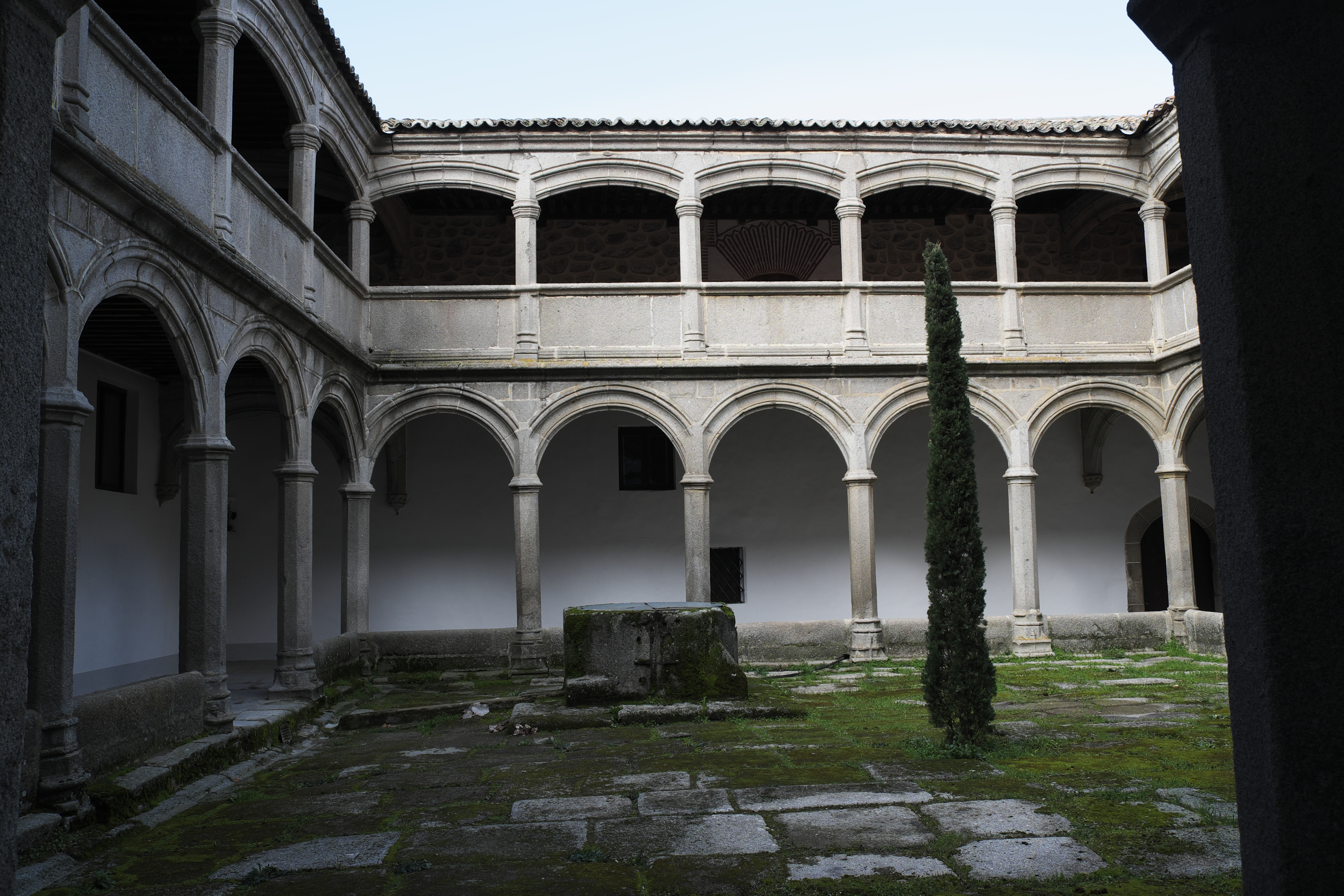
Cloister of the Novitiate

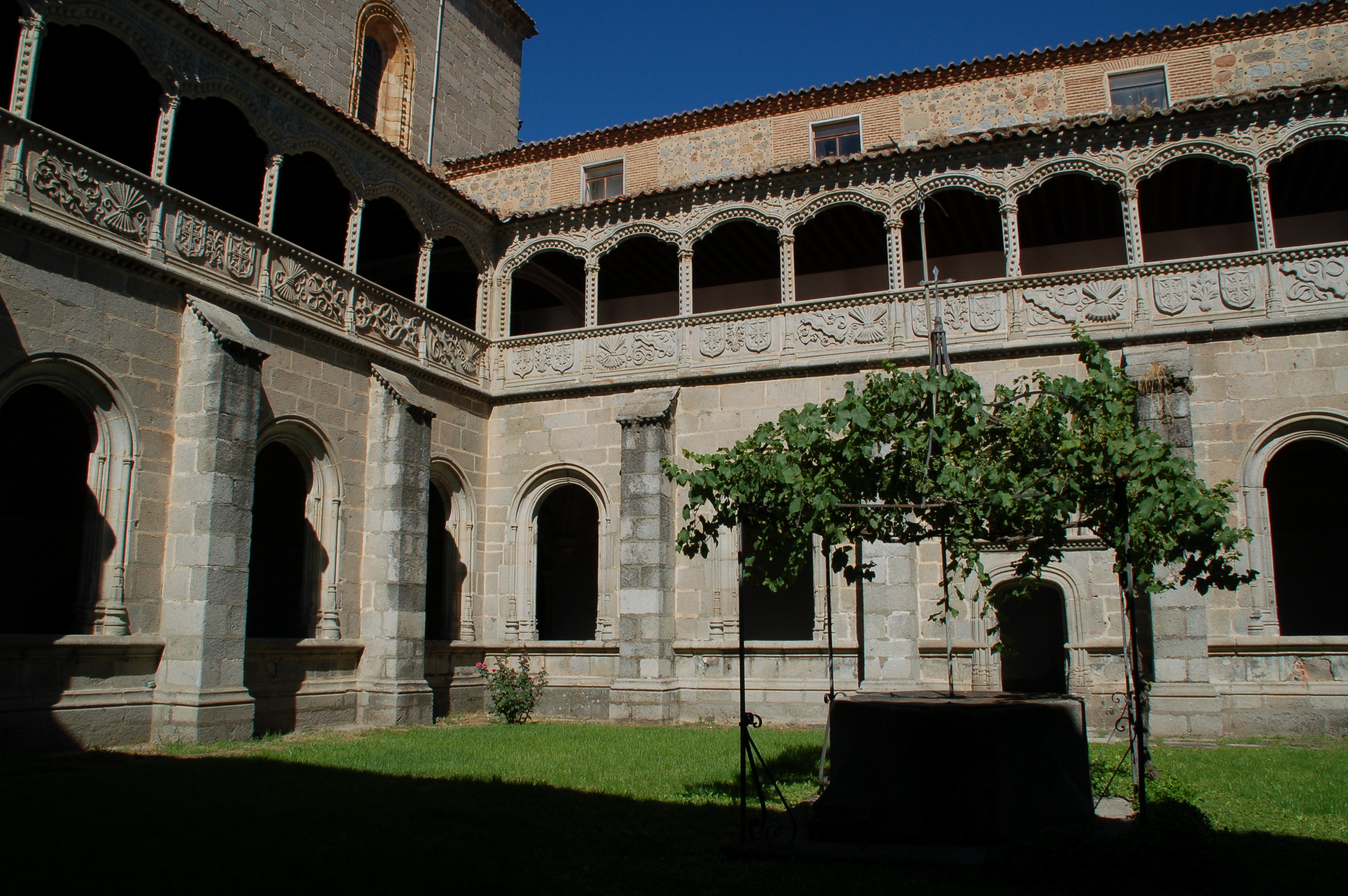
Cloister of Silence

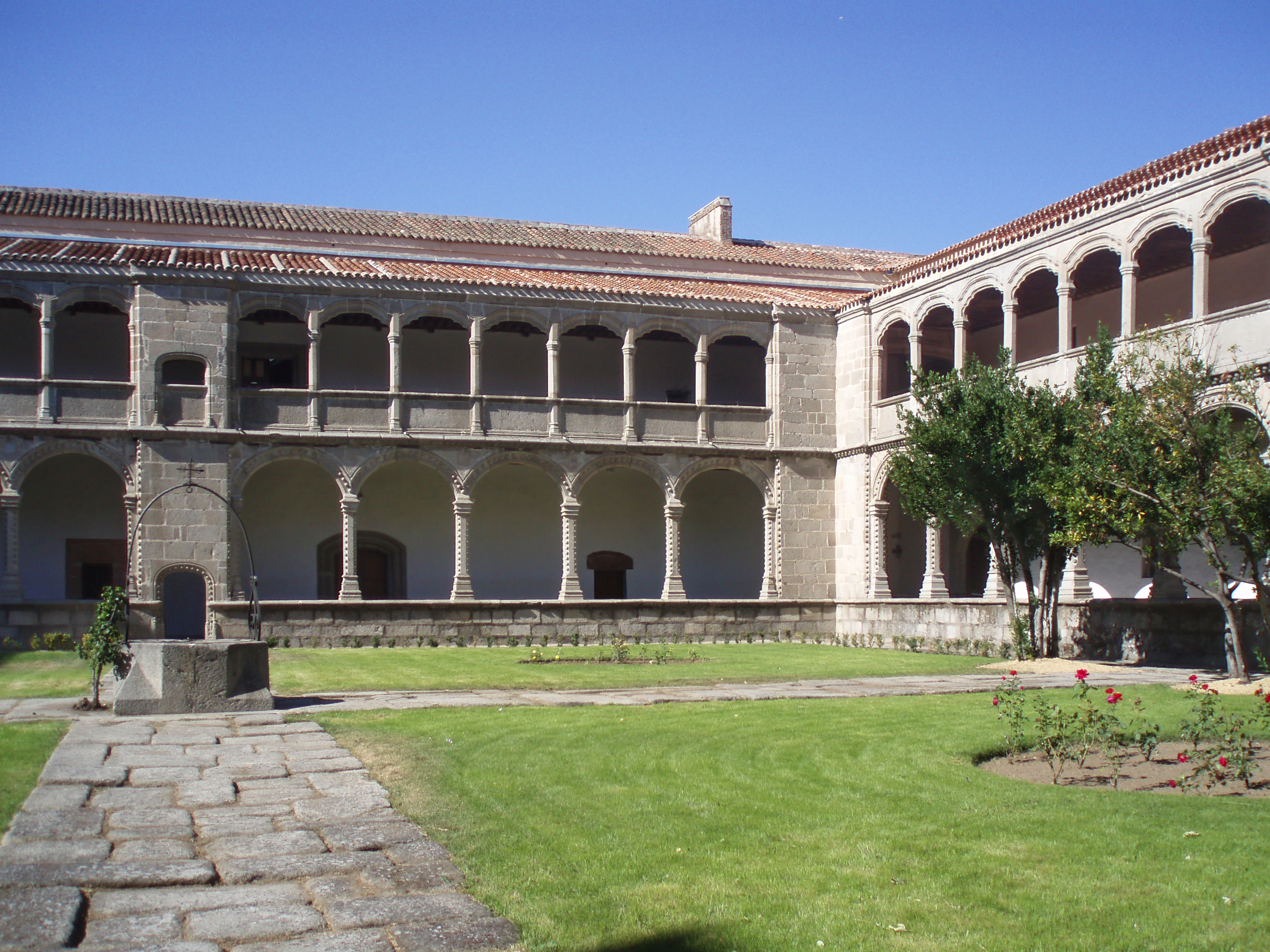
Cloister of the Catholic Monarchs
