= The Form of Apology and Satisfaction =

1604 document against King James I

The Form of Apology and Satisfaction of 1604 was a document drawn up by a House of Commons committee protesting against King James I's handling of recent political issues.

For a variety of reasons King James I had upset many in the House of Commons in his first parliament. These included issues over the Court of Chancery's decision to deny Sir Francis Goodwin's place in the Commons, the imprisonment of Sir Thomas Shirley and his brother Sir Anthony Shirley, and the Bishop of Bristol's book favouring the King's ideas on a union between England and Scotland. The document claimed that James, a foreign king, was ignorant of the Commons' "privileges and liberties" that, the document purported, were their "right and due inheritance, no less than our very lands and goods."

A Commons' committee of more than seventy members was appointed on 1 June, on Sir Thomas Ridgeway's suggestion, to "take a survey of all the Acts and proceedings of the House, which have been excepted unto, or whereof any misinformation hath been given unto his Majesty, from the beginning of the session..." Approximately a fortnight later the committee had drawn up the document "to be presented to his Majesty" and on 20 June Ridgeway presented the draft to the Commons. Francis Bacon, who was a member of the committee, spoke against it. The document met opposition in the Commons, including committee members, and many doubted whether it was wise to present it to the King due to its tone and its claims. Parliament was prorogued on 7 July and the document was not debated again. The clerk requested to transcribe proceedings into the Commons' Journal and copied the document for half a page and left several sheets blank without completing it. The document was never passed by the Commons and therefore would not have been formally presented to the King.

== Historiography ==
Early historians who wrote about this period, like Thomas Carte and David Hume, do not mention this document. In the nineteenth century Whig historians Henry Hallam and Samuel Rawson Gardiner claimed this document was a precursor of the battles between Charles I and Parliament and that from this point onwards the Commons was in near constant conflict with the monarchy until the Glorious Revolution of 1688 settled the conflict over the constitution. Geoffrey Rudolph Elton in 1965 criticised this traditional interpretation of the document by claiming that its viewpoints represented a minority opinion which was rejected by the Commons as being too extreme and that the constitution was much the same as it was under the Tudors.
