= Jose Risueño =

Spanish painter

José Risueño (also written as Josef and Giuseffo) (1665–1721) was a Spanish painter and sculptor of the Baroque period. In addition his being considered part of the Baroque period, Risueño is part of the Granadan school of sculpture. He was mainly active in his native city of Granada. Risueño initially trained with Alonso Cano, under whom he studied both painting and sculpture. Generally, Risueño's works are small in format, with a refined technique that was influenced by works from the Rococo Period of art. In sculpture, his work in clay is best known. Risueño is also noted for his sculptures in wood, which were influenced by Cano as well as the apparent direct study of nature. In painting, his influences included Pedro Atanasio Bocanegra and Juan de Sevilla Romero.

Risueño's mastery developed after 1693 while under the patronage of Archbishop Azcalgorta. He helped decorate the cupola of the chapel in a local Carthusian monastery. His other works include Christ of the convent of Santo Ángel, several sculptures of Child Jesus, the Penitent Magdalene preserved in the Cathedral Museum, the Inmaculada on the altar of the Cathedral of Granada, the Virgin of the Rosary, Saint John the Baptist, and La Dolorosa and Ecce Homo of the Granada Charterhouse. The Victoria and Albert Museum in London houses his Saint Joseph with Child, which has apparent Flemish influence. Risueño's most significant and final work was the set of sixteen figures composing the Altarpiece of San Ildefonso. Risueño died in Granada, in 1721.
