= Royal Chapel of Granada =

Historic 16th-century chapel in Granada, Andalusia, Spain

Coordinates: 37°10′33.55″N 3°35′56.53″W

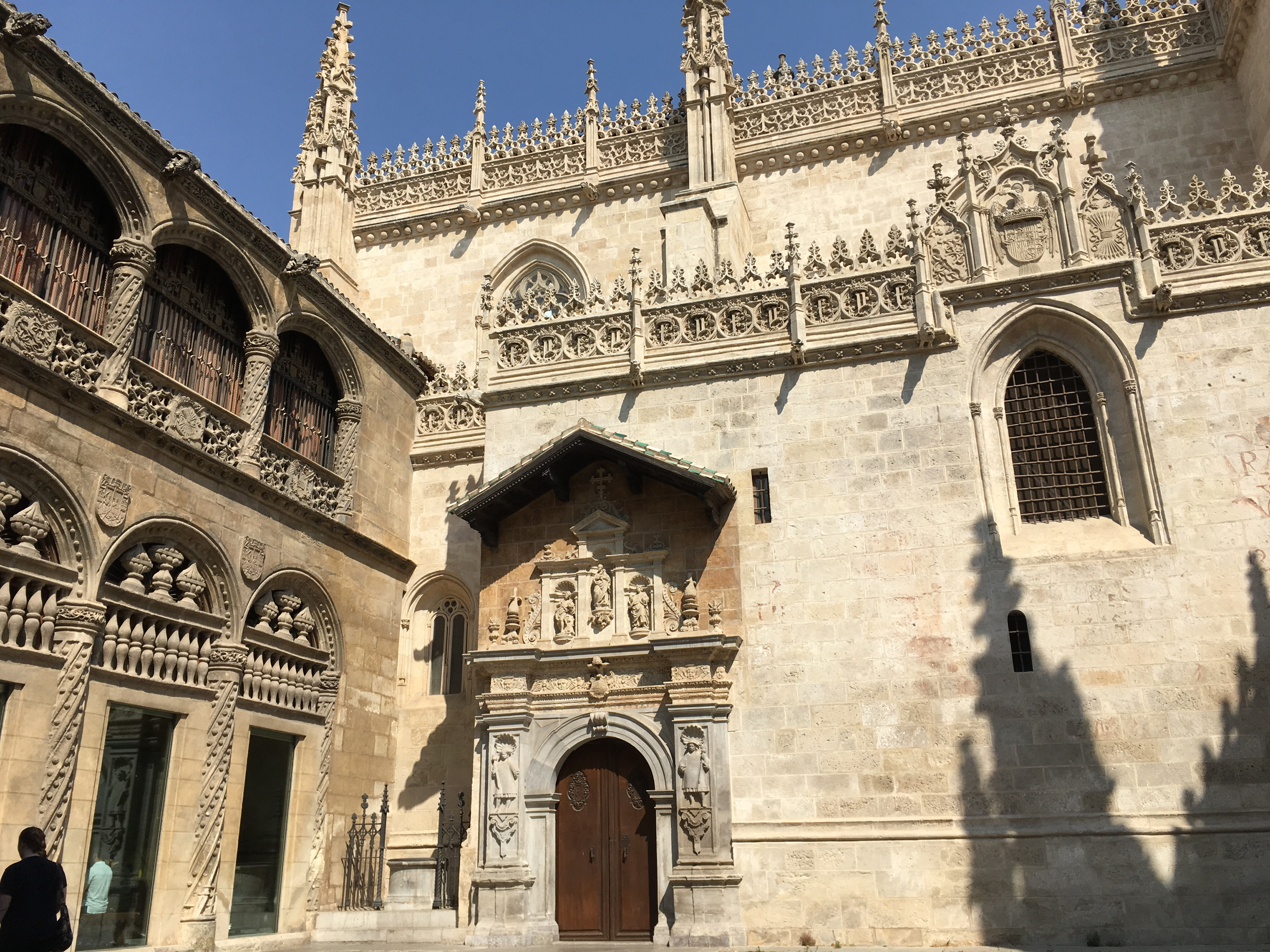
Royal Chapel of Granada

The Royal Chapel of Granada (Spanish: Capilla Real de Granada) is an Isabelline style building in Granada, Spain. Constructed between 1505 and 1517, it was originally integrated in the complex of the neighbouring Granada Cathedral. It is the burial place of the Spanish monarchs, Queen Isabella I and King Ferdinand, the Catholic Monarchs. Apart from these historical links, this building also contains a gallery of artworks and other items associated with Queen Isabella.

== History ==
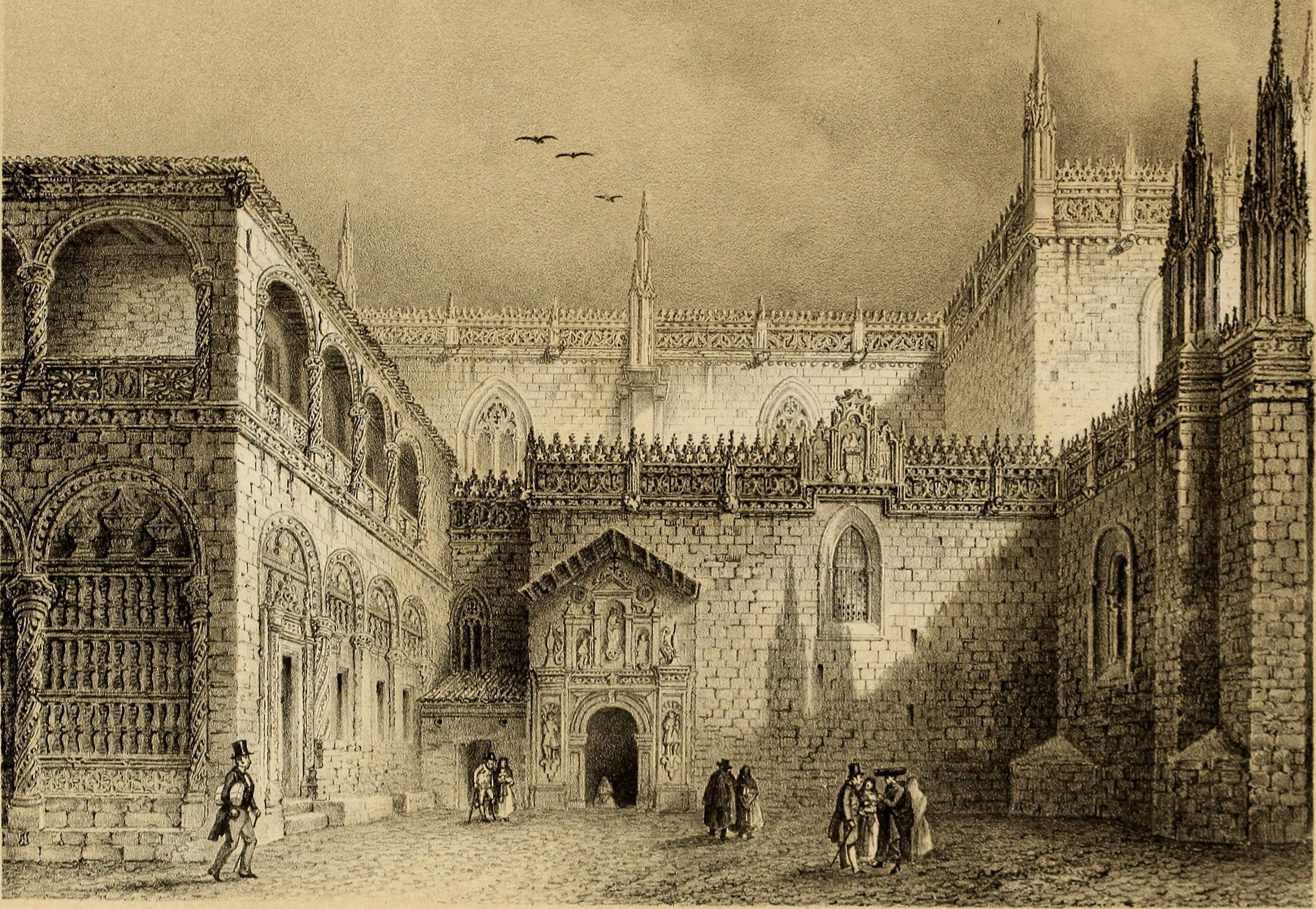
Royal Chapel of Granada in 1850, drawing by Francesc Xavier Parcerisa and published in Recuerdos y bellezas de España.

The Nasrid dynasty of Granada was the last Moorish dominion of Al-Andalus to fall in the Reconquista (Reconquest). This occurred in 1492 during the reign of the Catholic Monarchs, with the conquest of the city being an important stage of their combined reign. On September 13, 1504, they declared that they wanted their remains to be taken to Granada, and to this effect a royal charter was issued at Medina del Campo, Castile-León, for the Royal Chapel to be built. The charter states:

First we ordain that in the Cathedral of the city of Granada it made an honest chapel in which are, when the will of Our Lord be, our bodies buried. This chapel will be called Of the Kings under the invocation of Saint John the Baptist and Saint John the Evangelist.

The Royal Chapel was built between 1505 and 1517 in Isabelline Gothic style and dedicated to St. John the Baptist and St. John the Evangelist, with the construction under the direction of Enrique Egas in Gothic style. Juan Gil de Hontañón, Juan de Badajoz the Elder and Lorenzo Vázquez de Segovia were also involved in the construction project.

Construction occurred during the lifetime of King Ferdinand, and the Chapel flourished under his successor Emperor Charles V, with the church decorated, and the supporting institution being enhanced. The Capilla Real was the mausoleum of the Spanish royal family until the founding of El Escorial by Philip II.

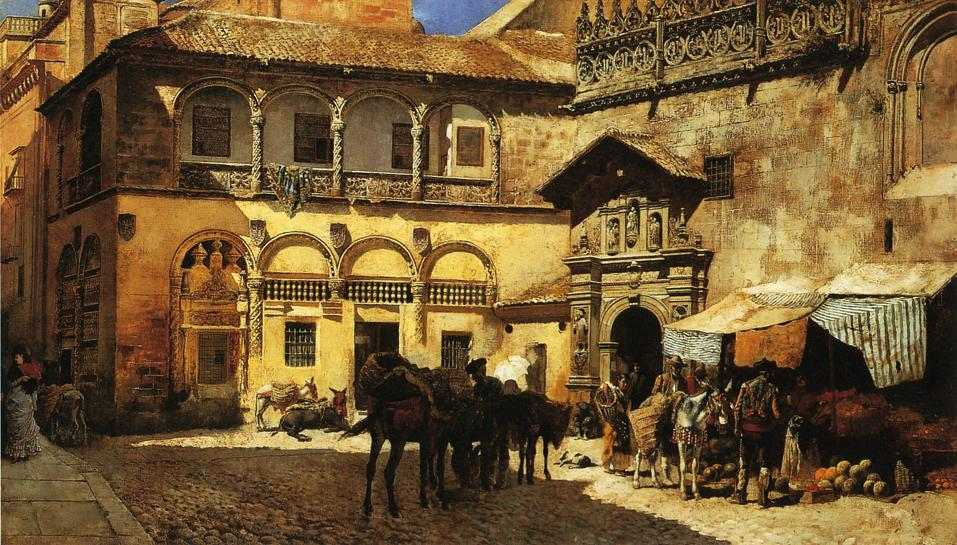
Market Square in Front of the Sacristy and Doorway of the Cathedral of Granada in the 19th century, drawing by American Edwin Lord Weeks.

The Royal Chapel became one of the top tourist attractions in Granada in the latter half of the twentieth century. Recently there has been a restoration with the collaboration of the Ministry of Culture of the Junta de Andalucía and the Foundation Caja Madrid, along with other public and private contributions.

== Architecture and sculpture ==
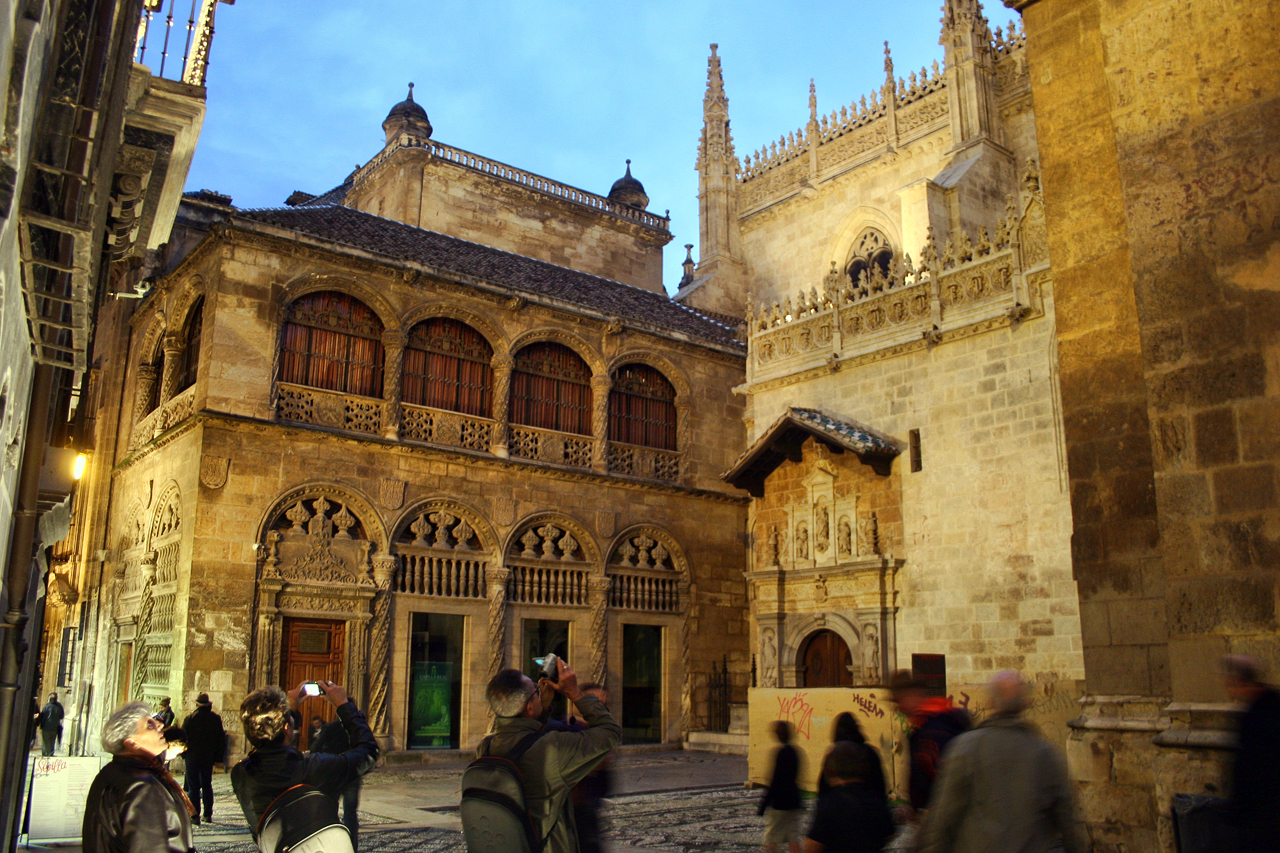
Royal Chapel of Granada, 2012

The interior of the chapel follows the same model as the Monastery of San Juan de los Reyes in Toledo. It has four side chapels, creating the form of a Latin cross and a nave with a Gothic ribbed vault. The choir has a centered arch down to its base, and a crypt.

The passage to the presbytery creates a luminous effect to symbolize the sun and the light of justice (in an Albertian, Neo-Platonic sense). There is a hierarchy of the transept dedicated to mausoleum, which is separated by a monumental decorated grille forged by Bartolomé Ordoñez.

In the center of the transept lie the tombs of Isabella and Ferdinand by Domenico Fancelli and Joanna and Philip (by Bartolomé Ordóñez). The tombs are set high and mark their priority and are almost at the height of the altar (symbolizes the closeness of the kings to God).

== Content ==
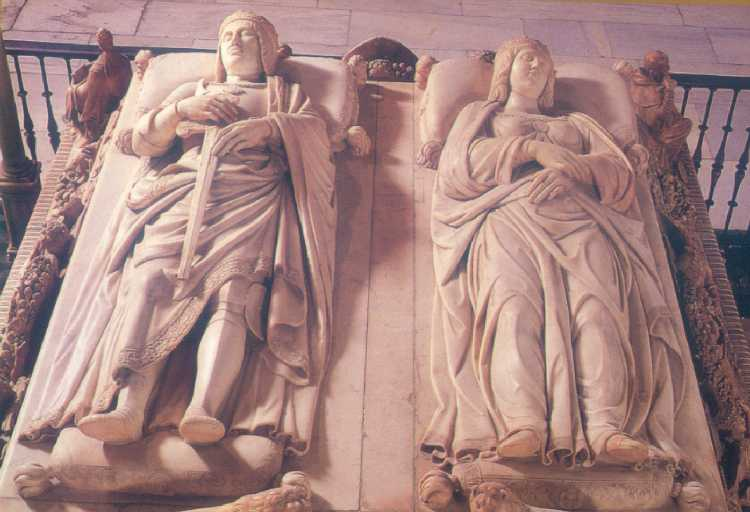
Tomb of the Catholic Monarchs, Royal Chapel of Granada, made in 1517 by Domenico Fancelli.

In the Royal Chapel can be seen the graves of:

- Isabella I of Castile, Queen of Castile, and of her husband
- Ferdinand II of Aragon, King of Aragon.

In another tomb, by Bartolomé Ordóñez, is represented:

- Joanna of Castile "the Mad", Queen of Castile and Aragon, and her husband:
- Philip I of Castile "the Handsome", King jure uxoris of Castile; his heart is buried in the Church of Our Lady in Bruges, Belgium.

In the crypt is also the sarcophagus of the infante Miguel da Paz, Prince of Portugal, grandson of the Catholic Monarchs, who died as a child.

The most important parts inside the temple are its main altar and reredos, the wrought-iron rood screen and the crypt with the five lead coffins containing the remains of kings and the little Infante, each recognizable by the initials of their names.

The chapel is still dedicated to Catholic worship, and at certain times it is closed to tourists.

One may also visit the Sacristy-Museum, with the legacy of the Catholic Monarchs. Highlights of its gallery of paintings are works of the Flemish, Italian and Spanish schools, with paintings by authors like Juan de Flandes and Hans Memling as well as a rare example by Sandro Botticelli (Agony in the Garden) and other 15th century painters like Rogier van der Weyden, Dirk Bouts, Perugino and Bartolomé Bermejo. Goldsmiths work on display includes the crown and the scepter of the Catholic Monarchs; tissues and books of the Queen.

In the angle between the Royal Chapel and the Sagrario is the Lonja, constructed in the year 1518 and dedicated to banking and commerce. It has recently been restored and can be visited, both for its architectural interest (the facade, the coffereds) and for the objects displayed inside (paintings, furniture).

== Maestros (music directors) ==
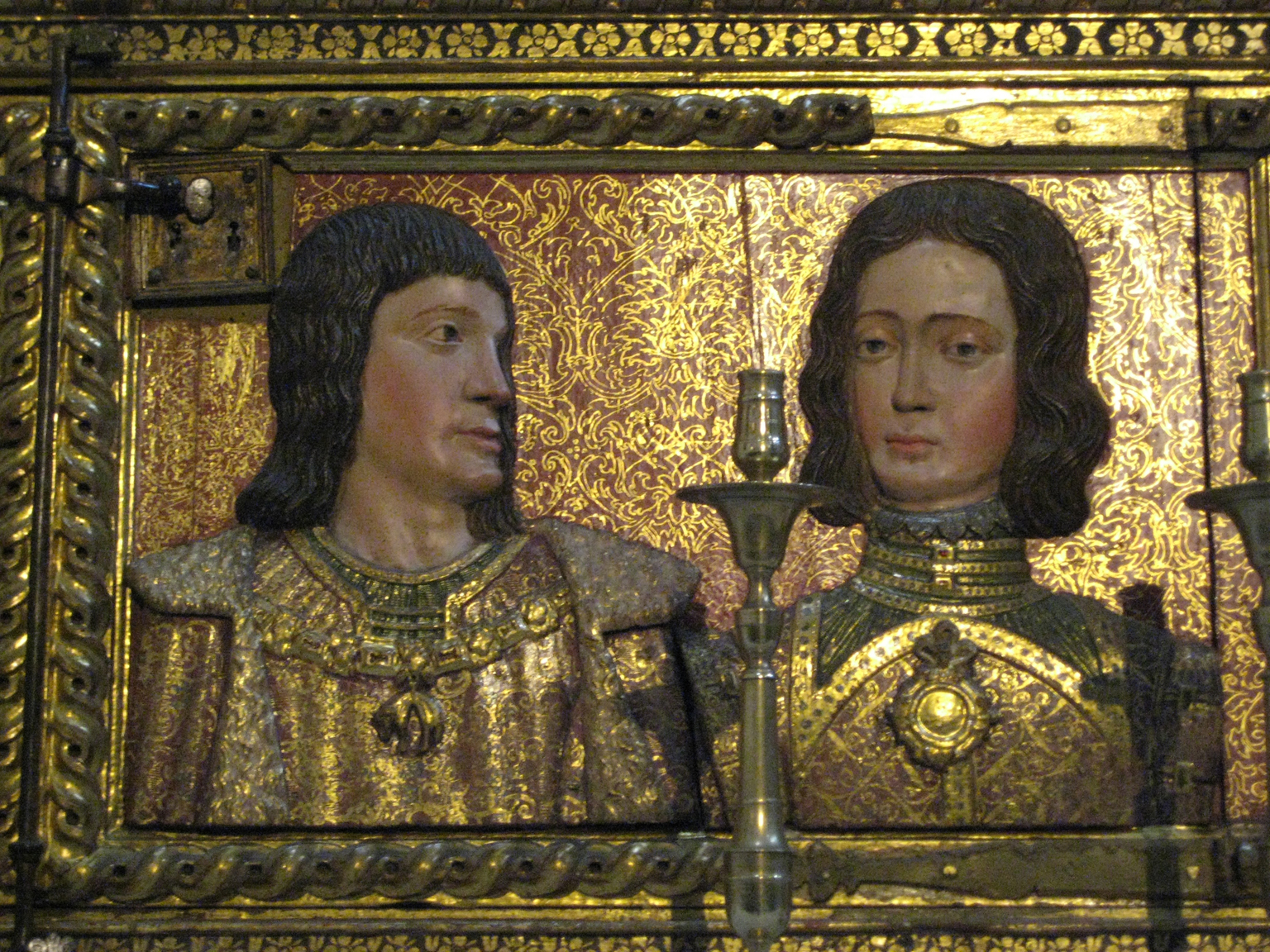
Philip I of Castile and Joanna of Castile by Alonso de Mena, c. 1632

From its foundation and for centuries, the Royal Chapel employed masters who were entrusted with composing music for liturgical functions, and direction of all matters relating to its interpretation. Between services these musicians had to attend to the education of the choirboys (known as infantillos or seises) and care of the archive.

Applicants for the post of maestro had to undergo competitive examinations testing their prowess at composition and musical knowledge. Success in the process could only be achieved by genuine artists. Among the files that make up the music catalog of this institution stand out for their number and their extraordinary chronological extension, those corresponding to the work of Antonio Cavallero, who was appointed to post in 1757, replacing Pedro Furió and officially it leaves to die around 1822, closing an interesting relationship of tenured masters. Other notable chapel masters of the Royal Chapel included:

- Bernardino de Figueroa – later bishop at Brindisi in Italy 1571–1591.
- Rodrigo de Ceballos (1561–1581)
- Ambrosio Cotes (1581–1596)
- Alonso de Mena (1587-1646) born in Granada.

== Notes ==
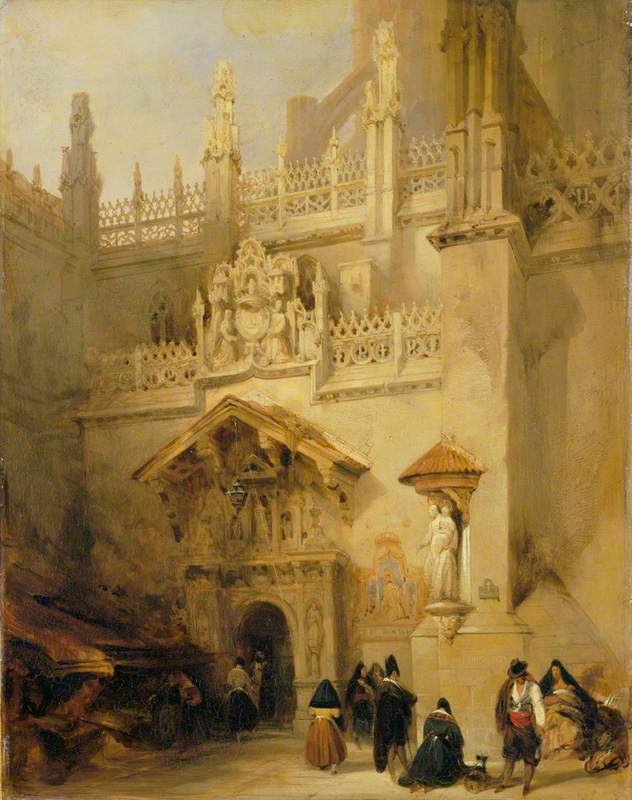
Chapel of Ferdinand and Isabella, Granada by David Roberts, 1838

- Spanish Monarchs since Charles V have been buried in the crypt at the Escorial in Castile.
- Prior to Isabella I, royal families were buried in cities across the Iberian Peninsula.
