= Domenico Fancelli =

Italian sculptor

Domenico Fancelli (1469–1519) was an Italian sculptor who worked primarily in Spain, where he was one of those who introduced Renaissance art. His most notable works are the tomb of Cardinal Diego Hurtado de Mendoza, in the Cathedral of Seville, and the tombs of the Catholic Monarchs (Queen Isabella I of Castile and King Ferdinand II of Aragon) in the Royal Chapel of Granada.

He was born in Settignano, near Florence. We know little about his education as a sculptor, but he appears to have studied in Florence and Rome. Íñigo López de Mendoza y Quiñones, Count of Tendilla, commissioned him in Genoa to sculpt a tomb for Mendoza's brother, Cardinal Diego Hurtado de Mendoza, who had died in 1502. The tomb was transported to Seville, where Fancelli helped to place it in the Cathedral.

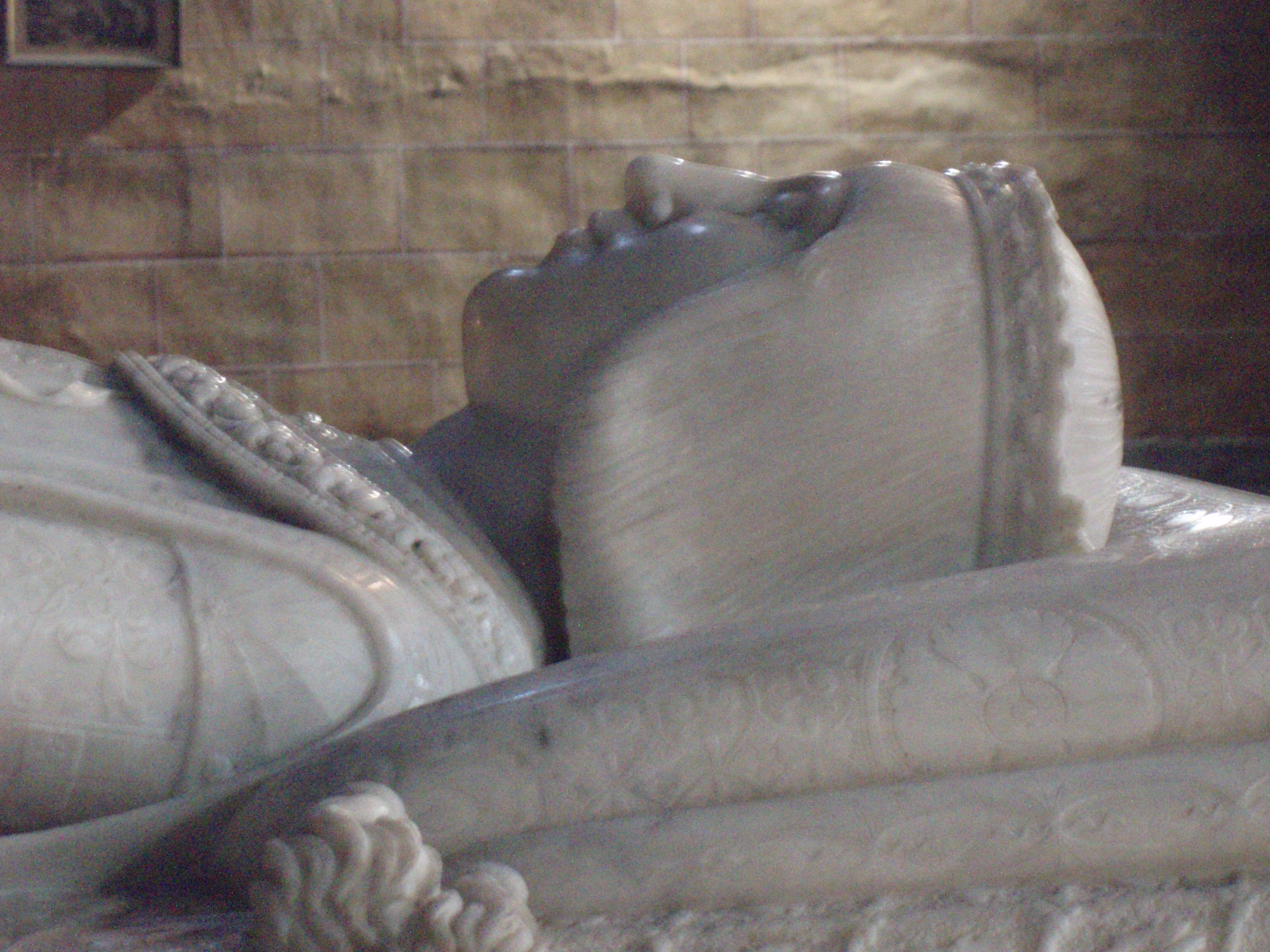
Detail of the tomb of John, Prince of Asturias.

Around 1510 he was commissioned to design and sculpt the tomb of John, Prince of Asturias, son of the Catholic Monarchs, who had died in 1497 at the age of 19. The tomb was to be located in Ávila at the Royal Monastery of Saint Thomas. The success of this project led to what might be his best known work, the tomb of the Catholic Monarchs in the Royal Chapel of the Cathedral of Granada, which he completed in 1517. Commissioned also to create tombs for Joanna and Philip I of Castile, he died before the project could be executed, and Bartolomé Ordóñez took his place.

His great influence on Spanish sculpture can be seen in the work of such artists as Vasco de la Zarza.
