= Bartolomé Ordóñez =

Bartolomé Ordóñez (Burgos, c. 1480 – Carrara, 6 December 1520) was a Spanish Renaissance sculptor.

== Life and work ==
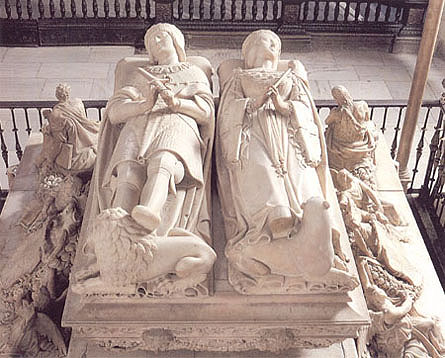
Granada. Royal Chapel. Tomb of Felipe I and Juana la Loca

Little is known about Ordóñez before the last five years of his life. His will indicates that he was an hidalgo born in Burgos, and that he had a sister named Marina in that city. Assuming this is correct, he would have grown up amidst the first flowering of the Spanish Renaissance, where such pioneers as Andrés de Nájera were working, under the influence of Gil de Siloé, who had studied in Italy, and Domenico Fancelli, who was from Italy.

In 1515 he established a studio in Barcelona, accompanied by three Italian marble sculptors, who came with him: Simón de Bellalana, Victorio Cogono and Juan Florentino. Even then, we know nothing of his actual work for the next two years. The cathedral chapter commissioned him 7 May 1517 to construct the choir stalls and the marble retrochoir of the Cathedral of Barcelona. A few months later, he and Juan Petit Monet were commissioned to create a group of sculptures representing the Entombment of Jesus for the Hospital de la Santa Creu; that piece does not survive. The embellishment of the choir was in preparation for a session of the Order of the Golden Fleece over which Charles I of Spain (Charles V, Holy Roman Emperor) was to preside in the cathedral in March 1519. This first documented work by Ordóñez involved collaboration by the Italian assistants in his studio, Monet, and, because of the magnitude and urgency of the work, expert woodcarvers, probably Siloé among them, but the unity of style and the uniform excellence shows that Ordóñez was a strong leader. The upper portion of the choir portrays scenes from the Old Testament—the Embarcation of Noah and the Sacrifice of Isaac—and the New Testament—Christ on the Road to Calvary, the Deposition of Christ, (Note: That is, the placement of the body of Jesus either on a slab (as in this portrayal) or into the arms of his mother immediately after the Descent from the Cross.) and the Resurrection—as well as the Four Evangelists and the Seven Virtues. All are notable for their quality, and also for the iconographic originality in the presentation to the Virgin Mary of the prophets redeemed from Hell by the risen Christ.

This work on the Cathedral of Barcelona was executed in two stages. After the stage just described, Ordóñez made a documented visit to Naples beginning 11 December 1517, during which, together with Diego Siloé, he worked in the Caracciolo di Vico chapel of the church of San Giovanni a Carbonara. Despite some conflicting traditional attributions of this work, a 1524 letter written by Pietro Summonte certifies beyond possible error that both Spaniards worked on the chapel, and although the letter refers only to the altarpiece, in view of similarities to the architectural organization of the retrochoir of the Cathedral of Barcelona the marble sheathing and architecture of the circular chapel (later echoed by the Guadix Cathedral) can probably also be attributed to Ordoñez. The altarpiece includes an excellent relief representing the Adoration of the Magi, with a delicate pyramidal composition reminiscent of Leonardo da Vinci, very balanced, and a perfect, nearly painterly, technique. This may not be Ordóñez's only work in Naples: he is believed to have designed and executed funerary monuments of Galeazzo Pandone in the Church of San Domenico Maggiore and of Andrea Bonifacio Cicaro in the Church of Saints Severinus and Sosius.

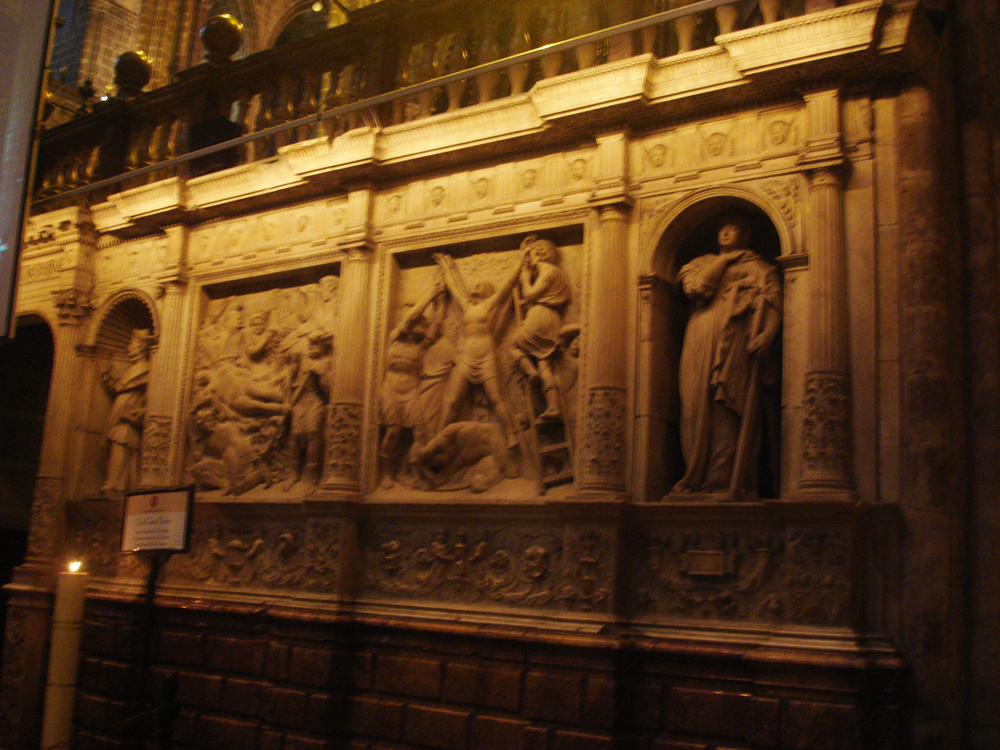
Right side of the retrochoir of the Cathedral of Barcelona.

Upon returning to Barcelona at the beginning of 1519 he married Catalina Calaf. His stay in Barcelona was not prolonged: in autumn of the same year, he left for Carrara. However, during this time he worked on the marble sculpture of the retrochoir of the Barcelona Cathedral; he did not complete this work, which was eventually finished in 1562 by Pedro Villar. This was organized as a Doric colonnade crowned by a balustrade, raised over an unadorned base; the sculptures were located in the spaces between the columns. Richly adorned, this work shows aspects coinciding with the Caracciolo chapel. Ordoñez composed reliefs representing the profession of faith by Saint Eulalia before the judges (showing a strong influence from Michelangelo) and the moment of her martyrdom, in which the flames, far from consuming her chaste, naked body, turn against the executioners. The representation related to Saint Severus is also his, but the images of Saint Olegarius and Saint Raymond of Peñafort date from the 17th century.

Other possible works of his in Spain are the alabaster relief Holy Conversation in the Diocesan Museum of Barcelona, poorly finished, and the Resurrection in the retrochoir chapel of the Cathedral of Valencia. On 1 May 1519, he undertook a contract for work previously contracted to Domenico Fancelli: the tombs of Philip I and Joanna of Castile in Granada and of Cardinal Cisneros in Alcalá de Henares, and according to his last will, those of some of the Fonseca family. He traveled to Carrara, with the intent of returning to Barcelona, but upon the death of his wife he started a new studio in Carrara; he worked feverishly there, but he himself died the following year.

He left the tomb of Joanna and Felipe for the Royal Chapel of Granada nearly complete. His work was much superior to that of Fancelli, whom he no doubt inspired into changing his style when he returned to the side walls of the tomb over which, in a platter, with Saint John the Apostle, Saint John the Evangelist, the Archangel Michael, and the Saint Andrew at the corners, are the recumbent forms of the monarchs depicted with idealized faces. Each section of the main body of the tomb is decorated with reliefs; the most notable by Ordóñez are the Nativity, the Adoration of the Kings, the Agony in the Garden and the Descent from the Cross, but there are a plenitude of other figures and ornamental elements.

The tomb of Cardinal Cisneros, which was left incomplete, is of inferior quality; the recumbent figure of the Cardinal was completed, austere and realistic with the air of a portrait. This tomb, made for the Chapel of the Complutense University of Madrid, is similar to—but smaller than—the royal tomb; the roundels are filled by the doctors of the Spanish Church and the patron saints of the monarchs are replaced by the Latin Fathers of with emblems of the liberal arts situated in the niches.

The tombs of the Fonsecas in Coca, province of Segovia, are of less artistic interest, an exchange of pieces between the two principal tombs made it difficult to distinguish the work of Fancelli from that of Ordóñez until the definitive clarification of attributions by Manuel Gómez Moreno, attributing to Ordóñez the tombs of Alonso de Fonseca and his mother, as well as those of Archbishop of Seville Alonso de Fonseca and Bishop of Burgos Juan Rodríguez de Fonseca; the latter being perfectly documented as the work of Ordóñez or his studio. The Virgin and Child and Saint John (originally in the Monastery of Saint Jerome in Zamora, now in the Cathedral of Zamora) are according to Gómez Moreno, mentioned in the inventory of his studio by the Fonsecas.
