= Diego de Pesquera =

Spanish sculptor

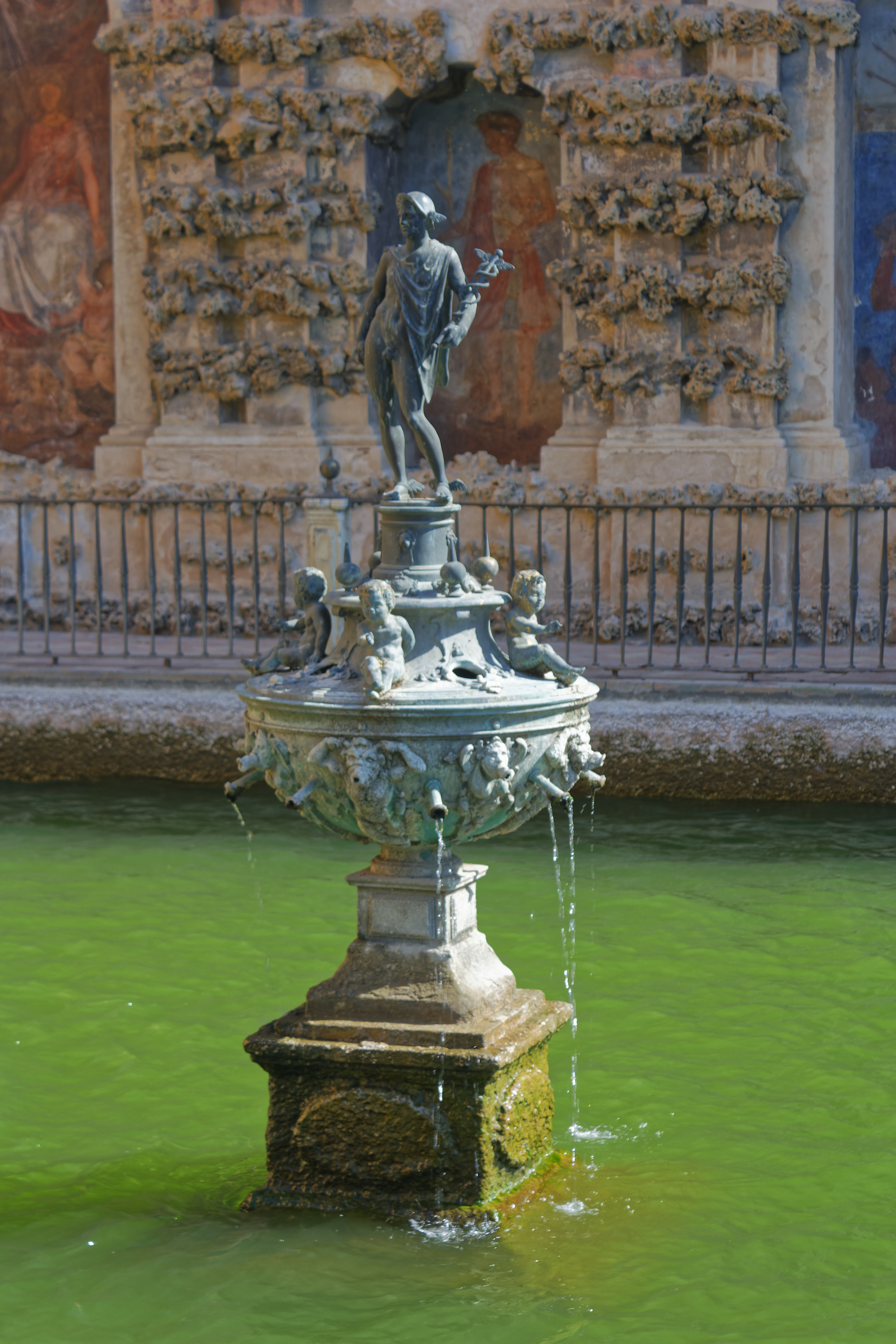
The statue of Mercury by Diego de Pesquera, cast by Bartolome Morel, Jardines de Mercurio, Alcázar of Seville, 1576

Diego de Pesquera was a 16th-century Spanish sculptor of the Sevillian and Granadan schools. Records show he was active in the city of Granada in 1563, and in Seville from 1571 to 1580. With a style influenced by the Italian Renaissance and that of Michelangelo, he may have trained in Italy.

For Granada, he worked on the gate of the Sala Capitular at the cathedral and in 1567 at the church of San Pedro - he also produced the altarpieces at Colomera and Ogíjares. One of his most important works from that period was the group of Saint Anne, the Virgin Mary and the Christ Child in Granada Cathedral.

For the Capilla Real (royal chapel) of Seville Cathedral, he produced sculptures of Saint Justa and Saint Rufina. His reliefs for the chapter-house anteroom at Seville Cathedral also survive from this, his final period.

He also worked on non-sacred themes, in 1574 producing sculptures of Julius Caesar and Hercules for La Alameda. Another work on this theme was his Flight of Mercury on the Plaza de San Francisco in Seville.
