= Teresa Sampsonia =

Iranian Noblewoman of the Safavid Empire

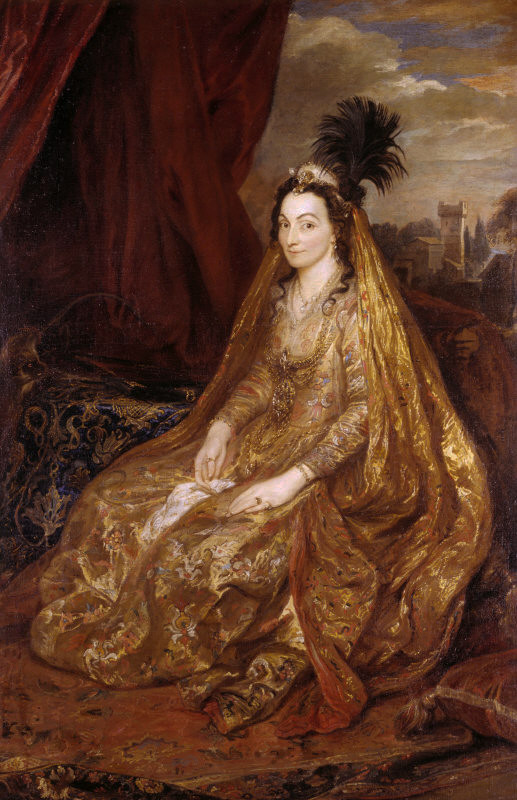
- Lady Shirley, 1622
- Born: 1589; Safavid Iran
- Died: 1668 (aged 79); Rome, Papal States
- Resting place: Santa Maria della Scala; 41°53′28″N 12°28′04″E
- Spouse: Robert Shirley
- Children: Henry Shirley

Teresa Sampsonia (Note: Her baptismal first name is also written "Teresia", "Theresia", or "Theresa".) (born Sampsonia; after marriage Lady Shirley, 1589–1668) was a Circassian-English noblewoman of Safavid Iran. She was the wife of the Elizabethan English adventurer Robert Shirley, whom she accompanied on his travels and embassies across Europe in the name of the Safavid emperor Abbas the Great (r. 1588–1629).

Teresa was received by many of the royal houses of Europe, such as English prince Henry Frederick and Queen Anne (her child's godparents) and contemporary writers and artists such as Thomas Herbert and Anthony van Dyck. Herbert considered Robert Shirley "the greatest Traveller of his time", but admired the "undaunted Lady Teresa" even more. Following the death of her husband from dysentery in 1628, and due to impediments from grandees at the court, and the authorities, during the reign of Abbas's successor and grandson Safi (r. 1629–1642), Teresa decided to leave Iran. She lived in a convent in Rome for the rest of her life, devoting her time to charity and religion. As a pious Christian, and because of her love for her husband, Teresa had Shirley's remains transported to Rome from Isfahan and reburied; on the headstone of their mutual grave she mentions their travels and refers to her noble Circassian origins.

Thanks to her exploits, Teresa has been described as someone who subverted patriarchal gender roles common to the Muslim and Christian cultures of her time. Due to their hybrid identities and adventures, Teresa and her husband became the subject of several contemporary literary and visual works. Nevertheless, the story of Teresa as an important woman of the 17th century has been largely overshadowed and obscured by the tale of her husband Robert and his brothers.

== Sources ==
The travels of Teresa and Robert Shirley were recorded in many contemporaneous English, Italian, Latin and Spanish sources, including eyewitness accounts. According to Penelope Tuson, the main sources that deal with Teresa's life are the "predictably semi-hagiographic" accounts stored in the archives of the Vatican and the Carmelite order. These Vatican and Carmelite sources were compiled, edited and published by Herbert Chick in 1939 in his Chronicle of the Carmelites in Persia. (Note: The two-volume set was re-edited and republished in 2012 by I.B.Tauris.) Though the Chronicle of the Carmelites in Persia evidently portrays a positive image of Teresa, Tuson notes that the accounts are "patchy" and "contradictory" on some occasions. Furthermore, the narrative is considered to be from the viewpoint of European Catholicism. Other sources that help create a modern scholarly account of Teresa include the only document she is known to have written in English (a petition to King James I of England r. 1603–1625), paintings, and to a lesser extent, official letters signed by Abbas the Great (r. 1588–1629).

== Early life and marriage ==
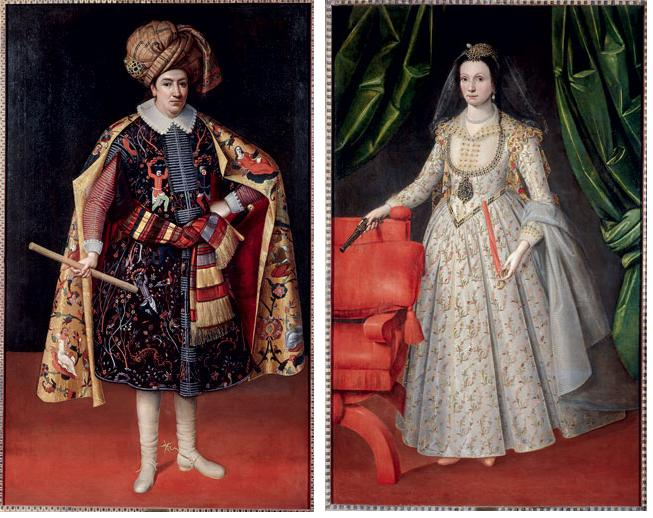
Portraits of Robert Shirley and Teresa Sampsonia, c. 1624–1627. Shirley is wearing Persian clothing; Teresa, in the European (English) fashion of the day, holds a jewelled flintlock pistol in her right hand and a watch in her left. (Note: According to Canby (2009), the pistol and watch "may be allusions to Robert's role in advancing the import of European technology to Iran". Canby adds that the pistol may also be an allusion to Teresa's courage (referring to the two events in which she saved Robert's life; after departing on their first mission, and later when hostile Portuguese attacked them on their way to Goa).) Teresa's veil and jewelled crown are a variation on the headdresses worn by Iranian women from Isfahan in the first quarter of the seventeenth century.

Teresa was born in 1589 into a noble Orthodox Christian (Note: Greek or Georgian Orthodoxy.) Circassian family in the Safavid Empire, ruled at the time by Shah Abbas the Great. She was named Sampsonia at birth. The daughter of Ismail Khan, a brother-in-law of the emperor, she grew up in Isfahan in the Iranian royal court as a reportedly beautiful, accomplished horsewoman who enjoyed embroidery and painting. (Note: The birth name of her father Ismail Khan is uncertain. On her grave, he is referred to as "Samphuffus", while according to Chick & Matthee (2012) and Andrea (2017), he was also known by the name of "Sampsuff Iscaon".)

Robert Shirley was an English adventurer who was sent to the Safavids, after a Persian embassy was sent to Europe, to forge an alliance against the neighbouring Ottoman Empire, rivals of the Safavids. During his attendance at court, Teresa met him and fell in love. On 2 February 1608, with the approval of her aunt and Abbas, (Note: Teresa's aunt was one of the favourite wives of King Abbas I.) Teresa married Robert Shirley in Iran. At about the time of their wedding, she was baptised as a Roman Catholic by the Carmelites in Isfahan with the name Teresa. (Note: Andrea (2017) considers it likely that the Safavid emperor had arranged Teresa's marriage with Shirley in reward for his deeds.) Her baptismal name derives from the founder of the Discalced Carmelites, Teresa of Ávila.

Her origin and early life have been the subject of uncertainty. The culture and structure of the Persian royal court and an equivalent European royal court did not function in the same way, which caused misunderstandings in interpretation of information. An English source from 1677 related that "[s]he was of Christian parentage, and honorable descent" and the niece of a Circassian wife of the Shah. A Western interpretation of this was that she was a noblewoman and attended the "Iranian Royal court" in the same fashion as was common in Europe, where the daughters of nobility attended the royal court to serve as ladies-in-waiting, and met Robert Shirley in this way.

However, in a Muslim court, women lived in gender segregation. There was no such thing as ladies-in-waiting in the Western sense of the word, and there was no possibility for her to have met Robert Shirley and fallen in love with him prior to marriage. The women of the Persian court of the Safavid dynasty lived in seclusion from men confined to the Safavid imperial harem, which were staffed with enslaved women raised and tutored to serve either as harem servants or as consorts of the Shah, many of whom were Christian Circassians, bought in the slave market or given as gifts. Teresa Sampsonia were likely related to one of these enslaved Circassian harem women, either a "favorite wife", slave concubine, or a servant. As a slave, she would not have been Muslim, since Islamic law banned the enslavement of other Muslims, and the enslaved women of the harem were normally non-Muslim.

The Carmelite records describe how Robert Shirley: "purchased a slave [i.e., Terese Sampsonia] from Circassia, a province situated between Muscovy and Persia, who belonged to the Muhammadan faith, kept her as his wife [sua donna] and, because it was made a point of religious scruple and duty, he had her baptized by Fr [Friar] Paul Simon, the Discalced Carmelite, and married her...". It was a common custom for a ruler in the Islamic world to give a woman raised in his harem in marriage to a man he wished to favor, and the Shah likely arranged for Robert Shirley to marry Teresa Sampsonia as a reward in this manner.

== Travels ==
=== First mission ===
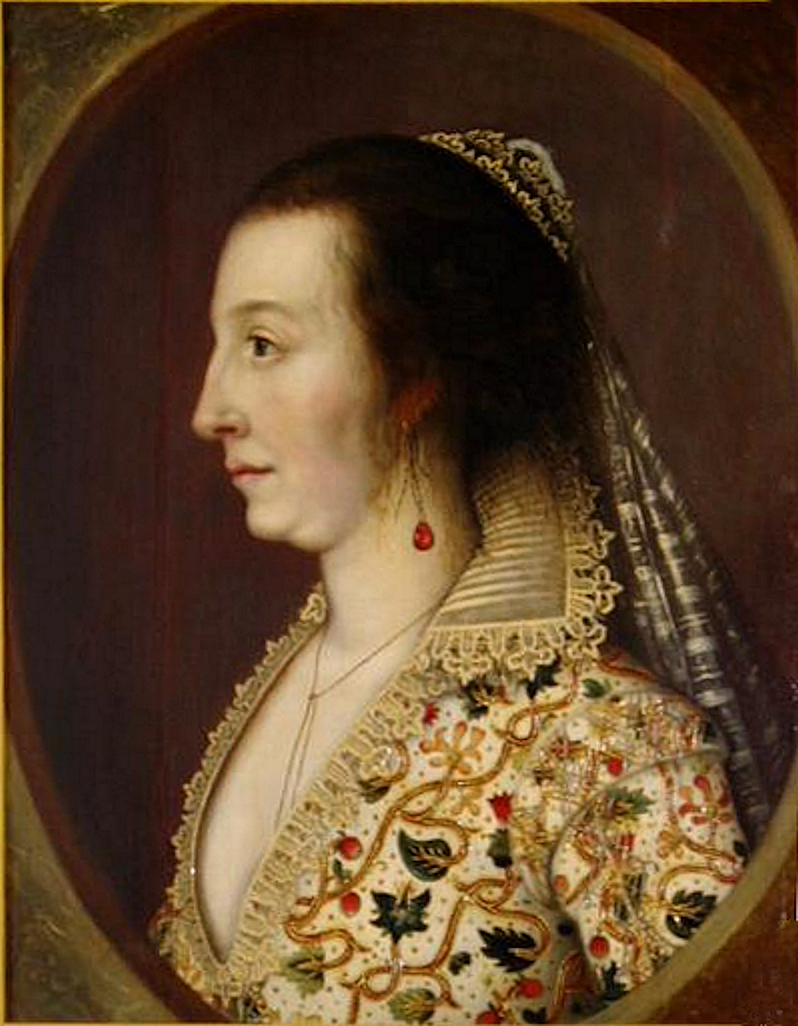
Lady Shirley, painted c. 1611–1613 by William Larkin in England, and dressed in then contemporary attire. According to art historian Patricia Smyth, "the embroidery on Teresa's dress includes honeysuckles, which are to signify love, as well as strawberries, as a symbol for fruitfulness". Smyth notes that these emblems may have an additional meaning "as the Shirley's child, Henry, was born during this short stay in England".

Teresa accompanied Robert on his diplomatic missions for Shah Abbas to the Kingdom of England and other royal houses in Europe. When they set off on their first embassy trip, Robert was captured by his enemies. Teresa reportedly managed to save him and put to flight the attackers; for this, the Carmelite records praised her as "a true Amazon". (Note: The Amazons are traditionally linked with the Black Sea region, the same area associated with a major part of the ancestral homeland of the Circassians (Circassia).) In Poland, Teresa lived in a convent in Kraków for some time while her husband visited Prague, where Emperor Rudolph II (r. 1576–1612) bestowed on him the title of Count Palatine. He arrived in Rome on 27 September 1609 and met Ali Qoli Beg, Abbas I's ambassador, with whom he had an audience with the Pope. Shirley then left for the Duchy of Savoy, Florence, Milan, Genoa, the Kingdom of France, Flanders, and Habsburg Spain (Barcelona and Madrid). Teresa rejoined him in Lisbon via Hamburg. They then went to Valladolid and Madrid where Teresa came to know the Carmelite nuns, particularly Mother Beatrix de Jesus (the niece of Saint Teresa) from whom she received a relic of Teresa.

Teresa and Shirley left for the Dutch Republic and subsequently sailed from Bayonne to England, where they arrived around the beginning of August 1611. Their only child, a son named Henry, in all likelihood the first English-born child of Iranian descent according to Sheila R. Canby, was born in November 1611 at the Shirley home in Sussex. (Note: Andrea (2017) agrees with Canby (2009), referring to Henry as "possibly the first Anglo-Persian born in England".) His godparents were Henry Frederick, Prince of Wales, for whom he was named, and Queen Anne. Teresa and Robert remained in England a little over a year. Before departing from Gravesend to Safavid Iran in 1612–1613, they decided to turn young Henry over to Robert's family in Sussex. He is believed to have survived until at least 1622, but to have died at a young age. Teresa and Shirley's two-and-a-half-year return voyage to Iran proved to be extremely difficult. On one occasion, they were almost killed at sea. On another, during their short stop in Mughal India to meet Emperor Jahangir (r. 1605–1627), hostile Portuguese tried to assassinate the couple. (Note: Around that time, the English had become a major threat to the Portuguese colonial establishment in the Indian Ocean and the Persian Gulf.) The couple remained in Iran for a few months, before embarking on their second embassy.

=== Second mission ===
On their last mission, Teresa and Robert arrived in Lisbon through Goa on 27 September 1617. They headed towards Madrid, where they stayed until March 1622, then went to Florence and Rome. During this last brief visit to Rome between 22 July and 29 August 1622, Anthony van Dyck (then 23 years old) painted their portraits. The couple then went to Warsaw in Poland, and perhaps Moscow afterwards, before visiting England in 1623 for the last time. They sailed for the Safavid Empire in 1627 on an East India Company ship with Dodmore Cotton, an envoy from the King of England to Persia and other courts. Teresa and Robert returned to Isfahan through Surat and Bandar Abbas. The couple then moved to Qazvin (the former capital of Safavid Iran) where the emperor rewarded them with valuable gifts. Shirley and Cotton became seriously ill with fever (probably dysentery), shortly after their arrival.

== Departure from Safavid Iran ==
Shirley and Teresa were troubled by the jealousy of several nobles and grandees at court, who spread a rumour that Teresa was a Muslim before she became a Christian. They disgraced her to the Shah, and it was reportedly published in the court that he intended to execute her by burning. (Note: Apostasy in Islam was (and is) considered a crime punishable by the death penalty. See also; Apostasy in Islam.) Fifteen days after hearing the report, Robert died of fever on 13 July 1628 in Qazvin. According to his wishes, he was buried in the Discalced Carmelite church in Isfahan. The Shah summoned Teresa, asking her why the grandees were so opposed to her. She remained silent to protect them; according to contemporaneous accounts, the Shah advised her not to be afraid, "because it would be harder for him to put one woman to death than a hundred men". Some of his corrupt officials plundered her wealth. Teresa reportedly became seriously ill, and was moved to Isfahan to receive the sacraments from the priests; she recovered and decided to move to a Christian land.

In the Safavid Empire, women were prohibited from travelling abroad without permission. So the Carmelites in Isfahan asked the governor of Shiraz, Imam Quli Khan, son of the celebrated Allahverdi Khan (one of Abbas's closest associates), for consent on Teresa's behalf. A favourite of Imam Quli Khan wanted to marry Teresa, and reminded the governor of the report that she had been a Muslim before she was a Christian. She was ordered to appear before a mullah (a religious judge) in a mosque, who would question her about her past and her religion. This was unacceptable to the Carmelites, who asked the governor to have Teresa questioned in the church of the Carmelite fathers. The mullah rejected this, but an agreement was reached that they would meet in the home of a steward of the governor of Shiraz, who was a friend of the Carmelite Fathers. She was questioned for an hour before she was allowed to return home.

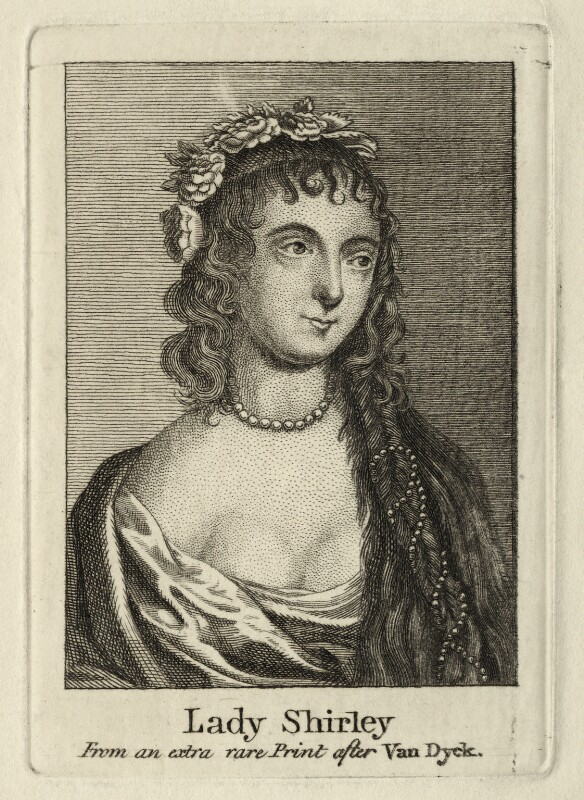
Etching of Teresa, Lady Shirley, possibly late 18th century. Made after an illustration by van Dyck.

Safavid Iran was disturbed by the death of Shah Abbas a few months after Shirley's death. Abbas's grandson, Safi (r. 1629–1642), succeeded him; he was less consistent than his grandfather in his religious tolerance. The favourite of Imam Quli Khan, who still wanted to marry Teresa, sent his servants to the Carmelites in Isfahan to capture her. The priests denied knowing her whereabouts, and advised her to take refuge in the Church of Saint Augustine in New Julfa (the Armenian quarter in Isfahan). The priests were brought to the favourite's house and reportedly threatened with torture before they were released.

The mullah asked Imam Quli Khan for permission to question Teresa again. Since he favoured the Carmelite Fathers, and did not want to insult the mullah, he said that the matter concerned Isfahan prefect (darugha) Khosrow Mirza. The prefect, like the governor of Shiraz, was also a Georgian. He had Teresa arrested and brought before him; a judge questioned her about her religion. She professed her Christianity, reportedly saying that she would die "a thousand times" for it. The judge accused her of lying and threatened to burn her alive if she did not convert to Islam. When Teresa refused, the judge threatened to have her thrown from a tower; she reportedly said that would suit her better, because she would die (and go to heaven) more quickly. According to the Carmelites, the judge was shamed by her reminder of Shirley's service. He ended the questioning and reported to the prefect of Isfahan who allowed Teresa to return to her house and had the mullah dismissed. The Carmelite Fathers received the necessary permission from the governor of Shiraz in September 1629. Teresa's departure was documented in a letter from Father Dimas in the Carmelite archives in Rome:

18.9.1629 ... The lady Countess Donna Teresa, who was the consort of the late Count Palatine Don Robert Sherley, leaves here for Rome; she is a lady of great spirit and valour ... In these parts, she has been an apostle and a martyr confessed and professed ...

— Father Dimas

Three years after returning from her last trip, Teresa left her country of birth forever. She lived in Constantinople for three years, receiving a certificate from the commissary general of the Dominicans in the East on 21 June 1634 reportedly attesting to her pious conduct. Around that time, she decided to retire to a convent in Rome, which was attached to the Carmelite Santa Maria della Scala church.

== Later life and death ==
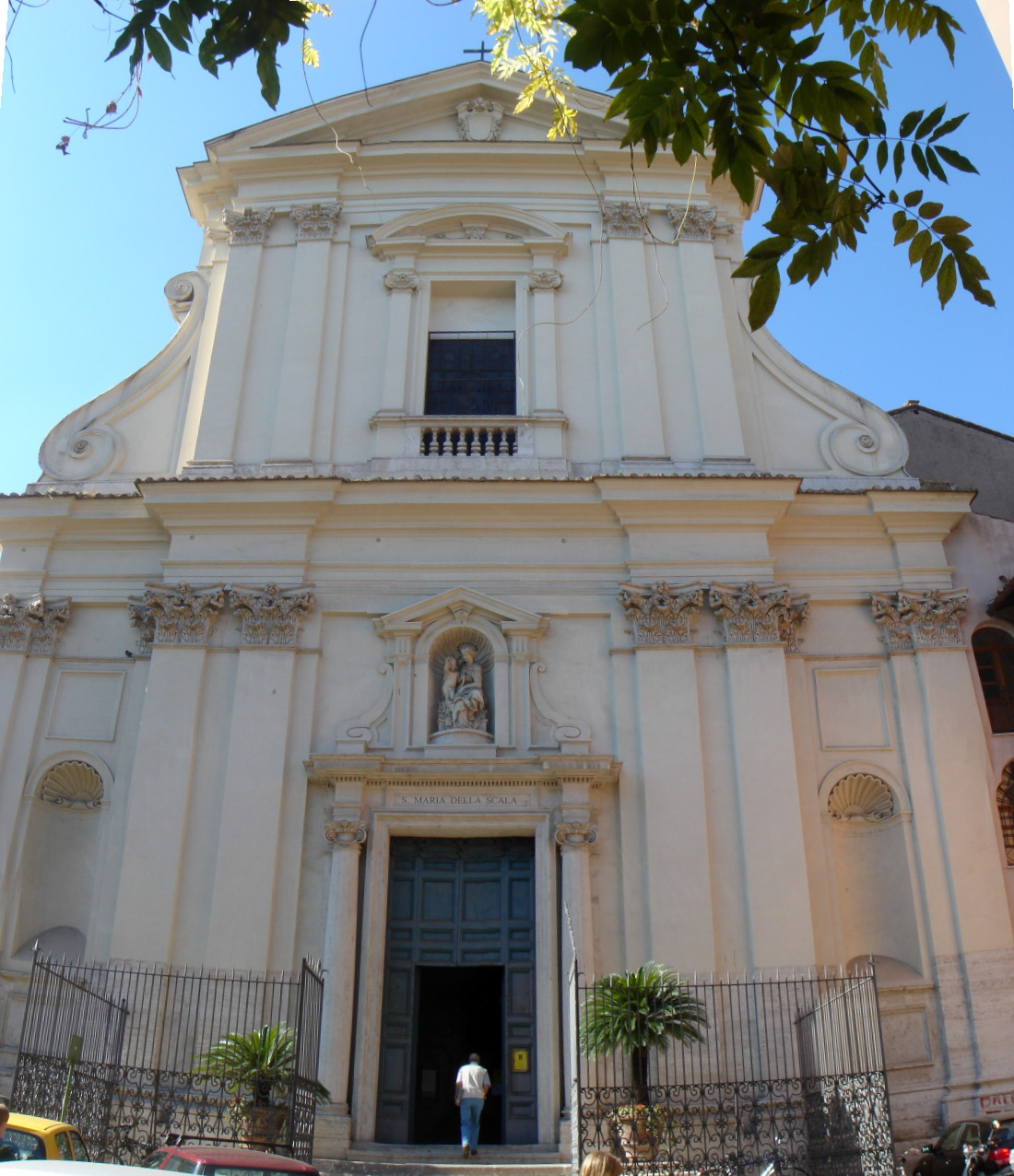
Santa Maria della Scala in the Trastevere rione of Rome, where Teresa remained for the rest of her life

On 27 December 1634 she arrived in Rome and was received kindly by Pope Urban VIII, who entrusted her to the Carmelites. Teresa bought a house next to the church. In 1658 she had Robert's remains transported from Isfahan to Rome, where he was reburied in the Santa Maria della Scala. In the Carmelite convent, she devoted herself to charity and religion until her death at age 79 in 1668. Teresa was buried in the church, where she had lived for forty years, in the same grave where she had buried her husband Robert ten years earlier.

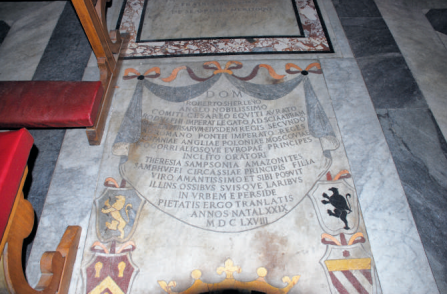
The headstone of Teresa and Robert Shirley in the Santa Maria della Scala

She had the headstone inscribed:

Deo Optimo Maximo Roberto Sherleyo Anglo Nobilissimo Comiti Cesareo Equiti Aurato Rodulfi II Imperatori Legato Ad Scia Abbam Regem Persarum et Eiusdeum Regis Secundo Ad Romanos Pontifices Imperatores Reges Hispaniae Angliae Poloniae Moscoviae Mogorri Aliosque Europae Principes Inclito Oratori. Theresia Sampsonia Amazonites Samphuffi Circassiae Principes Filia Viro Amatissimo et Sibi Posuit Illius Ossibus Suisque Laribus In Urbem E Perside Pietatis Ergo Translatis Annos Nata LXXIX MDCLXVIII
(To God, the Best and Greatest. For Robert Sherley, most noble Englishman, Count Palatine, Knight of the Golden Spur, Emperor Rudolph II's envoy to Shah Abbas, the King of Persia, (and) the representative of the same King to the Popes of Rome, to Emperors, to the Kings of Spain, England, Poland, Muscovy, and the Mogul Empire, distinguished ambassador to other European princes. Theresia Sampsonia, native of the land of the Amazons, daughter of Samphuffus, prince of Circassia, set up [this monument] for her most beloved husband and for herself, as a resting place for his bones—brought to Rome from Persia for dutiful devotion's sake—and for her own, aged seventy-nine. 1668.

(Note: "Land of the Amazons" (sometimes translated as "region of the Amazons") is another reference to her Circassian origins.)

According to Bernadette Andrea (2017), the text demonstrates that Teresa subverted the patriarchal gender roles common to the Muslim and Christian cultures of her time.

== In popular culture ==
The adventures of Teresa and her husband, and what Andrea calls their "hybrid identities", inspired a variety of literary and visual works. According to Manoutchehr Eskandari-Qajar, Shirley and his "exotic wife with an even more exotic life story" sparked a great deal of curiosity and interest among their contemporaries in the West. During her journeys between Persia and Europe, Teresa was remarked upon by contemporary writers, artists and European royal houses. Travel writer Thomas Herbert described Shirley as "the greatest Traveller of his time", but he admired the "undaunted Lady Teresa" even more, as one whose "faith was ever Christian".

Teresa and her husband were invariably noted for their exotic garb. In every high-level meeting, Shirley appeared in his high-status Persian attire of silk and velvet. He was Persianized to such a degree that contemporary playwright and pamphleteer Thomas Middleton referred to him as the "famous English Persian". Works inspired by the couple include two portraits by van Dyck, pamphlets in many languages, and Jacobean stage plays including The Travels of the Three English Brothers. Lady Mary Wroth's Urania was partly influenced by Teresia Sampsonia's travels to England with her husband. Tuson argues that Teresa's story has been overshadowed by "the partly self-created myth of the Shirley's", who became the main subject of many of the contemporary "biographies as well as subsequent historical studies". Carmen Nocentelli notes that the "figure of Teresa has been generally obscured by those of her male relatives". According to Nocentelli:

Whether she is identified as "Sir Robert Sherley...his Persian lady", "the Sophies Neece," or "the King of Persia his cousin Germaine", she is little more than a prop in the so-called Sherley myth, a tale of masculine globe-trotting featuring Robert and his two older brothers, Anthony and Thomas, as exemplars of English prowess and entrepreneurism.

Nocentelli does add that the belittling of Teresa as a historic figure of importance was limited to England. Outside England, "Teresa Sampsonia Sherley was a figure of note in and of her own right". Contemporaneous Italian traveller Pietro della Valle referred to Teresa as an "Ambassadress of the King of Persia", which Nocentelli interprets as putting Teresa on an "equal footing with her husband". In 2009, in London, there were two simultaneous exhibitions which featured Teresa and her husband: Shah 'Abbas: The Remaking of Iran (British Museum, February to June 2009) and Van Dyck and Britain (Tate Britain, February to May 2009).

== See also ==
- Circassians in Iran
- Portrait of Lady Theresa Shirley

== Bibliography ==
- Andrea, Bernadette (2015). "The "Presences of Women" from the Islamic World in Sixteenth- to Seventeenth-Century British Literature and Culture". In Wiesner-Hanks, Merry E. (ed.). Mapping Gendered Routes and Spaces in the Early Modern World. Routledge. pp. 291–306. ISBN 978-1472429605.
- Andrea, Bernadette (2017a). The Lives of Girls and Women from the Islamic World in Early Modern British Literature and Culture (1500–1630). University of Toronto Press. ISBN 978-1-4875-0125-9.
- Andrea, Bernadette (2017b). "Islamic Communities". In Hiscock, Andrew; Wilcox, Helen (eds.). The Oxford Handbook of Early Modern English Literature and Religion. Oxford University Press. pp. 511–525. ISBN 978-0191653421.
- Andrea, Bernadette (2019). "The Global Travels of Teresa Sampsonia Sherley's Carmelite Relic". In Akhimie, Patricia; Andrea, Bernadette (eds.). Travel and Travail: Early Modern Women, English Drama, and the Wider World. University of Nebraska Press. ISBN 978-1496202260.
- Blow, David (2009). Shah Abbas: The Ruthless King Who Became an Iranian Legend. I.B. Tauris. ISBN 978-0-85771-676-7.
- Brown, Christopher (1999). Van Dyck, 1599–1641. Rizzoli International Publications. pp. 1–359. ISBN 978-0-8478-2196-9.
- Canby, Sheila R. (2009). Shah ʻAbbas: The Remaking of Iran. British Museum Press. ISBN 978-0-7141-2452-0.
- Cave, Edward, ed. (1844). The Gentleman's Magazine. Vol. 22. John Bowyer Nichols and sons.
- Chick, H.; Matthee, Rudi, eds. (2012). Chronicle of the Carmelites in Persia: The Safavids and the Papal Mission of the 17th and 18th Centuries. I.B.Tauris. ISBN 978-0-85772-206-5.
- Christensen, Thomas (2012). 1616: The World in Motion. Counterpoint Press. ISBN 978-1-58243-774-3.
- Eskandari-Qajar, Manoutchehr (2011). Katouzian, Homa (ed.). "Persian Ambassadors, their Circassians, and the Politics of Elizabethan and Regency England". Iranian Studies. 44 (2). Routledge: 251–271. doi:10.1080/00210862.2011.541694. S2CID 153531886.
- Fathi, Jean (2017). "The Ottoman Empire: Arabic translation of the Syriac lament poem by Maphrian Ignatius Bar Qīqī". In Thomas, David; Chesworth, John A. (eds.). Christian-Muslim Relations. A Bibliographical History. Volume 10 Ottoman and Safavid Empires (1600–1700). Brill. ISBN 978-9004346048.
- Floor, Willem (2008). Titles and Emoluments in Safavid Iran: A Third Manual of Safavid Administration, by Mirza Naqi Nasiri. Mage Publishers. ISBN 978-1933823232.
- Globe, Alexander V. (1985). Peter Stent, London Printseller (circa 1642–1665). University of British Columbia Press. pp. 1–268. ISBN 978-0-7748-4141-2.
- Hannay, Margaret P. (2010). Mary Sidney, Lady Wroth. Routledge. p. 269. ISBN 978-0-7546-6053-8.
- Hearn, Karen (2009). Van Dyck and Britain. Tate Publishing. ISBN 978-1-85437-858-3.
- Herbert, Thomas (1638). Some yeares travels into Africa and Asia. R. Bip.
- Johnson, Samuel; Stevens, George, eds. (1813). The Plays of William Shakespeare (6th ed.). J. Nichols and Son.
- Lockhart, Laurence (1986). "European Contacts with Persia: 1350–1736". In Jackson, Peter; Lockhart, Laurence (eds.). The Cambridge History of Iran. Vol. 6: The Timurid and Safavid Periods. Cambridge University Press. pp. 373–412. ISBN 978-0521200943.
- Loosley, Emma (2012). "Ladies who Lounge: Class, Religion, and Social Interaction in Seventeenth-Century Isfahan". In Foxhall, Lin; Neher, Gabriele (eds.). Gender and the City before Modernity. John Wiley & Sons. pp. 1–272. ISBN 978-1-118-23445-7.
- Miller, Naomi J. (1996). Changing The Subject: Mary Wroth and Figurations of Gender in Early Modern England. University Press of Kentucky. ISBN 978-0813158846.
- Nocentelli, Carmen (2019). "Teresa Sampsonia Sherley: Amazon, Traveler, and Consort". In Akhimie, Patricia; Andrea, Bernadette (eds.). Travel and Travail: Early Modern Women, English Drama, and the Wider World. University of Nebraska Press. ISBN 978-1496202260.
- Schwartz, Gary (2013). "The Sherleys and the Shah: Persia as the Stakes in a Rogue's Gambit" (PDF). In Langer, Axel (ed.). The fascination of Persia: The Persian-European dialogue in seventeenth-century art & contemporary art of Teheran. Scheidegger and Spiess. pp. 78–99. ISBN 978-3858817396.
- Smyth, Patricia (2018). "Teresia, Countess of Shirley". VADS.
- Tuson, Penelope (2013). El Reyes, Abdulla (ed.). "Scholars and Amazons: Researching Women Travellers in the Arabian Gulf" (PDF). Liwa. 5 (9). National Center for Documentation & Research. ISSN 1729-9039. Archived from the original (PDF) on 30 November 2014.
- Wheelock, Arthur K. Jr.; Barnes, Susan J.; Held, Julius Samuel, eds. (1990). Anthony van Dyck. National Gallery of Art. ISBN 978-0-89468-155-4.
