= Portrait of Lady Theresa Shirley =

Painting by Anthony van Dyck

Portrait of Lady Shirley
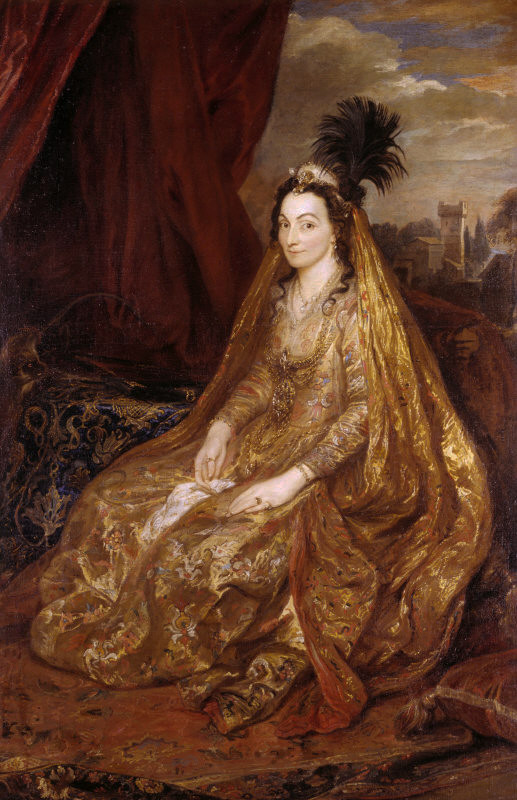
- Artist: Anthony van Dyck
- Year: 1622
- Dimensions: 200 cm × 133.4 cm (79 in × 52.5 in)
- Location: Petworth House; Petworth, West Sussex, England

The Portrait of Lady Shirley is a 1622 painting by Sir Anthony van Dyck, a Flemish Baroque artist. It is a portrait of Teresa Sampsonia (1589–1668), a Circassian noblewoman of the Safavid Empire of Iran. She was the wife of Elizabethan English adventurer Robert Shirley, whom she accompanied on his travels and embassies across Europe in the name of the Safavid King (Shah) Abbas the Great (r. 1588–1629). Numerous sketches of the couple appear in van Dyck's Italian Sketchbooks.

== The painting ==
The painting is full-length portrait with the seated subject portrayed in a Circassian dress in dull gold, embroidered with blue and red, with a cinnamon mantle, typical of her homeland. The painting itself measures about 200 cm in height and 133.4 cm in width. The portrait is one of set together with the Portrait of Sir Robert Shirley commissioned when the couple met van Dyck during a visit to Rome between 22 July and 29 August 1622. These portraits are now owned by Petworth House, a National Trust property in West Sussex.

== See also ==
- List of paintings by Anthony van Dyck
