= Portrait of Sir Robert Shirley =

Painting by Anthony van Dyck

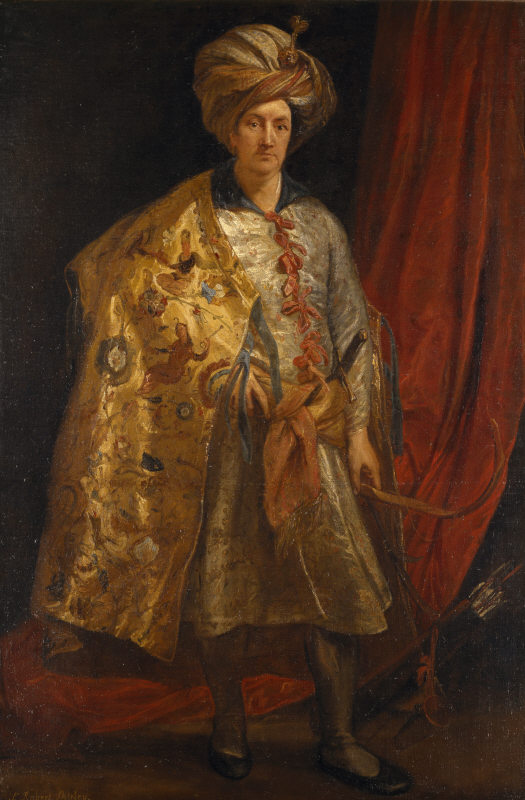
- Artist: Anthony van Dyck
- Year: 1622
- Dimensions: 200 cm × 133.4 cm (79 in × 52.5 in)
- Location: Petworth House; Petworth, West Sussex, England

The Portrait of Sir Robert Shirley is a painting by Sir Anthony van Dyck, a Flemish Baroque artist. It is a portrait of Sir Robert Shirley (c. 1581 – 13 July 1628), the ambassador to the Safavid Shah Abbas I (r. 1588–1629), beginning in 1608. This painting was completed in Rome in 1622 and is one of a pair; its pendant depicts Shirley's wife, Lady Teresa Sampsonia, a Circassian noblewoman. It is notable for the rich Persian dress worn by Shirley. Both of these paintings are now in the collection of Petworth House, in West Sussex.

== See also ==
- List of paintings by Anthony van Dyck
