= Huncks =

Huncks is a surname of English origin.

Notable people with the surname include:

- Henry Huncks (c. 1595-?), 10th Governor of Barbados
- Hercules Huncks (?-1660), regicide of King Charles I
