= Persian embassy to Europe =

Persian embassy to Europe may refer to:

- Persian embassy to Europe (1599–1602)
- Persian embassy to Europe (1609–1615)
