= Robert Phayre (regicide) =

Officer in the Irish Protestant and New Model Armies

Colonel Robert Phaire (1619?–1682) was an officer in the Irish Protestant and then the New Model armies and one of the regicides of Charles I of England. He was one of the three officers to whom the warrant for the execution of Charles I was addressed, but he escaped severe punishment at the Restoration by having married the daughter of Sir Thomas Herbert (1606–1682). He became a Muggletonian in 1662.

Among some of his descendants in the later 1700s the surname was modified to Phair however caution is recommended because some families who were not descendants (such as some of the surname Fair) also took on this spelling. The senior line (descendants of Onesiphorus), continued the spelling Phaire until the early 1800s when they restyled to Phayre).

== Early life ==
Phaire was born about 1619 (for on 24 March 1654 his age is reported as thirty-five), the son of the Revd Emmanuel Phaire from Devonshire, who had migrated to Ireland and in 1612 became rector of Kilshannig, county Cork.

== Irish insurrection ==
Both father and son were living Duhallow in county Cork in 1641 when the Irish Uprising started. They both sustained losses. Robert assessed his financial losses during this period amounted to £51 10s. Like many Protestants he joined Murrough O'Brien, 1st Earl of Inchiquin to fight the Confederates and by September 1646 he had risen to the rank of lieutenant-colonel in the regiment of Richard Townshend. In February 1648 he was arrested, with three other officers, for refusing to join the royalist rising under Inchiquin. On 4 October these four were exchanged for Inchiquin's son, and brought to Bristol in December by the Roundhead admiral William Penn. Phaire joined the New Model Army.

== Regicide ==
He was an officer in London in January 1649 and the warrant for the execution of Charles was addressed, on 29 January 1649, to Colonel Francis Hacker, Colonel Hercules Huncks, and Lieutenant-colonel Phaire. He was present on the 30th at Whitehall when the orders were drawn up for the executioner. However like Colonel Huncks, Phaire did not sign the order to the executioner.

== Cromwellian conquest of Ireland ==
In April 1649 he was given command of a Kentish regiment to join Cromwell's expedition to Ireland. In November the town of Youghal capitulated to him, and he was made one of the commissioners for settling Munster. On 10 April 1650, he took part, under Lord Broghill, in the victory at Macroom over the royalist forces under Boetius MacEgan, the Roman Catholic bishop of Ross. The next year (1651) he was appointed governor of County Cork, and held this office until 1654.

== Protectorate ==
He was a parliamentary republican, dissatisfied with the rule of the army officers, and unfriendly to the Protectorate. He seems to have retired to Rostellan Castle, County Cork. In 1656 Henry Cromwell reported that Phaire was attending Quaker meetings. He does not appear to have become a member of the Society of Friends, though one of his daughters (by his first wife) married a Quaker.

It is somewhat remarkable that Phaire himself married, as his second wife, Elizabeth, second daughter of Sir Thomas Herbert (1606–1682), was the faithful attendant on Charles I in his last hours. The marriage took place on 16 August 1658 at St Werburgh's, Dublin.

== Restoration ==
On 8 July 1659, shortly after the fall of the protectorate, the London-based Committee of Safety gave Phaire a commission as colonel of foot to serve under Ludlow in Ireland. At the Restoration, he was arrested in Cork (18 May 1660), and sent prisoner to Dublin. Thence he was removed to London, and sent to the Tower of London in June. He doubtless owed his life, and the easy treatment he experienced, to his connection with Sir Thomas Herbert; Bishop Clancarty, whose life he had spared, also pleaded for him. On 2 November (Hacker had been hanged on 19 October; Huncks had saved himself by giving evidence) he petitioned the privy council to release his estate from sequestration, and permit him to return to Ireland. This was not granted, but in December the sequestration was taken off his Irish estates, and he was given the liberty of the Tower on parole. On 3 July 1661, he was released for one month, on a bond of £2,000. He was not to go beyond the house and gardens of Sir Thomas Herbert, his father-in-law, in Petty France, Westminster. On 19 July another month's absence was permitted him, with leave to go to the country for his health. On 28 February 1662, he was allowed to remove to Sir Thomas Herbert's house for three months. After this he seems to have gained his liberty.

== Muggletonianism ==
It was during this period that he made the acquaintance of Lodowicke Muggleton, whose tenets he adopted. Sometime in 1662 he brought Muggleton to Sir Thomas Herbert's house and introduced him to his wife, who also became a convert. Their example was followed by their daughters Elizabeth and Mary, and their son-in-law, George Gamble, a merchant in Cork, and formerly a Quaker.

On 6 April 1665, Phaire was living at Cahermore, County Cork, when he was visited by Valentine Greatrakes, the stroker, who had served in his regiment in 1649. Greatrakes cured him in a few minutes of an acute ague. In 1666 Phaire was implicated in the abortive plot for seizing Dublin Castle. Both Phaire and his family corresponded with Muggleton. Phaire's first letter to Muggleton was dated 20 March 1670; his second letter (Dublin, 27 May 1675) was sent by Greatrakes, who was on a visit to London and Devon.

== Death ==
Phaire died at the Grange, near Cork, in 1682, probably in September. He was buried in the baptist graveyard at Cork. His will, dated 13 September 1682, was proved in November.

== Family ==
Phaire's first wife, whose name is not known, but is traditionally said to have been Gamble. They had several children:

- Onesiphorus (died 1702), who married Elizabeth Phaire
- Elizabeth, who married Richard Farmer.
- Mary, who married George Gamble (a Muggleton).

With his second wife Elizabeth, daughter of Sir Thomas Herbert, 1st Baronet, who was living on 25 May 1686 (the date of her last letter to Muggleton), Phaire had three sons and three daughters. The sons were:

- Thomas (died 1716), a Lieutenant-Colonel in the Army. He married Alicia Purdon, sister of Bartholomew Purdon, and had issue.
- Alexander Herbert (died 1752).
- John.
