= The Travels of the Three English Brothers =

Jacobean era stage play

The Travailes of the Three English Brothers. Sir Thomas Shirley. Sir Anthony Shirley. Mr. Robert Shirley. As It is Now Play'd by Her Maiesties Seruants.
- Author: John Day, William Rowley, George Wilkins
- Language: English
- Publisher: Printed by George Eld for John Wright
- Publication date: 1607
- Publication place: London, England
- Pages: 66 unnumbered pages
- OCLC: 84755601

The Travels of the Three English Brothers is an early Jacobean era stage play, an adventure drama written in 1607 by John Day, William Rowley, and George Wilkins. The drama was based on the true-life experiences of the three Shirley brothers, Sir Anthony Shirley, Sir Thomas Shirley, and Robert Shirley (later Sir Robert). The play illustrates the trend toward extreme topicality in some works of English Renaissance drama.

== Date and source ==
The play was based on an account of the Shirleys' travels by Anthony Nixon, published in pamphlet form and titled The Three English Brothers. (The Shirley brothers had been the subjects of two previous pamphlets, in 1600 and 1601; but Nixon's work is thought to have been backed by the Shirley family.) The pamphlet was entered into the Stationers' Register on 8 June 1607, and was published soon after. The play was entered into the Register less than two months later, on 29 June that year. This suggests that the three playwrights may have put the drama together in the space of about six weeks.

== Performance ==
The play was acted by Queen Anne's Men. Its 29 July Register entry states that the play was performed at the Curtain Theatre, though this information is likely inaccurate; The Queen's company is thought to have moved on to the Red Bull Theatre in 1604 or 1605. Francis Beaumont's The Knight of the Burning Pestle, also of 1607, refers to The Travels as a Red Bull play.

== Publication ==
The Travels was printed in the same year it appeared onstage, apparently to capitalize on its popularity. The text was issued in a quarto by the bookseller John Wright. Wright published the quarto in two states: the second added an Epistle addressed to the Shirley family. The work's topicality may have won it quick success, though that success was not enduring: the 1607 quarto was the only edition of the play in the seventeenth century. (The playwrights suffered the trap of the topical approach: their material was so current that they did not yet have an end to their story. Their version was soon outdated by further events and later printed accounts.)

== Authorship ==
The triple authorship of The Travels is not in doubt; in some versions of the work the three dramatists are credited by name on the title page, and all three signed the prefatory epistle to the Shirleys. In addition, it would likely have taken more than one or two writers to produce an actable play in a short period of time. Scholars have made attempts to differentiate the respective shares of the three authors. Since George Wilkins is thought by some to have worked with Shakespeare on Pericles, Prince of Tyre around 1607, the question of his participation in this collaboration has drawn the attention of some Shakespeare scholars. Wilkins probably wrote about three-fifths of The Travels.

(H. Dugdale Sykes, employing a 13-scene scheme for the play, assigned the Prologue to Day, the Epilogue to Day and Wilkins; he allotted scenes 2, 4, 5, 6, 8, 10, 12, and the start of 13 to Wilkins; he gave scene 3 to Day, and the remainder, scenes 1, 7, 9, 11, and the end of 13, to Day or Rowley. Sykes's breakdown resembles the conclusions of other researchers.)

== Genre ==
The Travels of the Three English Brothers belongs to a genre of traditional, popular, and somewhat naive drama of adventure and romance that was typified by the plays of Thomas Heywood and his many compatriots. (Concern with accuracy and veracity was not part of the ethos of this popular drama, and the three authors show no such concern in The Travels.) More sophisticated writers of the early Jacobean period looked down on this popular drama; Beaumont was mocking The Travels when he referred to it in Knight of the Burning Pestle, IV, i, 33-5.

Beyond the sheer entertainment value of the Shirleys' story, the dramatists were eager to draw cultural contrasts between Christian England and Muslim Persia, the key locale of much of the Shirley saga. Their play stresses the violence and brutality of Persian society (especially the practice of beheading) as a blatant discriminator between Persia and England. The English display their valor and resourcefulness when assaulted by violence and treachery; when an unarmed Sir Thomas Shirley is attacked by four Turks, he defends himself with rocks. The splendid English move the Persian "Sophy" (the play's version of the Shah) to verbal raptures – and inspire him to grant Christians tolerance in his dominions.

== Kempe ==
In addition to other real-life figures in the cast of characters (including the Pope), the comic Will Kempe appears in one scene. Himself noted for his travels, Kempe is shown in Venice, where he has a bawdy exchange with a Signor Harlakin (that is, harlequin) and his wife. Kempe reportedly met Sir Anthony Shirley in Rome; but whether this Venetian scene with Kempe is based on anything more substantial that the playwrights' imaginations is uncertain.

== The "perspective glass" ==
The final scene in The Travels of the Three English Brothers contains a noteworthy feature: the three Shirley brothers and their father, widely separate geographically, see and speak with each other through a magical device called a "perspective glass." This device is part of the traditional lore of magic, and occurs in other contexts: Robert Greene includes it in his Friar Bacon and Friar Bungay. Though the perspective glass operates thaumaturgically rather than technologically, it nonetheless provides a striking anticipation of modern communications.
