= Dodmore Cotton =

English diplomat (died 1628)

Sir Dodmore Cotton

English ambassador to Safavid Iran
- In office 1627–1628
- Appointed by: Charles I

Gentleman of the King's privy chamber
- Monarch: Charles I

Personal details
- Died: 23 July 1628
- Resting place: Qazvin, Safavid Iran
- Parents: Sir Robert Cotton (father); Elizabeth Dormer (mother)
- Education: King's College, Cambridge

Sir Dodmore Cotton (died 23 July 1628), was an English diplomat and the first accredited English ambassador to the court of Shah Abbas I of Persia, appointed by Charles I. (Note: At the time crowns of England Scotland and Ireland were in a personal union. However James I and Charles I styled themselves King of Great Britain and Ireland, and so the ambassador represented the interests of Charles as Sovereign of all three countries.)

== Biography ==
Dodmore Cotton was the third son of Sir Robert Cotton and Elizabeth, daughter of John Dormer. He matriculated from King's College, Cambridge in 1607, and that he was admitted to Lincoln's Inn Court in November 1608.

At court Dodmore obtained a position as a gentleman of the King's privy chamber, and so was well known to King Charles I when he was appointed ambassador to Shah Abbas I of Persia in 1627. He sailed in March in the Rose, an East Indiaman, for Gombrun (Bandar Abbas), in the Persian Gulf. He was accompanied by Thomas Herbert, Naqd Ali Beg (the former Persian ambassador to the Court of Saint James), and Sir Robert Shirley (an English advisor to Naqd Ali Beg).

Prior to the ill-fated mission to the Safavid Empire, Beg, who had been a failure in England, denounced Shirley. He committed suicide by opium overdose on the journey back out of fear of the Shah's response. After touching at the Cape of Good Hope, Madagascar, and Swali in Surat, the three Englishmen arrived in Gombrun on 10 January 1628. Cotton, with Herbert and Shirley in his train, then proceeded to Ashraf, where he had an audience with Shah Abbas I. They then visited Mount Taurus. They were initially well received by the Shah, but he changed his attitude toward Shirley and treated him extremely harshly. Shirley suddenly fell ill and died in Qazvin, and Dodmore died of severe dysentery a week later. He was buried at the Armenian cemetery in Qazvin. Herbert wrote that "the trials of the journey, and mortification over its fruitless result" no doubt contributed to the deaths.
