= Sheila R. Canby =

American art historian (1949–2025)

- Born: Sheila Randolph Canby; January 10, 1949; Wilmington, Delaware, U.S.
- Died: August 17, 2025 (aged 76); Milford, Delaware, U.S.
- Education: Vassar College, BA; Harvard University, MFA, PhD
- Occupation: Art historian
- Spouse: John Voss Jr. (m. 1978)
- Awards: Farabi International Award

Sheila Randolph Canby (January 10, 1949 – August 17, 2025) was an American art historian and curator. She was the curator of the Department of Islamic Art at the Metropolitan Museum of Art, New York and before that curator of Islamic art and antiquities at the British Museum. After her retirement, she was Curator Emeritus of the Department of Islamic Art at the Metropolitan Museum. She was a fellow of the Royal Asiatic Society.

== Early life ==
Sheila Canby was born on January 10, 1949, in Wilmington, Delaware. She earned her A.B. from Vassar College, summa cum laude, and her M.A. and Ph.D. from Harvard University.

== Career ==
Canby was the Metropolitan Museum of Art's curator of Islamic art from October 2009 to April 2019 and was a former curator of Islamic art and antiquities at the British Museum. She was a fellow of the Royal Asiatic Society. She also held positions at the Brooklyn Museum, Los Angeles County Museum of Art, Philadelphia Museum of Art, Fogg Art Museum, and the Museum of Fine Arts, Boston. She was a visiting lecturer at the School of Oriental and African Studies, London.

== Personal life and death ==
Canby married John Voss Jr. in 1978. They had one son. She died of lung cancer in Milford, Delaware, on August 17, 2025, at the age of 76.

== Selected publications ==
- Persian Painting. British Museum Press, London, 1993. ISBN 0714114596
- Rebellious Reformer: Drawings and Paintings of Riza-Yi 'Abbasi of Isfahan. Azimuth Editions, 1996. ISBN 1898592055
- Princes, Poets and Paladins: Islamic and Indian Paintings from the Collection of Prince and Princess Sadruddin Aga Khan. British Museum Press, London, 1998. ISBN 0714114839
- The Golden Age Of Persian Art 1501-1722. British Museum Press, London, 1999. ISBN 978-0714114682
- Safavid Art and Architecture. British Museum Press, London, 2002. (Editor) ISBN 9780714111520
- Hunt for Paradise: Court Arts of Safavid Iran 1501-76. Skira Editore, 2003. (Edited with Jon Thompson) ISBN 978-8884915900
- Islamic Art In Detail. British Museum Press, London, 2005. ISBN 978-0714124285
- Persian Love Poetry. British Museum Press, London, 2005. (With Vesta Sarkhosh Curtis) ISBN 071412429X
- Shah 'Abbas: The Remaking of Iran. British Museum Press, London, 2009. ISBN 978-0714124568
- Shah 'Abbas and The Treasures Of Imperial Iran. British Museum Press, London, 2009. ISBN 978-0714124551
- The Shahnama of Shah Tahmasp: The Persian Book of Kings. Yale University Press, New Haven, 2014. ISBN 978-0300194548
- Islamic Art: Close-Up. British Museum Press, London, 2015. ISBN 978-0714111896
