= Hercules Huncks =

Regicide of Charles I

- Born: 28 April 1601 (baptised); Stratford-on-Avon, Warwickshire
- Died: 1676 Lisburn, County Antrim
- Rank: Colonel
- Conflicts: Wars of the Three Kingdoms; Battle of Rathmines
- Spouse: Frances
- Children: Edward; Levina

Hercules Huncks (1601 – 1676) was a colonel in New Model Army of Parliament during the Wars of the Three Kingdoms. He was one of the king's guards at the execution of King Charles I of England and is sometimes listed as one of his regicides. However, he was not one of the king's judges, nor did he sign the king's death warrant; he was granted a pardon for his involvement in the execution. His military action in the war took place largely in Ireland.

== Family ==
Hercules Huncks was born to an armigerous family that traced its origins back to the 14th century in Gloucestershire, at Radbrooke. His father Thomas had inherited the manor of Preston on Stour (then in Gloucestershire) from his own grandfather, but in 1594, under financial difficulties, sold it. Thomas's wife was Katherine Conway, sister of Edward Conway, 1st Viscount Conway, Secretary of State in 1625, and it was through the connection with the Conways that the family retained any influence. The second Viscount Conway referred to Hercules as "Cousin Huncks".

Thomas Huncks served under Edward Conway as a soldier for the Dutch States-General, for which he was knighted (as Hunckes) in 1605. At least two of his sons were also knighted - Sir Henry Huncks, sometime Governor of Barbados, and Sir Fulke Huncks - both colonels in the Royalist forces of Charles I. The sons had little choice but military careers, as Thomas Huncks could not afford to advance them in any other profession. In 1616, he wrote his brother-in-law Edward Conway that he could not afford to support his son Foulke outside a career as a soldier.

Hercules, the fifth and youngest son, was baptised on 28 April 1601 at Stratford-upon-Avon. He married twice: first (as Hercules Honcksz ) in the Netherlands at Utrecht on 1 January 1630 to Elizabeth Boudeloot, and secondly in London to Frances Blundell, widow of Christopher Phillips, licence issued 10 May 1637. This marriage produced twin children - Edward and Levina - baptised at St Martin-in-the-Fields on 15 December 1641.

== Soldier ==
The record of his 1630 marriage in the Netherlands indicates that by that time he had followed his father into the Dutch service as a soldier during the Wars of the Low Countries. In 1633 he was definitely in the service of the States of the United Provinces, as on 20 March 1633, his nephew "Joseph Archibald" (Archbold - son of his sister Elinor Archbold) was issued a pass to visit him in Holland.

Huncks returned to the service of King Charles I during the Bishops' Wars against Scotland of 1639–1640. In June 1640 "Captain Hercules Hunks" was under the command of the Earl of Northumberland in His Majesty's army, taking delivery of 100 men of Lincolnshire impressed for military service.

However, he later became "one who had opposed with more than ordinary vehemence all those who were for the king." By August 1644, in the midst of the Civil War between the king and Parliament, Parliament's Captain Huncks was a prisoner of war at Belvoir Castle, where he was exchanged for a Royalist officer.

On 7 June 1647, Colonel Michael Jones landed in Ireland to take the island for Parliament, and Hercules Huncks was part of his army, as on 13 October 1648 his wife Frances was petitioning to receive his arrears of pay "from his service in Ireland, whither he has again returned to spend his dear blood for the good of that kingdom, while she has nothing left meantime for the maintenance of herself and her children." He had by that time been raised to the rank of colonel, and was appointed governor of Londonderry, replacing Lord Foliot.

== Execution of King Charles I ==
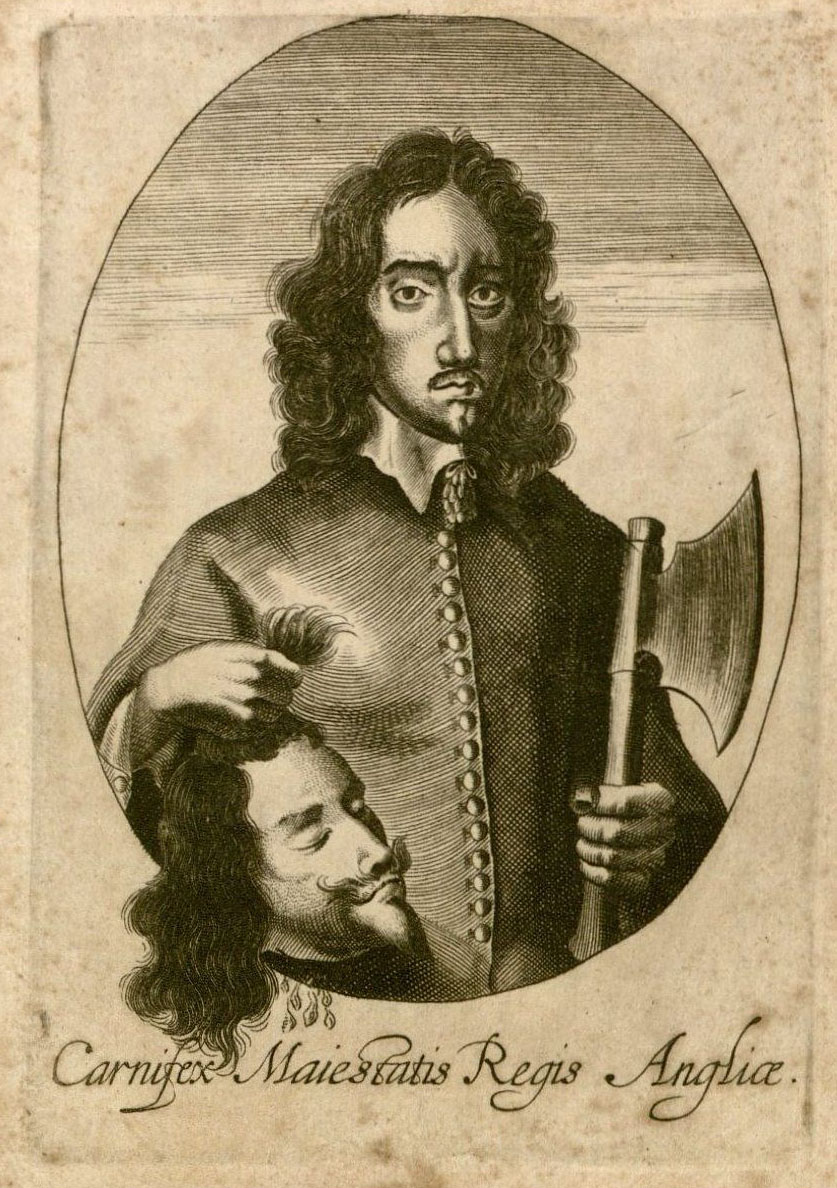
King Charles Beheaded

In January 1648/9, following the Trial of Charles I, Colonel Huncks, with Francis Hacker and Robert Phayre, was one of the senior army officers delegated to supervise and carry out the king's execution, and the king's death warrant was addressed to those three officers. However, Oliver Cromwell decided that an additional warrant explicitly addressed to the executioner was necessary and ordered Huncks to write and sign it. He refused. According to Hunck's own testimony at the trial of his fellow-officer Daniel Axtell, Cromwell called him a "froward, peevish fellow" and wrote out the warrant himself.

== Irish Conquest ==
Following the execution of the king, Parliament moved to send the army to complete the conquest of Ireland, offering allotments of confiscated Irish lands to settle the pay of the English soldiers, which were greatly in arrears. Cromwell accepted command of this expeditionary force on 30 March 1649. Colonel Huncks was in the vanguard of the force, commanding both a regiment of foot and a regiment of horse. Two of his companies were sent in advance to reinforce Londonderry in July, and the rest sailed with the main body of the army to Dublin, where the regiments of the vanguard, including Huncks', joined the forces of Parliamentary governor Colonel Jones for the decisive victory of the Battle of Rathmines on 2 August 1649.

Following the conquest, Huncks did receive a land grant, of Monkstown Castle Cork, which he sold, and by 1651 he was appointed Governor of Derry.

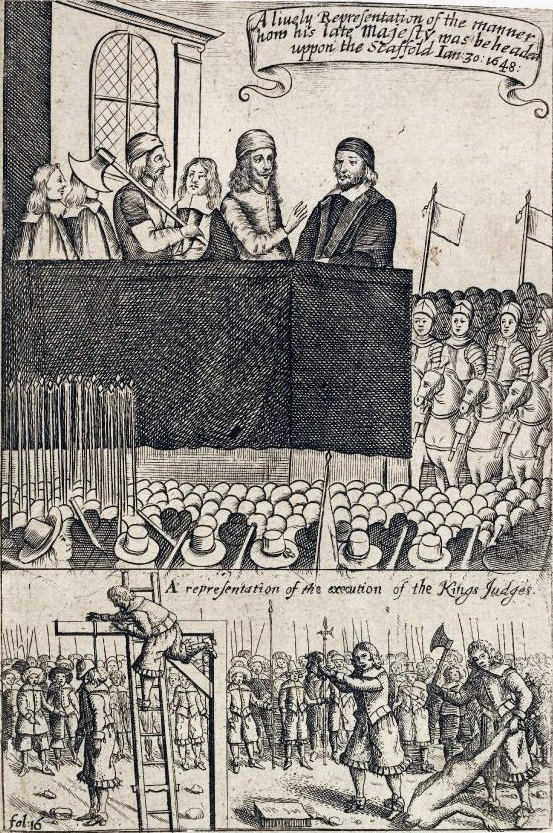
Execution of King Charles I and of regicides

== Restoration ==
On 15 October 1661, following the restoration of the monarchy, those persons deemed guilty of the former king's death were tried for treason. Huncks testified at the trial of Axtell, formerly his colleague as a guard of the king, that Axtell had urged him to sign the warrant to the king's executioner, which he had refused to do: "The ship is now coming into the harbor, will you strike sail before we come to anchor?" Both Axtell and Francis Hacker, who had signed the order to the executioner, were executed.

On 17 January 1661, a pardon was issued to Hercules Huncks:

Sir Geoffrey Palmer, Attorney-General, and Sir Heneage Finch, Solicitor-General, in their report on his petition consider him a penitent person and hope well of him in the future. He shall have the benefit of our Declaration in relation to his arrears and lands, notwithstanding a clause therein which excepts from its benefits all who were 'of the guard of halberdiers assisting to put the bloody sentence of death in execution upon the 30th January, 1648'

== Peace ==
He returned to Ireland, where he resided at Lisburn in Ulster, the seat of his Rawdon kinsmen, close connections of the Conways, who had been granted extensive lands in the area, from which they took the title Viscount Killultagh.

His daughter Levina married Hugh Montgomery of Ballylesson in County Down; they had a son Hercules Montgomery.

Hercules Huncks died at Lisburn in 1676. Administration of his estate was granted in 1676 at Lisburn, Ireland.

== Sources ==
- Finch, Heneage. The Indictment, Arraignment, Tryal, and Judgment, at large of twenty-nine Regicides. 1739.
- Gardiner, Samuel R. History Of The Great Civil War Vol. 4 (1647–1649) London: Longman, Green & CO., 1905.
- Gardiner, Samuel Rawson. History of the commonwealth and protectorate, 1649–1656. New York : AMS Press, 1965.
- Ludlow, Edmund. Memoirs, vol. 2. Oxford: The Clarendon Press, 1894. C D Firth, ed.
- Manganiello, Stephen C. The Concise Encyclopedia of the Revolutions and Wars of England, Scotland, and Ireland, 1639-1660, Scarecrow Press 2004, ISBN 0-8108-5100-8
- McNally, Michael. "Ireland 1649-52: Cromwell's Protestant Crusade (campaign) [PDF]" Osprey, 2009.
