= Sophy (Safavid Iran) =

Term for the ruler of the Safavid dynasty of Iran

The Sophy, also spelled Sofi, Sophie, Sophi, or Soffi, was a reference to the ruler of the Safavid dynasty of Iran. Even though Iran remained known in the West by the exonym Persia (see Name of Iran), which had been coined in "the days of the ancient Greeks", from the time of Shah Abbas I ("the Great"; r. 1588–1629), the ruler of the nation came to be known as the "Sophy", itself a corruption of the word "Safavi"—the dynasty to which Abbas I belonged.

Though the usage of "Sophy" gained much more prominence during Shah Abbas I's rule, the word was in use to refer to the Safavid ruler since the time of the dynasty's founder, Shah Ismail I (r. 1501–1524). Nevertheless, the term became personified by Shah Abbas I.

An extensive number of references to Persia and its "Sophy" in European literature start with the reign of Shah Abbas I and onwards. William Shakespeare's Twelfth Night (published 1602) is noted as being amongst the early attestments to this.

European depiction of Shah Ismail I with the title Sophi

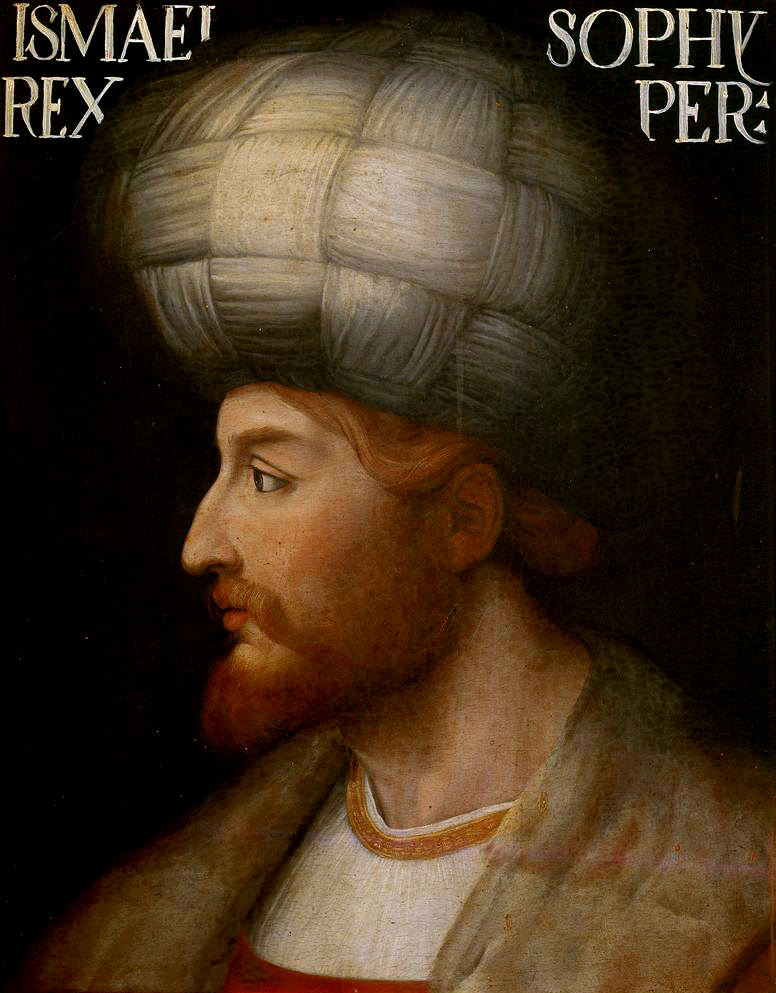
European painting of Shah Ismail I with the title Sophy

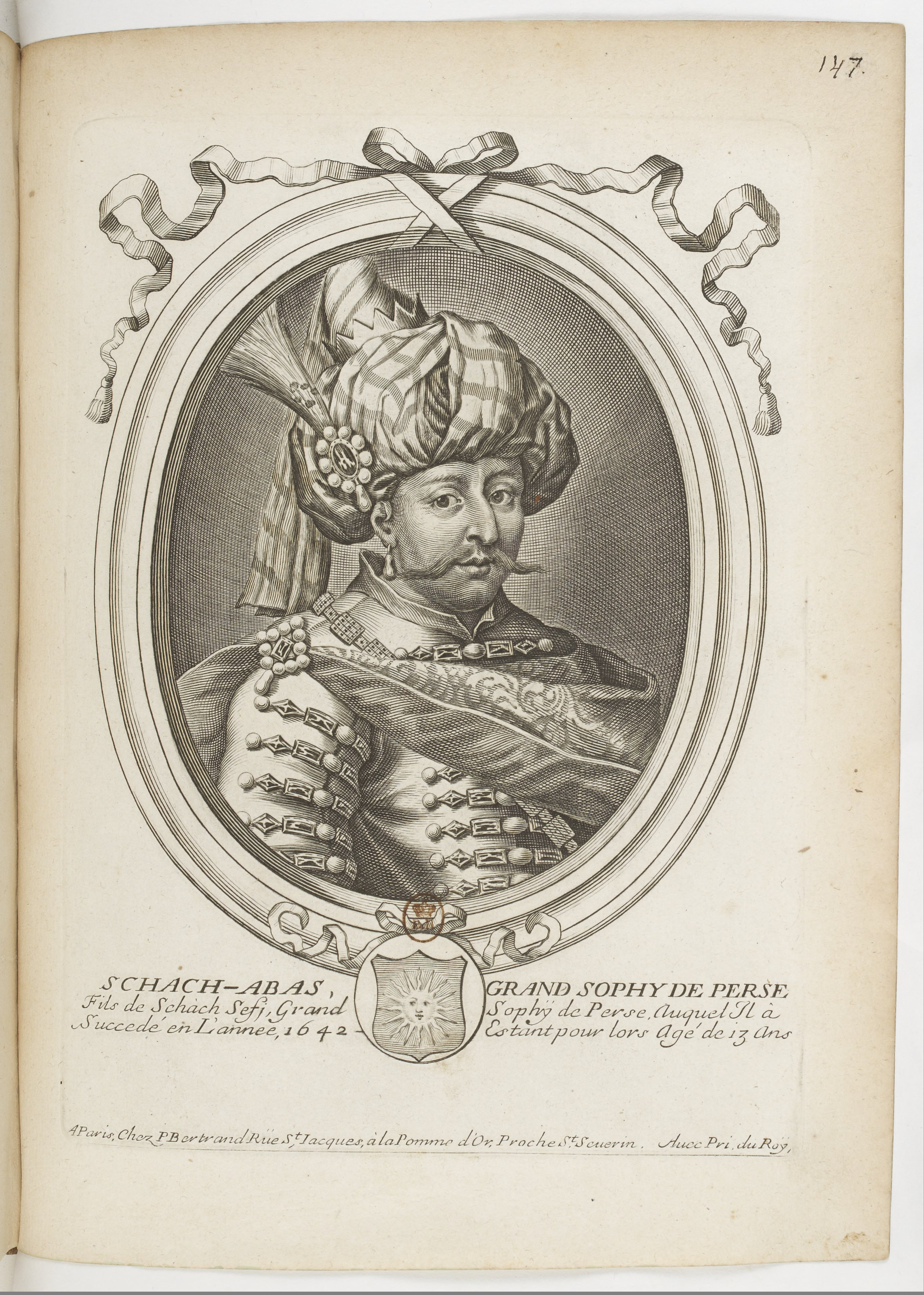
European engraving of Shah Abbas II with the title Grand Sophy de Perse

== Sources ==
- Blow, David (2009). Shah Abbas: The Ruthless King Who Became an Iranian Legend. I.B.Tauris. ISBN 978-0857716767.
- Floor, Willem (2001). Safavid Government Institutions. Costa Mesa, California: Mazda Publishers. ISBN 978-1568591353.
- Matthee, Rudi (2023). "The wrath of God or national hero? Nader Shah in European and Iranian historiography". Journal of the Royal Asiatic Society: 1–19. doi:10.1017/S1356186322000694.
- Savory, Roger (2007). Iran Under the Safavids. Cambridge University Press. p. 259. ISBN 978-0521042512.
