= Persian embassy to Europe (1609–1615) =

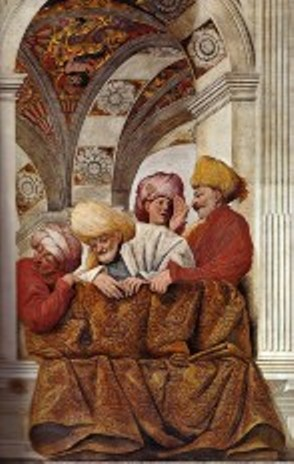
Fresco of the Persian embassy visiting Pope Paul V in Rome, painted in 1615–1616. Sala dei Corazzieri, Palazzo del Quirinale, Rome

The Persian embassy to Europe (1609–1615) was dispatched by the Persian Shah Abbas I in 1609 to obtain an alliance with Europe against the Ottoman Empire. The embassy was led by the Englishman Robert Shirley.

== Background ==
The Safavid Persians had then been at war with their archrivals, the neighbouring Ottoman Empire, for more than a century, and so decided to try to obtain European help against the Ottomans. Besides the territorial antagonism of the Ottoman and Persian realms, there was also strong religious antagonism, as the Persians proclaimed Shiism against the Ottoman Empire's Sunnism. These Persian efforts at rapprochement with Catholic Europe (Spain, the Habsburg Empire, and Italy), attempted to counterbalance the Franco-Ottoman alliance (between France and the Ottoman Empire), and came at a time when Persia was in direct conflict against the Ottoman Empire in the Ottoman–Safavid War (1603–1618). This embassy followed the 1599–1602 Persian embassy to Europe.

== Embassy ==
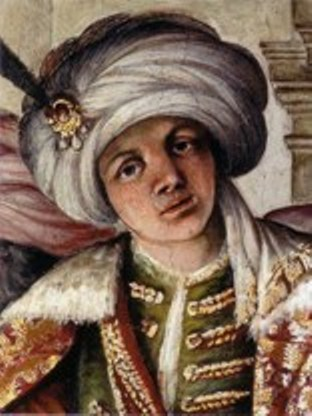
Fresco detail of Robert Shirley visiting Pope Paul V, Sala dei Corazzieri, Palazzo del Quirinale, Rome. Painted in 1615–1616.

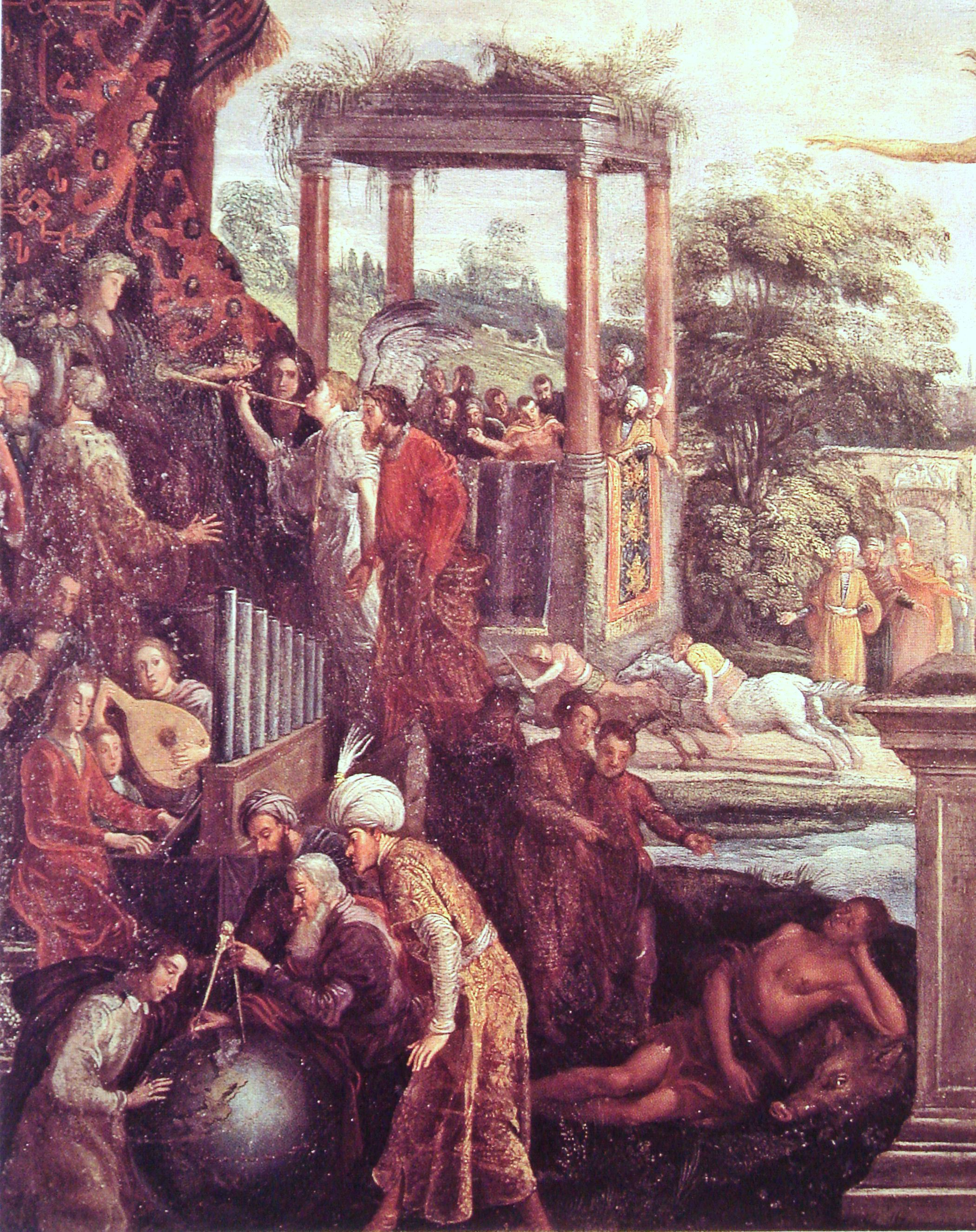
Abbas I as a new Caesar being honoured by the Trumpets of Fame, together with the Persian embassy, in Allégorie de l'Occasion, by Frans II Francken, 1628.

The embassy went to Kraków, Prague, Florence, Rome, Madrid, London, and returned to Persia through the Great Mogul's India. Shirley was extremely well received in these countries, which were in regular conflict with the Ottoman Empire. The reception in Kraków was excellent and in Prague, Shirley was made a Count Palatine of the Holy Roman Empire by Rudolf II in 1609. He then continued to Florence, Milan and Rome, where he was received by Pope Paul V. He then continued to Spain.

In 1611, Shirley reached England, but he was opposed by the Levant Company, which had strong interests with Ottomans.

Shirley then returned to Persia by sea, through the Cape of Good Hope to land in India, at the mouth of the Indus, escaping from an attempt on his life by the Portuguese. He finally returned to Ispahan with his wife in 1615. All his traveling companions however had died on the way in a poisoning conspiracy.

== Aftermath ==
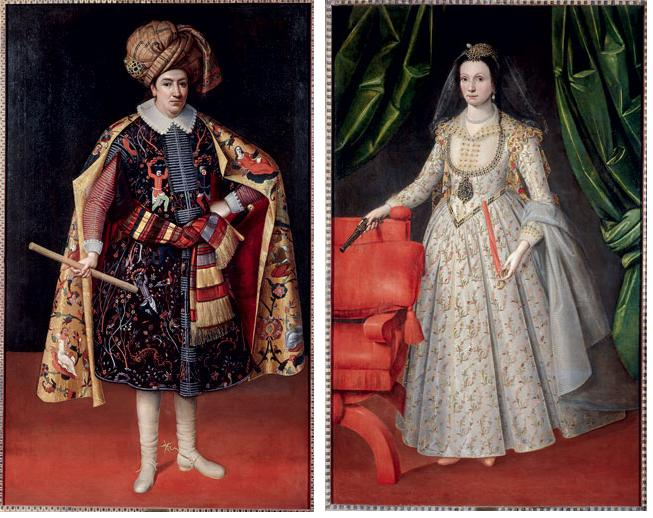
Robert Shirley and his Circassian wife Teresia, c. 1624–1627. Robert Shirley modernized the Persian army, and led the 1609–1615 embassy to Europe.

In 1616, a trade agreement was reached between Shah Abbas and the East India Company and in 1622 "a joint Anglo-Persian force expelled the Portuguese and Spanish traders from the Persian Gulf" in the Capture of Ormuz.

In 1624, Robert Shirley led another embassy to England in order to obtain trade agreements.

== See also ==
- Habsburg-Persian alliance
- Persian embassy to Louis XIV
