= Robert Shirley =

English soldier, diplomat and adventurer (c.1581-1628)

Sir Robert Shirley
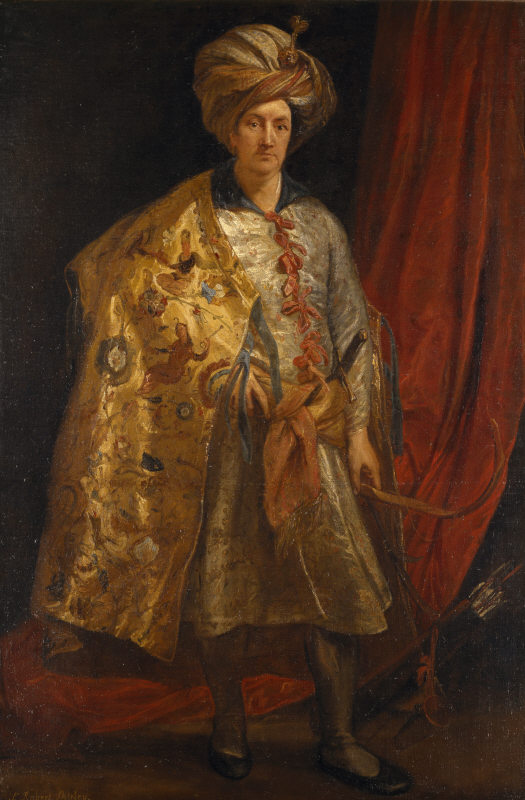
- Sir Robert Shirley by Anthony van Dyck, 1622.

Safavid ambassador to Europe
- In office 1609–1615
- Monarch: Abbas the Great

Personal details
- Born: 13 July 1581
- Died: 1628 (aged 46–47) Qazvin, Safavid Iran
- Spouse: Teresa Sampsonia
- Parents: Sir Thomas Shirley (father); Anne Kempe (mother)
- Relatives: Thomas Shirley (brother); Anthony Shirley (brother)
- Known for: Modernisation of Safavid Army; Persian embassy to Europe

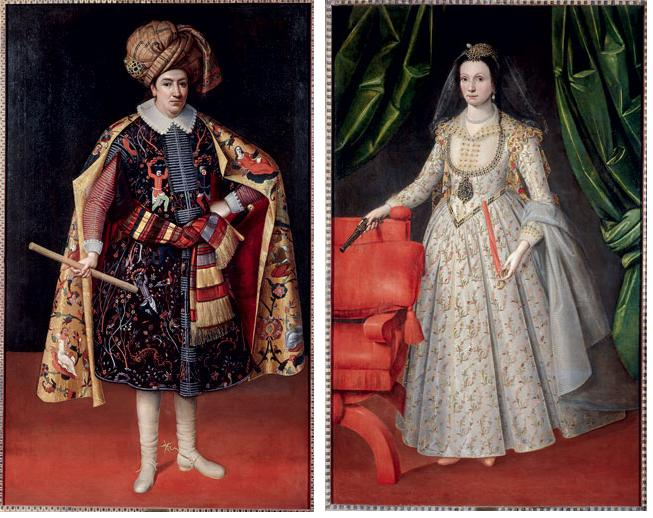
Double portrait of Robert Shirley and his Circassian wife Teresia, c.1624–1627. He wears the exotic Persian clothes which so impressed his European hosts upon his return to Europe from Persia; she wears her native style of dress but also holds a flintlock pistol and a pocket watch, symbols of the technologies Europe was introducing to Persia.

Robert Shirley (or Sherley; 1628 (aged 46–47) , birth date July 13) was an English traveller and adventurer, younger brother of Anthony Shirley and Thomas Shirley. He is notable for his role in modernizing and improving the Military of Safavid Iran in accordance with the English model at the request of Emperor Abbas the Great. This proved to be highly successful, as from then on the Safavids proved to be an equal force to their archrival, the Ottoman Empire.

== Family ==
Robert Shirley was the third son of Thomas Shirley of Wiston, West Sussex, and Anne Kempe, the daughter of Thomas Kempe (d. 7 March 1591) of Olantigh in Wye, Kent. He had two elder brothers, Thomas Shirley and Anthony Shirley, and six sisters who survived infancy.

== Career ==
Shirley travelled to Persia in 1598, accompanying his brother, Anthony, who had been sent to Safavid Iran from 1 December 1599 to May 1600, with 5000 horses to train the army according to the rules and customs of the English militia and to reform and retrain the artillery. When Anthony Shirley left, Robert remained with fourteen other Englishmen. There, in February 1607, he married an Eastern Orthodox Christian (Note: Greek or Georgian Orthodox) woman, Sampsonia, a Circassian slave related to the emperor. After being baptized into the Catholic Church by the Carmelites, she adopted the name Teresa for Teresa of Ávila, founder of the order, in addition to her own name. She became known in the west by the name Lady Shirley, Teresa Sampsonia.

In 1608, Emperor Abbas the Great sent Robert on a diplomatic mission to James VI and I, the king of the three states of England, Scotland, and Ireland, and to other European princes for the purpose of uniting them in an alliance against the Ottoman Empire. From his very first mission in Persia, the modernisation of the army by Robert and his men proved to be highly successful; the Safavids scored their first crushing victory over the Ottomans in the Ottoman–Safavid War (1603–1612), ending it on highly favourable terms.

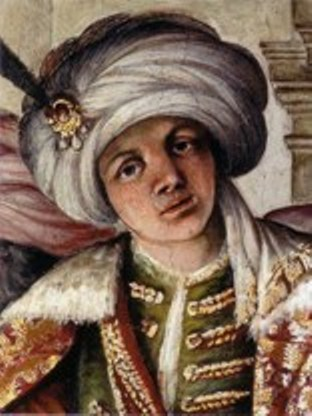
Painting of Robert Shirley visiting Pope Paul V in 1611, Sala dei Corazzieri, Palazzo del Quirinale, Rome. Painted in 1615–1616

Shirley travelled first to the Polish–Lithuanian Commonwealth, where he was received by Sigismund III Vasa. In June of that year, he arrived in Germany, where he was granted the title of count palatine and appointed a Knight of the Holy Roman Empire by Rudolf II, Holy Roman Emperor. Pope Paul V also conferred upon him the title of count. From Germany, Sir Robert travelled to Florence and then Rome, where he entered the city on Sunday, 27 September 1609, attended by a suite of eighteen persons. He next visited Milan and then proceeded to Genoa, from which he embarked for Habsburg Spain, arriving in Barcelona in December 1609. He sent for his wife, and they remained in Spain, principally at Madrid, until the summer of 1611.

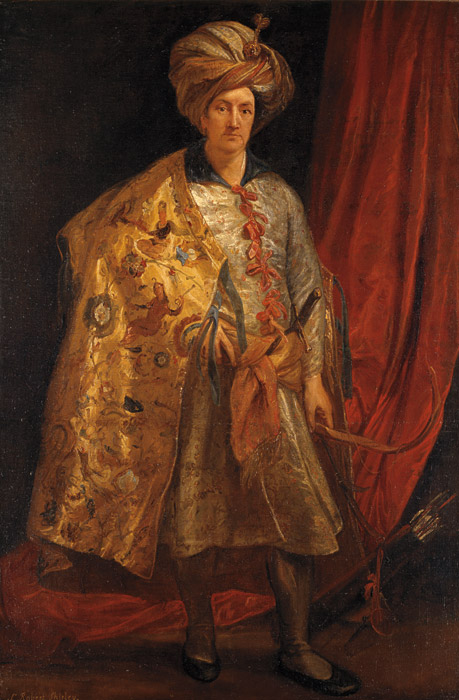
Sir Robert Shirley, by Anthony van Dyck, painted in Rome in 1622

In 1613, Shirley returned to Persia. In 1615, he returned to Europe and resided at Madrid. In a pleasingly serendipitous meeting, Shirley's caravan encountered Thomas Coryate, the eccentric traveller and travel writer and attendant of Henry Frederick, Prince of Wales's court in London, in the Central Persian desert basins in 1615.

Shirley's third journey to the Safavid Empire was undertaken in 1627, when he accompanied Dodmore Cotton, the first English ambassador to the Safavids. He died soon after arrival of dysentery in Qazvin (now northwest Iran). After being initially buried there, his remains were later moved from Qazvin to Rome in 1658 by his wife Teresia following her retirement to a convent of the Carmelites in the same city attached to Santa Maria della Scala. She died there in 1668.

== In art ==
There are several double portraits of Shirley and his wife in English collections, including the private collection of R. J. Berkeley and of Petworth House (by van Dyck).

== In literature ==
The exploits of the Shirley brothers were dramatised in the 1607 play The Travels of the Three English Brothers by John Day, William Rowley and George Wilkins.

In 1609, Andreas Loeaechius (Andrew Leech), a Scot living in Kraków, Poland, wrote a Latin panegyric to Shirley entitled Encomia Nominis & Neoocij D. Roberti Sherlaeii. This text was translated in the same year by the English writer Thomas Middleton as Sir Robert Sherley his Entertainment in Cracovia.

== See also ==
- García de Silva Figueroa
- Safavid dynasty
- Military history of Iran
