= Topkapı Palace =

Palace museum in Istanbul, Turkey

- Turkish: Topkapı Sarayı; Ottoman Turkish: طوپقپو سرايى
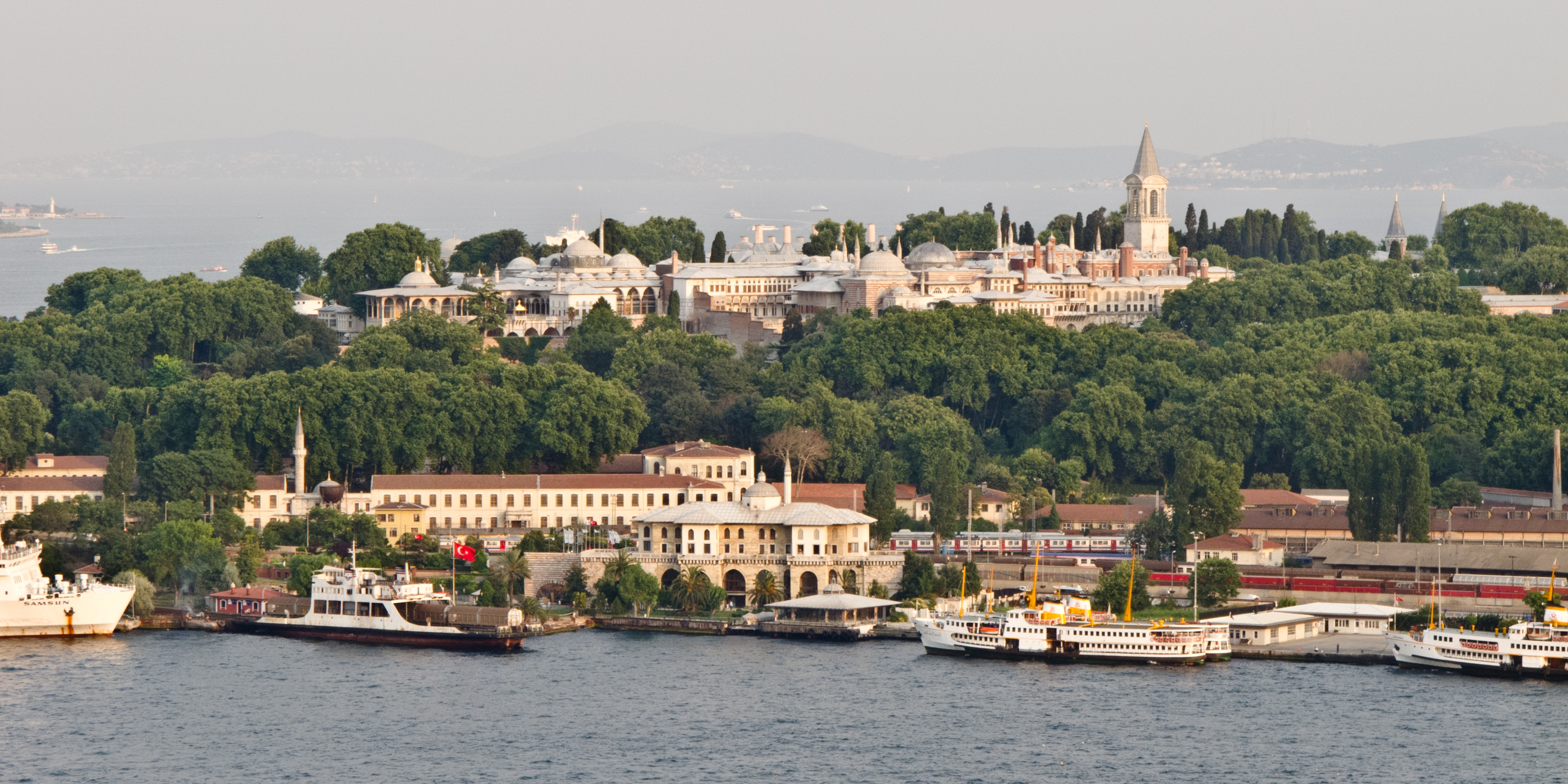
- View of the Topkapı Palace from the Golden Horn

General information
- Type: Royal residence (1478–1853); Accommodation for ranked officers (1853–1924); Museum (1924–present)
- Architectural style: Ottoman, Baroque
- Location: Istanbul, Turkey
- Coordinates: 41°0′46.8″N 28°59′2.4″E
- Construction started: 1459
- Completed: 1465
- Client: Ottoman sultans
- Owner: Turkish state

Technical details
- Structural system: Various low buildings surrounding courtyards, pavilions and gardens
- Size: 59,260 to 70,000 m^{2} (637,900 to 753,500 sq ft)

Design and construction
- Architects: Mehmed II, Alaüddin, Davud Ağa, Mimar Sinan, Sarkis Balyan

UNESCO World Heritage Site
- Part of: Historic Areas of Istanbul
- Criteria: Cultural: i, ii, iii, iv
- Reference: 356
- Inscription: 1985 (9th Session)

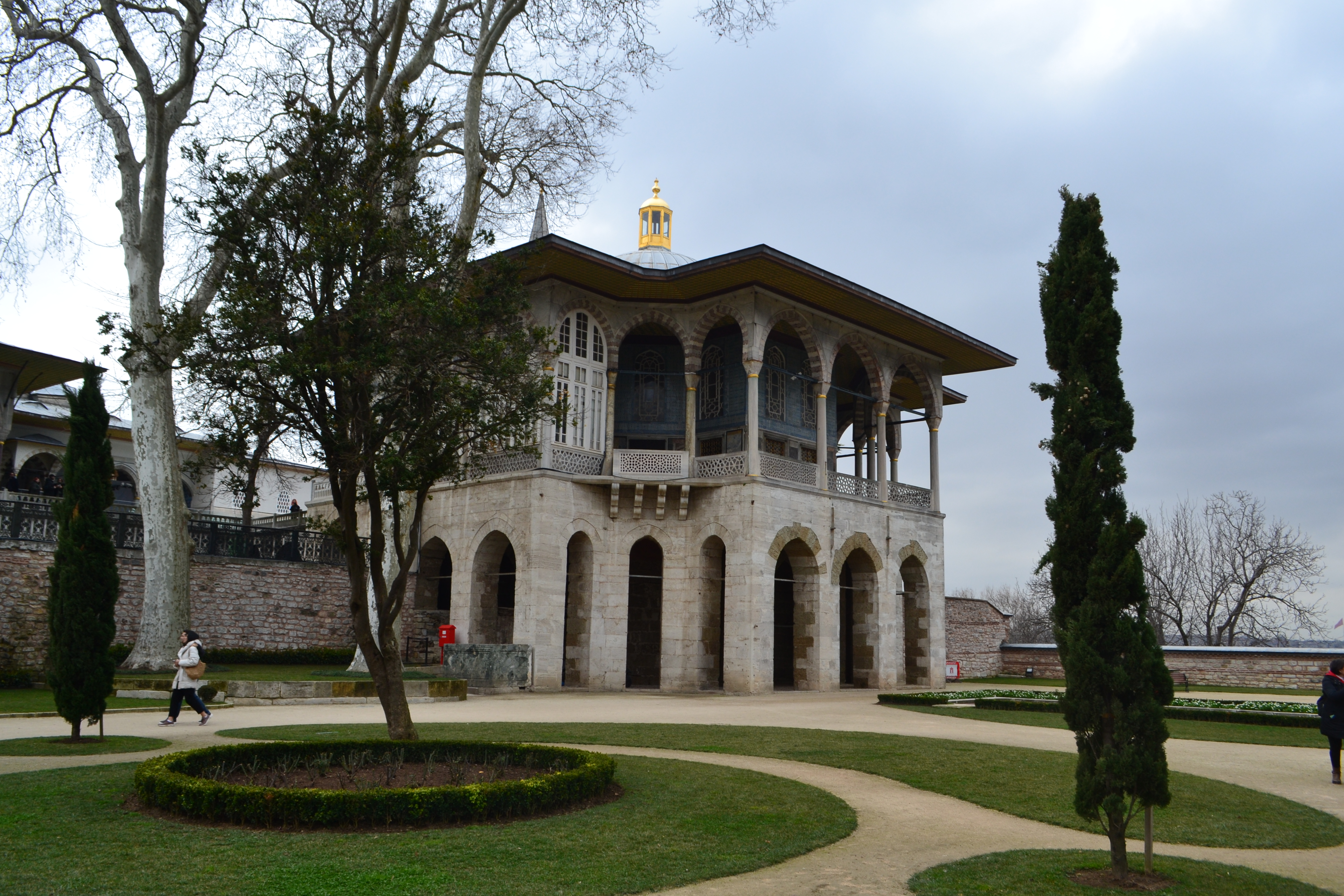
Bağdat Köşkü, or Kiosk of Baghdad, located in Topkapı Palace, It was built under Sultan Murad IV.

The Topkapı Palace (Note: Turkish: Topkapı Sarayı; Ottoman Turkish: طوپقپو سرايى, romanized: ṭopḳapu sarāyı, lit. 'Cannon Gate Palace') or the Seraglio, is a large museum and library in the east of the Fatih district of Istanbul in Turkey. From the 1460s to the completion of Dolmabahçe Palace in 1853, it served as the administrative center of the Ottoman Empire, and was the main residence of its sultans.

Construction, ordered by the Sultan Mehmed the Conqueror, began in 1459, six years after the conquest of Constantinople. Topkapı was originally called the "New Palace" (Yeni Saray or Saray-ı Cedîd-i Âmire) to distinguish it from the Old Palace (Eski Saray or Sarây-ı Atîk-i Âmire) in Beyazıt Square. It was given the name Topkapı, meaning Cannon Gate, in the 19th century. The complex expanded over the centuries, with major renovations after the 1509 earthquake and the 1665 fire. The palace complex consists of four main courtyards and many smaller buildings. Female members of the Sultan's family lived in the harem, and leading state officials, including the Grand Vizier, held meetings in the Imperial Council building.

After the 17th century, Topkapı gradually lost its importance. The sultans of that period preferred to spend more time in their new palaces along the Bosphorus. In 1856 Sultan Abdulmejid I decided to move the court to the newly built Dolmabahçe Palace. Topkapı retained some of its functions, including the imperial treasury, library and mint.

After the end of the Ottoman Empire in 1923, a government decree dated April 3, 1924 transformed Topkapı into a museum. Turkey's Ministry of Culture and Tourism now administers the Topkapı Palace Museum. The palace complex has hundreds of rooms and chambers, but only the most important are accessible to the public as of 2020, including the Ottoman Imperial Harem and the treasury, called hazine where the Spoonmaker's Diamond and the Topkapi Dagger are on display. The museum collection also includes Ottoman clothing, weapons, armor, miniatures, religious relics, and illuminated manuscripts such as the Topkapı manuscript. Officials of the ministry as well as armed guards of the Turkish military guard the complex. The Topkapı Palace forms a part the Historic Areas of Istanbul, a group of sites in Istanbul that UNESCO recognised as a World Heritage Site in 1985.

== Name ==
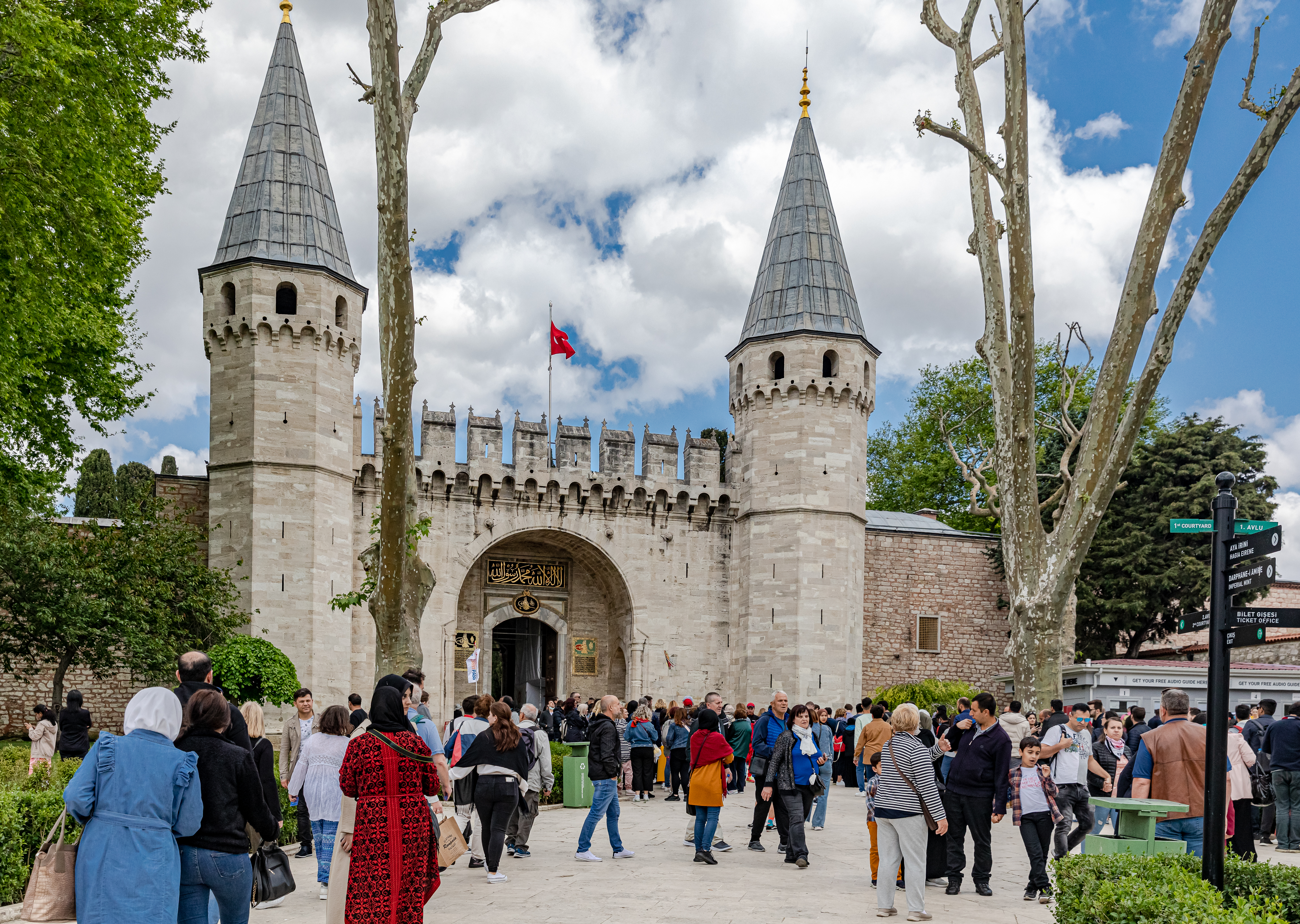
Gate of Salutation

The name of the palace was Saray-i Cedid-i Amire (Ottoman Turkish: سرای جديد عامره, 'Imperial New Palace') until the 18th century. The palace received its current name during Mahmud I's reign; when Topkapusu Sâhil Sarâyı, the seaside palace, was destroyed in a fire its name was transferred to the palace. In Turkish the current name of the palace, Topkapı, means 'Cannon Gate'.

== History ==
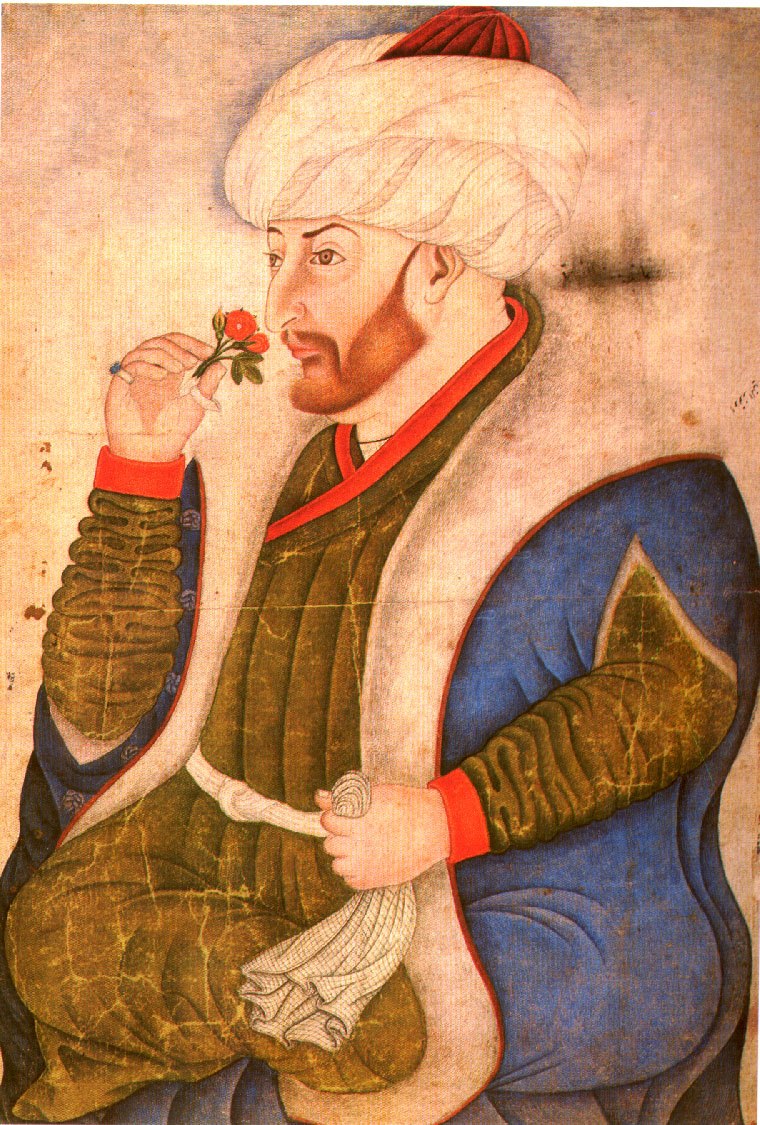
Sultan Mehmed II ordered the initial construction around the 1460s

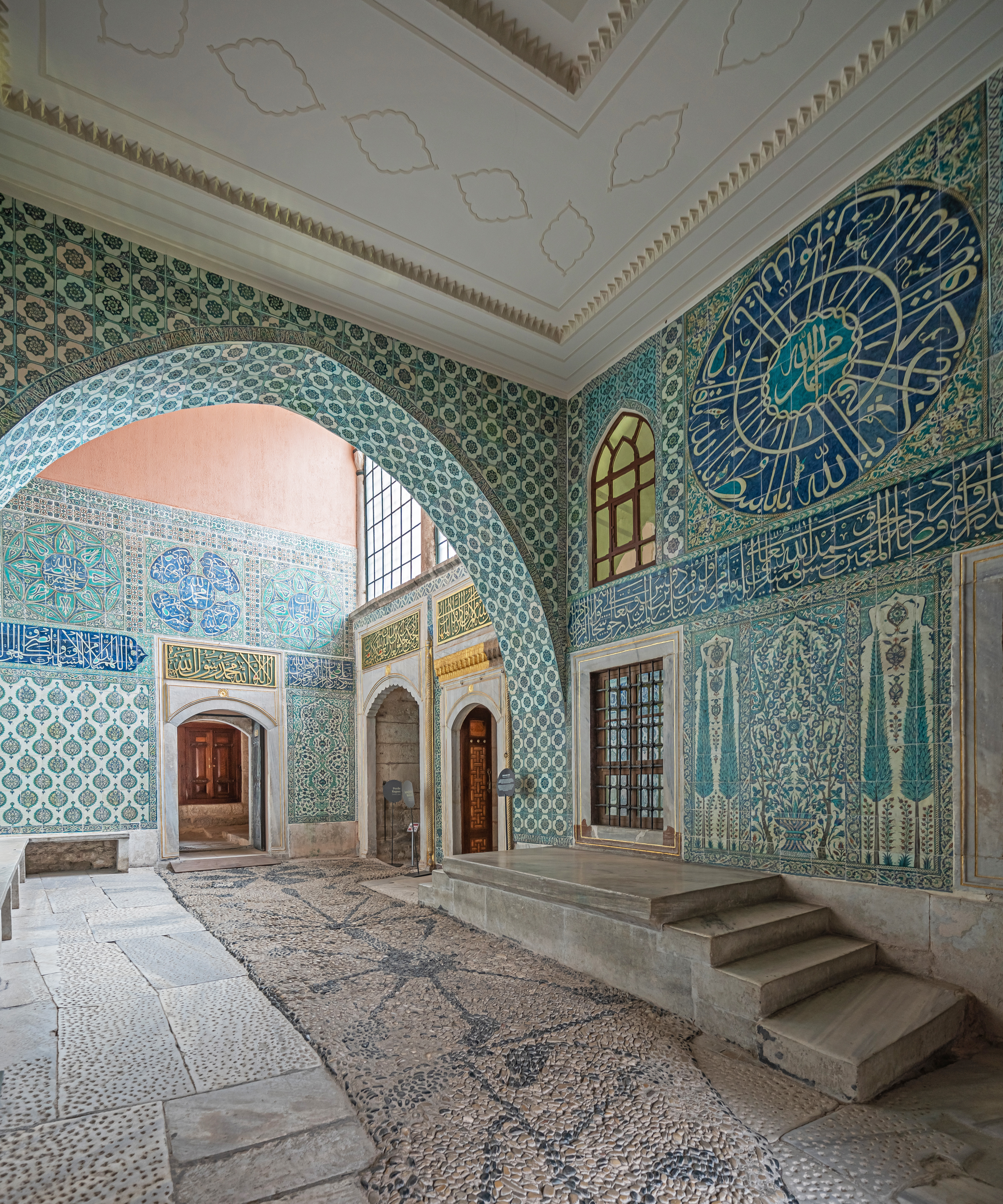
Inside the Harem.

The palace complex is located on the Seraglio Point (Sarayburnu, سرای بورونی), a promontory overlooking the Golden Horn, where the Bosphorus Strait meets the Sea of Marmara. The terrain is hilly and the palace itself is located at one of the highest points close to the sea. During Greek and Byzantine times, the acropolis of the ancient Greek city of Byzantion stood here.

After Sultan Mehmed II's conquest of Constantinople (known since 1930 in English as Istanbul) in 1453, the Great Palace of Constantinople was largely in ruins. The Ottoman court was initially set up in the Old Palace (Eski Saray, اسكی سرای), today the site of Istanbul University in Beyazit Square. Mehmed II ordered that construction of Topkapı Palace begin in 1459. According to an account of the contemporary historian Critobulus of Imbros the sultan "took care to summon the very best workmen from everywhere – masons and stonecutters and carpenters ... For he was constructing great edifices which were to be worth seeing and should in every respect vie with the greatest and best of the past." Accounts differ as to when construction of the inner core of the palace started and was finished. Critobulus gives the dates 1459–1465; other sources suggest construction was completed in the late 1460s.

Mehmed II established the basic layout of the palace. His private quarters would be located at the highest point of the promontory. Various buildings and pavilions surrounded the innermost core and winded down the promontory towards the shores of the Bosphorus. The entire complex was surrounded by high walls, some of which date back to the Byzantine acropolis. This basic layout governed the pattern of future renovations and extensions. The layout and appearance of Topkapı Palace was unique amongst not only European travellers, but also Islamic or oriental palaces. European travellers described it as "irregular, asymmetric, non-axial, and [of] un-monumental proportions". Ottomans called it "The Palace of Felicity". A strict, ceremonial, codified daily life ensured imperial seclusion from the rest of world. One of the central tenets was the observation of silence in the inner courtyards. The principle of imperial seclusion is a tradition that was codified by Mehmed II in 1477 and 1481 in the Kanunname Code, which regulated the rank order of court officials, the administrative hierarchy, and protocol matters. This principle of increased seclusion over time was reflected in the construction style and arrangements of various halls and buildings. The architects had to ensure that even within the palace, the sultan and his family could enjoy a maximum of privacy and discretion, making use of grilled windows and building secret passageways.

Later sultans made various modifications to the palace, though Mehmed II's basic layout was mostly preserved. The palace was significantly expanded between 1520 and 1560, during the reign of Suleyman the Magnificent. The Ottoman Empire had expanded rapidly and Suleyman wanted his residence to reflect its growing power. The Palace experienced a Greater expansion after Suleiman's wife and Haseki sultan of the Ottoman Empire at that time, Hurrem Sultan, decided to permanently shift Ottoman Imperial Harem to Topkapi palace after a great fire destroyed the Old Palace in 1541 and thereby to increase her authority and influence upon the Ottoman Empire's state as well as foreign affairs. This was a significant break from established customs, as Mehmed the Conqueror had specifically issued a decree to the effect that no women would be allowed to reside in the same building where government affairs were conducted. From that time, Topkapi not only served as the administrative center of the Ottoman Empire but also as the Imperial Residence of the Sultan, his entire family and as the center of the Imperial Harem of the Empire. The palace experienced a great expansion, with the Harem covering a huge portion of the Palace, it contained more than 400 rooms. After Hürrem resided at Topkapı it became known as the New Palace (saray-ı jedid). The chief architect in this period was the Persian Alaüddin, also known as Acem Ali. He was also responsible for the expansion of the Harem. In 1574, after a great fire destroyed the kitchens, Mimar Sinan was entrusted by Sultan Selim II to rebuild the damaged parts of the palace. Mimar Sinan restored and expanded not only the damaged areas, but also the Harem, baths, the Privy Chamber and various shoreline pavilions.

By the end of the 16th century, the palace had acquired its present appearance. The palace is an extensive complex rather than a single monolithic structure, with an assortment of low buildings constructed around courtyards, interconnected with galleries and passages. Few of the buildings exceed two stories. Seen from above, the palace grounds are divided into four main courtyards and the harem. The first courtyard was the most accessible, while the fourth courtyard and the harem were the most inaccessible. Access to these courtyards was restricted by high walls and controlled with gates. Apart from the four to five main courtyards, various other small to mid-sized courtyards exist throughout the complex. Estimates of the total size of the complex varies from around 592,600 m^{2} (146.4 acres) to 700,000 m^{2} (173 acres).

To the west and south the complex is bordered by the large imperial flower park, known today as Gülhane Park. Various related buildings such as small summer palaces (kasır), pavilions, kiosks (köşk) and other structures for royal pleasures and functions formerly existed along the shore in an area associated with the palace's outer gardens, but many disappeared over time, particularly after the construction of the shoreline railway in the 19th century. The last remaining seashore structure is the Basketmakers' Kiosk (Sepetçiler Kasrı), rebuilt under Sultan Ibrahim in 1643.

Topkapi Palace remained as the administrative center of the empire and also as the Imperial residence of Sultans and Ottoman Royal family for centuries until the completion of Dolmabahçe Palace in 1856. The new Palace was constructed by Sultan Abdülmecid I as the medieval Topkapı was lacking in contemporary style, luxury, and comfort, as compared to the palaces of the European monarchs. Abdülmecid decided to build a new modern palace near the site of the former Beşiktaş Sahil Palace, which was demolished.

Overview map of the courtyards

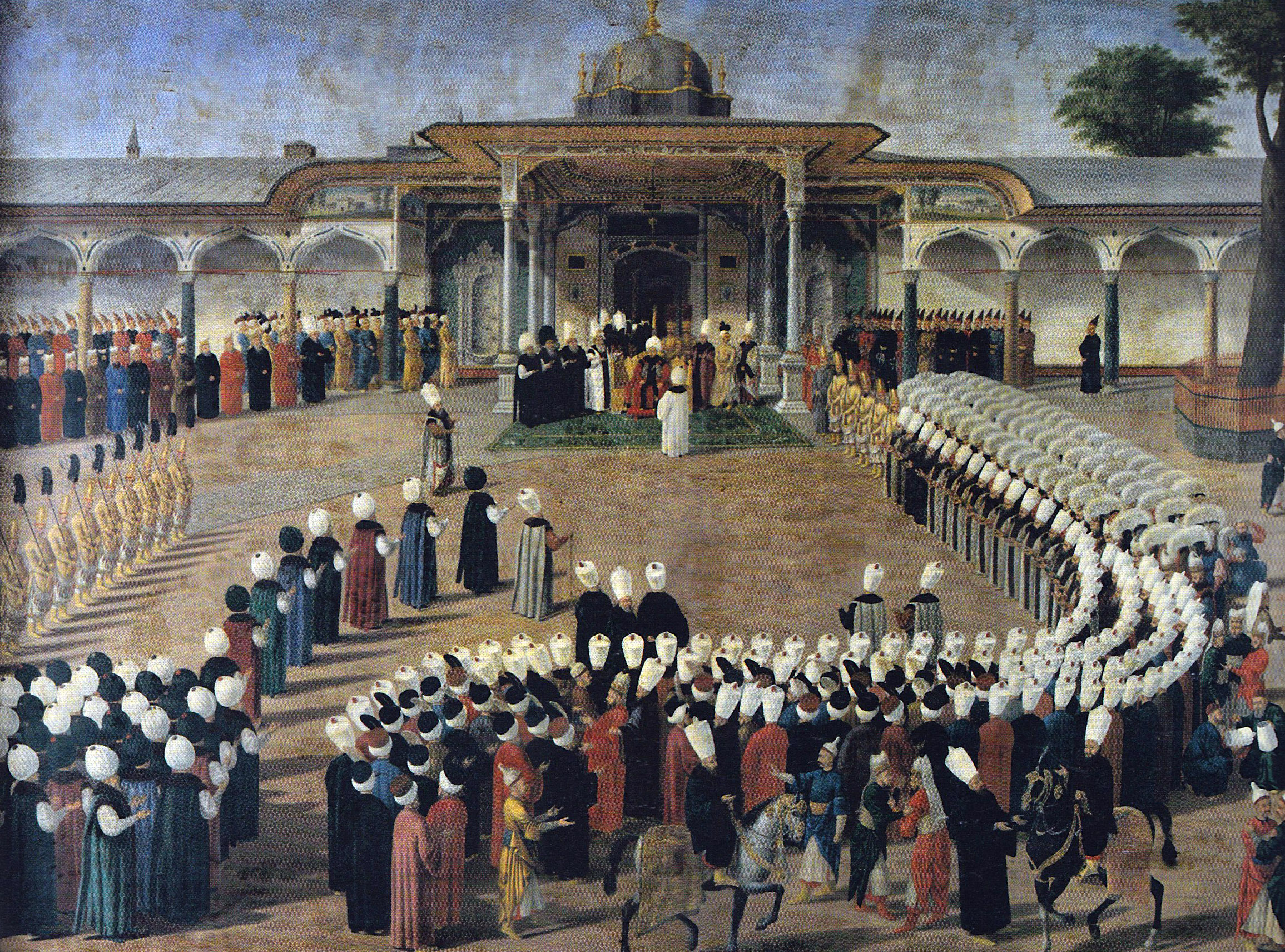
Painting of Sultan Selim III holding audience in front of the Gate of Felicity

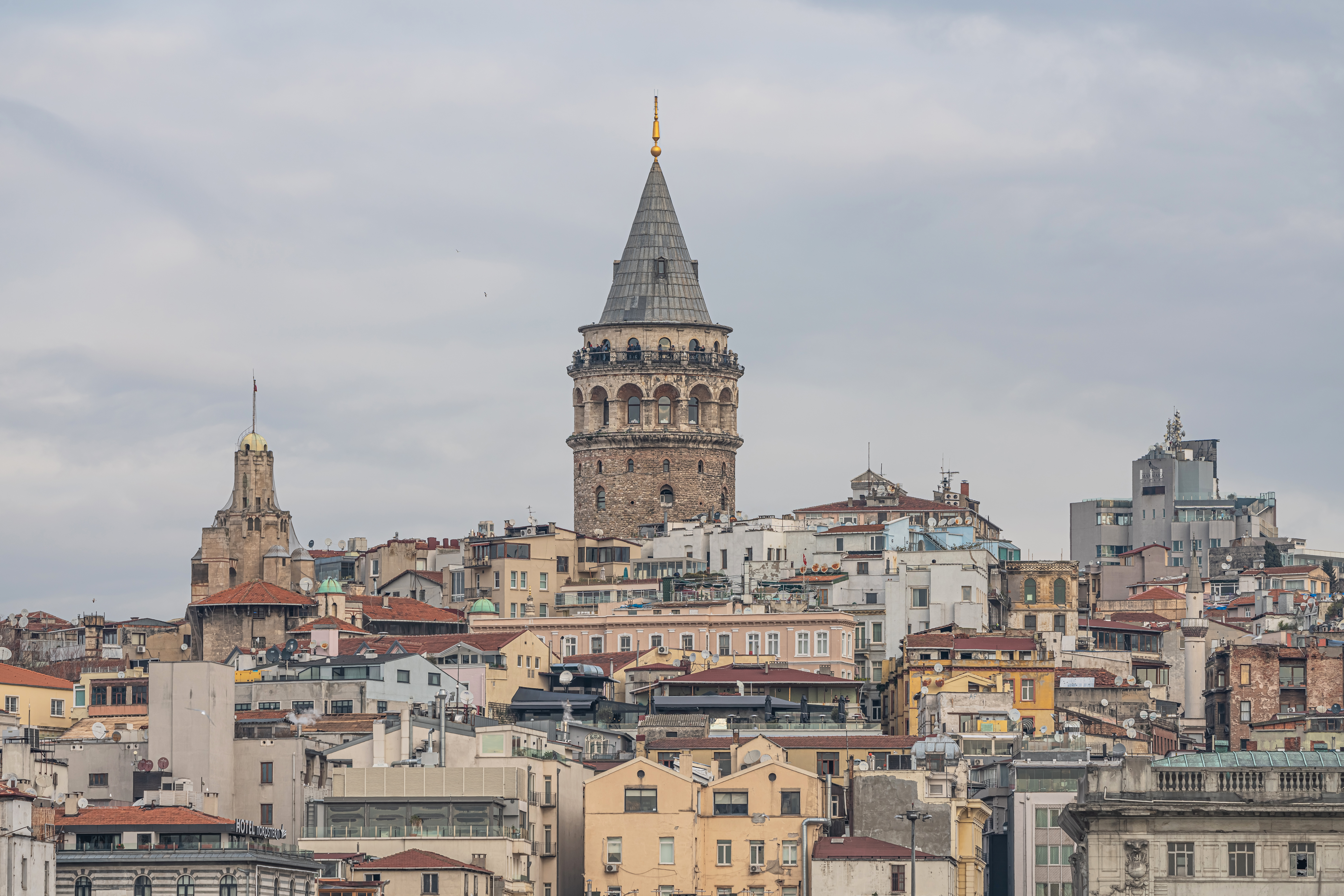
View of Galata Tower from Harem of Topkapı Palace

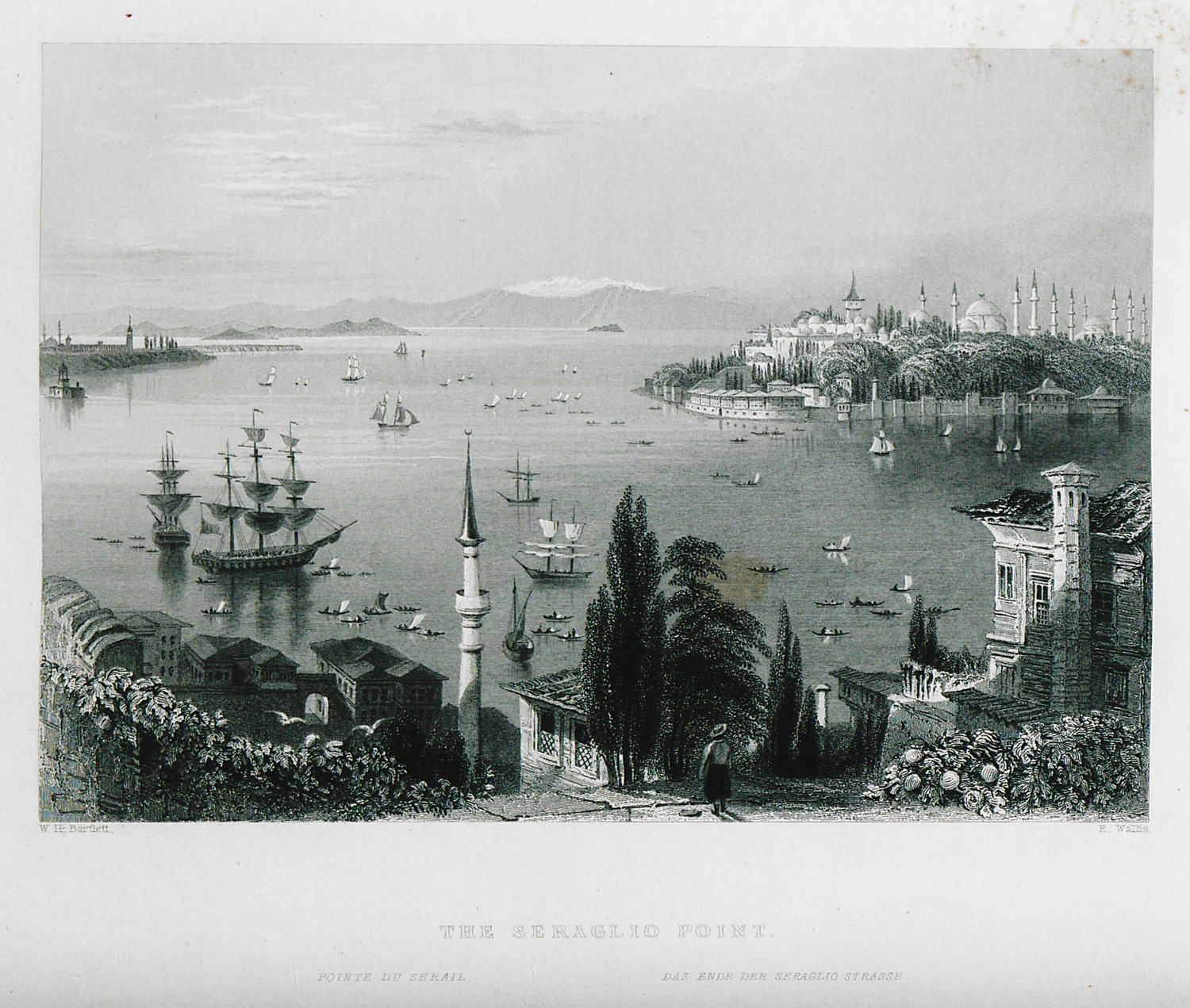
The Seraglio Point, 1838

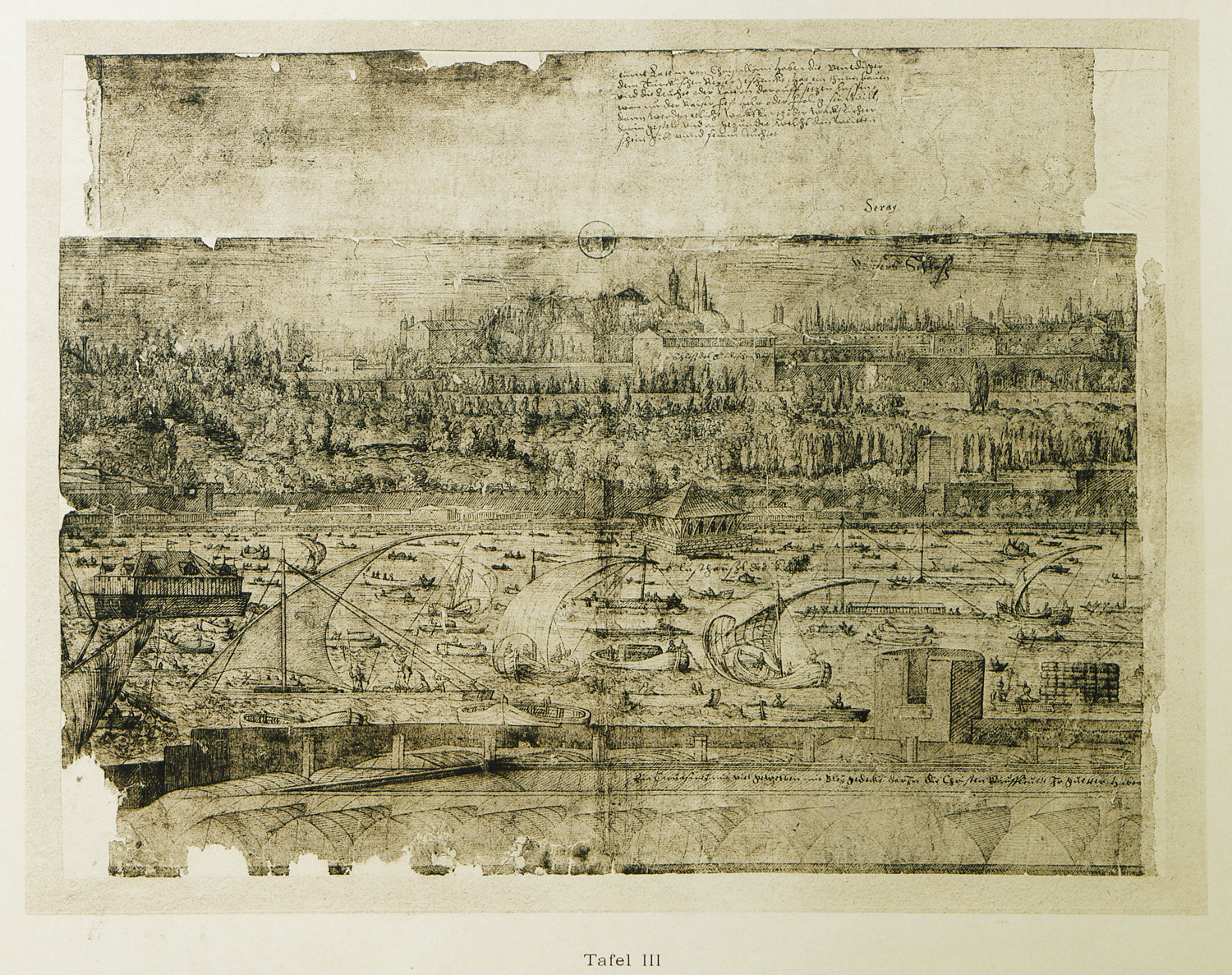
Partial view of Seraglio Point with Topkapı Palace and Incirli Kiosk, 1559

== Imperial Gate ==
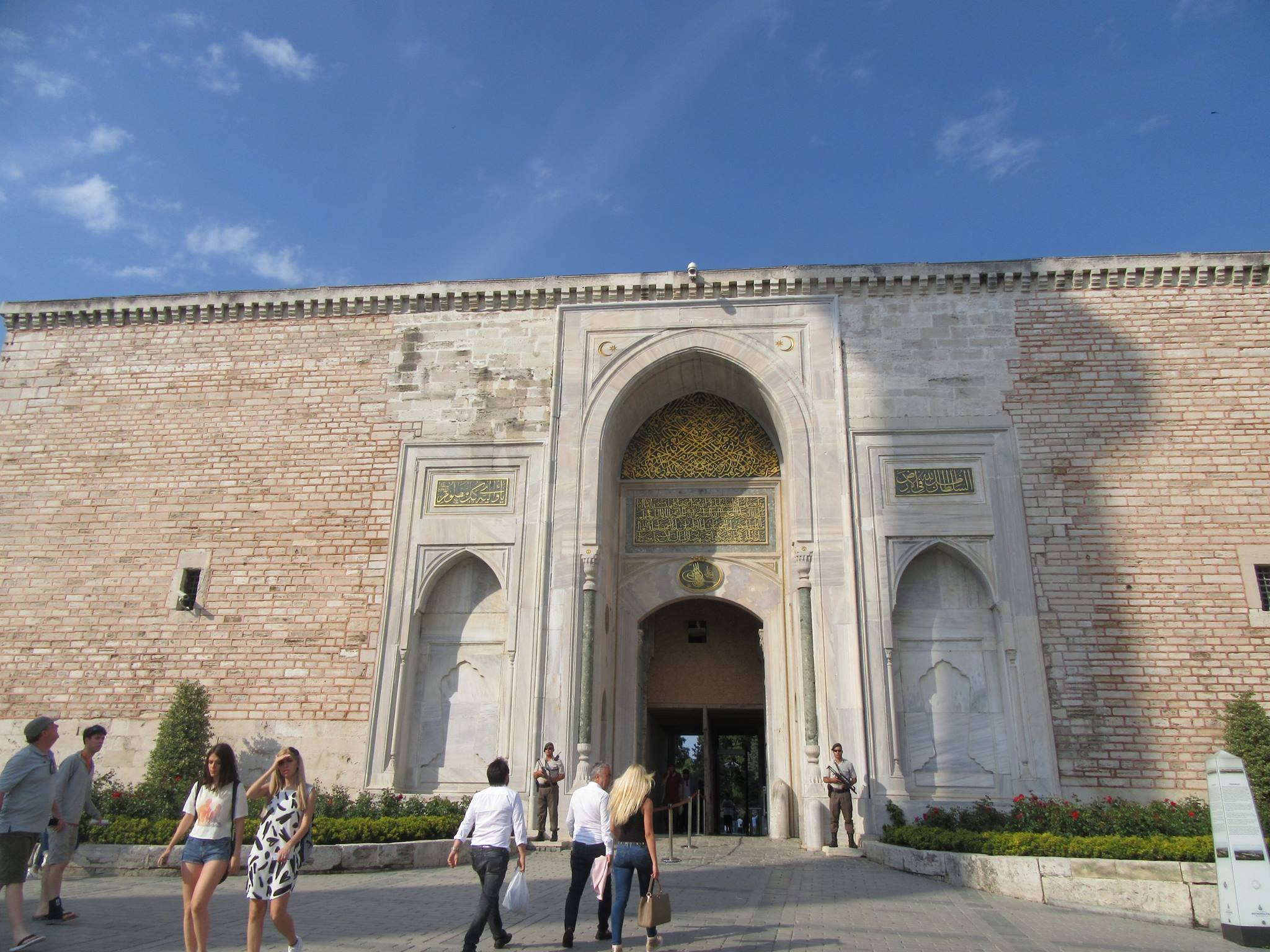
The Imperial Gate (Bâb-ı Hümâyûn)

The main street leading to the palace is the Byzantine processional Mese avenue, known today as Divan Yolu ('Council Street'). This street was used for imperial processions during the Byzantine and Ottoman era. It leads directly to the Hagia Sophia and turns northwest towards the palace square to the Fountain of Ahmed III.

The Imperial Gate is the main entrance into the First Courtyard. The sultan would enter the palace through the Imperial Gate (Turkish: Bâb-ı Hümâyûn, meaning 'royal gate' in Persian, or Saltanat Kapısı) located to the south of the palace. This massive gate, originally dating from 1478, is now covered in 19th-century marble. Its central arch leads to a high-domed passage; gilded Ottoman calligraphy adorns the structure at the top, with verses from the Qur'an and tughras of the sultans. The tughras of Mehmed II and Abdulaziz, who renovated the gate, have been identified.

According to old documents, there was a wooden apartment above the gate area until the second half of the 19th century. It was used as a pavilion by Mehmed, a depository for the properties of those who died inside the palace without heirs and the receiving department of the treasury. It has also been used as a vantage point for the ladies of the harem on special occasions.

== First Courtyard ==
Surrounded by high walls, the First Courtyard (I. Avlu or Alay Meydanı) functioned as an outer precinct or park and is the largest of all the courtyards of the palace. The steep slopes leading towards the sea had already been terraced under Byzantine rule. Some of the historical structures of the First Courtyard no longer exist. The structures that remain are the former Imperial Mint (Darphane-i Âmire, constructed in 1727), the church of Hagia Irene and various fountains. The Byzantine church of Hagia Irene was used by the Ottomans as a storehouse and imperial armoury. This courtyard was also known as the Court of the Janissaries or the Parade Court. Court officials and janissaries would line the path dressed in their best garb. Visitors entering the palace would follow the path towards the Gate of Salutation and the Second Courtyard of the palace.

The large Gate of Salutation, also known as the Middle Gate (Turkish: Orta Kapı), leads into the palace and the Second Courtyard. This crenellated gate has two large, pointed octagonal towers. Its date of construction is uncertain; the architecture of the towers appears to be of Byzantine influence. An inscription at the door dates this gate to at least 1542. The gate is richly decorated with religious inscriptions and monograms of sultans. Passage through the gate was tightly controlled and all visitors had to dismount, since only the sultan was allowed to enter the gate on horseback. This was also a Byzantine tradition taken from the Chalke Gate of the Great Palace. The Fountain of the Executioner (Cellat Çeşmesi) is where the executioner purportedly washed his hands and sword after a decapitation, though there is disagreement about whether the fountain was actually used for this purpose. It is located on the right side when facing the Gate of Salutation from the First Courtyard.

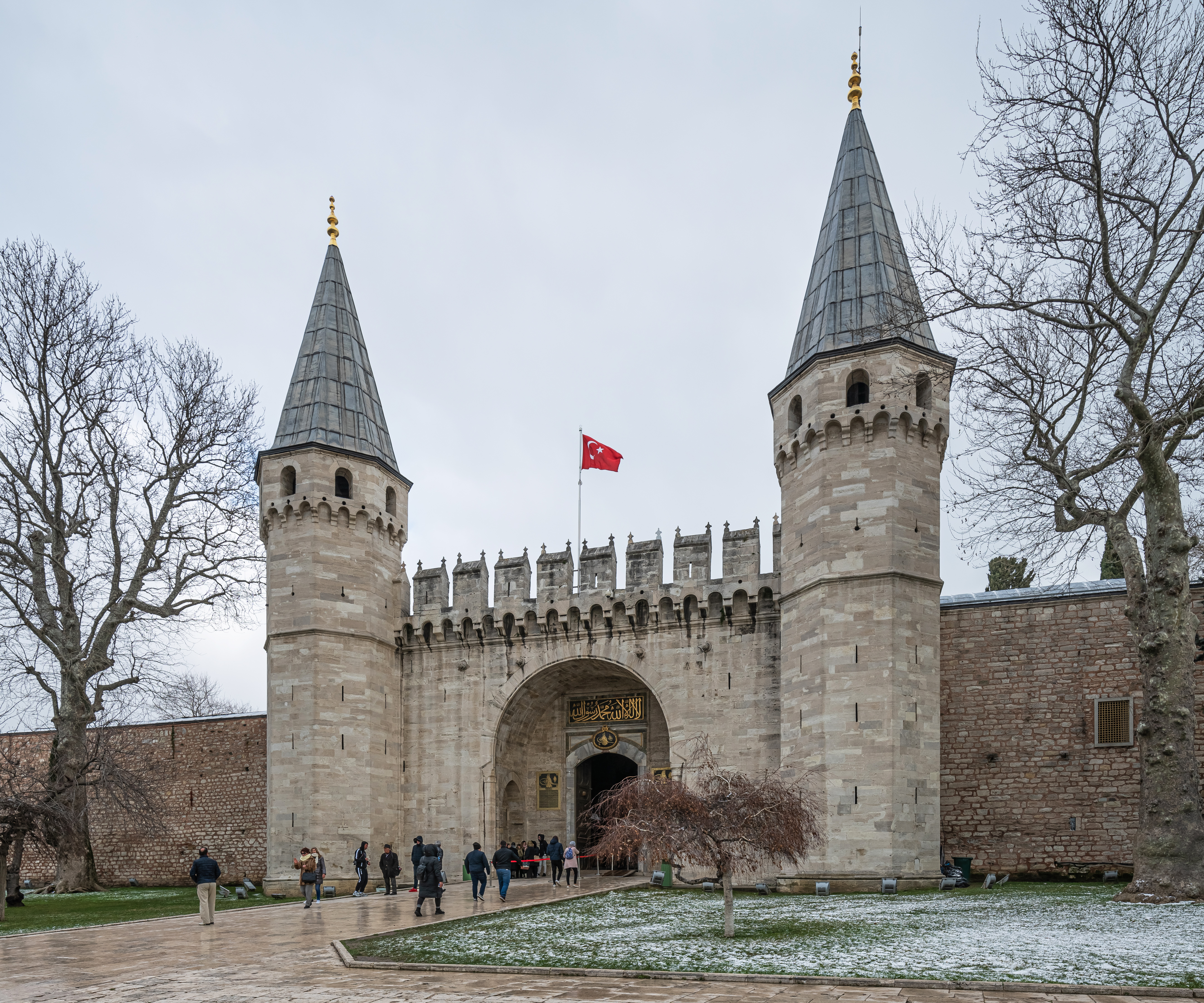
The Gate of Salutation, entrance to the Second courtyard of Topkapı Palace

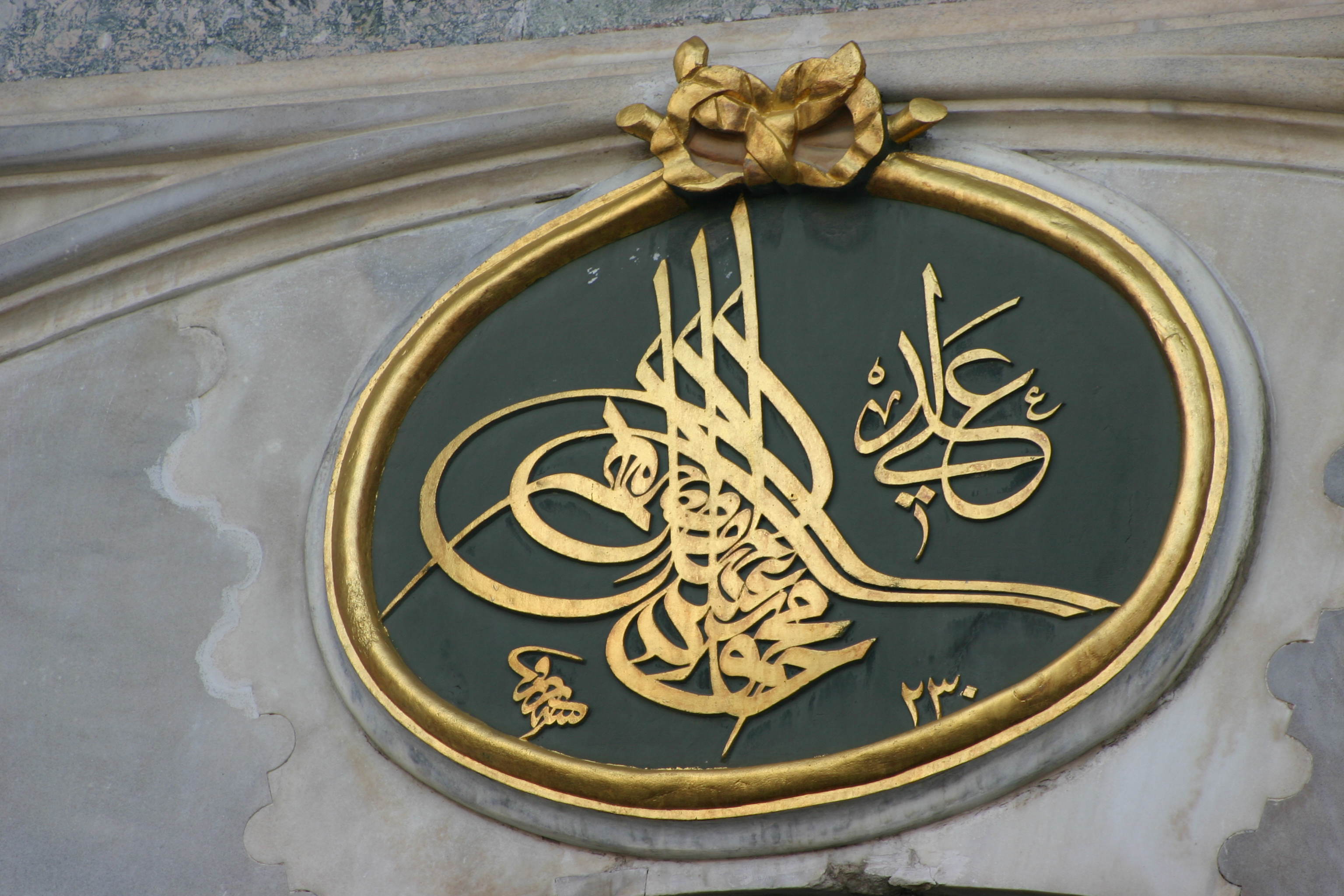
Tughra of Mahmud II on the Gate of Salutation

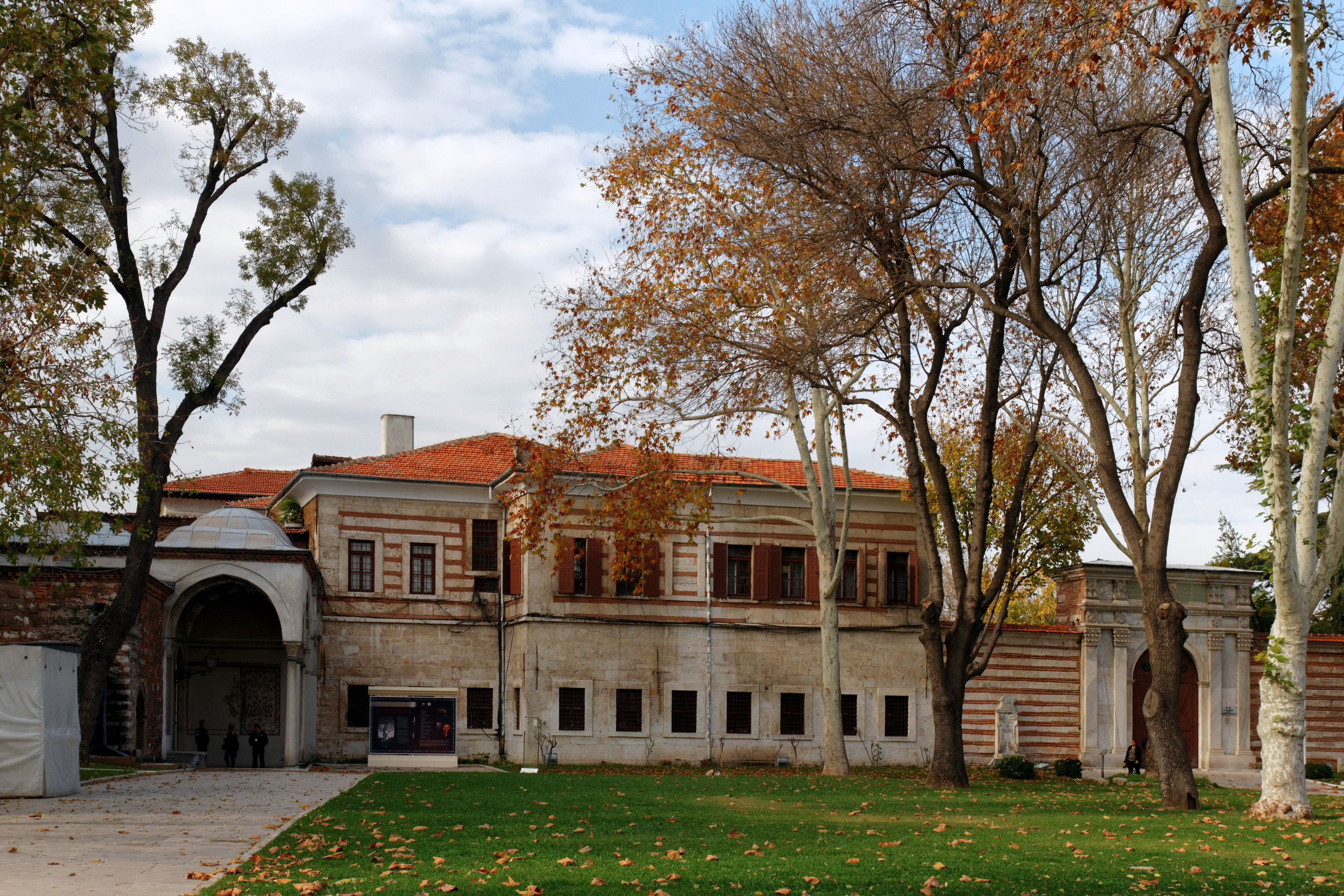
The Imperial Mint of the Ottoman Empire

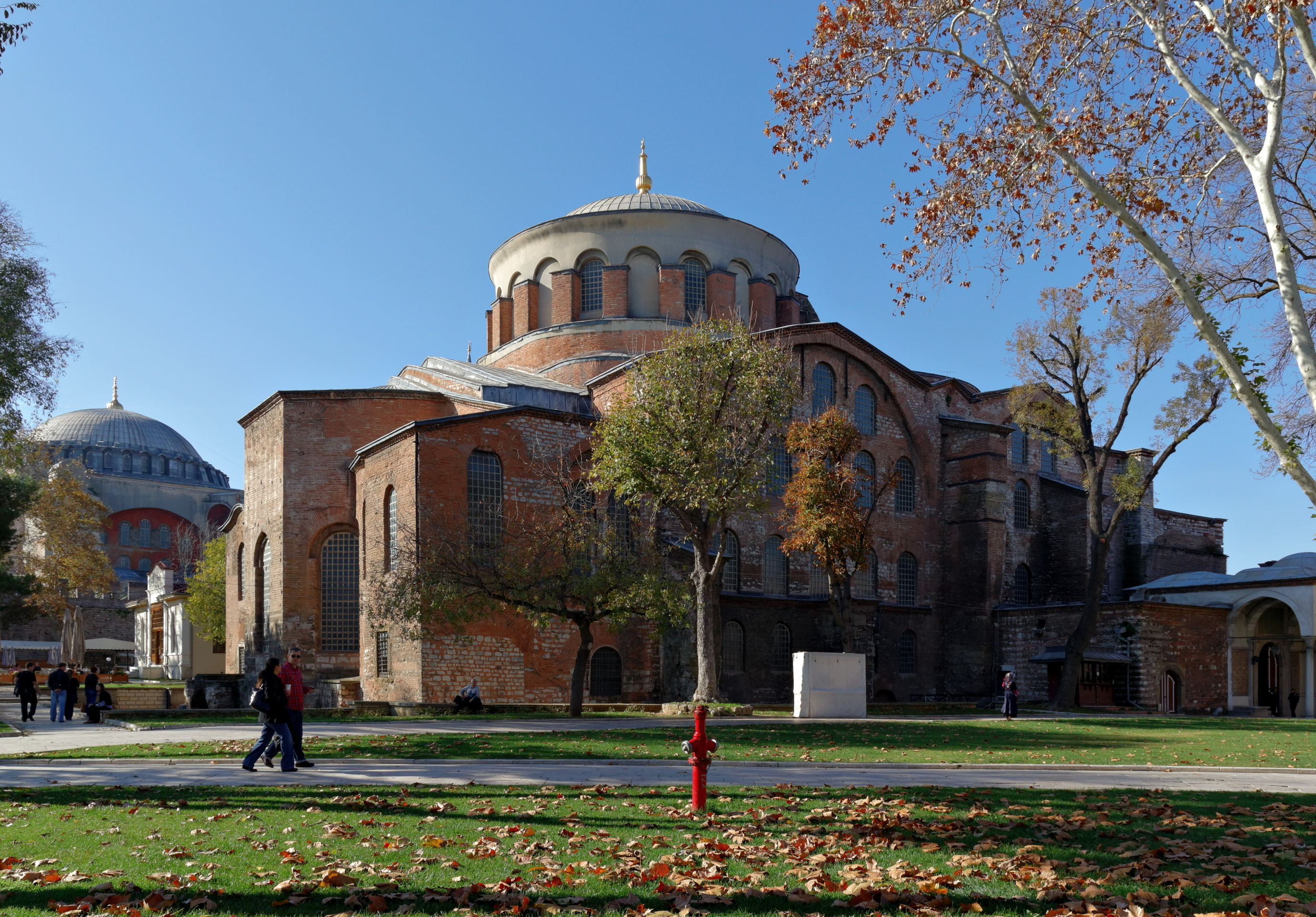
Byzantine Church Hagia Irene

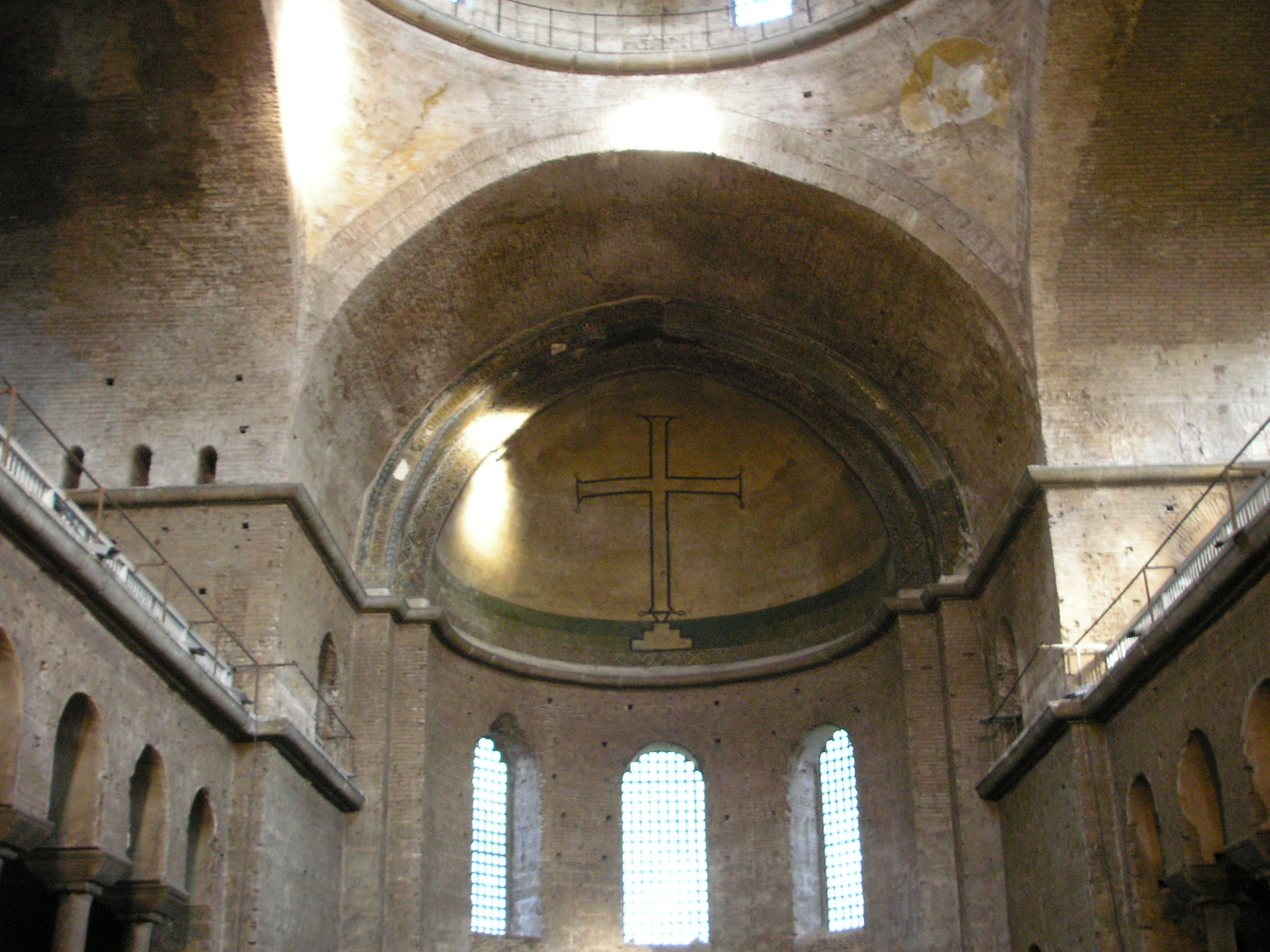
Hagia Irene interior

In April 2021, archaeologists uncovered a Roman period gallery consisting of three sections during the underground researches carried out in Topkapı Palace. The gallery located near the Imperial Gate was revealed during the excavation of the First Courtyard.

== Second Courtyard ==
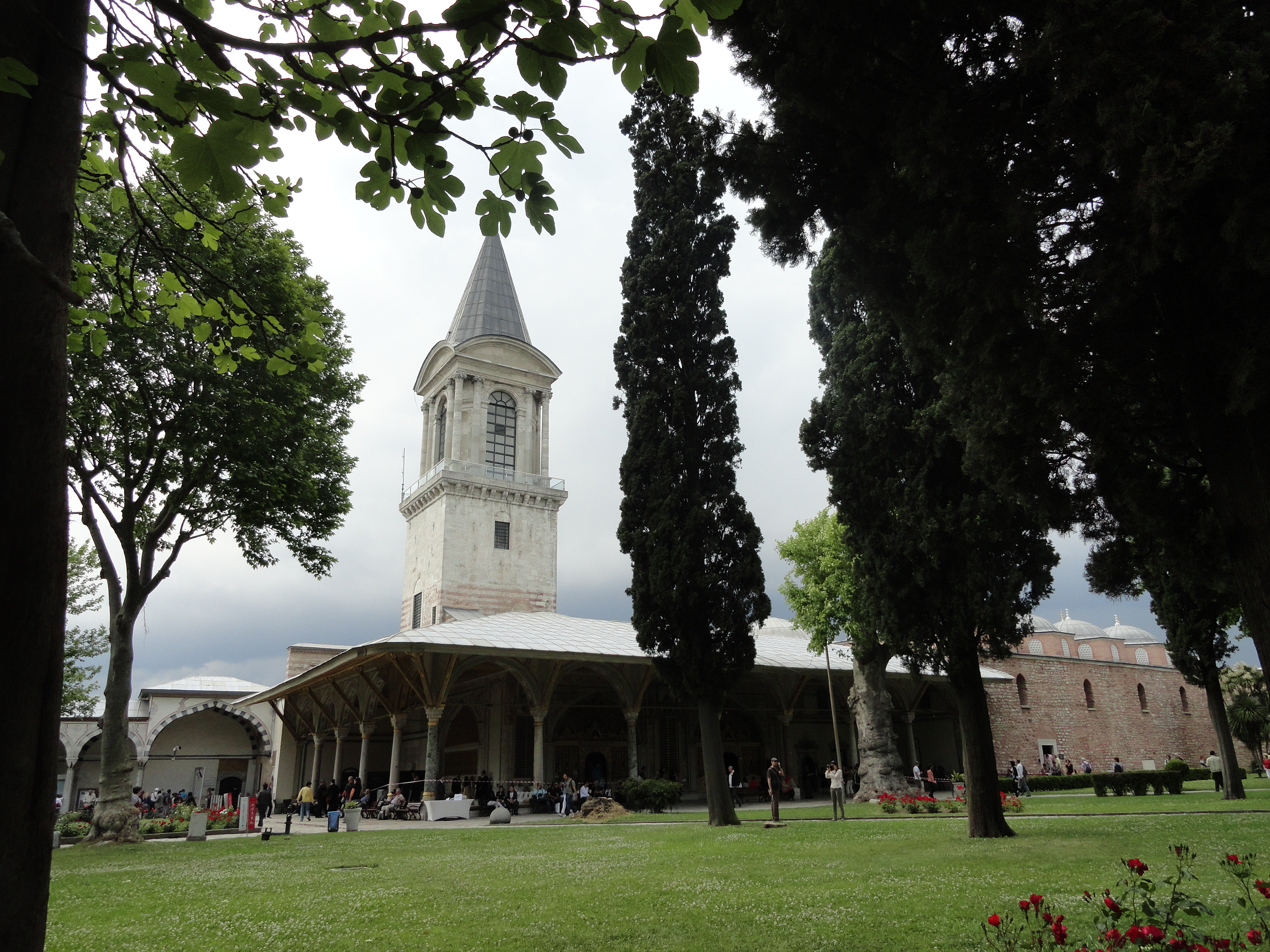
Layout of the second courtyard: the gilded door leads to the domed Imperial Council Chamber and in the background is the Tower of Justice

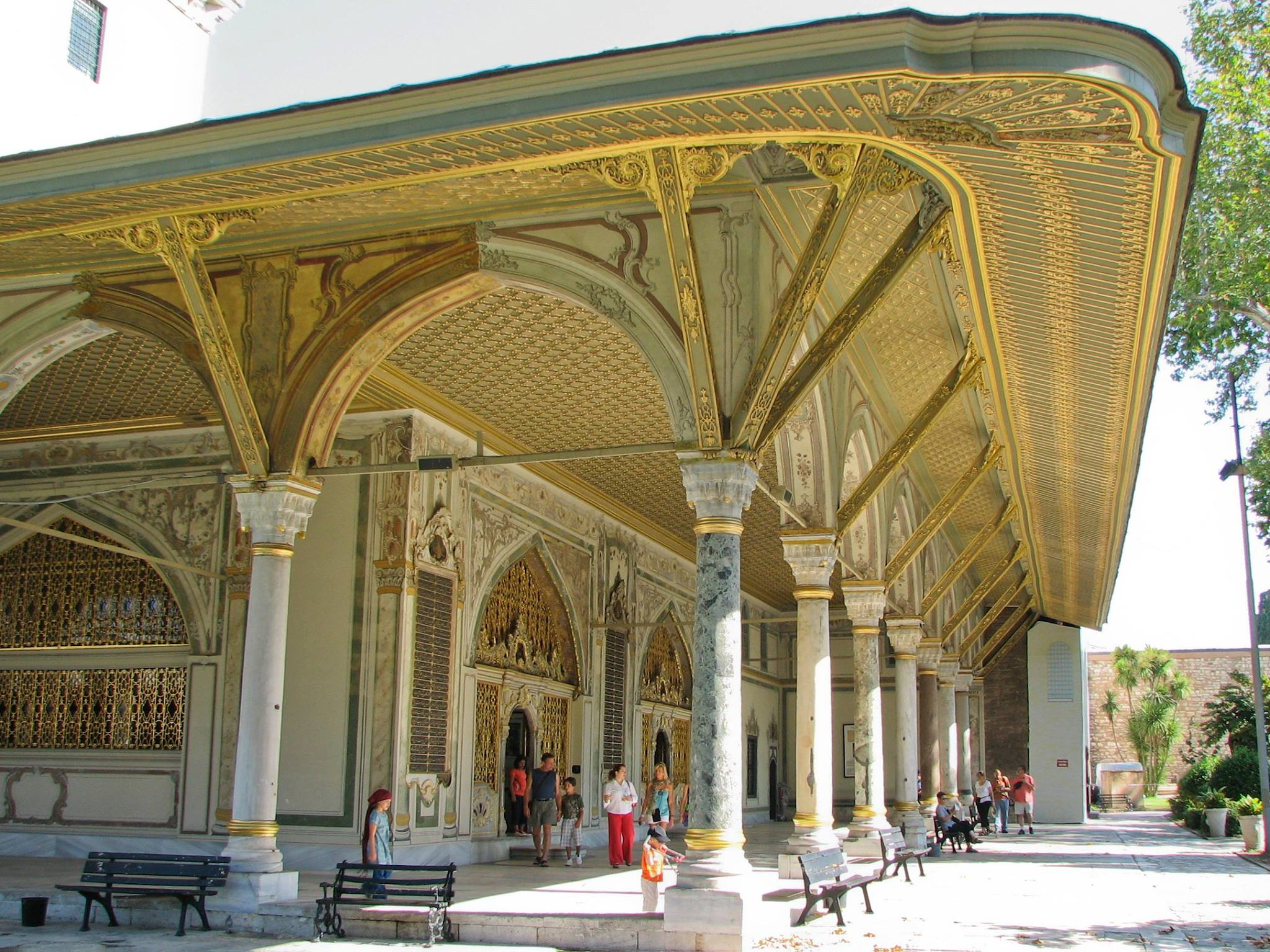
Roof of the Imperial Council

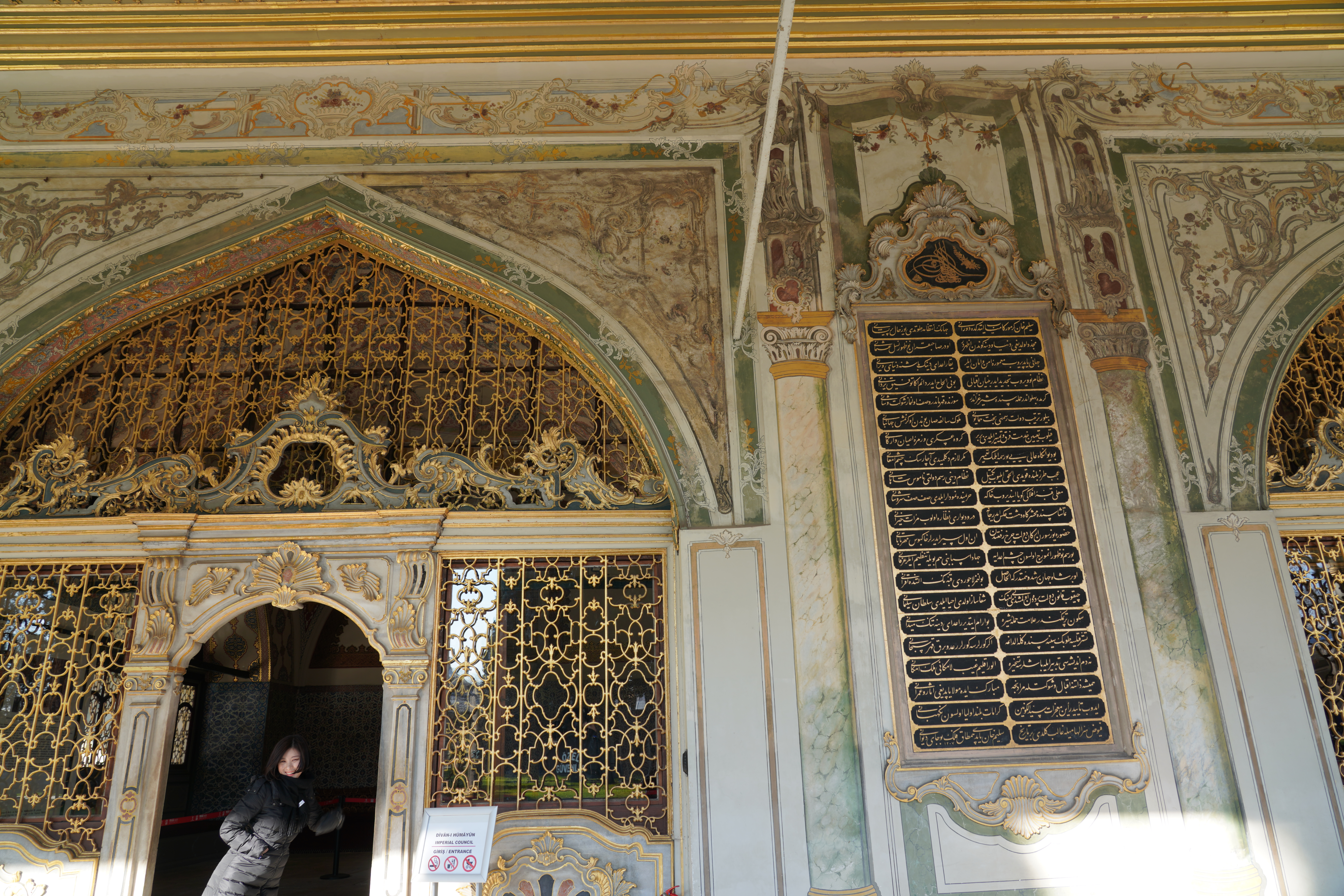
Entrance of the Imperial Council

Through the middle gate is the Second Courtyard (II. Avlu), or Divan Square (Divan Meydanı). The courtyard was probably completed around 1465, during the reign of Mehmed II. It received its final appearance around 1525–1529 during the reign of Suleyman I. It is surrounded by the former palace hospital, bakery, Janissary quarters, stables, the imperial harem and Divan to the north and the kitchens to the south. At the end of the courtyard, the Gate of Felicity marks the entrance to the Third Courtyard. Numerous artifacts from the Roman and Byzantine periods that have been found on the palace site during recent excavations, including sarcophagi, are on display in the Second Courtyard in front of the imperial kitchens. Located underneath the Second Courtyard is a cistern that dates to Byzantine times. During Ottoman times this courtyard would have been full of peacocks and gazelles. It was used as a gathering place for courtiers. The Sultan, seated on the gold-plated Bayram throne, used to hold audiences in the second courtyard. Some foreign dignitaries, including the French ambassador Philippe du Fresne-Canaye, have written accounts about these audiences.

The imperial stables (Istabl-ı Âmire), located around five to six meters below ground level, were constructed under Mehmed II and renovated under Suleyman. A vast collection of harness "treasures" (Raht Hazinesi) are kept in the privy stables. This area also has a small 18th-century mosque and the bath of Beşir Ağa (Beşir Ağa Camii ve Hamamı), who was the chief black eunuch of Mahmud I.

At the end of the imperial stables are the Dormitories of the Halberdiers with Tresses (Zülüflü Baltacılar Koğuşu). The responsibilities of the halberdiers included carrying wood to the palace rooms and service for some of the palace quarters. The halberdiers wore long tresses to signify their higher position. The first mention of this corps is around 1527, when they were established to clear the roads ahead of the army during a campaign. The dormitory was founded in the 15th century. It was enlarged by the chief architect Davud Ağa in 1587, during the reign of Sultan Murad III. The dormitories are constructed around a main courtyard in the traditional layout of an Ottoman house, with baths and a mosque, as well as recreational rooms such as a pipe-room. On the outside and inside of the complex, many pious foundation inscriptions about the various duties and upkeep of the quarters can be found. In contrast to the rest of the palace, the quarters are constructed of red and green painted wood.

=== Palace kitchens and porcelain collection ===
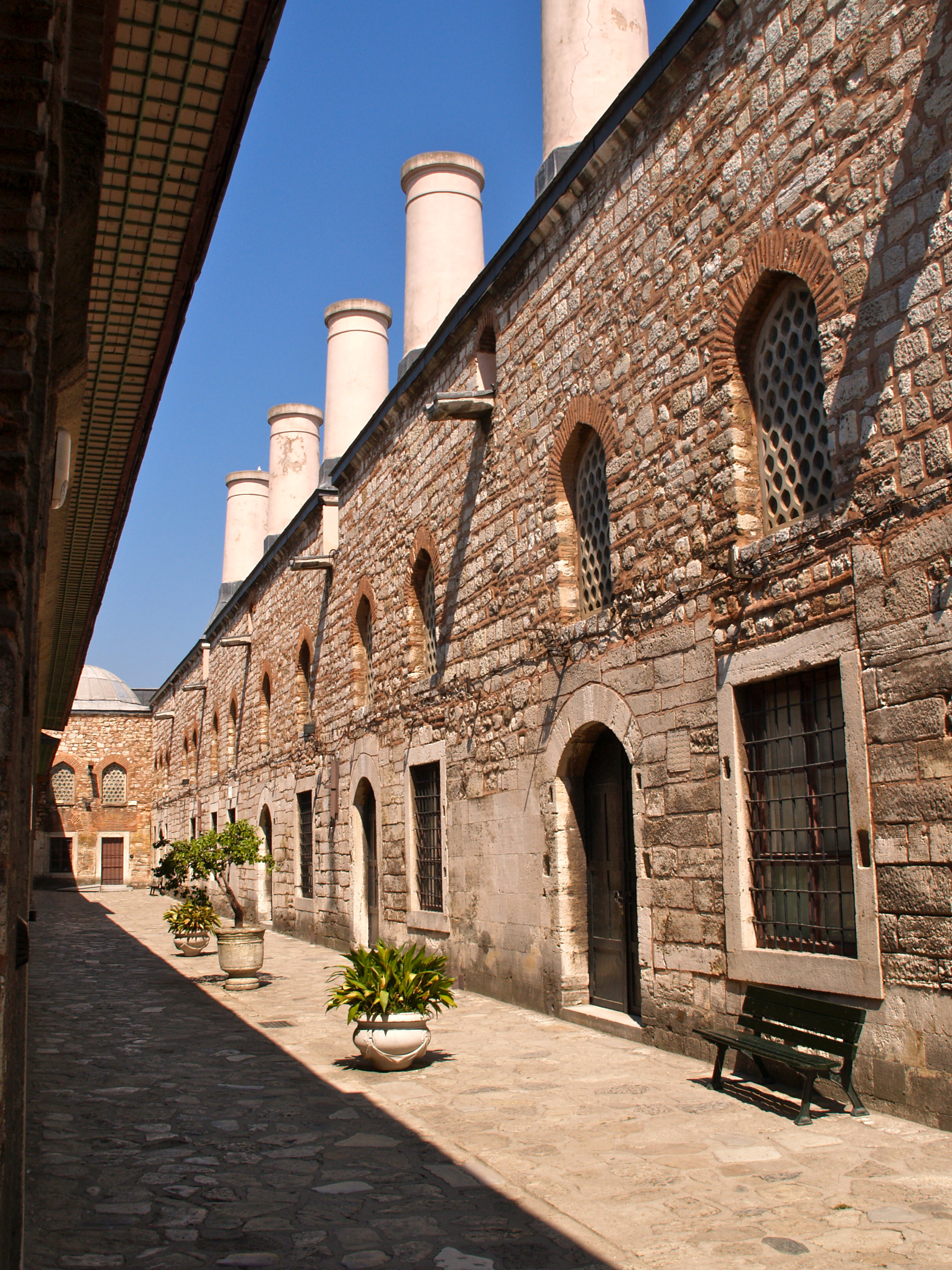
The palace kitchens with the tall chimneys

The palace kitchens (Saray Mutfakları) were built when the palace was first constructed in the 15th century and expanded during the reign of Suleyman the Magnificent. They were modeled on the kitchens of Edirne Palace. After the fire of 1574, which damaged the kitchens, they were remodeled by the court architect Mimar Sinan. The rebuilt kitchens form two rows of 20 wide chimneys; these chimneys were added by Mimar Sinan.

The kitchens are located on an internal street stretching between the Second Courtyard and the Marmara Sea. The entrance to this section is through the three doors in the portico of the Second Courtyard: the Imperial commissariat (lower kitchen) door, imperial kitchen door and the confectionery kitchen door. The palace kitchens consist of 10 domed buildings: Imperial kitchen, (palace school), Harem (women's quarters), Birûn (outer service section of the palace), kitchens, beverages kitchen, confectionery kitchen, creamery, storerooms and rooms for the cooks. They were the largest kitchens in the Ottoman Empire. Food was prepared for about 4,000 people and the kitchen staff consisted of more than 800 people. The kitchens included dormitories, baths and a mosque for the employees, most of which disappeared over time.

Apart from exhibiting kitchen utensils, today the buildings contain a silver gifts collection, as well as a large collection of porcelain. The Ottomans had access to Chinese porcelains from the mid-fifteenth century onward. Although official Chinese sources have documented that some Ottoman envoys paid tributary visits to China and received gifts, including porcelain wares, from the Chinese emperor as rewards, no sources on the Ottoman side substantiate such official missions. The collection of 10,700 pieces of

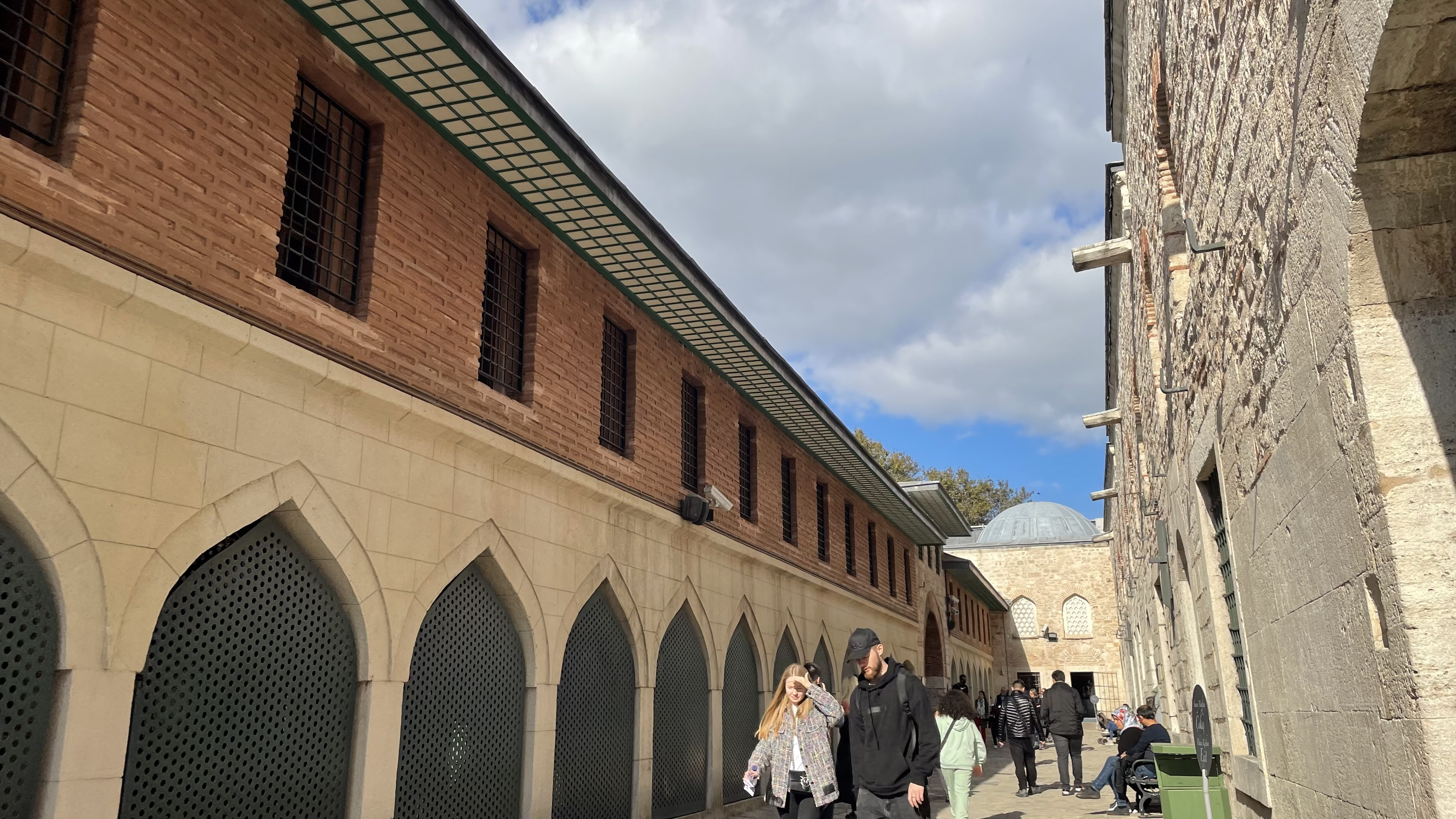
The palace kitchen section

Chinese porcelain is among the finest porcelain collections in the world. Porcelains often entered the palace collection as parts of the estates of deceased persons, and were sometimes circulated as gifts amongst members of the royal family or other leading officials. Records indicate that by the 18th century the palace collection had 16,566 pieces of Chinese porcelain, compared to 400 pieces in the 16th century and 3,645 pieces in the 17th century. The Chinese porcelain collection ranges from the late Song dynasty (960–1279) and the Yuan dynasty (1280–1368), through the Ming dynasty (1368–1644) to the Qing dynasty (1644–1911). The pieces include celadons as well as blue and white porcelain. The Japanese collection is mainly Imari porcelain, dating from the 17th to the 19th centuries. The collection also includes around 5,000 European pieces. Researchers believe that Ottoman tastes changed over time to favor various types of European porcelain by the 18th century.

=== Imperial Council ===
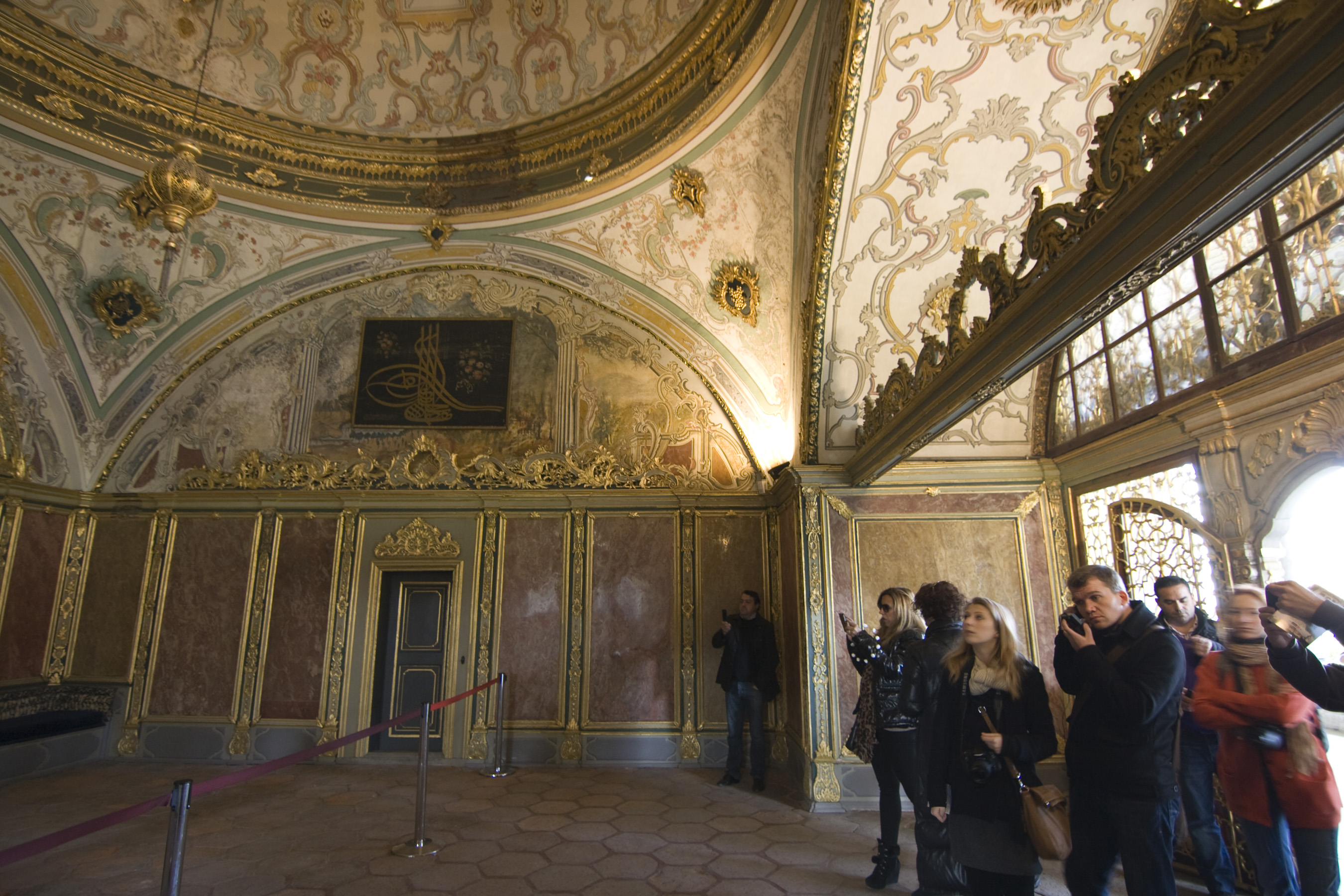
Interior of the Imperial Council

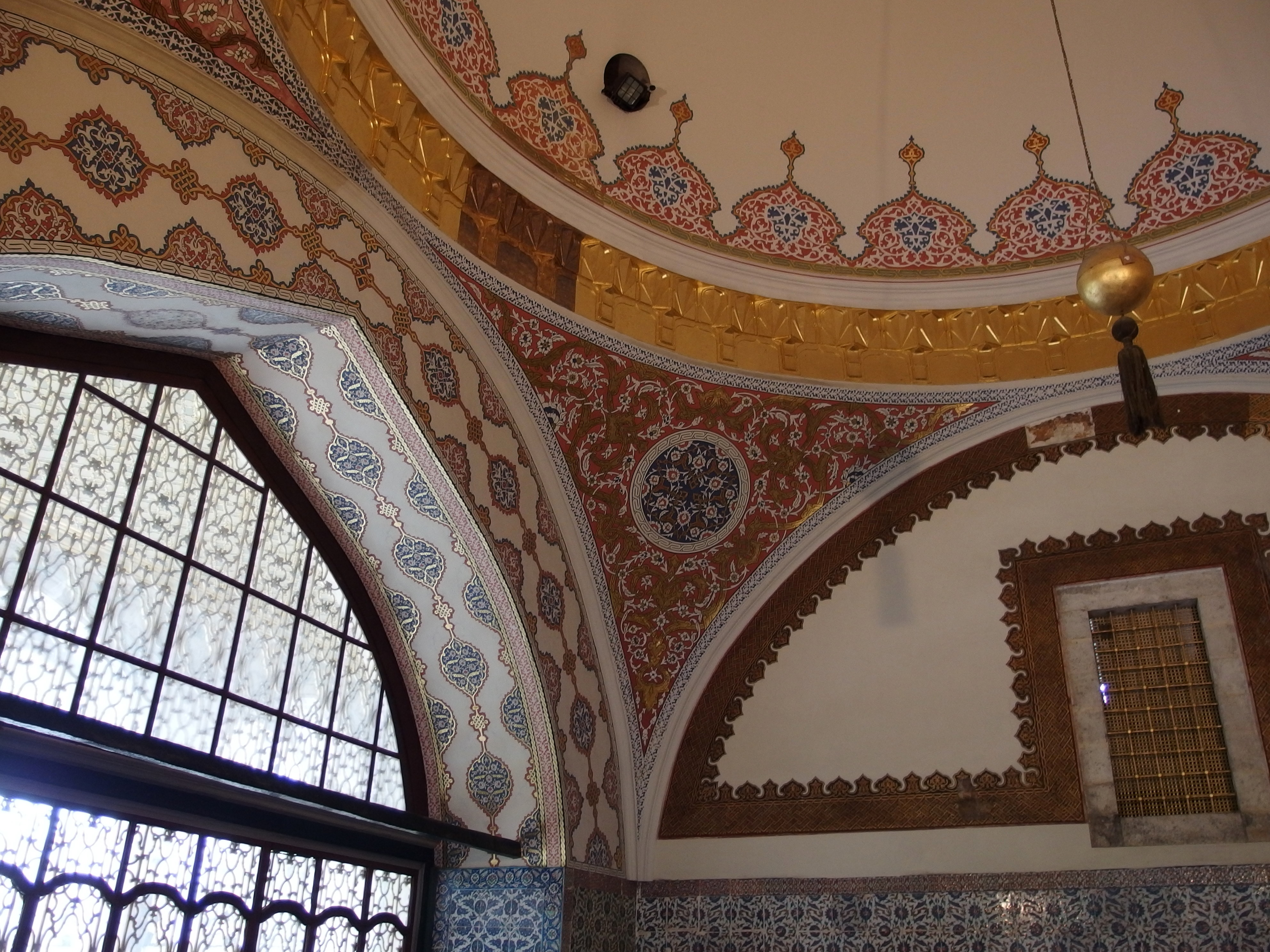
Interior of the Imperial Council

The Imperial Council (Dîvân-ı Hümâyûn) building is the chamber where the Imperial Council—consisting of the Grand Vizier (Vazīr-e Azam) and other council ministers (Dîvân Heyeti)—held meetings. The domed chamber of the building is called Kubbealtı, which means "under the dome". The council building situated in the northwestern corner of the courtyard next to the Gate of Felicity.

The Imperial Council building was first built during the reign of Mehmed II. The present building dates from the period of Süleyman the Magnificent; the chief architect was Alseddin. It had to be restored after the Harem fire of 1665. According to the entrance inscription it was also restored during the periods of Selim III and Mahmud II; on its façade are verse inscriptions that mention the restoration work carried out in 1792 and 1819 by Sultan Selim III and Mahmud II. The rococo decorations on the façade and inside the Imperial Council date from this period.

Diagram of a tile from the Imperial Council Chamber

There are multiple entrances to the council hall, both from inside the palace and from the courtyard. The porch consists of multiple marble and porphyry pillars, with an ornate green and white-coloured wooden ceiling decorated with gold. The exterior entrances into the hall are in the rococo style, with gilded grills to admit natural light. While the pillars are an earlier Ottoman style, the wall paintings and decorations are from the later rococo period. Inside, the Imperial Council building consists of three adjoining main rooms. The 15th century Divanhane, built with a wooden portico at the corner of the Divan Court, was later used as the mosque of the council. There are three domed chambers: the first chamber where the Imperial Council held its deliberations is called the Kubbealtı, the second was occupied by the secretarial staff of the Imperial Council, and the third—called Defterhāne—is where the head clerks kept records of the council meetings. The main chamber Kubbealtı is, however, decorated with Ottoman Kütahya tiles.

The Sultan or the Valide sultan was able to follow deliberations of the council without being noticed from a window with a golden grill. The window could be reached from the imperial quarters in the adjacent Tower of Justice (Adalet Kulesi). The window is mentioned for the first time in 1527 by the scholar Celalzade Mustafa Çelebi: "His Majesty [...] had built a high throne and a lofty loggia above the outer Council Hall where viziers sat, inventing a veiled window overlooking the Council Hall below. From this window, his Noble Excellency sometimes watched the events of the divan, checking the truth of affairs." The Tower of Justice (Adalet Kulesi) is located between the Imperial Council and the Harem.

The Tower of Justice is several stories high and the tallest structure in the palace, making it clearly visible from the Bosphorus as a landmark. The tower was probably originally constructed under Mehmed II and then renovated and enlarged by Suleiman I between 1527 and 1529. Sultan Mahmud II rebuilt the lantern of the tower in 1825 while retaining the Ottoman base. The tall windows with engaged columns and the Renaissance pediments evoke the Palladian style.

=== Imperial Treasury ===
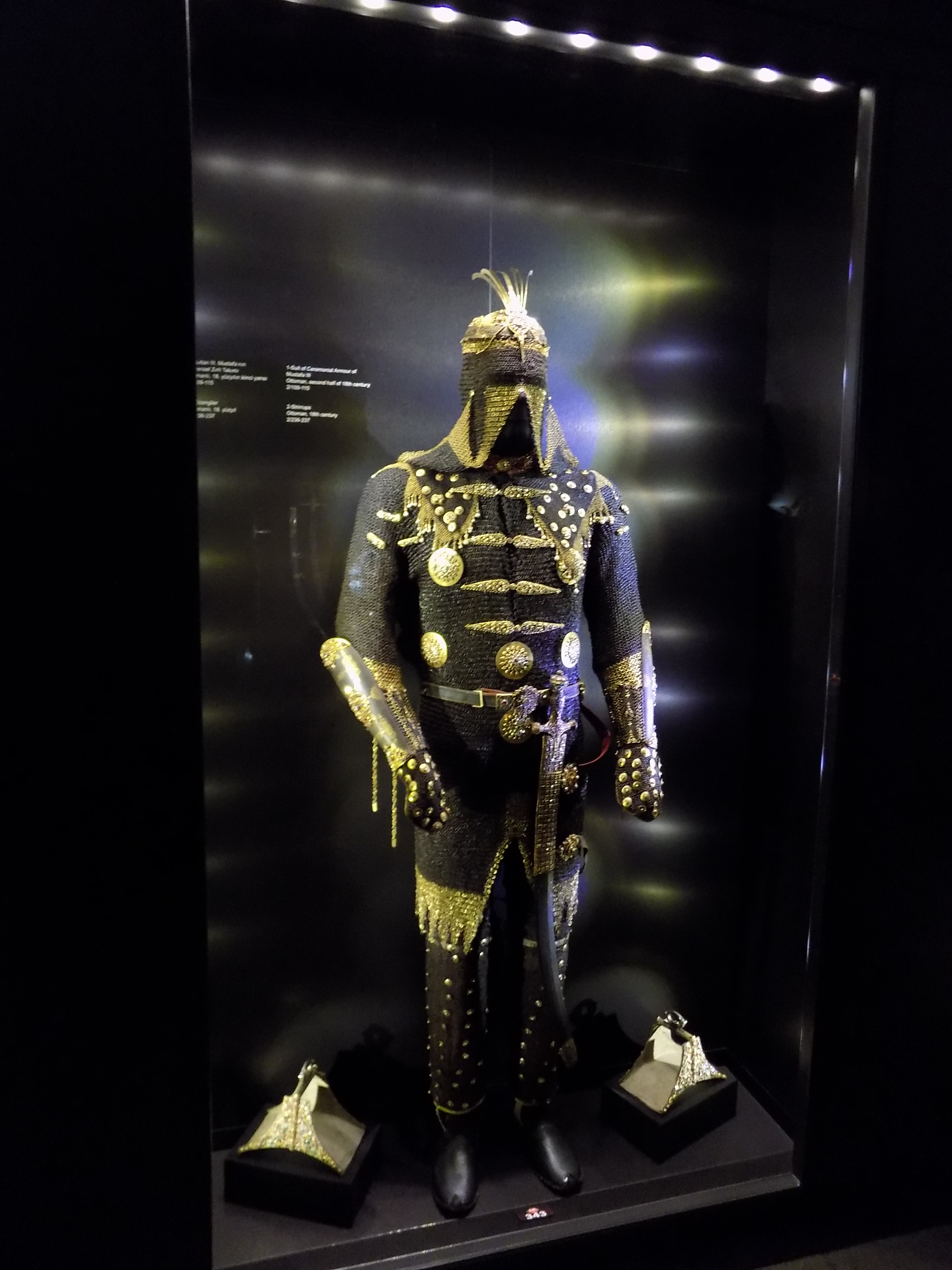
The former Imperial Treasury houses the armoury collection today.

The building where the arms and armor are exhibited was originally one of the palace treasuries (Dîvân-ı Hümâyûn Hazinesi / Hazine-ı Âmire). Since there was another ("inner") treasury in the Third Courtyard, this one was also called "outer treasury" (dış hazine). Although it contains no dated inscriptions, its construction technique and plan suggest that it was built at the end of the 15th century during the reign of Süleiman I. It subsequently underwent numerous alterations and renovations. It is a hall built of stone and brick with eight domes, each 5 x 11.40 m.

This treasury was used to finance the administration of the state. The kaftans given as presents to the viziers, ambassadors and residents of the palace by the financial department and the sultan and other valuable objects were also stored here. The janissaries were paid their quarterly wages (called ulufe) from this treasury, which was closed by the imperial seal entrusted to the grand vizier. In 1928, four years after the Topkapı Palace was converted into a museum, its collection of arms and armor was put on exhibition in this building.

During excavations in 1937 in front of this building, remains of a religious Byzantine building dating from the 5th century were found. Since it could not be identified with any of the churches known to have been built on the palace site, it is now known as "the Basilica of the Topkapı Palace" or simply Palace Basilica.

Also located outside the treasury building is a target stone (Nişan Taşı), which is over two metres tall. This stone was erected in commemoration of a record rifle shot by Selim III in 1790. It was brought to the palace from Levend in the 1930s.

==== Arms collection ====
The arms collection (Silah Seksiyonu Sergi Salonu), which consists primarily of weapons that remained in the palace at the time of its conversion, is one of the richest assemblages of Islamic arms in the world, with examples spanning 1,300 years from the 7th to the 20th centuries. The palace's collection of arms and armor consists of objects manufactured by the Ottomans themselves, or gathered from foreign conquests, or given as presents. Ottoman weapons form the bulk of the collection, but it also includes examples of Umayyad and Abbasid swords, as well as Mamluk and Persian armor, helmets, swords and axes. A lesser number of European and Asian arms make up the remainder of the collection. Currently on exhibition are some 400 weapons, most of which bear inscriptions.

=== Gate of Felicity ===
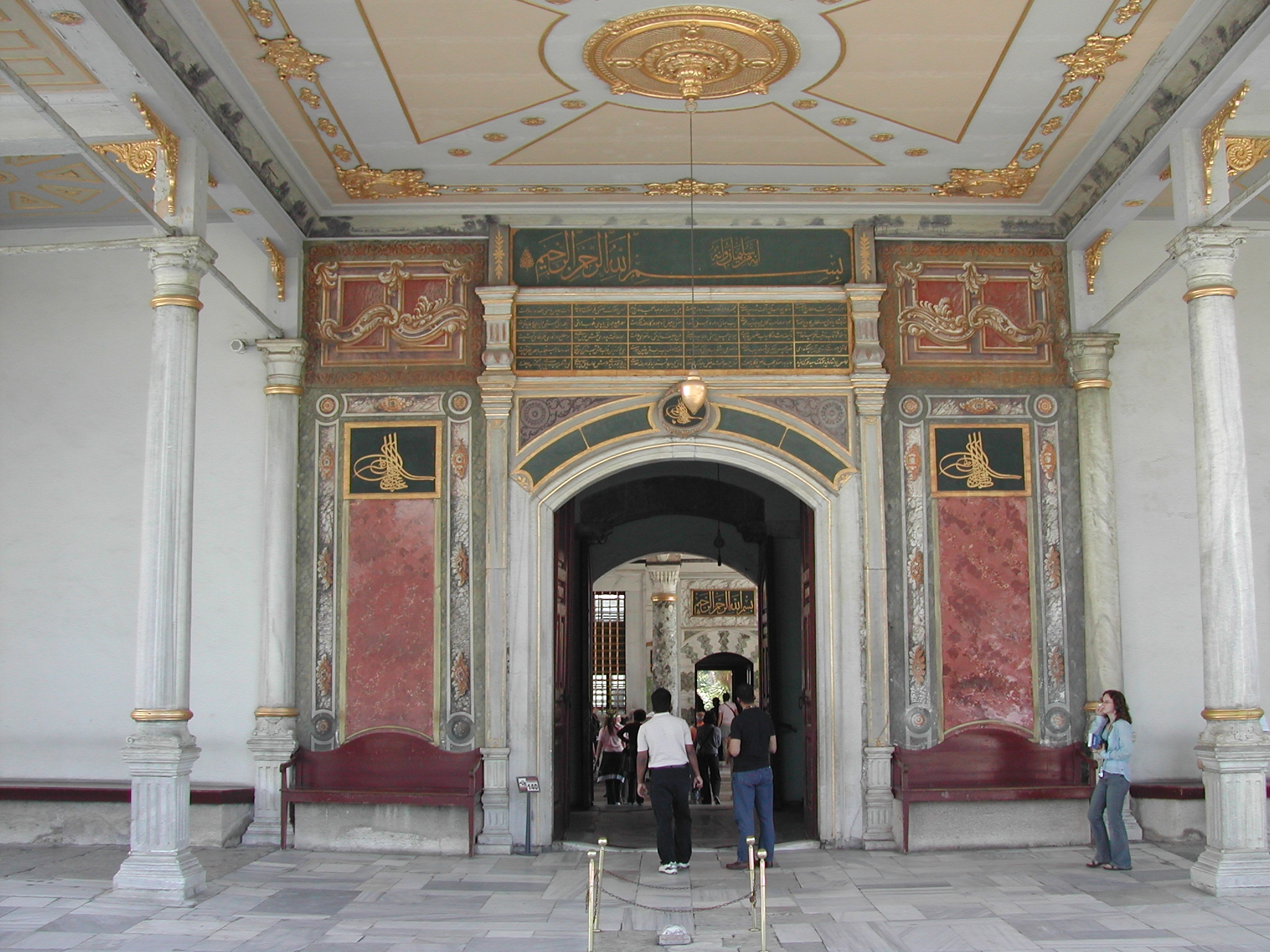
Detail of the Gate of Felicity

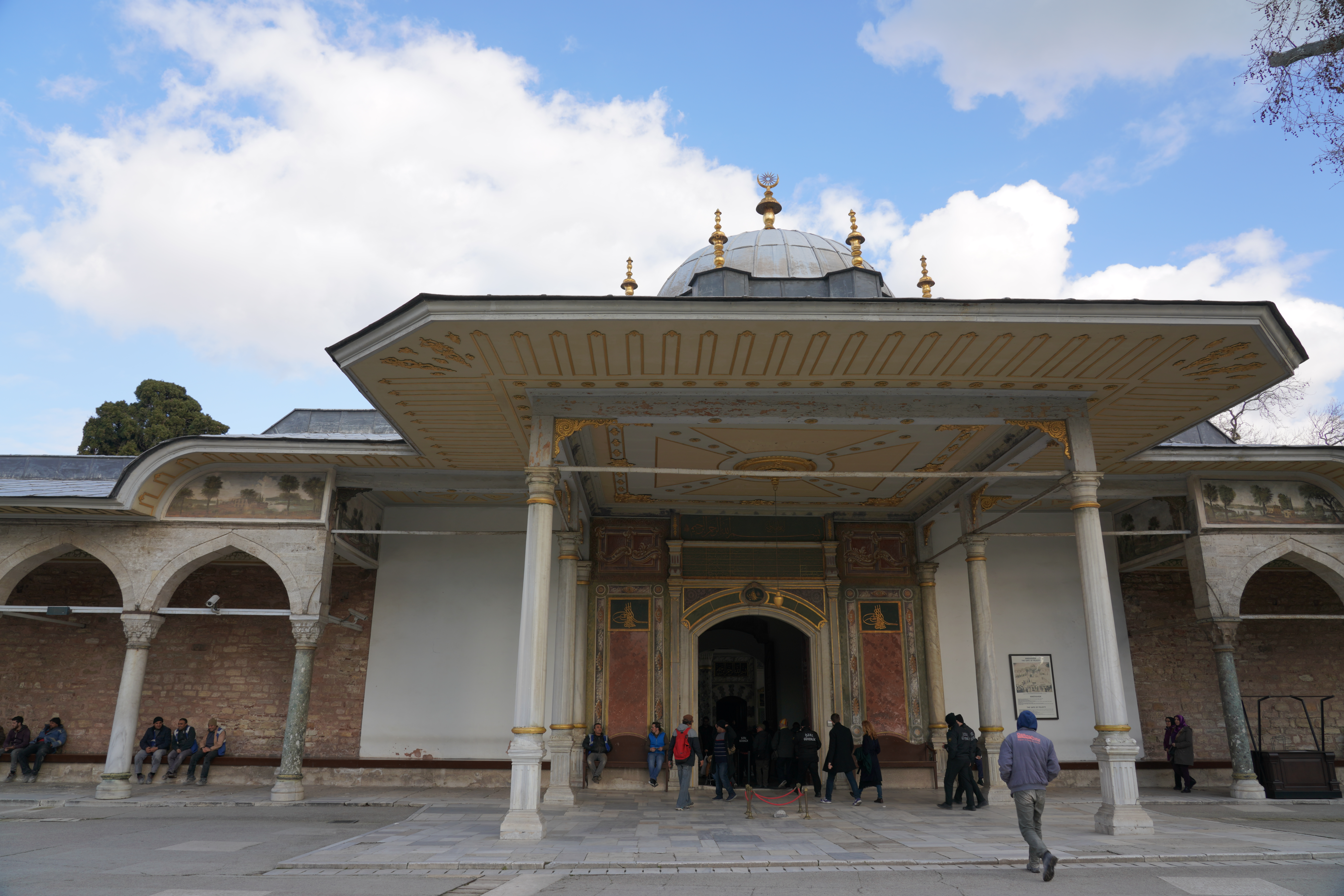
The Gate of Felicity (Bâbüssaâde)

The Gate of Felicity (Bâbüssaâde or Bab-üs Saadet) is the entrance into the Inner Court (Enderûn meaning "inside" in Persian), also known as the Third Courtyard, marking the border to the Outer Court or Birûn (meaning "outside" in Persian). The Third Courtyard comprises the private and residential areas of the palace. The gate has a dome supported by lean marble pillars. It represents the presence of the Sultan in the palace. No one could pass this gate without the authority of the Sultan. Even the Grand Vizier was only granted authorisation on specified days and under specified conditions.

The gate was probably constructed under Mehmed II in the 15th century. It was redecorated in the rococo style in 1774 under Sultan Mustafa III and during the reign of Mahmud II. The gate is further decorated with Qur'anic verses above the entrance and tuğras. The ceiling is partly painted and gold-leafed, with a golden ball hanging from the middle. The sides with baroque decorative elements and miniature paintings of landscapes.

The Sultan used this gate and the Divan Meydanı square only for special ceremonies. The Sultan sat before the gate on his Bayram throne on religious, festive days and accession, when the subjects and officials perform their homage standing. The funerals of the Sultan were also conducted in front of the gate.

On either side of this colonnaded passage, under control of the Chief Eunuch of the Sultan's Harem (called the Bâbüssaâde Ağası) and the staff under him, were the quarters of the eunuchs as well as the small and large rooms of the palace school.

The small, indented stone on the ground in front of the gate marks the place where the banner of Muhammad was unfurled. The Grand Vizier or the commander going to war was entrusted with this banner in a solemn ceremony.

== Third Courtyard ==
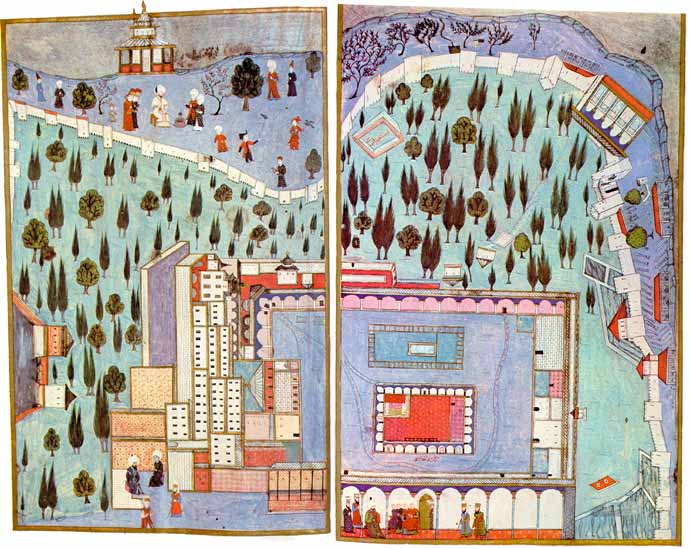
The Third Courtyard, depiction from the Hünername in 1584

Beyond the Gate of Felicity is the Third Courtyard (III. Avlu), also called the Inner Palace (Enderûn Avlusu). It is a garden surrounded by the Hall of the Privy Chamber (Has Oda), the treasury, the harem and the library of Ahmed III.

The Third Courtyard is surrounded by the quarters of the Ağas, court functionaries in the service of the sultan. They were taught the arts, such as music, painting and calligraphy. The best could become the Has Oda Ağası or high-ranking officials.

The layout of the Third Courtyard was established by Mehmed II. While Mehmed II would not sleep in the harem, successive sultans after him became more secluded and moved to the more intimate Fourth Courtyard and the harem section.

The Hünername miniature from 1584 shows the Third Courtyard and the surrounding outer gardens.

=== Audience Chamber ===
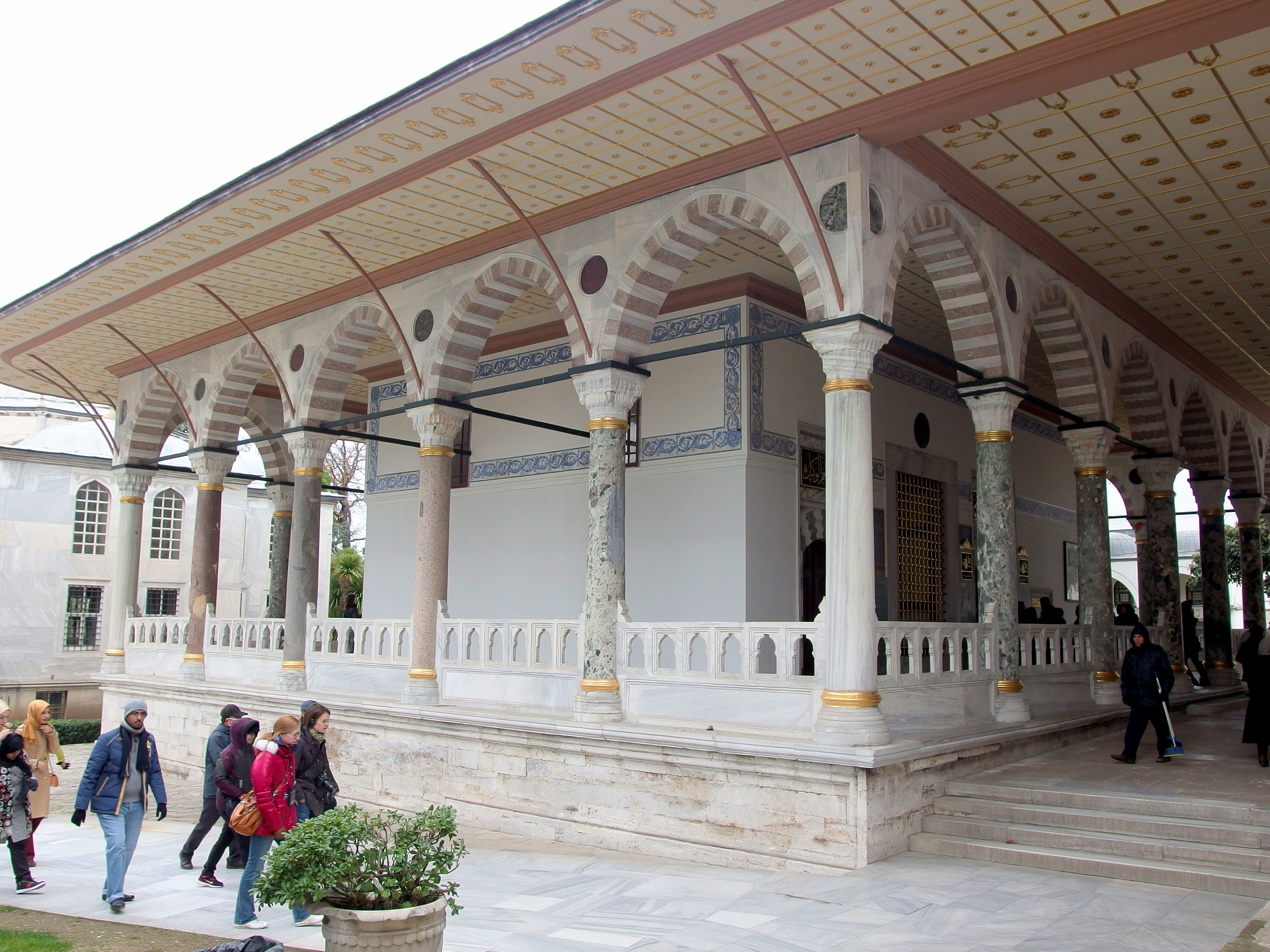
Arz Odası, the Audience Chamber

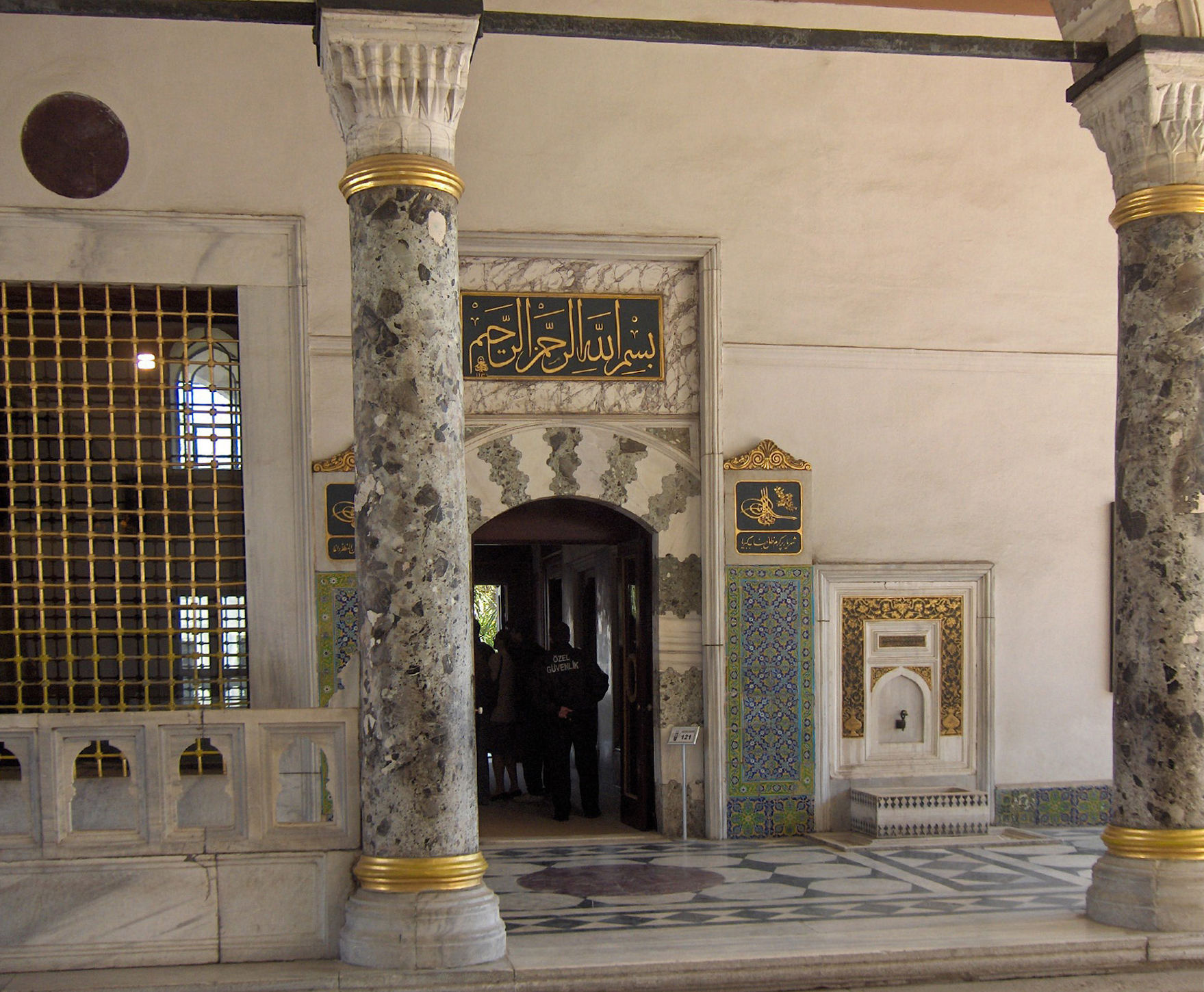
Main entrance to the Audience Chamber, with the small fountain of Suleiman I to the right, and the large gifts window to the left

The Audience Chamber, also known as the Chamber of Petitions (Arz Odası), is right behind the Gate of Felicity. This square building is an Ottoman kiosk, surrounded by a colonnade of 22 columns supporting the large roof with hanging eaves. The building dates from the 15th century. The ceiling of the chamber was painted in ultramarine blue and studded with golden stars. The walls were lined with blue, white and turquoise tiles. The chamber was further decorated with precious carpets and pillows. The chamber was renovated in 1723 by Sultan Ahmed III. It was destroyed in the fire of 1856 and rebuilt during the reign of Abdülmecid I.

The main throne room is located inside the audience chamber. According to a contemporary account by envoy Cornelius Duplicius de Schepper in 1533: "The Emperor was seated on a slightly elevated throne completely covered with gold cloth, replete and strewn with numerous precious stones, and there were on all sides many cushions of inestimable value; the walls of the chamber were covered with mosaic works spangled with azure and gold; the exterior of the fireplace of this chamber of solid silver and covered with gold, and at one side of the chamber from a fountain water gushed forth from a wall." The present throne in the form of a baldachin was made on the order of Mehmed III. On the lacquered ceiling of the throne, studded with jewels, are foliage patterns accompanied by the depiction of the fight of a dragon, symbol of power, with simurg, a mythical bird. On the throne there is a cover made of several pieces of brocade on which emerald and ruby plaques and pearls are sown.

Embossed inscriptions at the main visitors' door, dating from 1856, contain laudatory words for Sultan Abdülmecid I. The main door is surmounted by an embossed besmele, the common Muslim benediction, meaning "In the Name of God the Compassionate, the Merciful", dating from 1723. This inscription was added during the reign of Sultan Ahmed III. The tile panels on either side of the door were placed during later repair work.

There is a small fountain by the entrance from the time of Suleiman I. The Persian inscriptions calls the sultan "the fountainhead of generosity, justice and the sea of beneficence."

Gifts presented by ambassadors were placed in front of the large window in the middle of the main facade between the two doors. The Pişkeş Gate to the left (Pişkeş Kapısı, Pişkeş meaning gift brought to a superior) is surmounted by an inscription from the reign of Mahmud II, which dates from 1810.

Behind the Audience Chamber on the eastern side is the Dormitory of the Expeditionary Force (Seferli Koğuşu), which houses the Imperial Wardrobe Collection (Padişhah Elbiseleri Koleksiyonu). This collection is made up of around 2,500 garments, including the precious kaftans of the Sultans. It also houses a collection of 360 ceramic objects. The dormitory was constructed under Sultan Murad IV in 1635. The building was restored by Sultan Ahmed III in the early 18th century. The dormitory is vaulted and is supported by 14 columns. Adjacent to the dormitory, located northeast, is the Conqueror's Pavilion, which houses the Imperial Treasury.

=== The Imperial Treasury ===
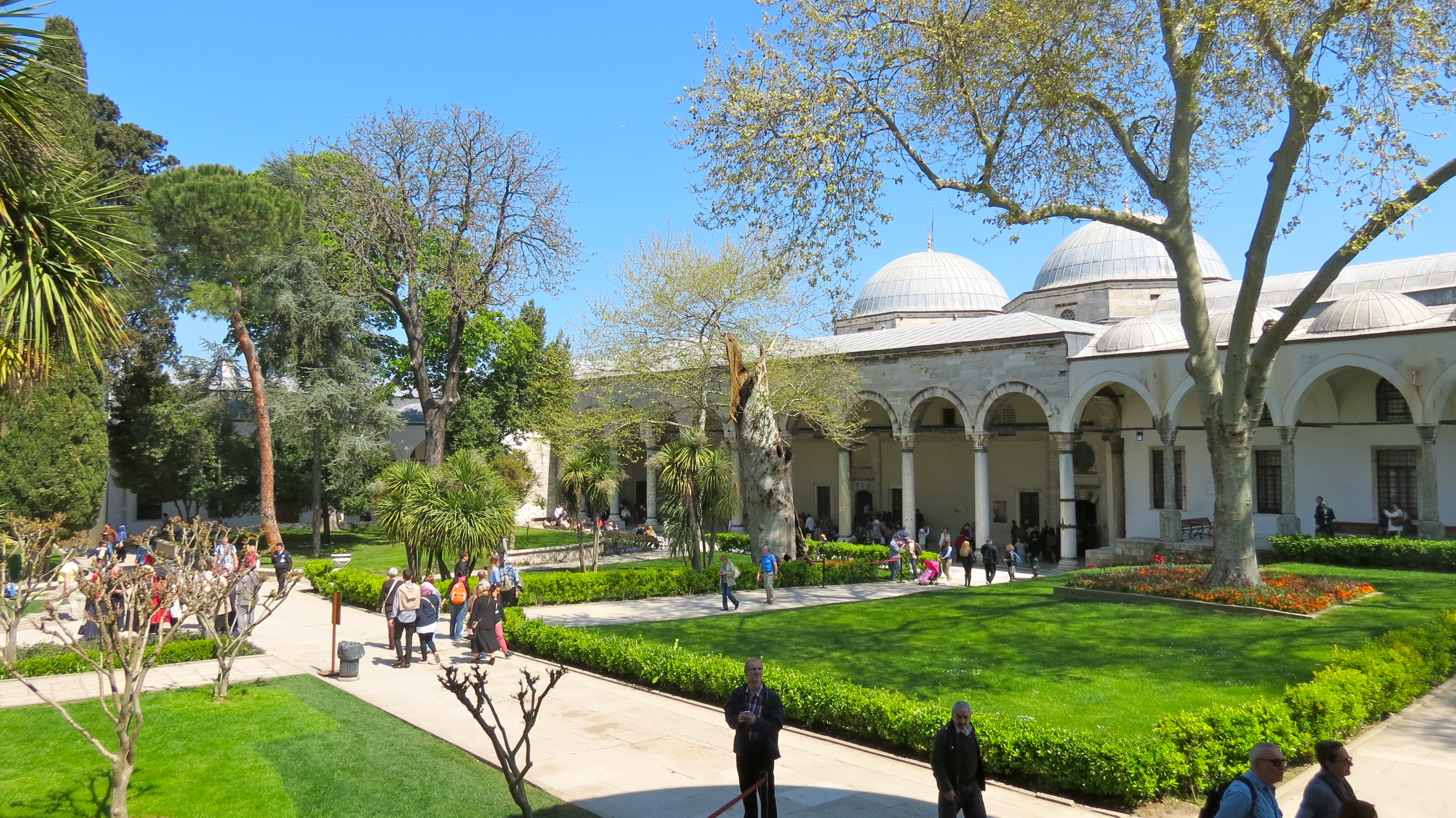
The Conqueror's Pavilion (Fatih Köşkü) houses the Imperial Treasury

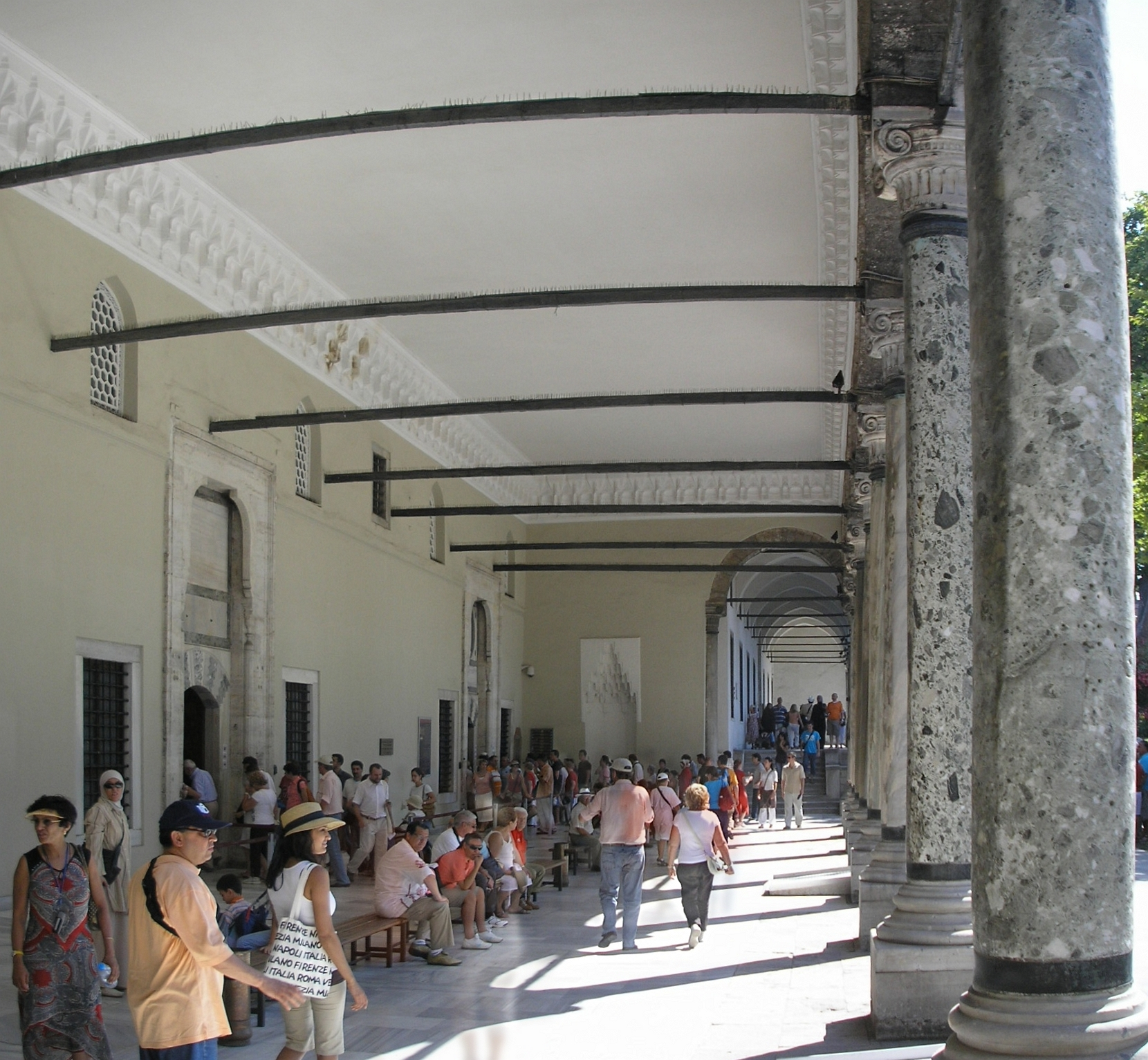
Hallway of the Conqueror's Pavilion

The Conqueror's Pavilion, also called the Conqueror's Kiosk (Fatih Köşkü) is one of the oldest buildings inside the palace. It was built c. 1460, when the palace was first constructed. It consists of two floors raised on a terrace above the garden, built at the top of the promontory on a cliff with views from its porch of the Sea of Marmara and the Bosporus. The lower floor consisted of service rooms, while the upper floor was a suite of four apartments and a large loggia with double arches. All the rooms open onto the Third Courtyard through a monumental arcade. The colonnaded portico on the side of the garden is connected to each of the four halls by a large door. The pavilion was used as the treasury for the revenues from Egypt under Sultan Selim I. During excavations in the basement, a small Byzantine baptistery built along a trefoil plan was found. It houses the Imperial Treasury (Hazine-i Âmire).

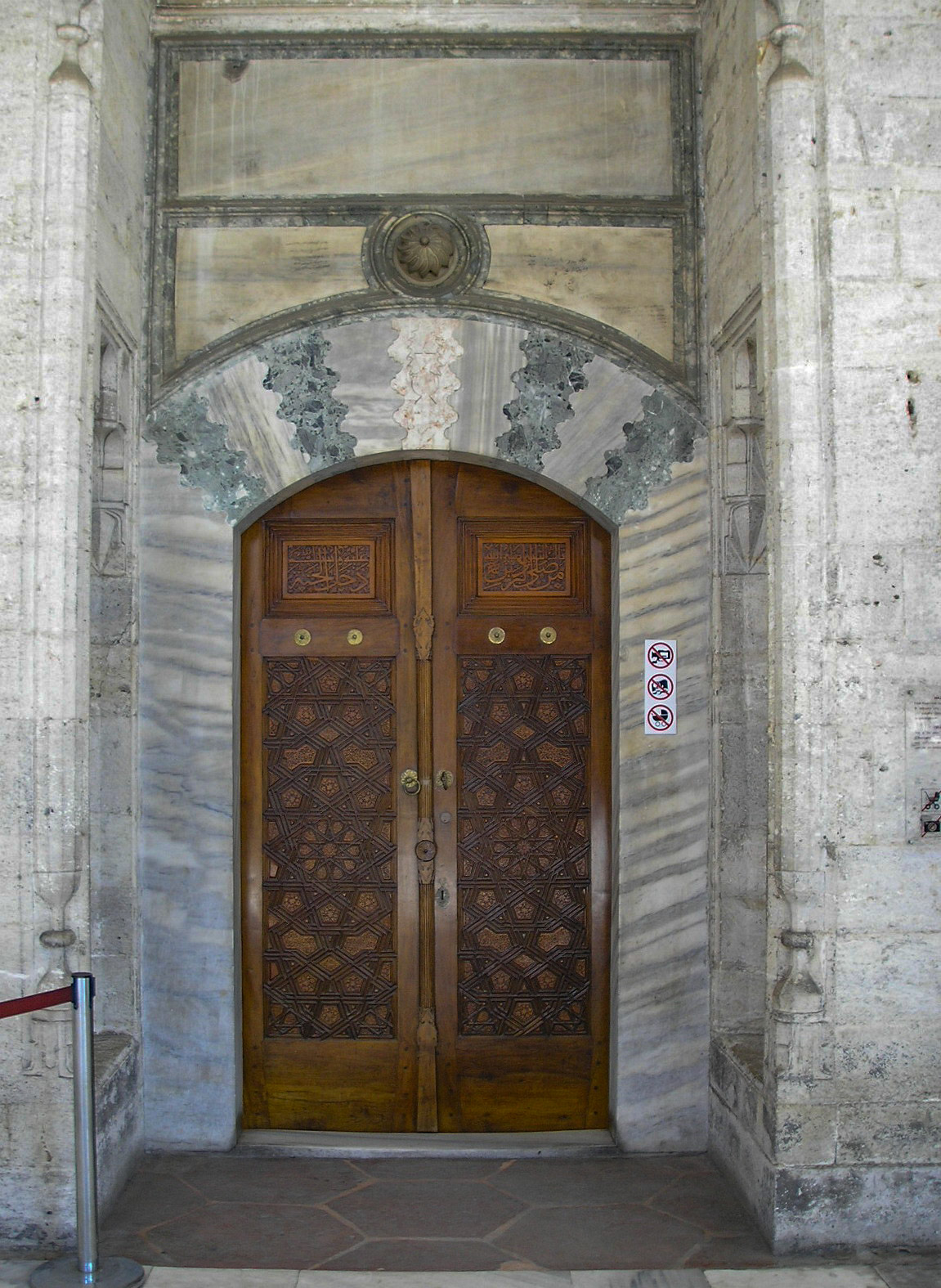
Door to the Imperial Treasury (Hazine-i Âmire)

The Imperial Treasury is a vast collection of artworks, jewelry, heirlooms and money belonging to the Ottoman dynasty. The Chief Treasurer (Hazinedarbaşı) was responsible for the Imperial Treasury.

The first room of the treasury houses one of the armours of Sultan Mustafa III, consisting of an iron coat of mail decorated with gold and encrusted with jewels. His gilded sword, shield and stirrups are also on display. The ebony throne of Murad IV, inlaid with nacre and ivory may also be found in this room. Other pieces include several pearl embellished Qur'an covers belonging to the sultans and jewel-encrusted looking glasses. There is a music box from India with a gold elephant dating from the 19th century.

The second room houses the Topkapı Dagger. The golden hilt is ornamented with three large emeralds, topped by a golden watch with an emerald lid. The golden scabbard is covered with diamonds and enamel. In 1747, the Sultan Mahmud I had this dagger made for Nader Shah of Persia, but the Shah was assassinated in connection with a revolt before the emissary had left the Ottoman Empire's boundaries. This dagger gained more fame as the object of the heist depicted of the film Topkapi. In the middle of the second room stands the walnut throne of Ahmed I, inlaid with nacre and tortoise shell, built by Sedekhar Mehmed Agha. Below the baldachin hangs a golden pendant with a large emerald. The next displays show the ostentatious aigrettes of the sultans and their horses, studded with diamonds, emeralds and rubies. A jade bowl, shaped like a vessel, was a present of Czar Nicholas II of Russia.

The most eye-catching jewel in the third room is the Spoonmaker's Diamond, set in silver and surrounded in two ranks with 49 cut diamonds. Legend has it that this diamond was bought by a vizier in a bazaar, the owner thinking it was a worthless piece of crystal. Another, perhaps more likely history for the gem places it among the possessions of Tepedeleni Ali Pasha, confiscated by the Sultan after his execution. Still more fanciful and romantic versions link the diamond's origins with Napoleon's mother Letizia Ramolino.

Among the exhibits are two enormous solid gold candleholders, each weighing 48 kg and mounted with 6,666 cut diamonds, a present of Sultan Abdülmecid I to the Kaaba in the holy city of Mecca. They were brought back to Istanbul shortly before the Ottoman Empire lost control over Mecca. The gold ceremonial Bayram throne, mounted with tourmalines, was made in 1585 by order of the vizier Ibrahim Pasha and presented to Sultan Murad III. This throne would be set up in front of the Gate of Felicity on special audiences.

The throne of Sultan Mahmud I is the centerpiece of the fourth room. This gold-plated throne in Indian style, decorated with pearls and emeralds, was a gift of the Persian ruler Nader Shah in the 18th century. Another exhibit shows the forearm and the hand of St. John the Baptist (Yahya), set in a golden covering. Several displays show an assembly of flintlock guns, swords, spoons, all decorated with gold and jewels. Of special interest is the gold shrine that used to contain the cloak of Mohammed.

=== Miniature and Portrait Gallery ===
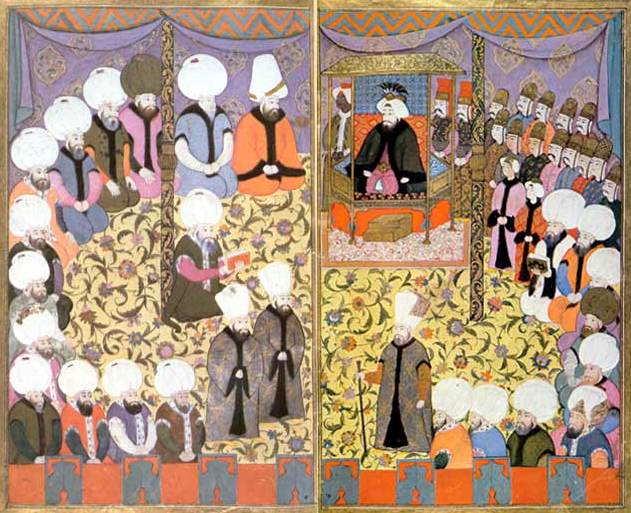
Scene from the Surname-ı Vehbi, located in the palace

Adjacent to the north of the Imperial Treasury lays the pages dormitory, which has been turned into the Miniature and Portrait Gallery (Müzesi Müdüriyeti). On the lower floor is a collection of important calligraphies and miniatures. In the displays, one can see old and very precious Qur'ans (12th to 17th centuries), hand-painted and hand-written in Kufic, and also a Bible from the 4th century, written in Arabic. A priceless item of this collection is the first world map by the Turkish admiral Piri Reis (1513). The map shows parts of the western coasts of Europe and North Africa with reasonable accuracy, and the coast of Brazil is also easily recognizable. The upper part of the gallery contains 37 portraits of different sultans, most of which are copies since the original paintings are too delicate to be publicly shown. The portrait of Mehmed II was painted by the Venetian painter Gentile Bellini. Other precious Ottoman miniature paintings that are either kept in this gallery, the palace library or in other parts are the Hünername, Şahanşahname, the Sarayı Albums, Siyer-ı Nebi, Surname-ı Hümayun, Surname-ı Vehbi, and the Süleymanname among many others.

=== Enderûn Library (Library of Ahmed III) ===
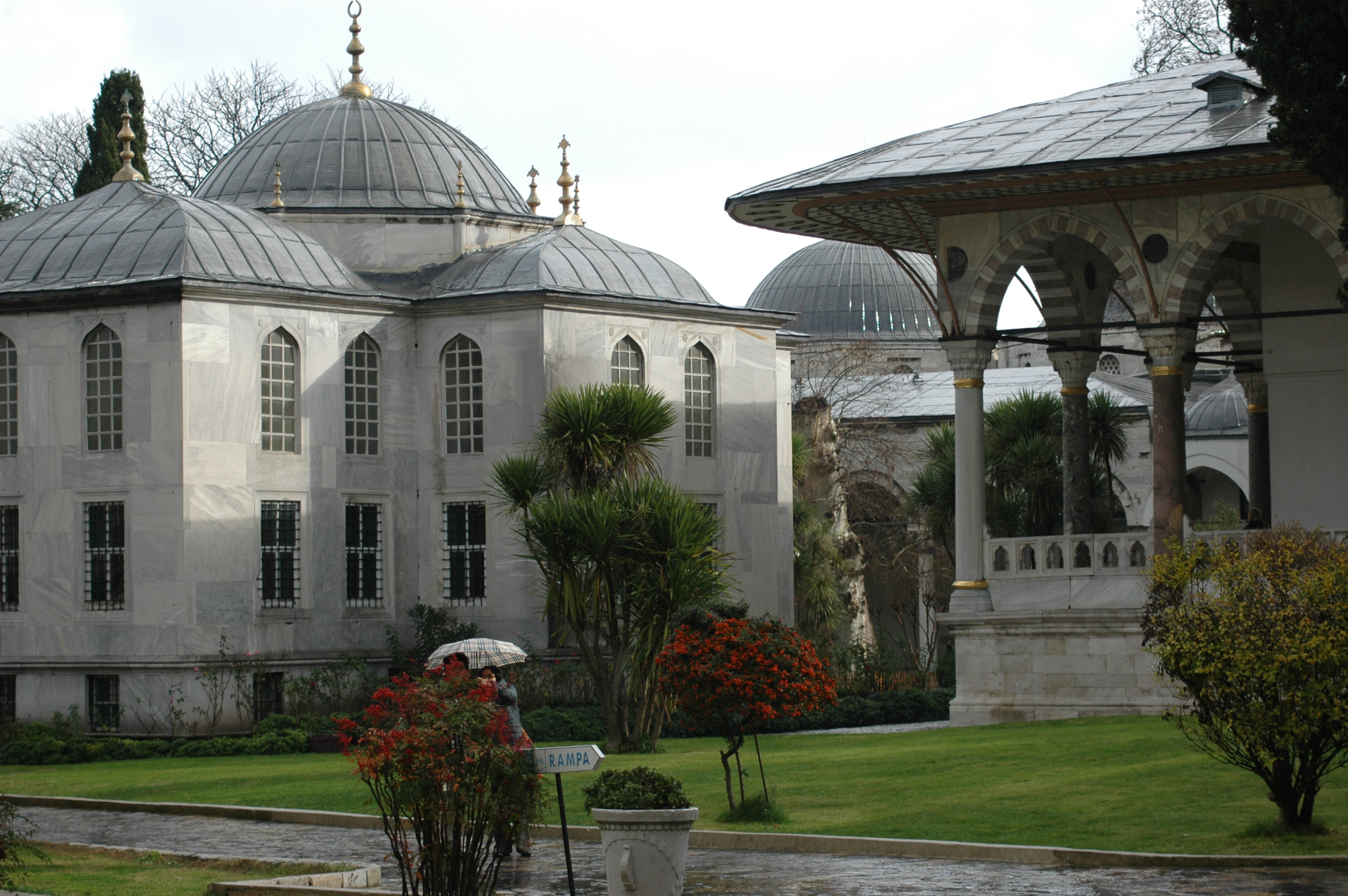
Enderûn Library, or Library of Sultan Ahmed III

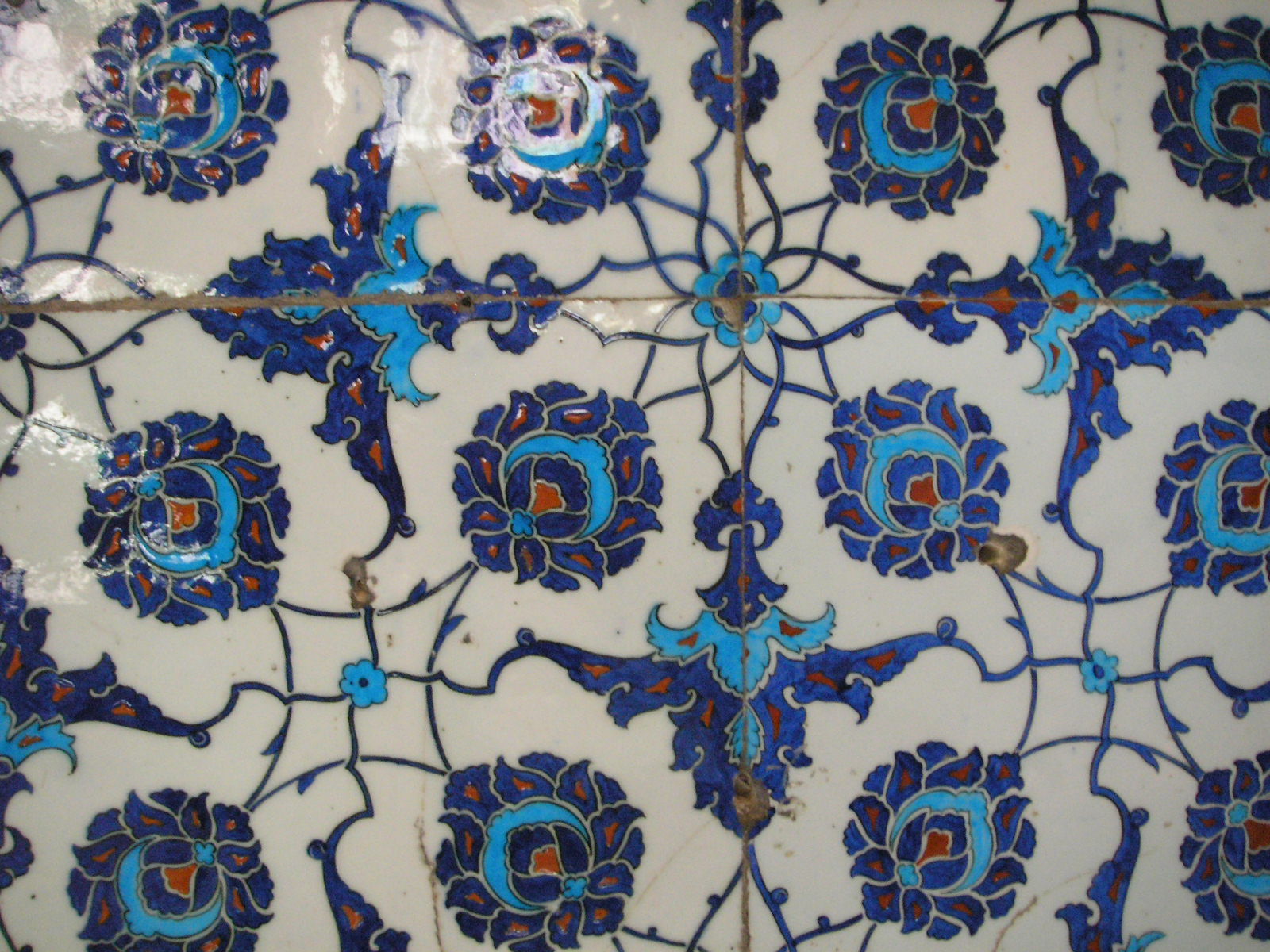
İznik tiles decorate the interior

The Neo-classical Enderûn Library (Enderûn Kütüphanesi), also known as "Library of Sultan Ahmed III" (III. Ahmed Kütüphanesi), is located directly behind the Audience Chamber (Arz Odası) in the centre of the Third Court. It was built on the foundations of the earlier Havuzlu kiosk by the royal architect Mimar Beşir Ağa in 1719 on orders of Ahmed III for use by officials of the royal household. The colonnade of this earlier kiosk now probably stands in front of the present Treasury.

The library is an example of Ottoman architecture of the 18th century. The exterior of the building is faced with marble. The library has the form of a Greek cross with a domed central hall and three rectangular bays. The fourth arm of the cross consists of the porch, which can be approached by a flight of stairs on either side. Beneath the central arch of the portico is an elaborate drinking fountain with niches on each side. The building is set on a low basement to protect the precious books of the library against moisture.

The walls above the windows are decorated with 16th- and 17th-century İznik tiles of variegated design. The central dome and the vaults of the rectangular bays have been painted. The decoration inside the dome and vaults are typical of the so-called Tulip period, which lasted from 1703 to 1730. The books were stored in cupboards built into the walls. The niche opposite the entrance was the private reading corner of the sultan.

The library contained books on theology, Islamic law and similar works of scholarship in Ottoman Turkish, Arabic and Persian. The library collection consisted of more than 3,500 manuscripts. Some are fine examples of inlay work with nacre and ivory. Today these books are kept in the Mosque of the Ağas (Ağalar Camii), which is located to the west of the library. One of the most important items there is the Topkapı manuscript, a copy of the Qur'an from the time of the third Caliph Uthman Ibn Affan. "The New Library," as it took to being called following the palace's museum designation, houses a unique collection containing more than 20,000 manuscripts—both Islamic and non-Islamic. The collection also boasts a wide array of valuable maps not found anywhere else in the world. The library contains several first edition copies of a variety of books, both Eastern and Western. The stunning collection of Islamic Miniatures exceeds 15,000. Additionally, the sultanate's private collection of 2,999 rare books is kept here as well. The rare and valuable collection also contains some of the world's finest examples of Islamic calligraphy. Over 3,000 Qurans written in Kufic script which date as far back as the eight century are kept in a special wing of the library called "The Rooms of the Sacred Trust".

The most precious books in the library are those hailing from the courts of the Ilkhanids—descendants of the Mongols—and their dynasties in 13th- and 14th-century Iran, and the exquisite books of the Timurid court in Herat of what is today Afghanistan. Persian manuscripts dating from the Safavi period (the 16th and 17th centuries) are also housed within the New Library and they are veritable works of art.

=== Mosque of the Ağas ===
The Mosque of the Ağas (Ağalar Camii) is the largest mosque in the palace. It is also one of the oldest constructions, dating from the 15th century during the reign of Mehmed II. The Sultan, the ağas and pages would come here to pray. The mosque is aligned in a diagonal line in the courtyard to make the minbar face Mecca. In 1928 the books of the Enderûn Library, among other works, were moved here as the Palace Library (Sarayı Kütüphanesi), housing a collection of about 13,500 Turkish, Arabic, Persian and Greek books and manuscripts, collected by the Ottomans. Located next to the mosque to the northeast is the Imperial Portraits Collection.

=== Dormitory of the royal pages ===
The Dormitory of the Royal Pages (Hasoda Koğuşu) houses the Imperial Portraits Collection (Padişah Portreleri Sergi Salonu) was part of the Sultan's chambers. The painted portraits depict all the Ottoman sultans and some rare photographs of the later ones, the latter being kept in glass cases. The room is air-conditioned and the temperature regulated and monitored to protect the paintings. Since the sultans rarely appeared in public, and to respect Islamic sensitivity to artistic depictions of people, the earlier portraits are idealisations. Only since the reforms of the moderniser Mahmud II have realistic portraits of the rulers been made. An interesting feature is a large painted family tree of the Ottoman rulers. The domed chamber is supported by pillars, some of Byzantine origin since a cross is engraved on one of them.

=== Privy Chamber ===
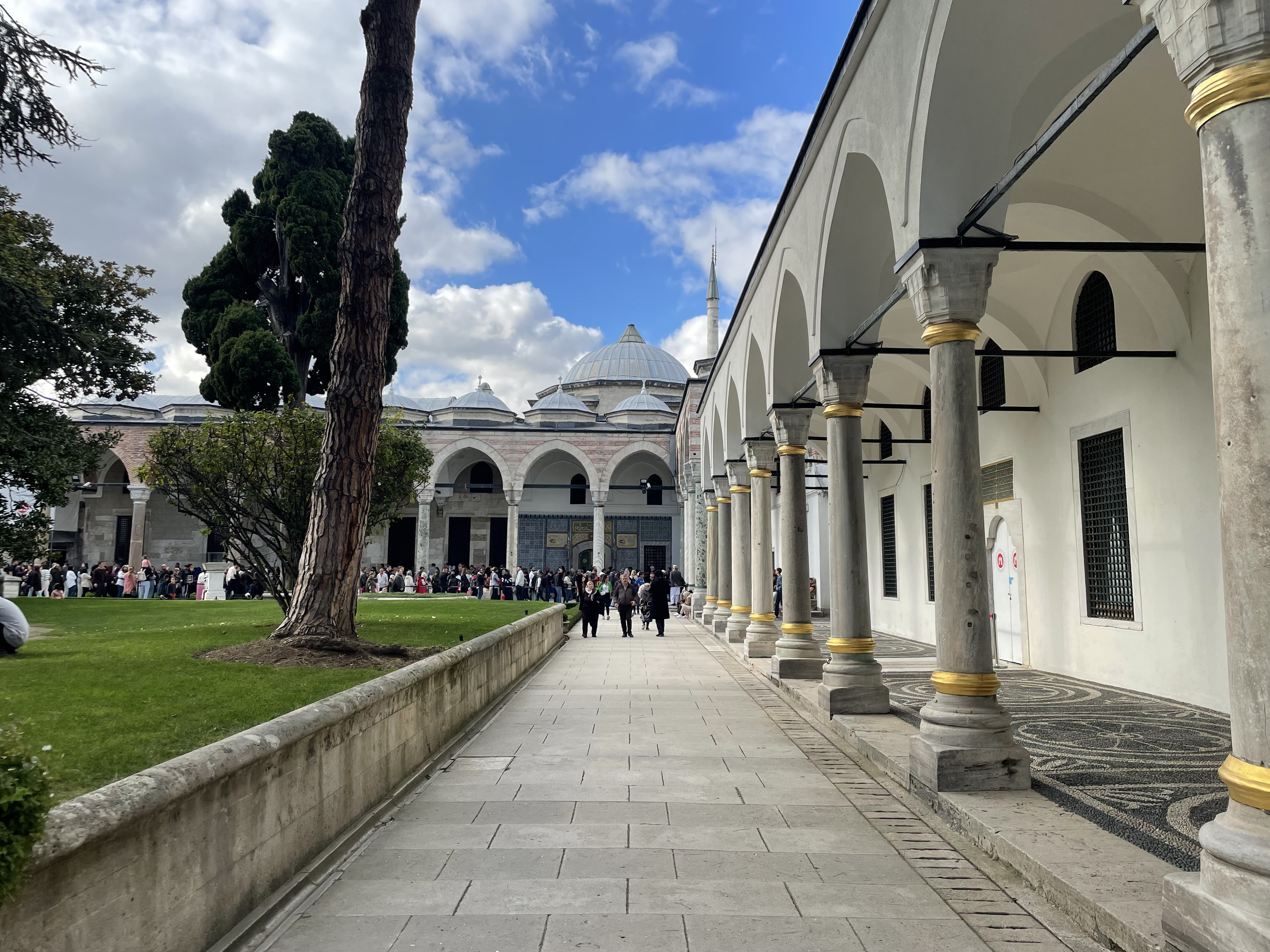
Privy Chamber from the courtyard

The Privy Chamber houses the Chamber of the Sacred Relics (Kutsal Emanetler Dairesi), which includes the Pavilion of the Holy Mantle. The chamber was constructed by Sinan under the reign of Sultan Murad III. It used to house offices of the Sultan.

It houses what are considered to be "the most sacred relics of the Muslim world": the cloak of Muhammad, two swords, a bow, one tooth, a hair of his beard, his battle sabres, an autographed letter and other relics which are known as the Sacred Trusts. Several other sacred objects are on display, such as the swords of the first four Caliphs, the Staff of Moses, the turban of Joseph and a carpet of the daughter of Mohammed. Even the Sultan and his family were permitted entrance only once a year, on the 15th day of Ramadan, during the time when the palace was a residence. Now any visitor can see these items, although in very dim light to protect the relics, and many Muslims make a pilgrimage for this purpose.

The Arcade of the Chamber of the Holy Mantle was added in the reign of Murad III, but was altered when the Circumcision Room was added. This arcade may have been built on the site of the Temple of Poseidon that was transformed before the 10th century into the Church of St. Menas.

The Privy Chamber was converted into an accommodation for the officials of the Mantle of Felicity in the second half of the 19th century by adding a vault to the colonnades of the Privy Chamber in the Enderun Courtyard.

== Harem ==
Layout of the Harem and the Sultan's Private Apartments. (click on image for details)

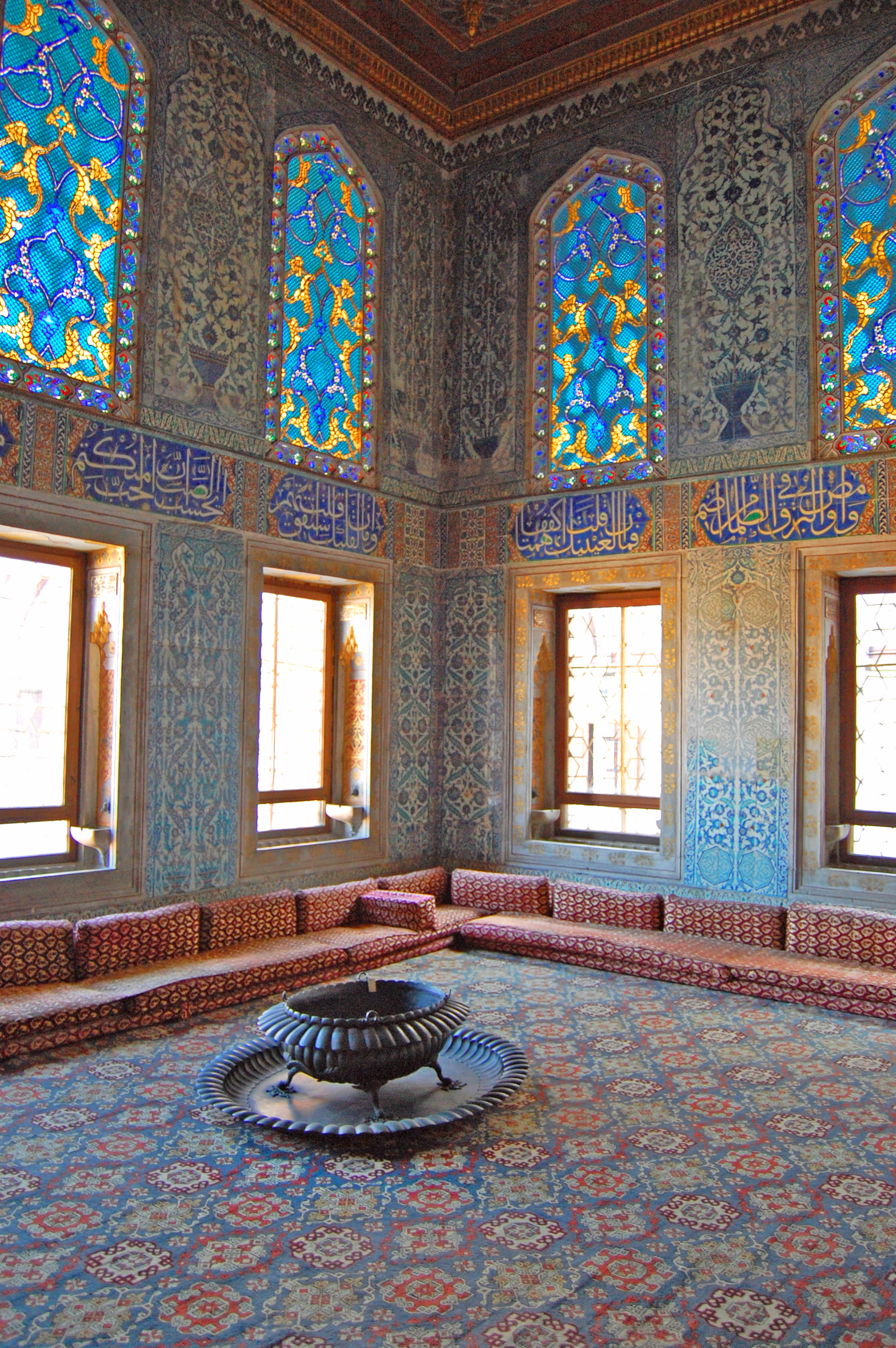
Tiled room inside Harem

The Imperial Harem (Harem-i Hümayûn) occupied one of the sections of the private apartments of the sultan; it contained more than 400 rooms. The harem was home to the sultan's mother, the Valide sultan; the concubines and wives of the sultan; and the rest of his family, including children; and their servants. The harem consists of a series of buildings and structures, connected through hallways and courtyards. Every service team and hierarchical group residing in the harem had its own living space clustered around a courtyard. The number of rooms is not determined, with probably over 100, of which only a few are open to the public. These apartments (Daires) were occupied respectively by the harem eunuchs, the Chief Harem Eunuch (Darüssaade Ağası), the concubines, the queen mother, the sultan's consorts, the princes and the favourites. There was no trespassing beyond the gates of the harem, except for the sultan, the queen mother, the sultan's consorts and favourites, the princes and the concubines as well as the eunuchs guarding the harem.

The harem wing was only added at the end of the 16th century. Many of the rooms and features in the Harem were designed by Mimar Sinan. The harem section opens into the Second Courtyard (Divan Meydanı), which the Gate of Carriages (Arabalar Kapısı) also opens to. The structures expanded over time towards the Golden Horn side and evolved into a huge complex. The buildings added to this complex from its initial date of construction in the 15th century to the early 19th century capture the stylistic development of palace design and decoration. Parts of the harem were redecorated under the sultans Mahmud I and Osman III in an Italian-inspired Ottoman Baroque style. These decorations contrast with those of the Ottoman classical age.

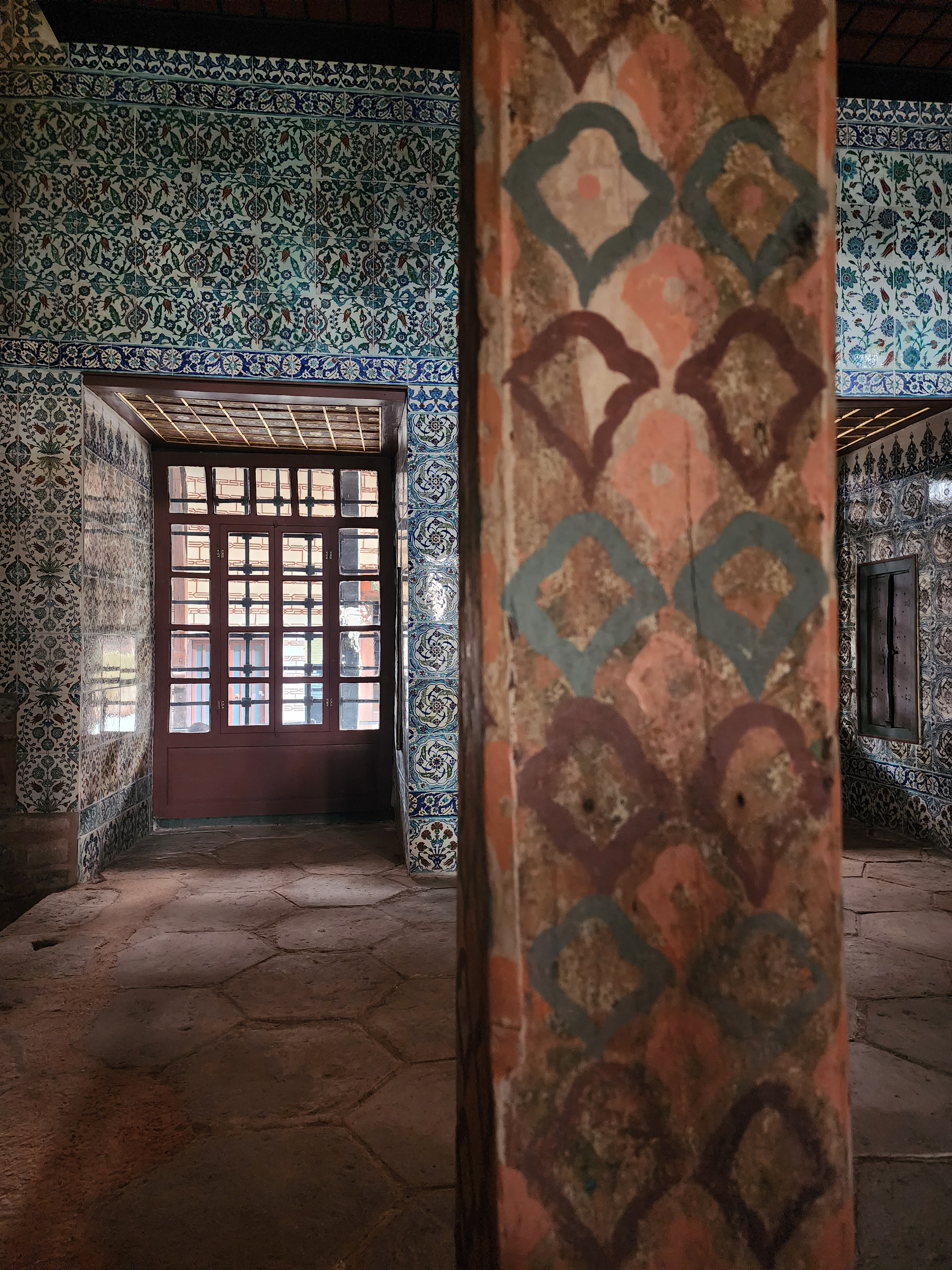
The first room visitors to the harem enter

=== Gate of Carts/Domed Cupboard Chamber ===
The entrance gate from the Second Courtyard is the Gate of Carts (Arabalar Kapısı), which leads into the Domed Cupboard Room (Dolaplı Kubbe). This place was built as a vestibule to the harem in 1587 by Murad III. The harem treasury worked here. In its cupboards, records of deeds of trust were kept, administered by the Chief Harem Eunuch. This treasury stored money from the pious foundations of the harem and other foundations, and financial records of the sultans and the imperial family.

=== Hall of the Ablution Fountain ===
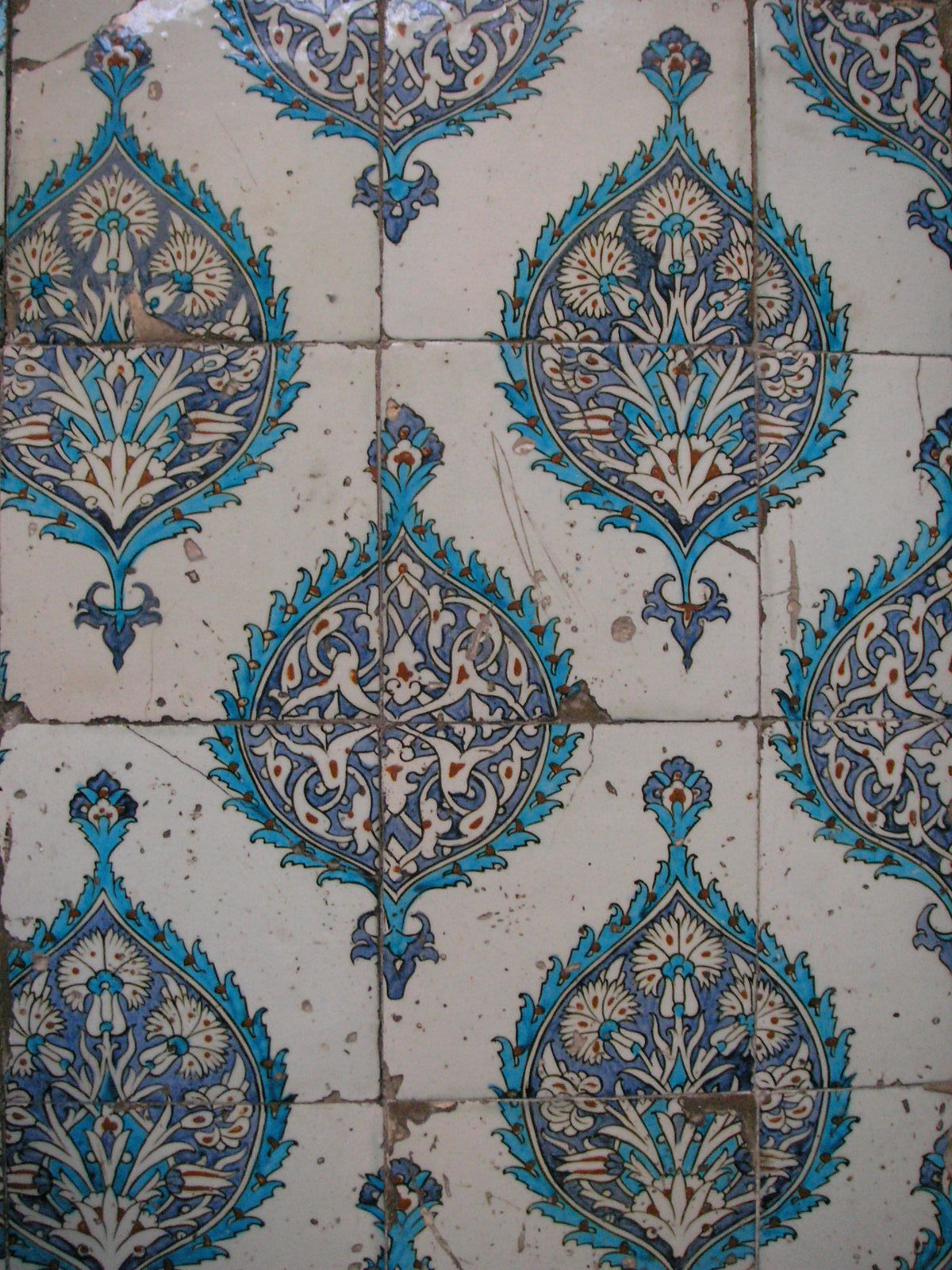
Detail of the hall of the Ablution Fountain

The Hall of the Ablution Fountain, also known as "Sofa with Fountain" (Şadirvanli Sofa), was renovated after the Harem fire of 1666. This second great fire took place on 24 July 1665. This space was an entrance hall into the harem, guarded by the harem eunuchs. The Büyük Biniş and the Şal Kapısı, which connected the Harem, the Privy Garden, the Mosque of the Harem Eunuchs and the Tower of Justice from where the sultan watched the deliberations of the Imperial Council, led to this place. The walls are revetted with 17th-century Kütahya tiles. The horse block in front of the mosque served the sultan to mount his horse and the sitting benches were for the guards. The fountain that gives the space its name was moved and is now in the pool of the Privy Chamber of Murad III.

On the left is the small mosque of the black eunuchs. The tiles in watery green, dirty white and middle blue all date from the 17th century (reign of Mehmed IV). Their design is of a high artistic level but the execution is of minor quality compared to 16th-century tiles, and the paint on these tiles blurs.

=== Courtyard of the Eunuchs ===
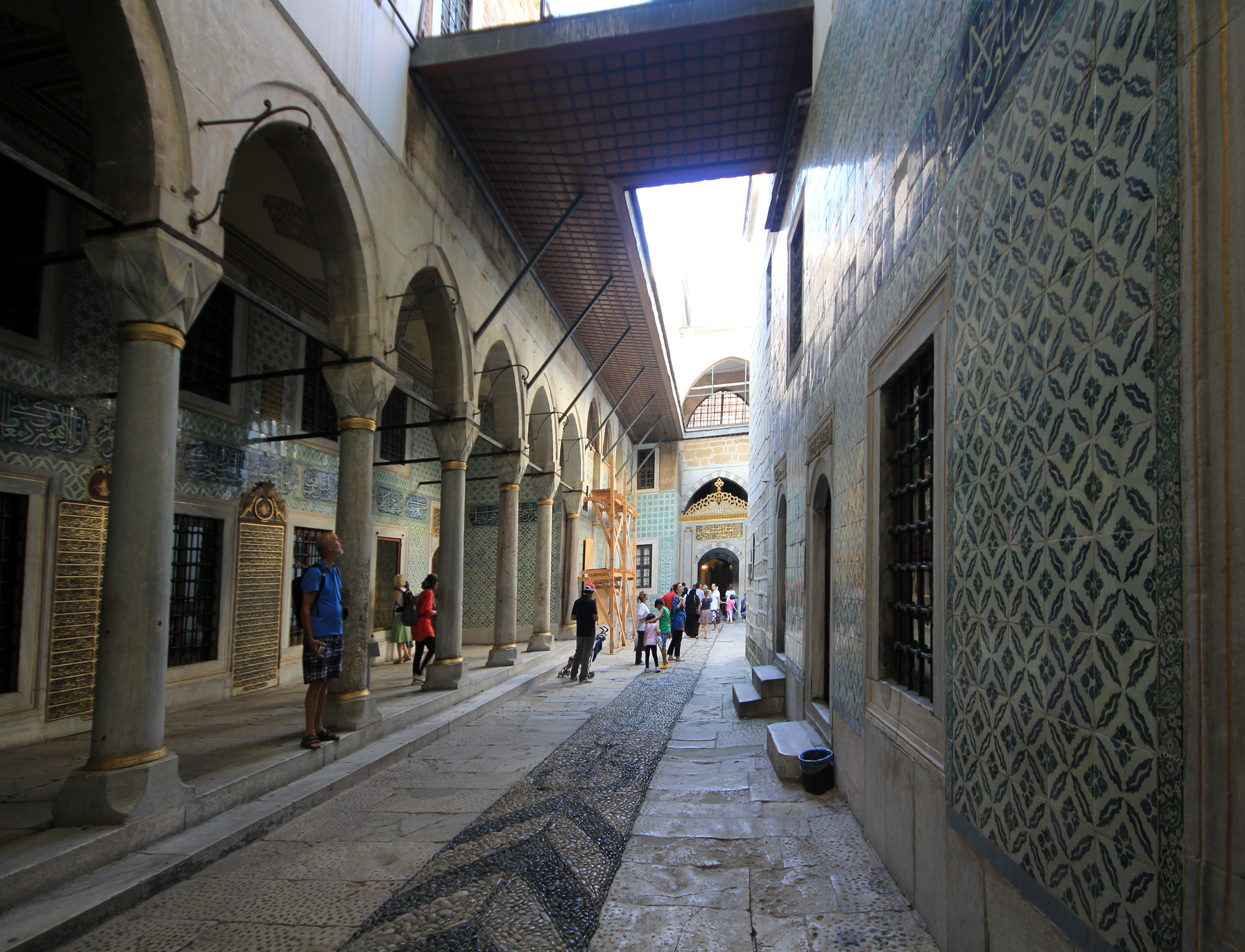
The Courtyard of the Eunuchs

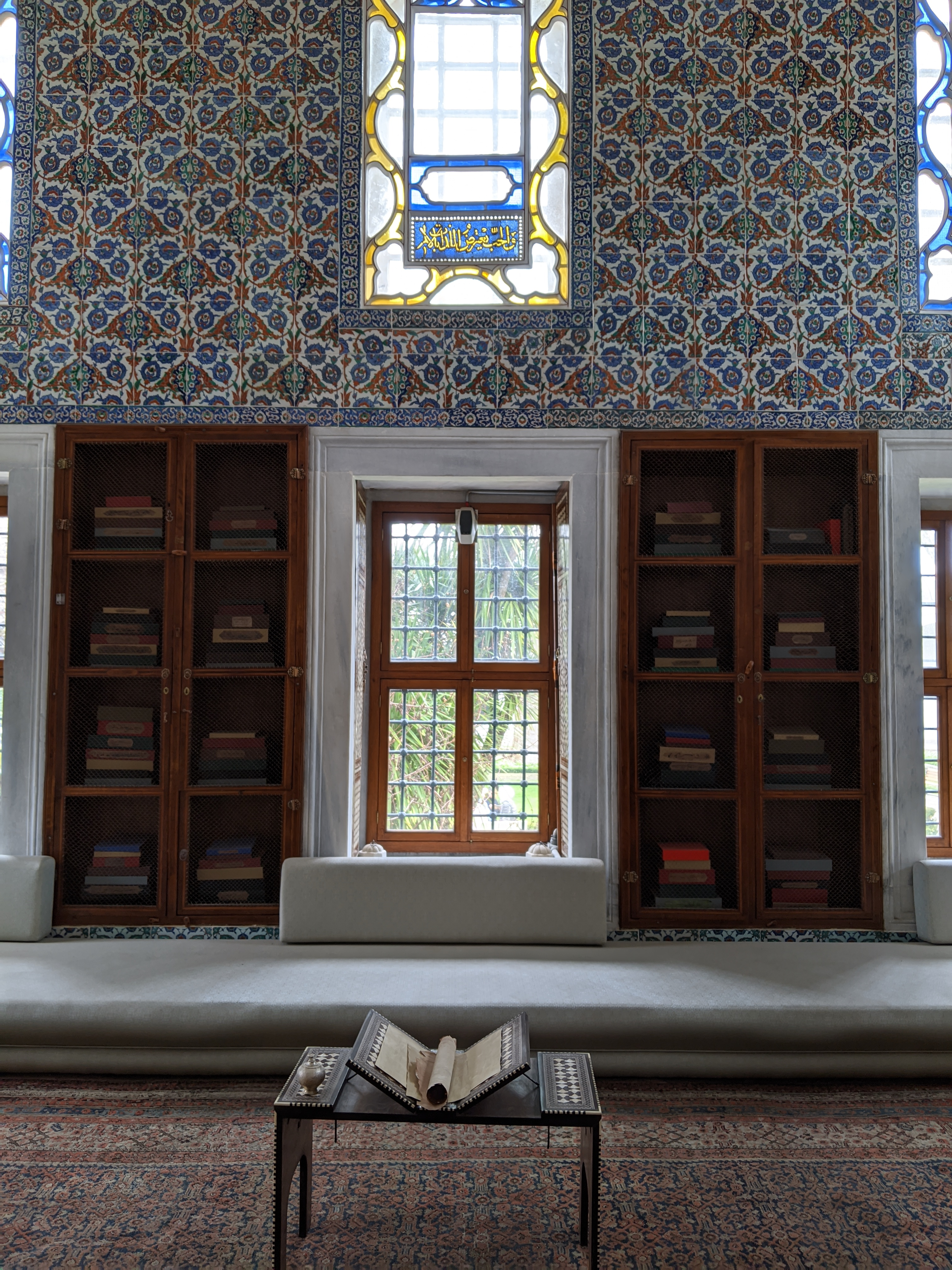
Reconstruction of an Ottoman style library, in the Topkapı Palace museum

Another door leads to the Courtyard of the (Black) Eunuchs (Harem Ağaları Taşlığı), with their apartments on the left side. At the end of the court is the apartment of the black chief eunuch (Kızlar Ağası), the fourth high-ranking official in the official protocol. In between is the school for the imperial princes, with precious tiles from the 17th and 18th centuries and gilded wainscoting. At the end of the court is the main gate to the harem (Cümle Kapısi). The narrow corridor on the left side leads to the apartments of the odalisques (white slaves given as a gift to the sultan).

Many of the eunuchs’ quarters face this courtyard, which is the first one of the Harem, since they also acted as guards under the command of the Chief Harem Eunuch. The spaces surrounding this courtyard were rebuilt after the great fire of 1665. The complex includes the dormitory of the Harem eunuchs behind the portico, the quarters of the Chief Harem Eunuch (Darüssaade Ağası) and the School of Princes as well as the Gentlemen-in-Waiting of the Sultan (Musahipler Dairesi) and the sentry post next to it. The main entrance gate of the Harem and the gate of the Kuşhane connected the Enderûn court leads out into the Kuşhane door.

The dormitories of the Harem eunuchs (Harem Ağaları Koğuşu) date to the 16th century. They are arranged around an inner courtyard in three storeys. The inscription on the façade of the dormitory includes the deeds of trust of the Sultans Mustafa IV, Mahmud II and Abdülmejid I dating from the 19th century. The rooms on the upper stories were for novices and those below overlooking the courtyard were occupied by the eunuchs who had administrative functions. There is a monumental fireplace revetted with the 18th-century Kütahya tiles at the far end. The Chief Harem Eunuch's apartment (Darüssaade Ağasi Dairesi) adjacent to the dormitory contains a bath, living rooms and bedrooms. The school room of the princes under the control of the Chief Harem eunuch was on the upper story. The walls were revetted with 18th-century European tiles with baroque decorations.

=== Harem main entrance ===
The main entrance (Cümle Kapisi) separates the harem in which the family and the concubines of the sultan resided from the Courtyard of the Eunuchs. The door leads out into the sentry post (Nöbet Yeri) to which the three main sections of the harem are connected. The door on the left of the sentry post leads through the Passage of the Concubines to the Court of the Concubines (Kadınefendiler Taşlığı). The door in the middle leads to the Court of the Queen Mother (Valide Taşlığı) and the door to the right leads through the Golden Road (Altınyol) to the sultan's quarters. The large mirrors in this hall date from the 18th century.

=== Courtyard of the Queen Mother ===
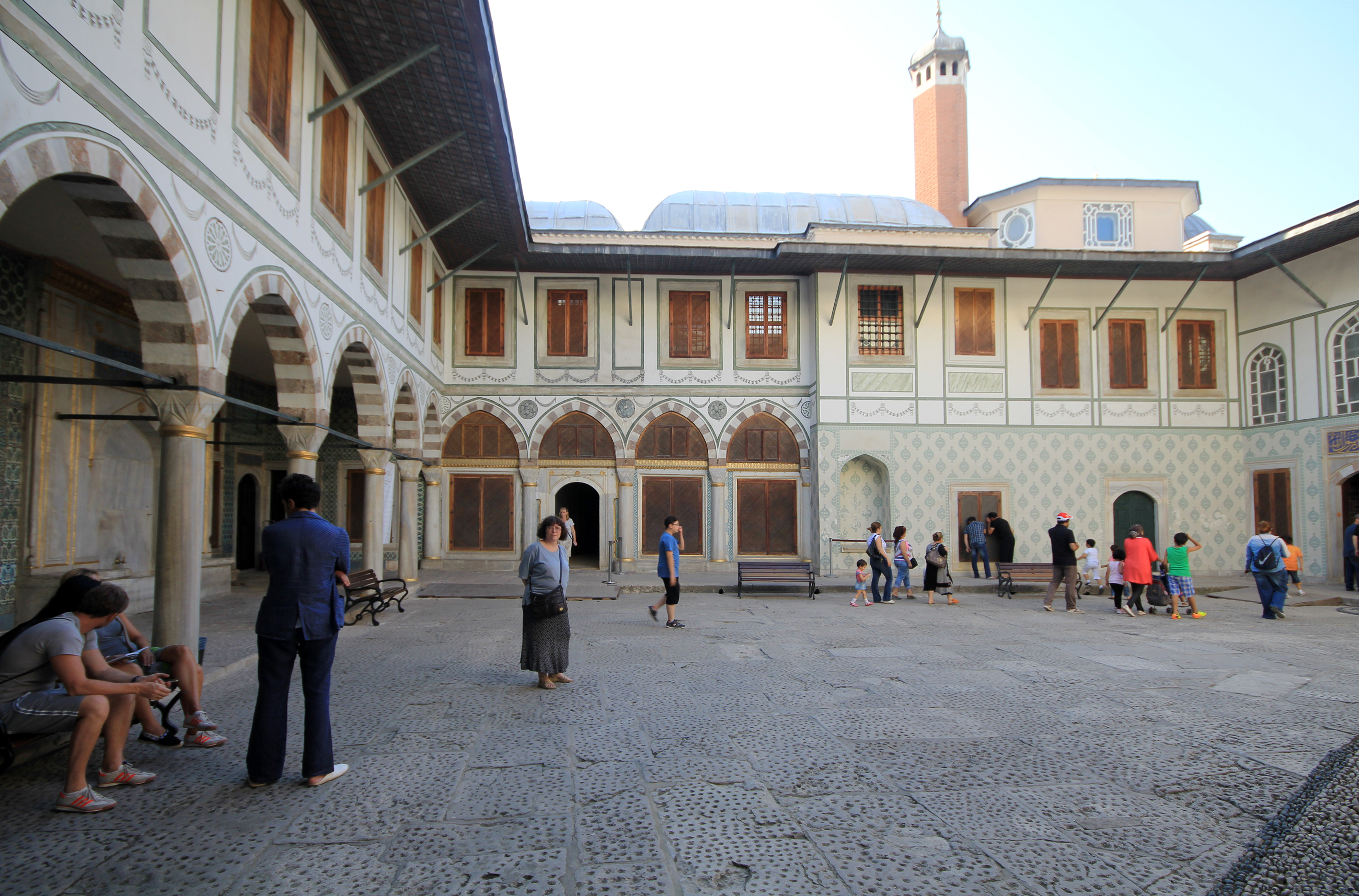
Courtyard of the Apartments of the Queen Mother (Valide Sultan Dairesi)

After the main entrance and before turning to the Passage of Concubines is the Courtyard of the Queen Mother.

=== Passage of Concubines ===
The Passage of Concubines (Cariye Koridoru) leads into the Courtyard of the Sultan's Chief Consorts and Concubines. On the counters along the passage, the eunuchs placed the dishes they brought from the kitchens in the palace.

=== Courtyard of the Sultan's Consorts and the Concubines ===
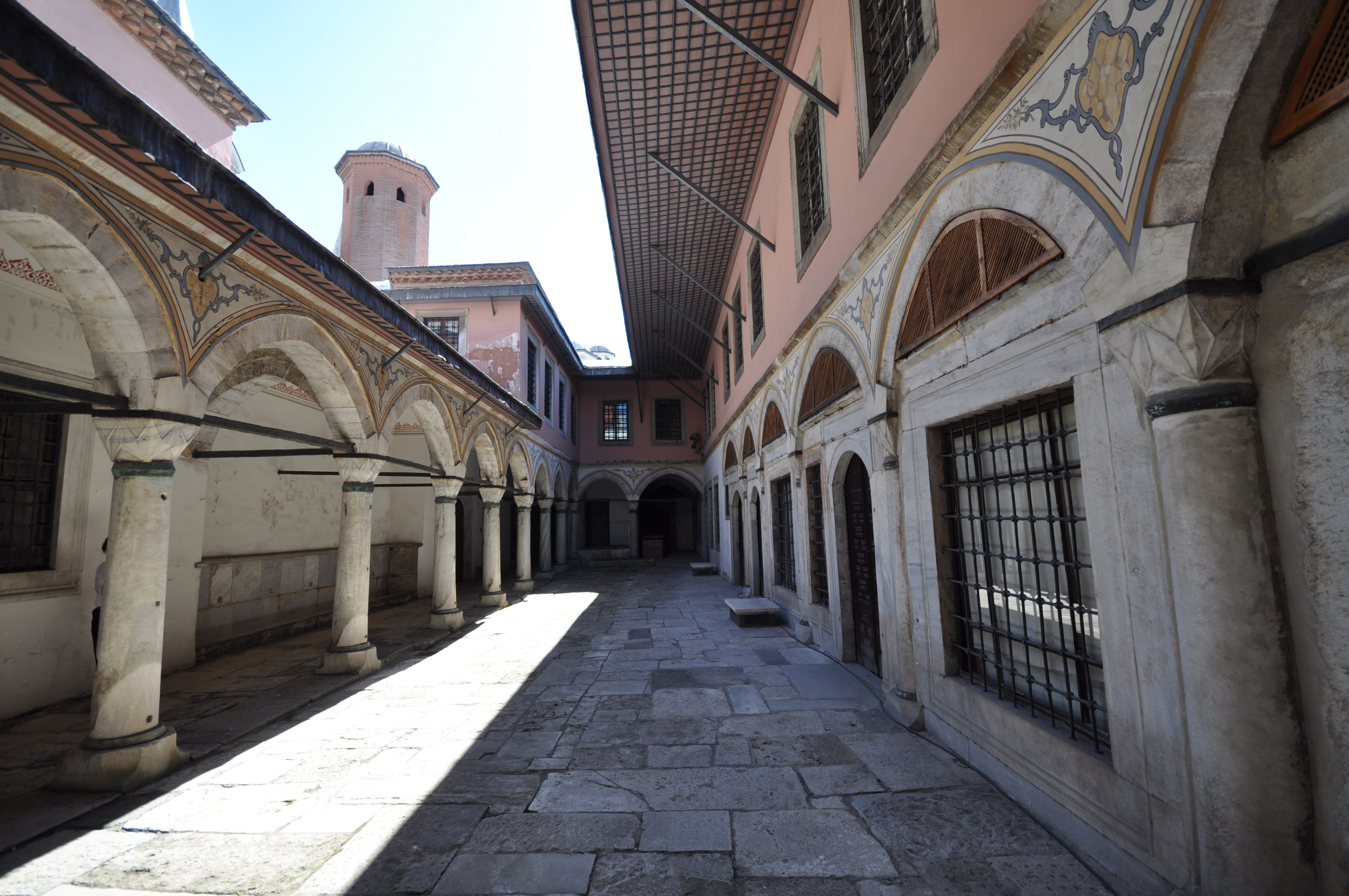
Courtyard of the Concubines

The Courtyard of the Sultan's Consorts and the Concubines (Kadın Efendiler Taşlığı / Cariye Taşlığı) was constructed at the same time as the courtyard of the eunuchs in the middle of the 16th century. It underwent restoration after the 1665 fire and is the smallest courtyard of the Harem. The porticoed courtyard is surrounded by baths (Cariye Hamamı), a laundry fountain, a laundry, dormitories, the apartments of the Sultan's chief consort and the apartments of the stewardesses (Kalfalar Dairesi). The three independent tiled apartments with fireplaces overlooking the Golden Horn were the quarters where the consorts of the Sultan lived. These constructions covered the site of the courtyard in the late 16th century. At the entrance to the quarters of the Queen Mother, wall frescoes from the late 18th century depict landscapes, reflecting the western influence. The staircase, called the "Forty Steps" (Kirkmerdiven), leads to the Hospital of the Harem (Harem Hastanesi), the dormitories of the concubines at the basement of the Harem and Harem Gardens.

=== Apartments of the Queen Mother ===
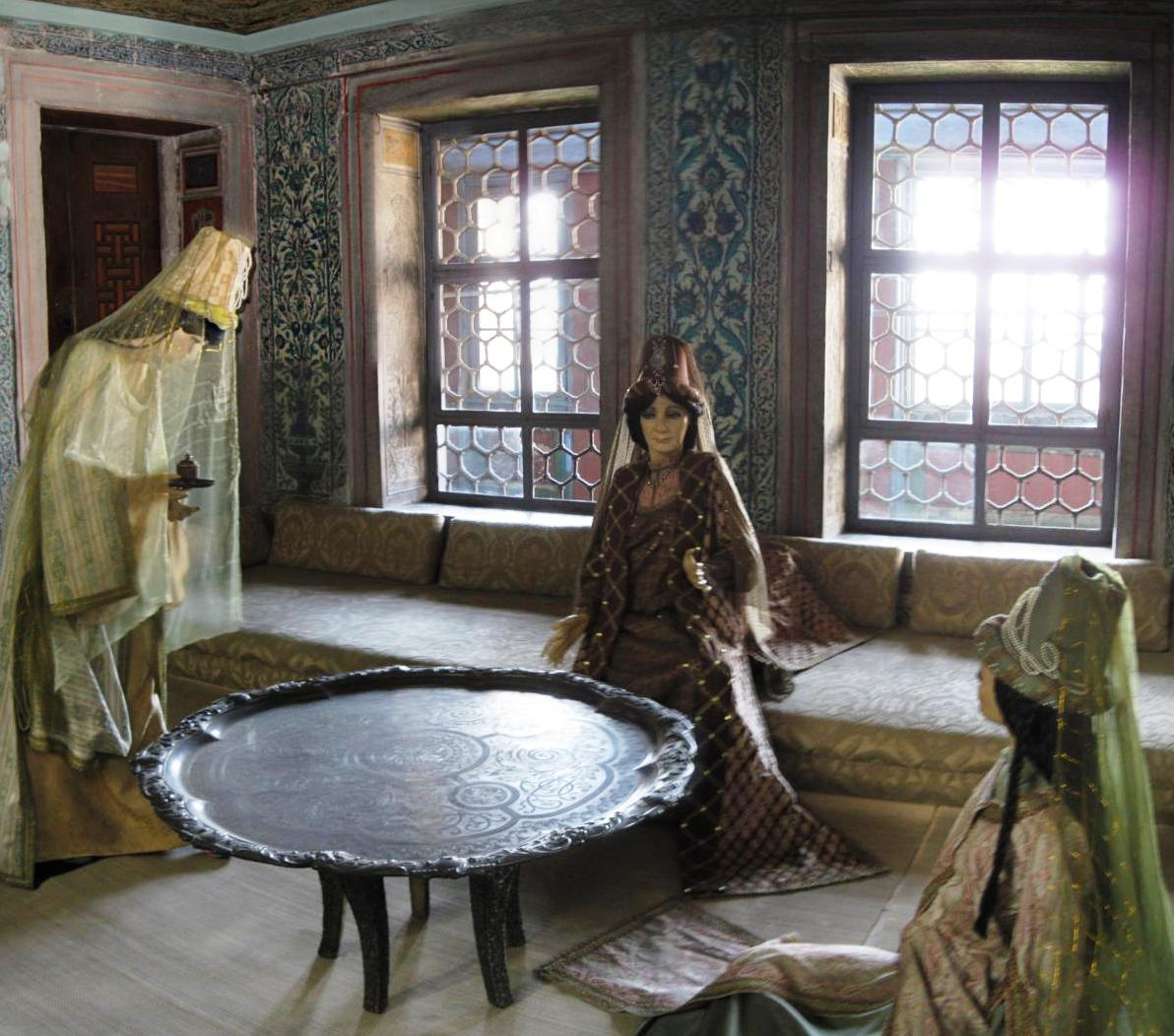
Exhibit representing the Queen Mother and her attendants in her apartments

The Apartments of the Queen Mother (Valide Sultan Dairesi), together with the apartments of the sultan, form the largest and most important section in the harem. It was constructed after the Queen Mother moved into the Topkapı Palace in the late 16th century from the Old Palace (Eski Saray), but had to be rebuilt after the fire of 1665 between 1666 and 1668. Some rooms, such as the small music room, have been added to this section in the 18th century. Only two of these rooms are open to the public: the dining room with, in the upper gallery, the reception room and her bedroom with, behind a lattice work, a small room for prayer. On the lower stories of the apartments are the quarters of the concubines, while the upper story rooms are those of the Queen Mother and her ladies-in-waiting (kalfas). The apartments of the Queen Mother are connected by a passage, leading into the Queen Mother's bathroom, to the quarters of the sultan.

These are all enriched with blue-and-white or yellow-and-green tiles with flowery motifs and İznik porcelain from the 17th century. The panel representing Mecca or Medina, signed by Osman İznikli Mehmetoğlu, represents a new style in İznik tiles. The paintwork with panoramic views in the upper rooms is in the Western European style of the 18th and 19th centuries.

Situated on top of the apartments of the Queen Mother are the apartments of Mihirisah in the rococo style. Leading from the apartments to the baths lays the apartment of Abdül Hamid I. Close to that is Selim's III love chamber constructed in 1790. A long, narrow corridor connects this to the kiosk of Osman III dated to 1754.

=== Baths of the Sultan and the Queen Mother ===
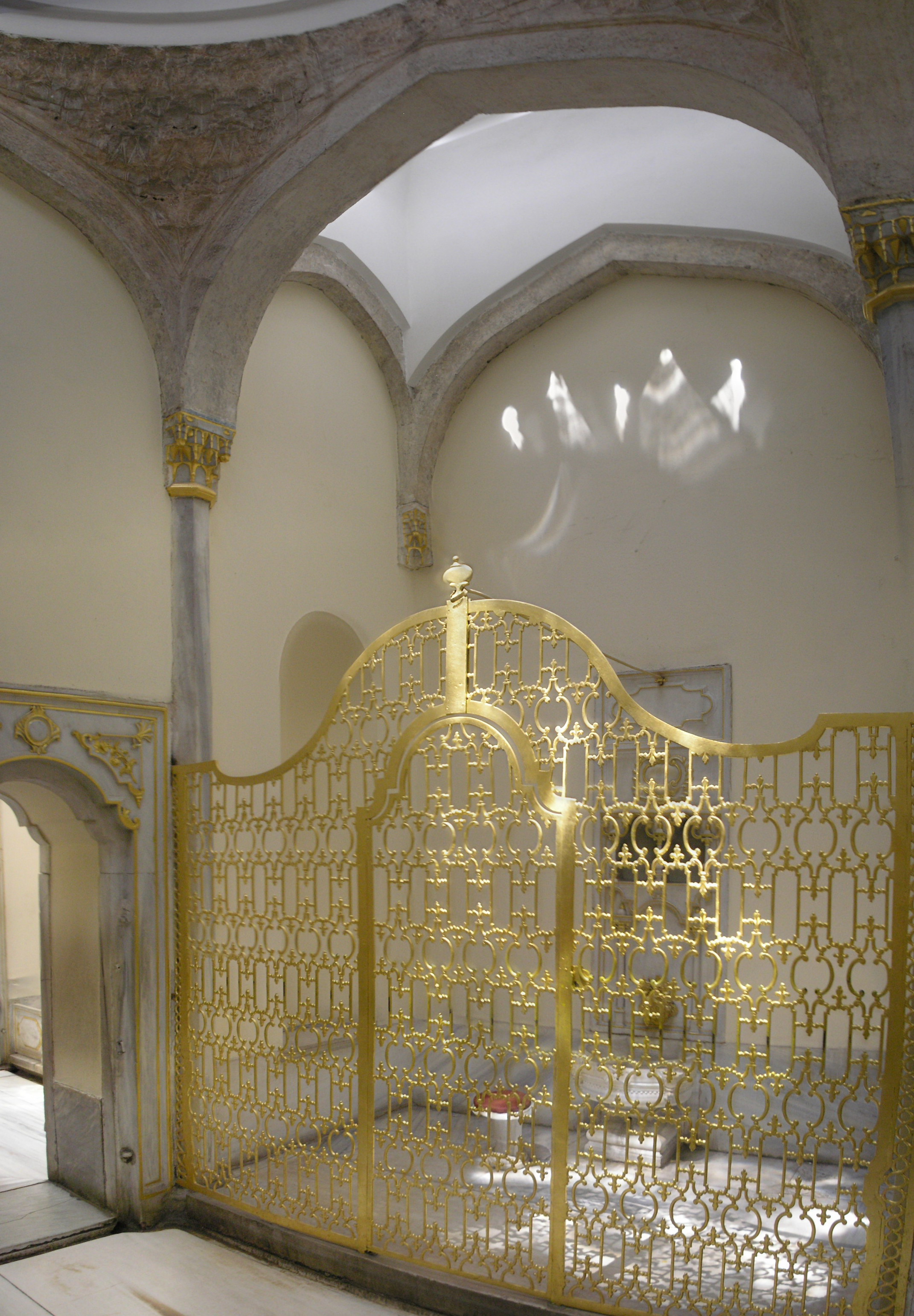
Baths of the Sultan with gilded grill

The next rooms are the Baths of the Sultan and the Queen Mother (Hünkâr ve Vâlide Hamamları). This double bath dates from the late 16th century and consists of multiple rooms. It was redecorated in the rococo style in the middle of the 18th century. Both baths present the same design, consisting of a caldarium, a tepidarium and a frigidarium. Each room either has a dome, or the ceilings are at some point glassed in a honeycomb structure to let the natural sunlight in. The floor is clad in white and grey marble. The marble tub with an ornamental fountain in the caldarium and the gilded iron grill are characteristic features. The golden lattice work was to protect the bathing sultan or his mother from murder attempts. The sultan's bath was decorated by Sinan with high-quality İznik polychrome tiles. But much of the tile decoration of the harem, from structures damaged by the fire of 1574, was recycled by Sultan Ahmed I for decoration in his new Sultan Ahmed Mosque in Istanbul. The walls are now either clad in marble or white-washed.

=== Imperial Hall ===
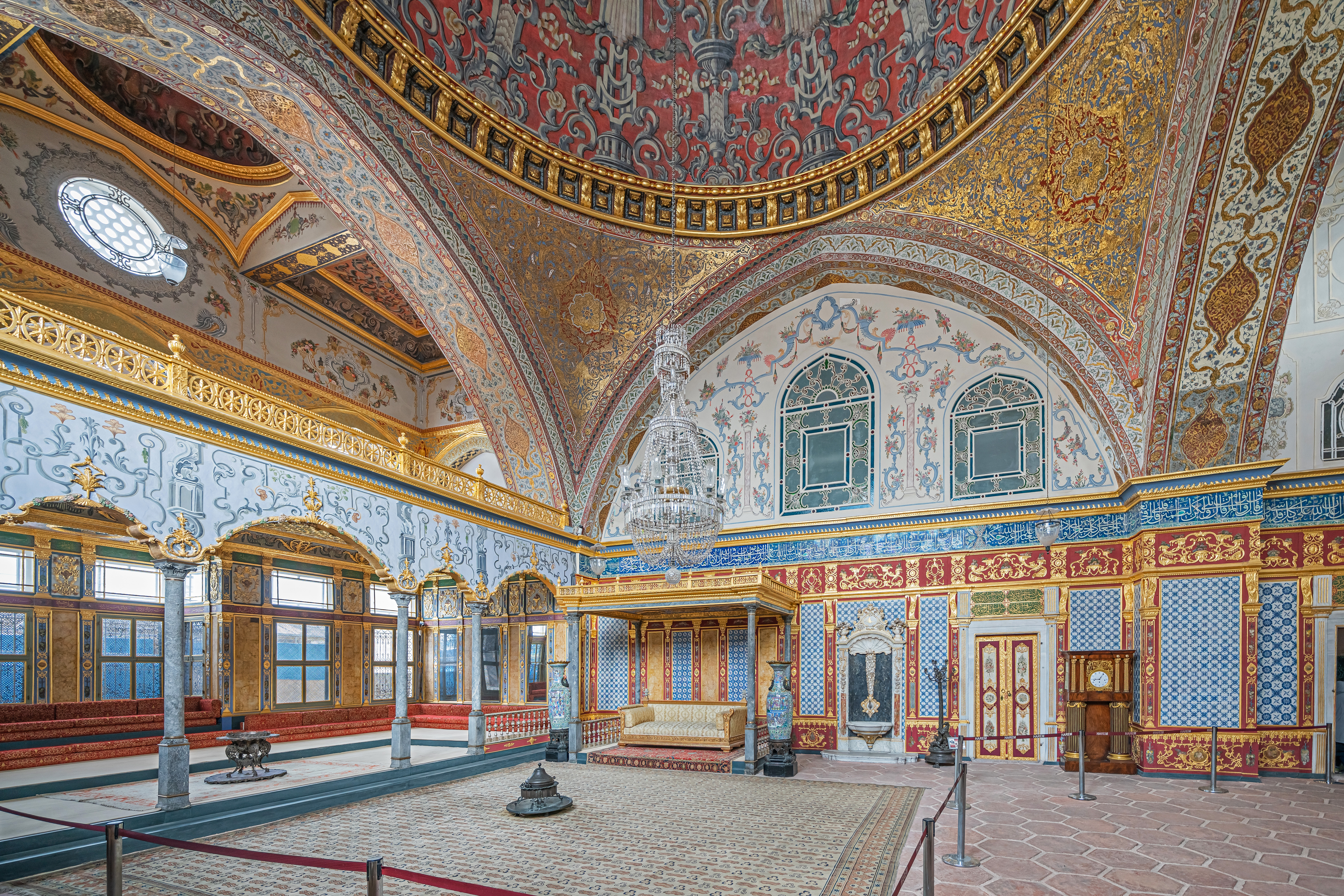
Imperial Hall with the throne of the sultan

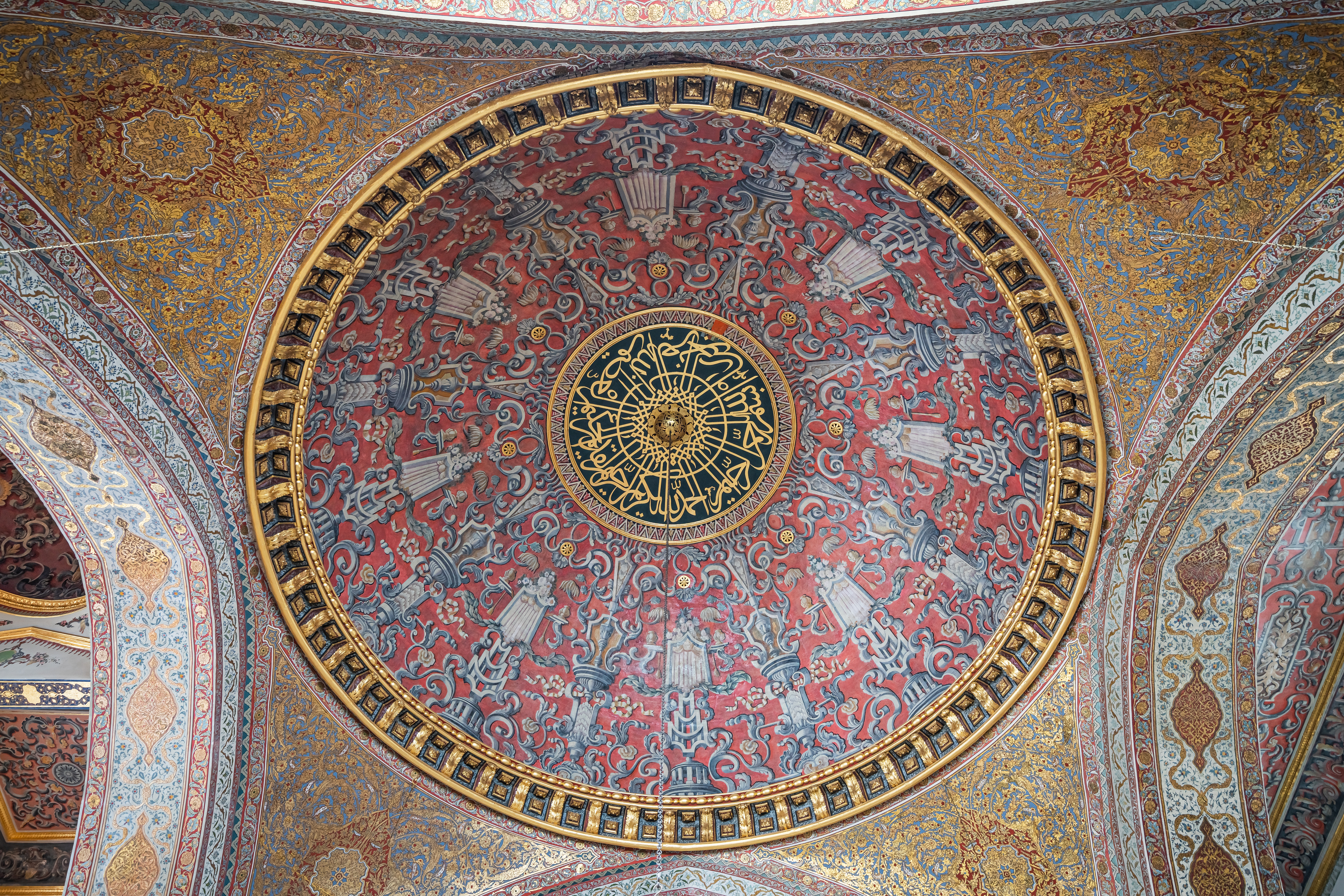
Dome ceiling of the Imperial Hall

The Imperial Hall (Hünkâr Sofası), also known as the Imperial Sofa, Throne Room Within or Hall of Diversions, is a domed hall in the Harem, believed to have been built in the late 16th century. It has the largest dome in the palace. The hall served as the official reception hall of the sultan as well as for the entertainment of the Harem. Here the sultan received his confidants, guests, his mother, his first wife (Hasseki), consorts, and his children. Entertainments, paying of homage during religious festivals, and wedding ceremonies took place here in the presence of the members of the dynasty.

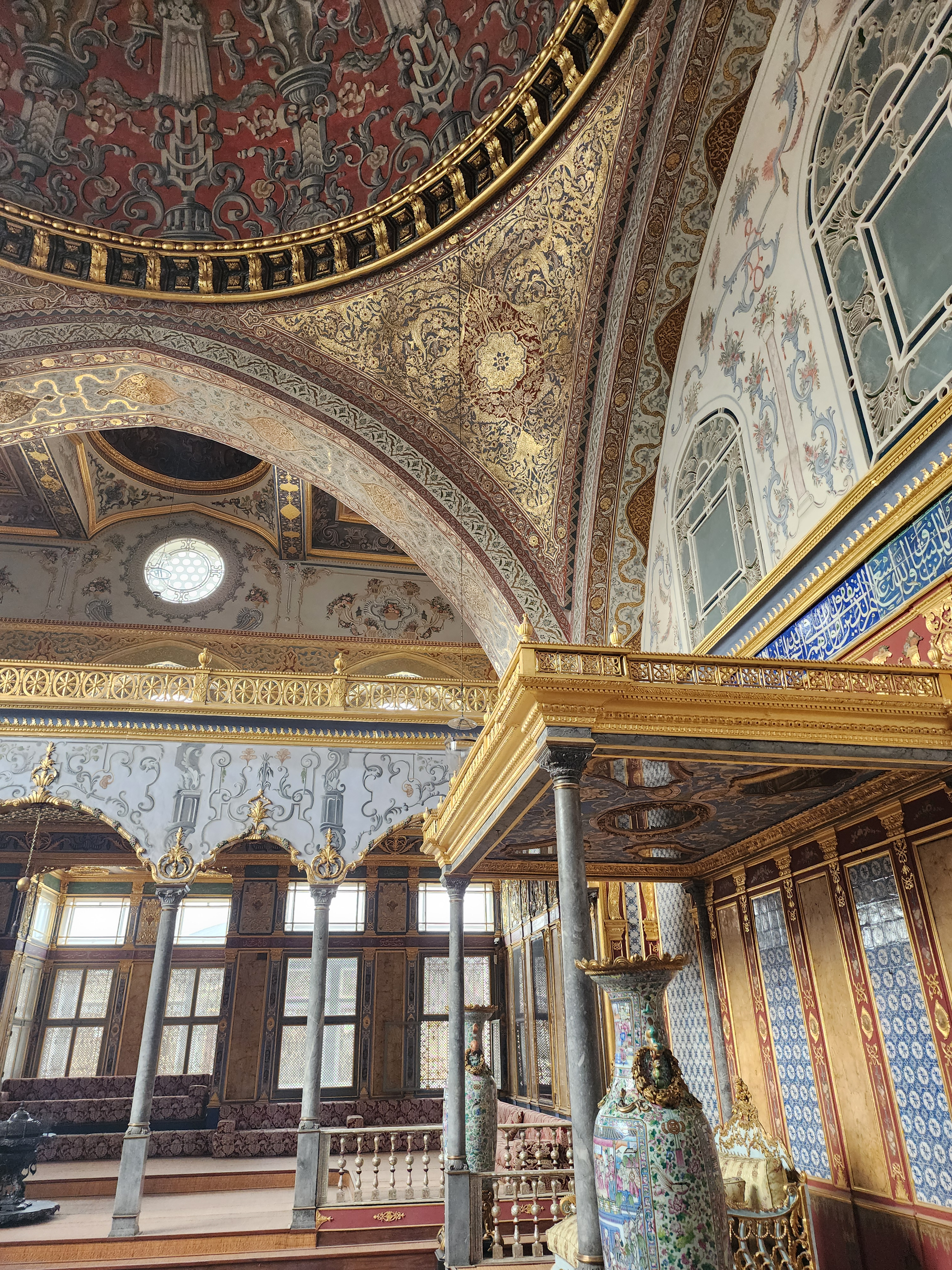
the largest room of the harem, used for the Sultan's entertainment

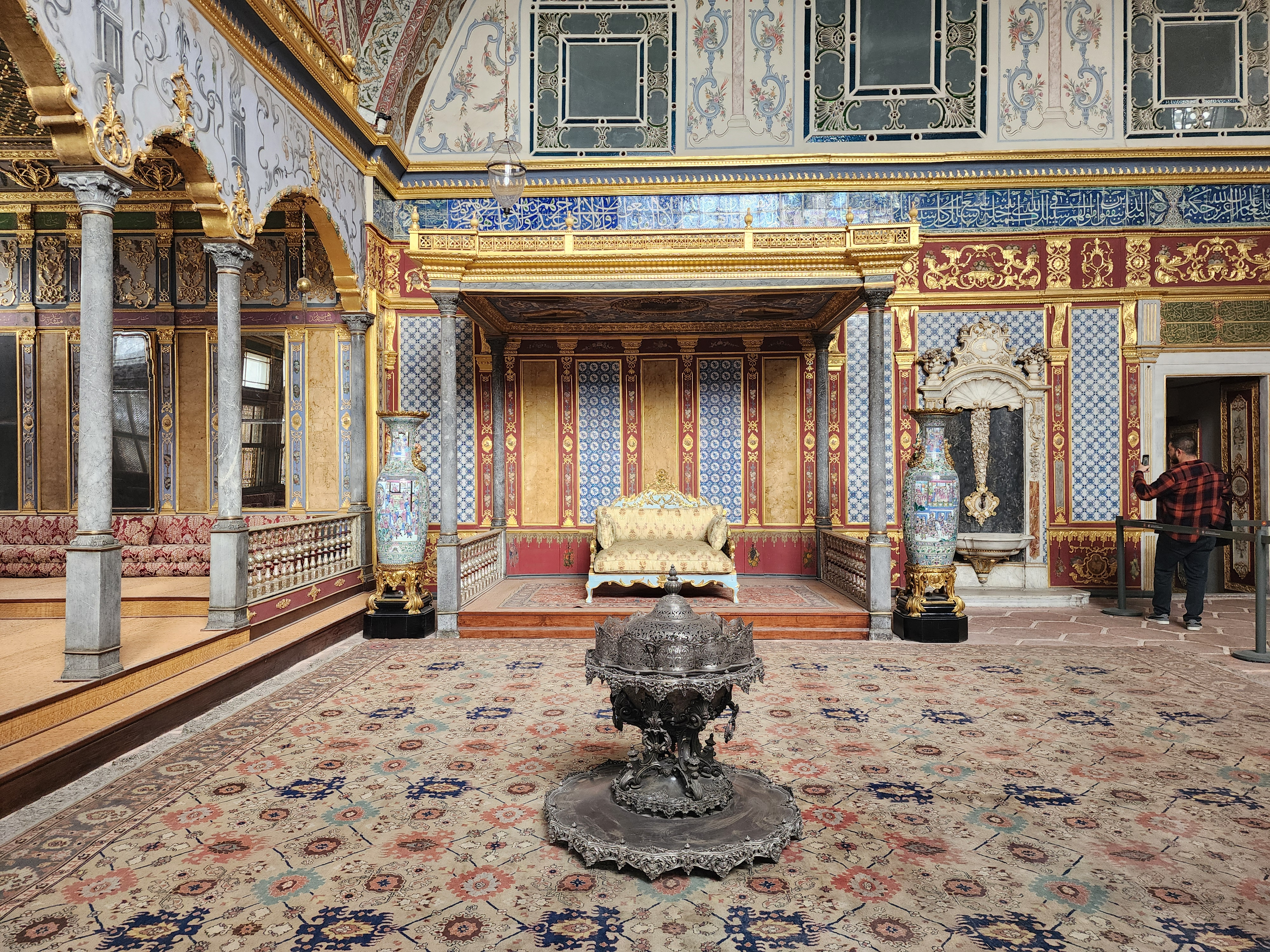
The Imperial Hall, where the Sultan would be entertained

After the Great Harem Fire of 1666, the hall was renovated in the rococo style during the reign of Sultan Osman III. The tile belt surrounding the walls bearing calligraphic inscriptions were revetted with 18th-century blue-and-white Delftware and mirrors of Venetian glass. But the domed arch and pendentives still bear classical paintings dating from the original construction.

In the hall stands the sultan's throne. The gallery was occupied by the consorts of the sultan, headed by the Queen Mother. The gilded chairs are a present of Emperor Wilhelm II of Germany, while the clocks are a gift of Queen Victoria. A pantry, where musical instruments are exhibited, opens to the Imperial Hall, which provides access into the sultan's private apartments.

A secret door behind a mirror allowed the sultan a safe passage. One door admits to the Queen Mother's apartments, another to the sultan's hammam. The opposite doors lead to the small dining chamber (rebuilt by Ahmed III) and the great bedchamber, while the other admits to a series of ante-chambers, including the room with the fountain (Çeşmeli Sofa), which were all retiled and redecorated in the 17th century.

=== Privy Chamber of Murat III ===
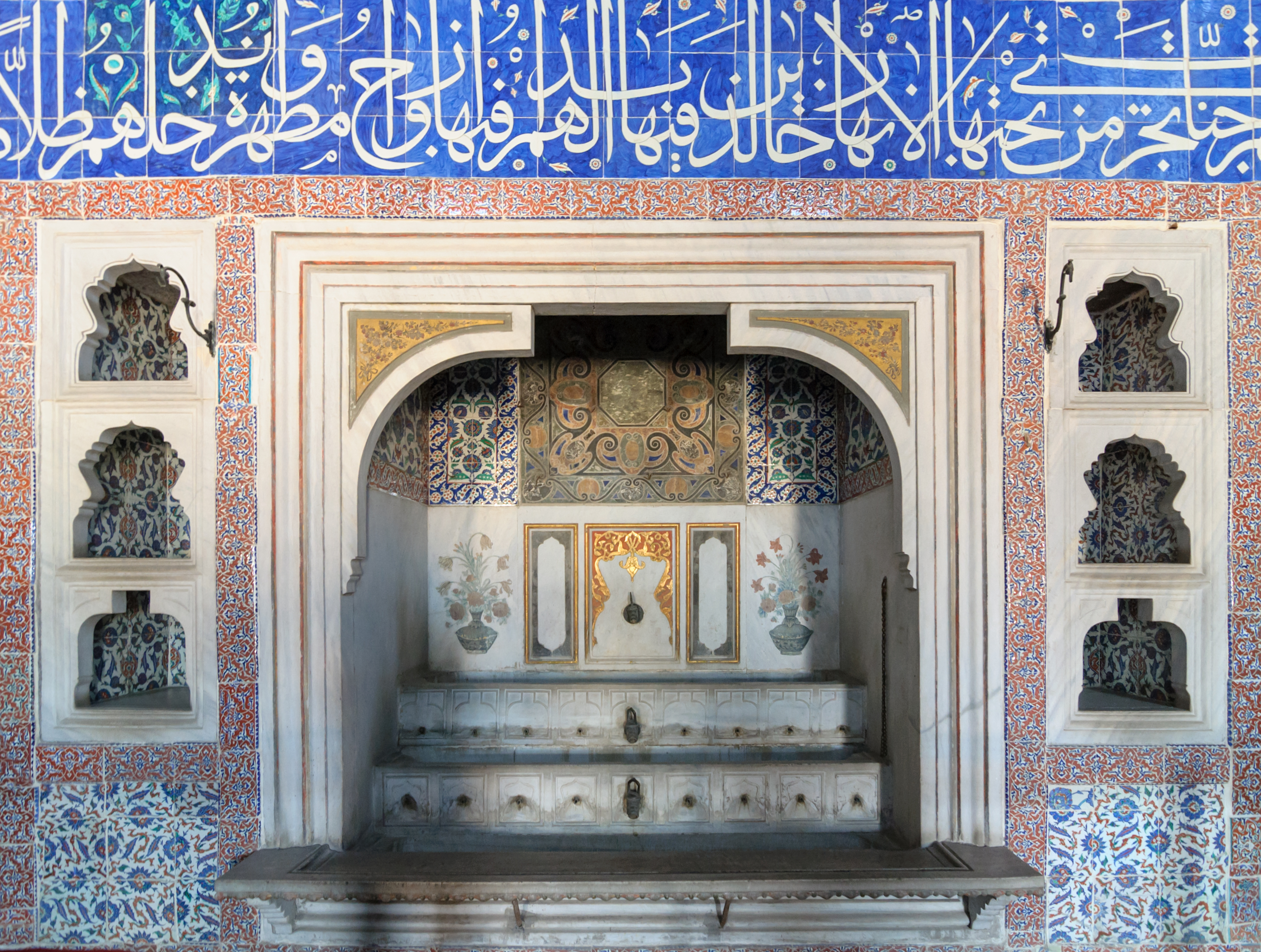
The fountain of the Privy Chamber of Murat III

The Privy Chamber of Murat III (III. Murad Has Odası) is the oldest and finest surviving room in the harem, having retained its original interior. It was a design of the master architect Sinan and dates from the 16th century. Its dome is only slightly smaller than that of the Throne Room. Its hall has one of the finest doors of the palace and leads past the wing of the crown princes (Kafes). The room is decorated with blue-and-white and coral-red İznik tiles. The rich floral designs are framed in thick orange borders of the 1570s. A band of inscriptional tiles runs around the room above the shelf and door level. The large arabesque patterns of the dome have been regilded and repainted in black and red. The large fireplace with gilded hood (ocak) stands opposite a two-tiered fountain (çeşme), skilfully decorated in coloured marble. The flow of water was meant to prevent any eavesdropping, while providing a relaxed atmosphere to the room. The two gilded baldachin beds date from the 18th century.

=== Privy Chamber of Ahmed I ===
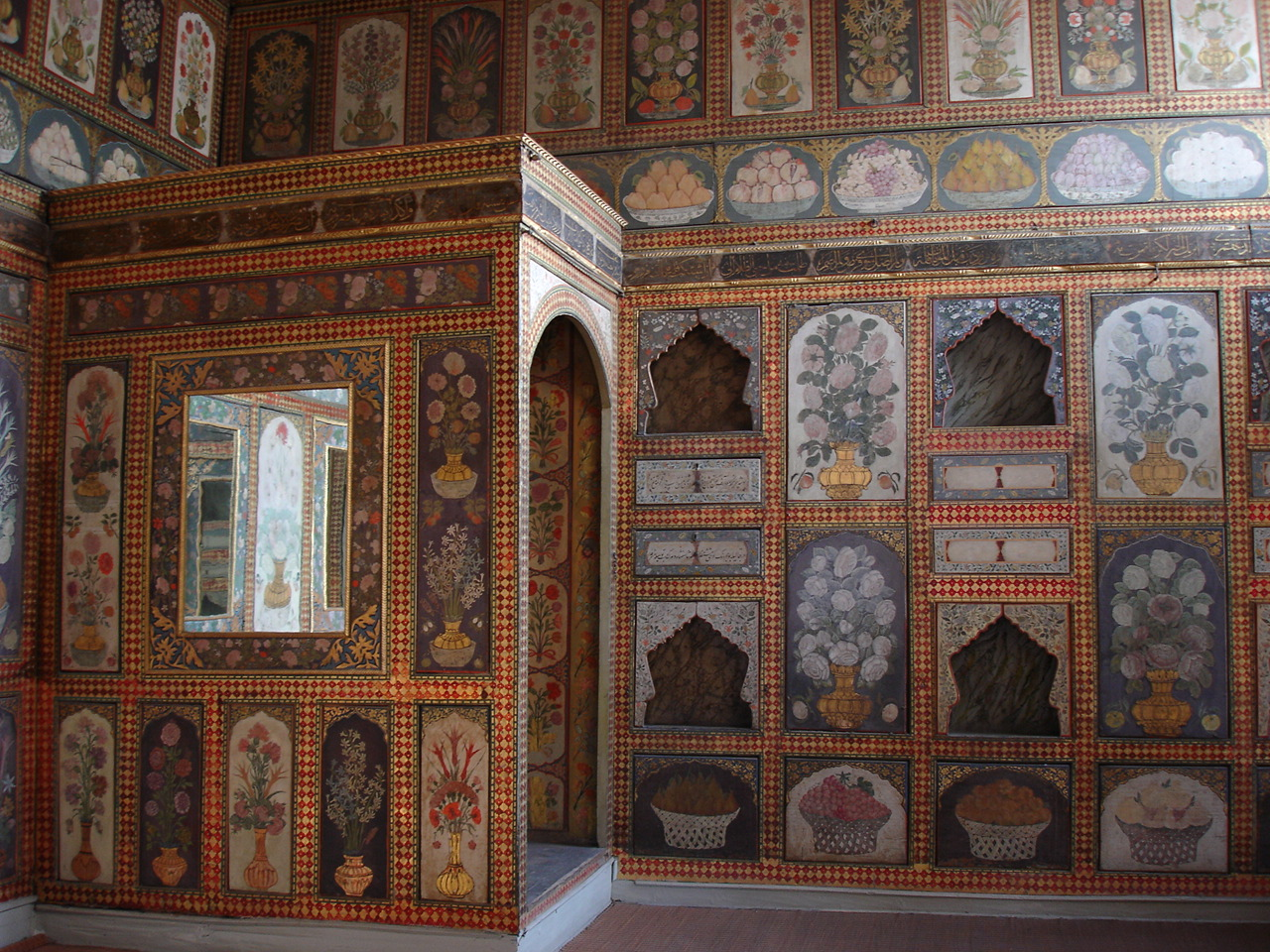
The Fruit Room with painted walls

On the other side of the great bedchamber there are two smaller rooms: first the Privy Chamber of Ahmed I (I. Ahmed Has Odası), richly decorated with İznik glazed tiles. The cabinet doors, the window shutters, a small table and a Qur'an lectern are decorated with nacre and ivory.

=== Privy Chamber of Ahmed III ===
Next to it is the small but very colourful Privy Chamber of Ahmed III (III. Ahmed Has Odası) with walls painted with panels of floral designs and bowls of fruit and with an intricate tiles fireplace (ocak). This room is, therefore, also known as the Fruit Room (Yemis Odası) and was probably used for dining purposes.

=== Twin Kiosk/apartments of the Crown Prince ===
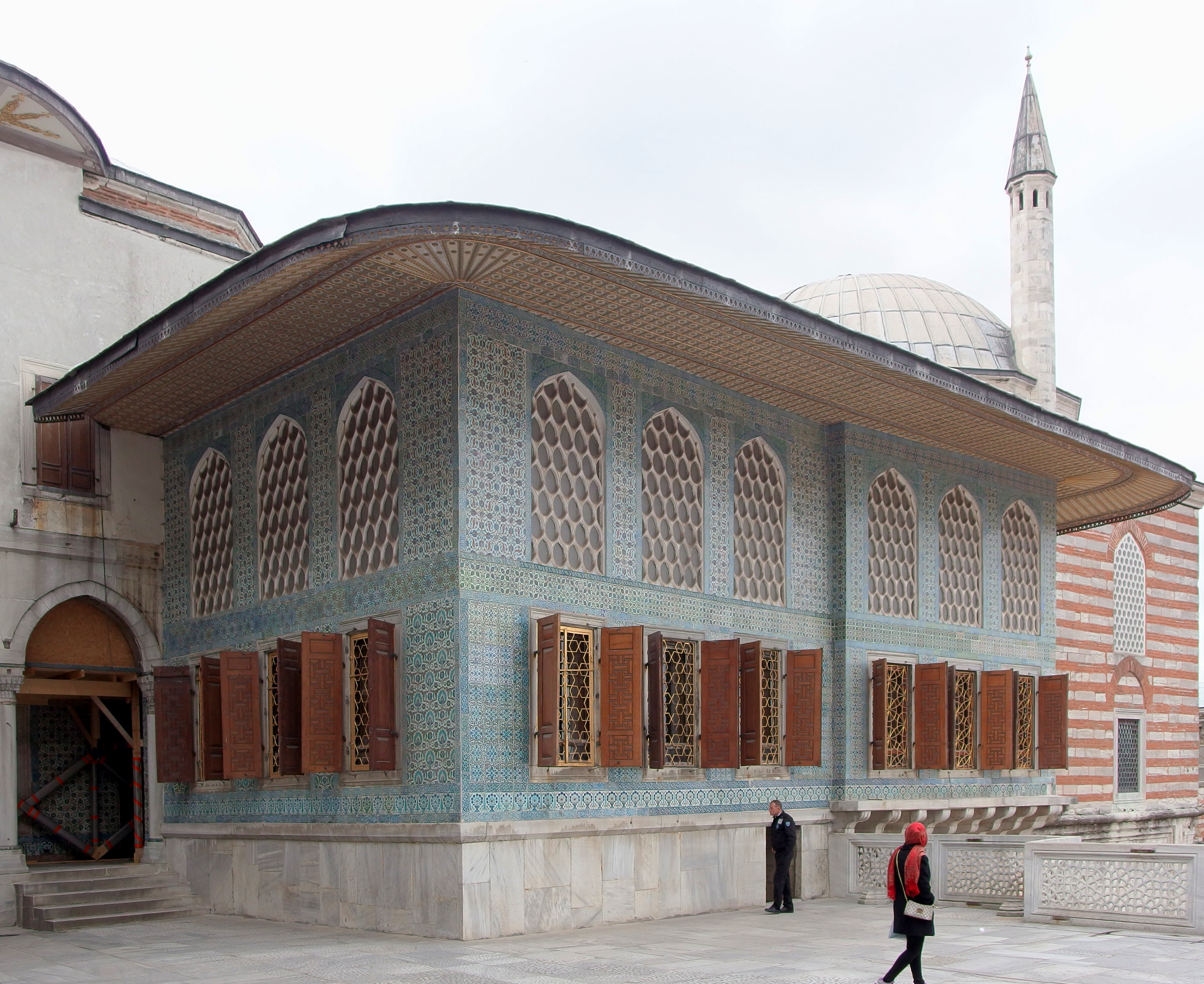
Outside view of the Twin Kiosk

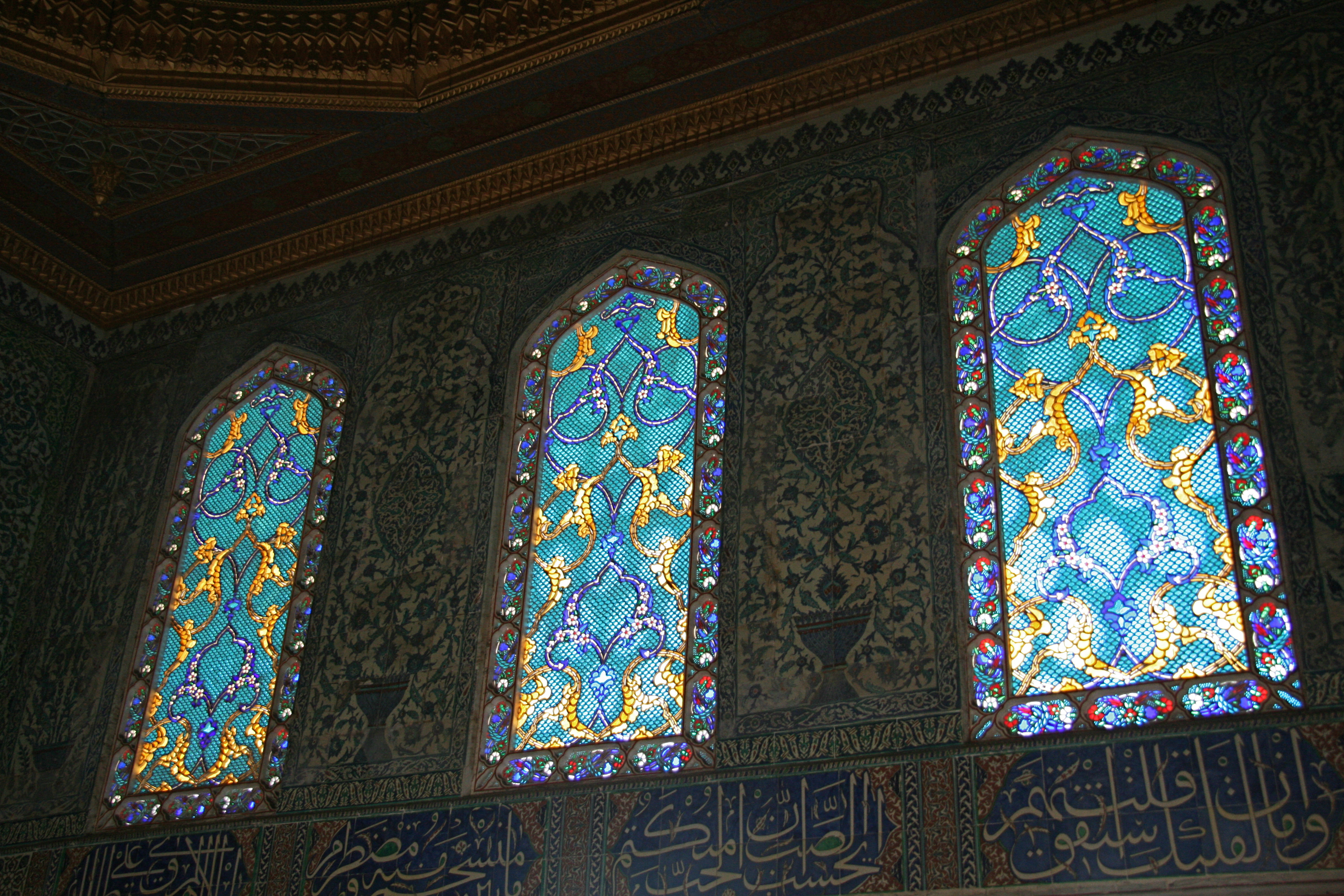
Stained-glass windows decorate the interior

The Twin Kiosk / Apartments of the Crown Prince (Çifte Kasırlar / Veliahd Dairesi) consists of two privy chambers built in the 17th century, at different times. The building is connected to the palace and consists of only one storey built on an elevated platform to give a better view from inside and shield views from the outside.

The interior consists of two large rooms, dating from the reign of Sultan Murat III, but are more probably from the reign of Ahmed I. The ceiling is not flat but conical in the kiosk style, evoking the traditional tents of the early Ottomans. As in tents, there is no standing furniture but sofas set on the carpeted floor on the side of the walls for seating. These chambers represent all the details of the classical style used in other parts of the palace. The pavilion has been completely redecorated, and most of the Baroque woodwork has been removed. The decorative tiles, reflecting the high quality craftsmanship of the İznik tile industry of the 17th century, were removed in accordance with the original concept and replaced with modern copies. The paintwork of the wooden dome is still original and is an example of the rich designs of the late 16th/early 17th centuries. The fireplace in the second room has a tall, gilded hood and has been restored to its original appearance. The window shutters next to the fireplace are decorated with nacre intarsia. The windows in coloured glass look out across the high terrace and the garden of the pool below. The spigots in these windows are surrounded with red, black and gold designs.

The crown prince (Şehzadeler) lived here in seclusion; therefore, the apartments were also called kafes (cage). The crown prince and other princes were trained in the discipline of the Ottoman Harem until they reached adulthood. Afterwards, they were sent as governors to Anatolian provinces, where they were further trained in the administration of state affairs. From the beginning of the 17th century onward, the princes lived in the Harem, which started to have a voice in the palace administration. The Twin Kiosk was used as the privy chamber of the crown prince from the 18th century onward.

=== Courtyard of the Favourites ===
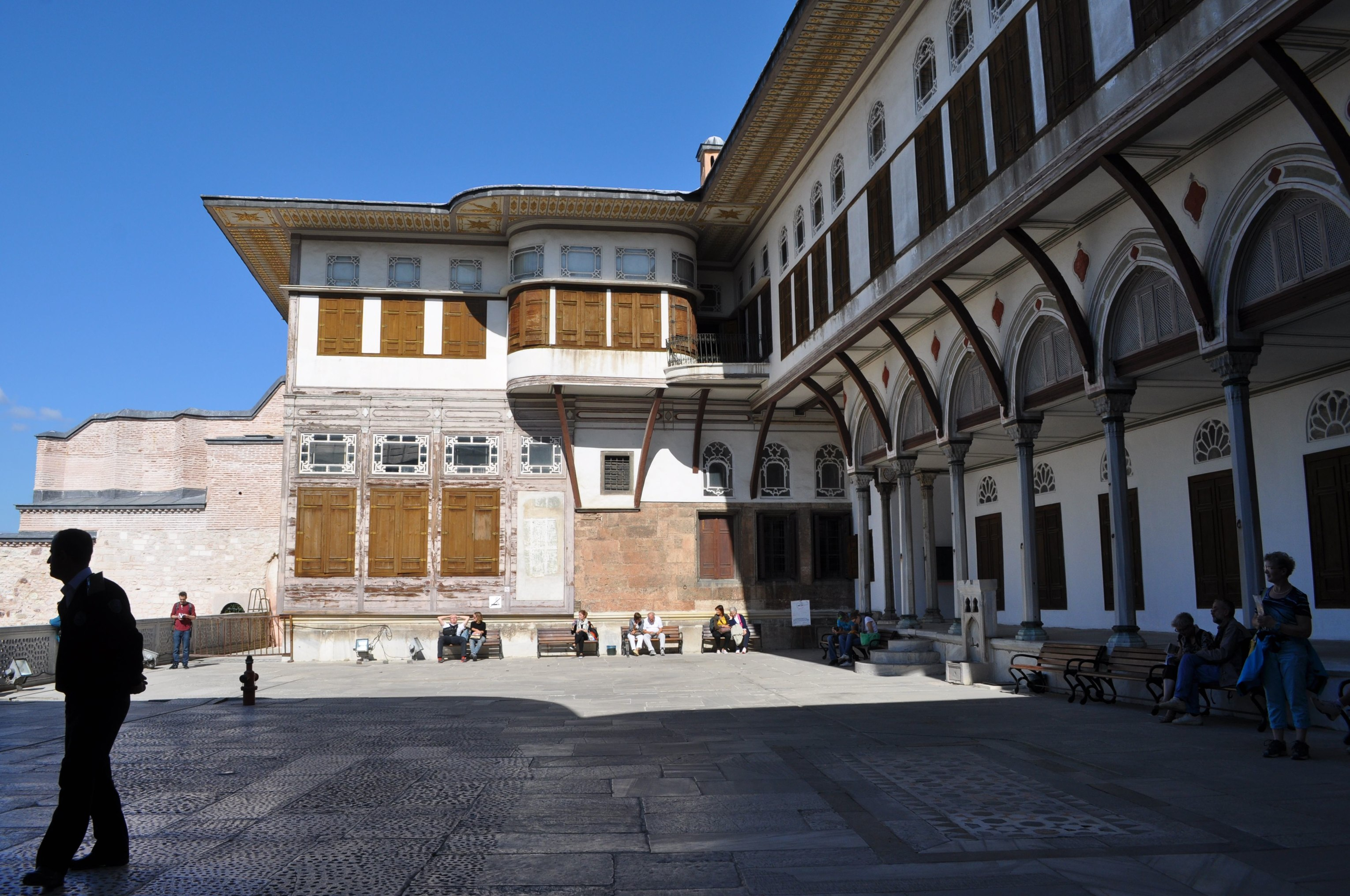
The Courtyard of the Favourites

The Courtyard of the Favourites (Gözdeler / Mabeyn Taşlığı ve Dairesi) forms the last section of the Harem and overlooks a large pool and the Boxwood Garden (Şimşirlik Bahçesi). The courtyard was expanded in the 18th century by the addition of the Interval (Mabeyn) and Favourites (İkballer) apartments. The apartment of the Sultan's Favourite Consort along with the Golden Road (Altın Yol) and the Mabeyn section at the ground floor also included the Hall with the Mirrors. This was the space where Abdül Hamid I lived with his harem. The wooden apartment is decorated in the rococo style.

The favourites of the sultan (Gözdeler / İkballer) were conceived as the instruments of the perpetuation of the dynasty in the harem organisation. When the favourites became pregnant they assumed the title and powers of the official consort (Kadınefendi) of the sultan.

=== Golden Path ===
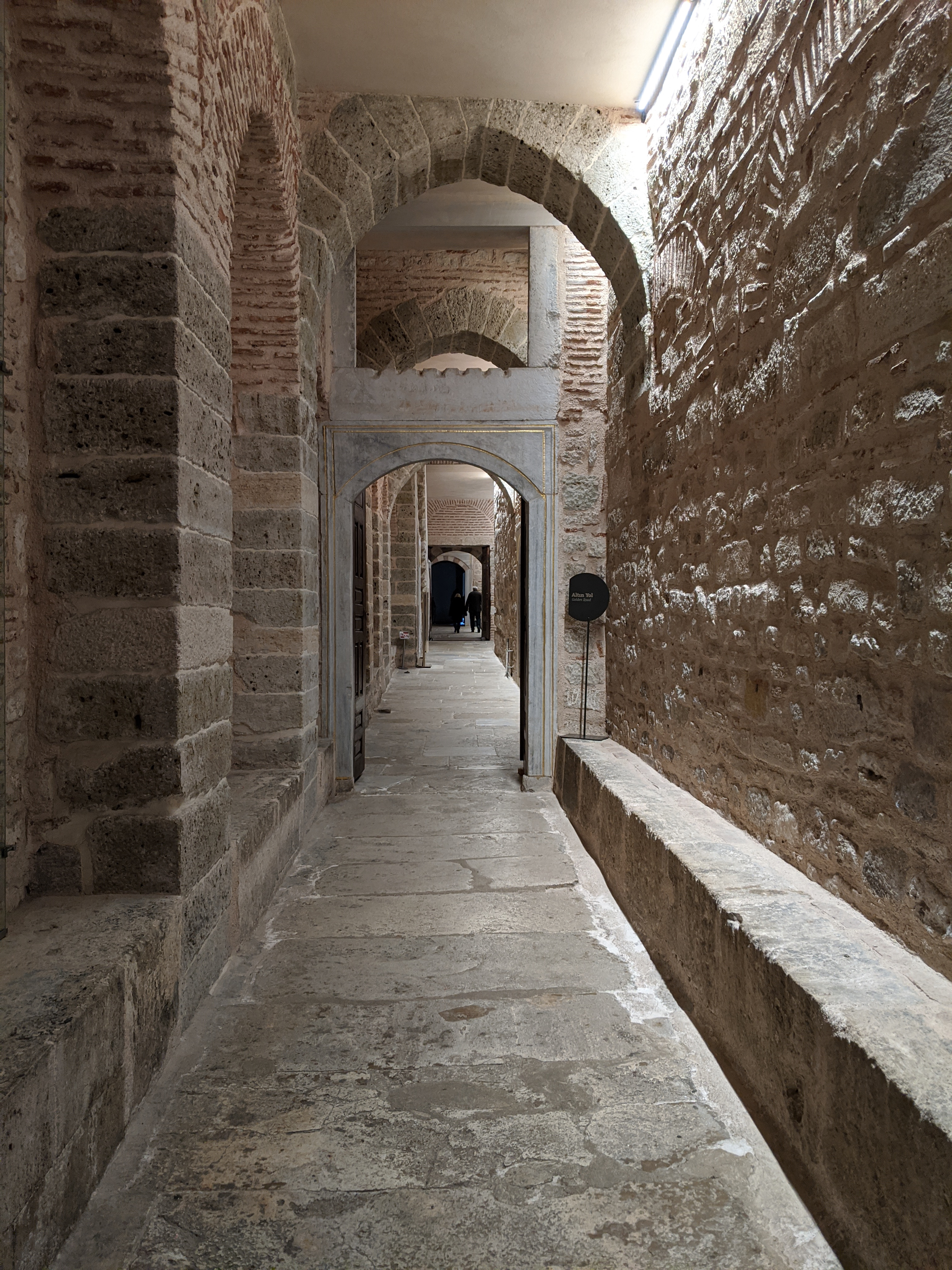
The Golden Path

The Golden Path (Altınyol) is a narrow passage that forms the axis of the Harem, dating from the 15th century. It extends between the Courtyard of the Harem Eunuch (Harem Ağaları Taşlığı) and the Privy Chamber (Has Oda). The sultan used this passage to pass to the Harem, the Privy Chamber and the Sofa-i Hümâyûn, the Imperial terrace. The Courtyard of the Queen Mother (Valide Sultan Taşlığı’), the Courtyard of the Chief Consort of the Sultan (Baş Haseki), the apartments of the Princes (Şehzadegân Daireleri), and the apartments of the Sultan (Hünkâr Dairesi) open to this passage. The walls are painted a plain white colour. It is believed that the attribute "golden" is due to the sultan's throwing of golden coins to be picked up by the concubines at festive days, although this is disputed by some scholars.

=== Aviary / Harem Gate ===
Until the late 19th century, there had been a small inner court in this corner of the Enderûn Courtyard. This court led through the Kuşhane Gate into the harem. Today this is the gate from which the visitors exit from the Harem. Birds were raised for the sultan's table in the buildings around the gate. On the inscription over the Kuşhane door one reads that Mahmud I had the kitchen of the Kuşhane repaired. The balcony of the aviary facing the Harem Gate was constructed during repair work in 1916. The building's facade resembles traditional aviaries.

== Fourth Courtyard ==
The Fourth Courtyard (IV. Avlu), also known as the Imperial Sofa (Sofa-ı Hümâyûn), was more of an innermost private sanctuary of the sultan and his family, and consists of a number of pavilions, kiosks (köşk), gardens and terraces. It was originally a part of the Third Courtyard but recent scholars have identified it as more separate to better distinguish it.

=== Circumcision Room ===
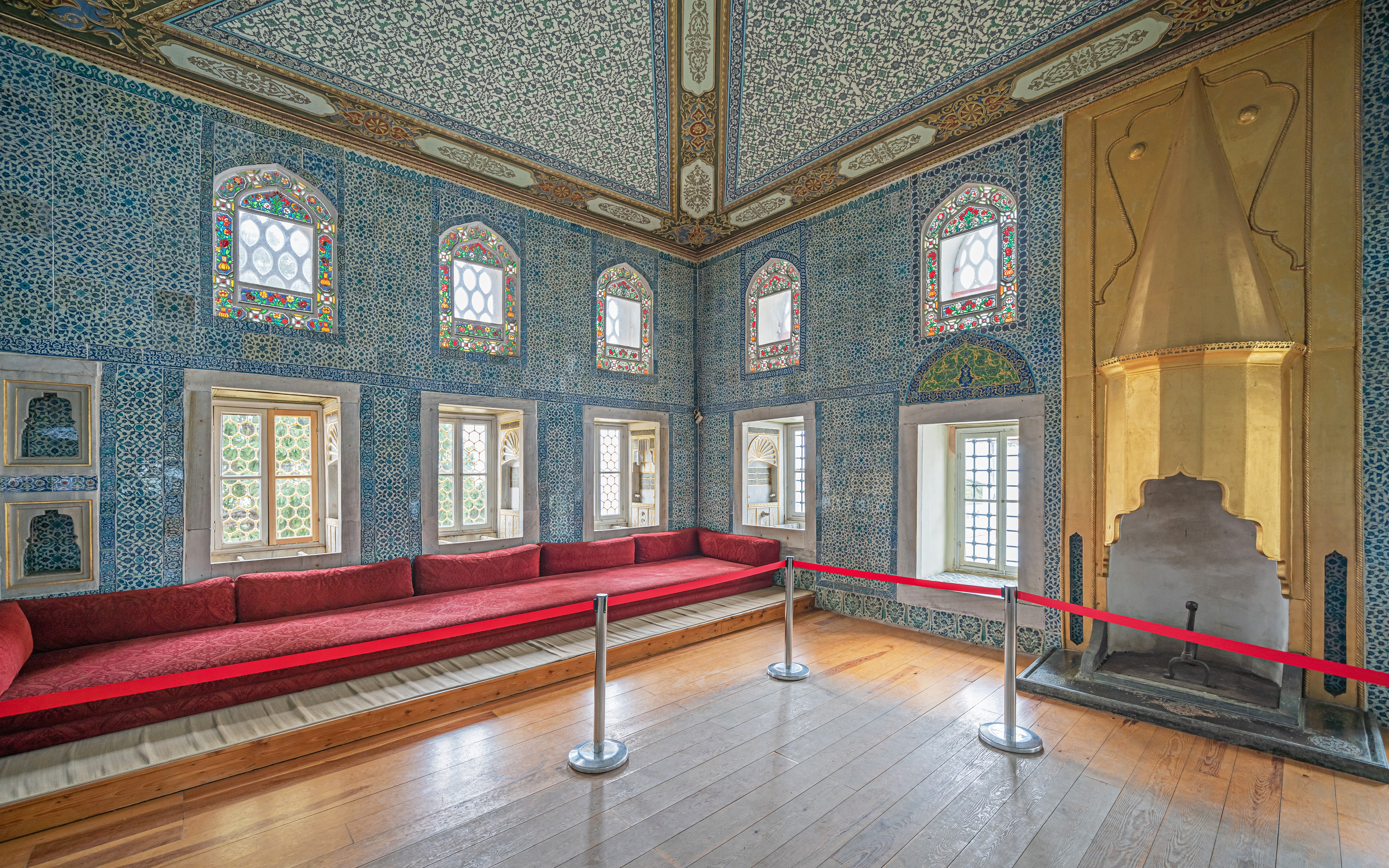
Interior of the Circumcision Room

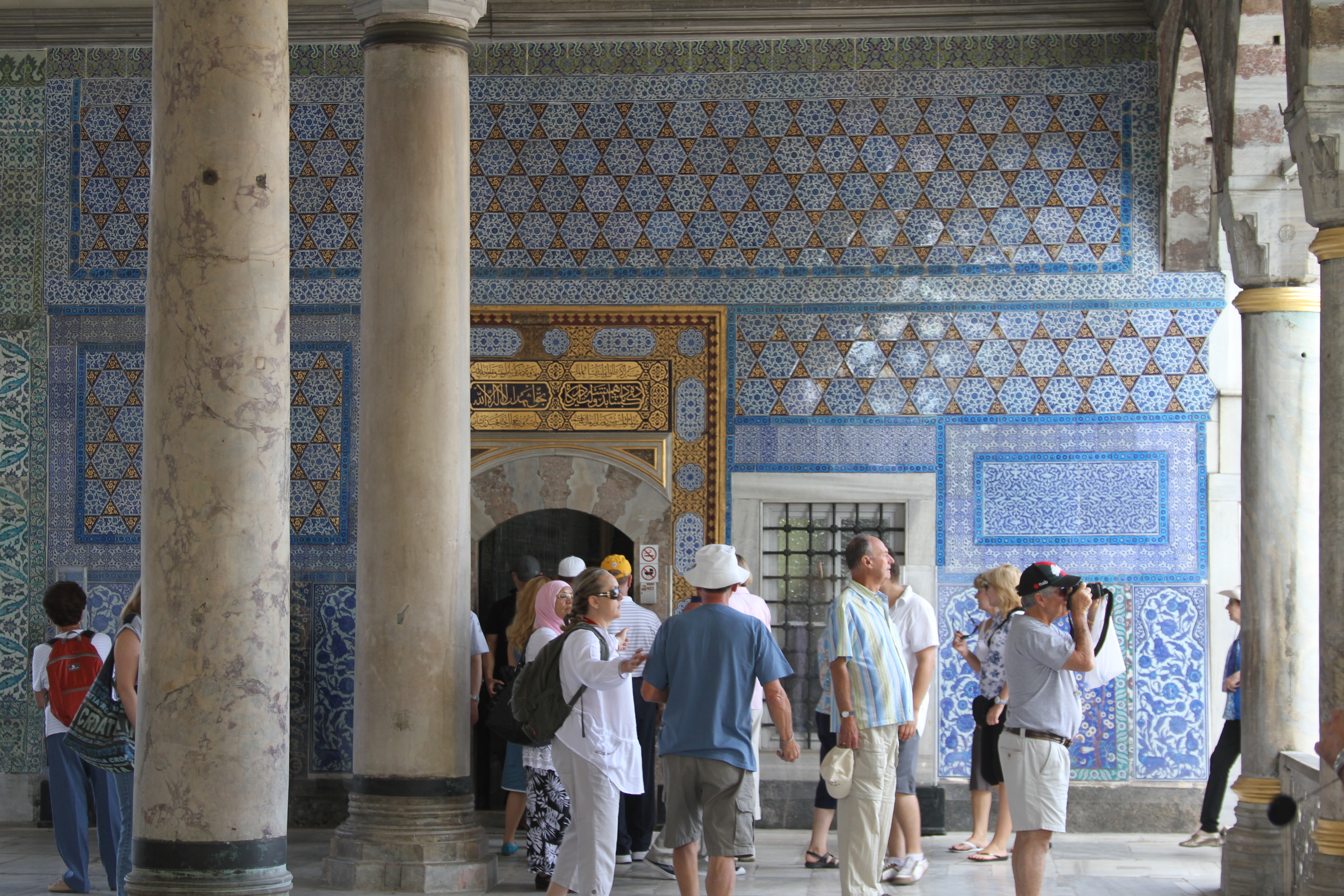
Entrance of the Circumcision Room

In 1640, Sultan Ibrahim I added the Circumcision Room (Sünnet Odası), a summer kiosk (Yazlik Oda) dedicated to the circumcision of young princes, which is a religious tradition in Islam for cleanliness and purity. Its interior and exterior are decorated with a mixed collection of rare recycled tiles such as the blue tiles with flower motifs at the exterior. The most important of these are the blue and white tile panels influenced by far-eastern ceramics on the chamber facade, dated 1529. These once embellished ceremonial buildings of Sultan Suleiman I, such as the building of the Council Hall and the Inner Treasury (both in the Second Courtyard) and the Throne Room (in the Third Courtyard). They were moved here out of nostalgia and reverence for the golden age of his reign. These tiles then served as prototypes for the decoration of the Yerevan and Baghdad kiosks. The room itself is symmetrically proportioned and relatively spacious for the palace, with windows, each with a small fountain. The windows above contain some stained-glass panels. On the right side of the entrance stands a fireplace with a gilded hood. Sultan Ibrahim also built the arcaded roof around the Chamber of the Holy Mantle and the upper terrace between this room and the Baghdad kiosk.

The royal architect Hasan Ağa under Sultan Murat IV constructed during 1635–36 the Yerevan Kiosk (Revan Köşkü) and in 1638–1639 the Baghdad Kiosk (Bağdat Köşkü) to celebrate the Ottoman victories at Yerevan and Baghdad. Both contain most of their original decoration, with projecting eaves, a central dome and interior with recessed cupboards and woodwork with inlaid nacre tesserae. Both are based on the classical four-iwan plan with sofas filling the rectangular bays.

=== Yerevan Kiosk ===
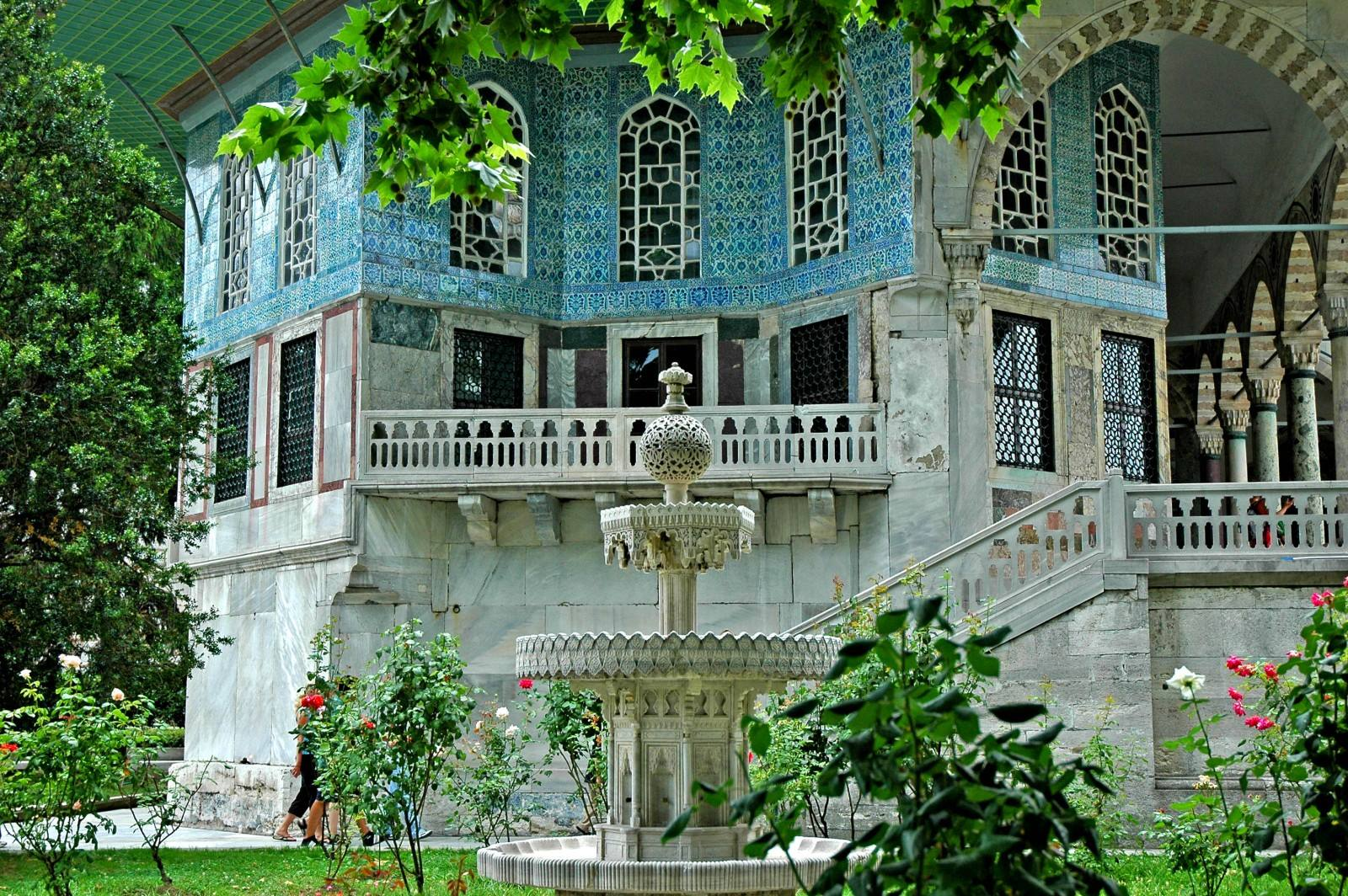
Open recess (iwan) of the Yerevan Kiosk

The Yerevan Kiosk (Revan Köşkü) served as a religious retreat of 40 days. It is a rather small pavilion with a central dome and three apses for sofas and textiles. The fourth wall contains the door and a fireplace. The wall facing the colonnade is set with marble, the other walls with low-cost İznik blue-and-white tiles, patterned after those of a century earlier.

=== Baghdad Kiosk ===
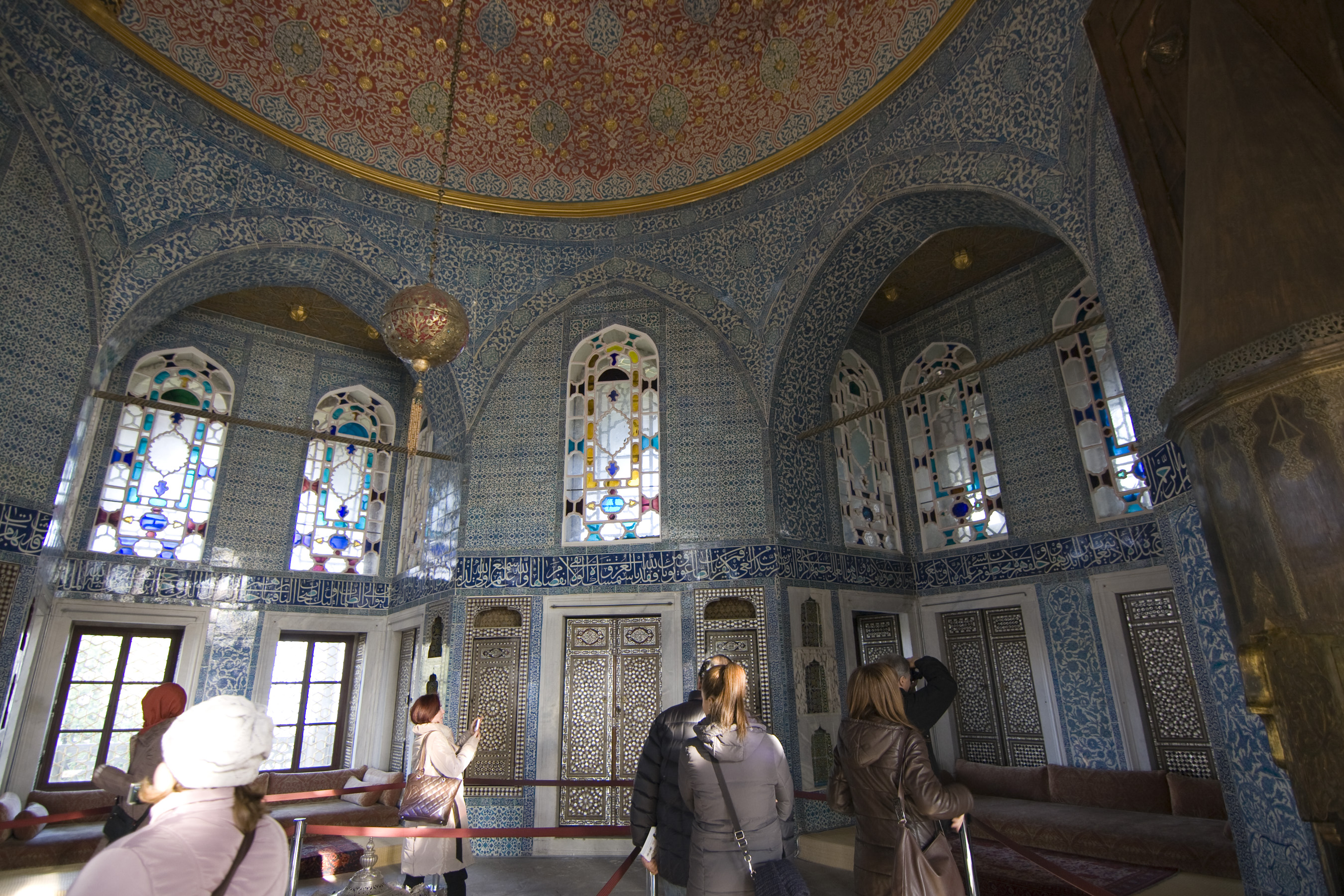
Interior of Baghdad Kiosk

The Baghdad Kiosk (Bağdat Köşkü) is situated on the right side of the terrace with a fountain. It was built to commemorate the Baghdad Campaign of Murad IV after 1638.

It closely resembles the Yerevan Kiosk. The three doors to the porch are located between the sofas. The façade is covered with marble, strips of porphyry and verd antique. The marble panelling of the portico is executed in Cairene Mamluk style. The interior is an example of an ideal Ottoman room. The recessed shelves and cupboards are decorated with early 16th-century green, yellow and blue tiles. The blue-and-white tiles on the walls are copies of the tiles of the Circumcision Room, right across the terrace. With its tiles dating to the 17th century, mother-of-pearl, tortoise-shell decorated cupboard and window panels, this pavilion is one of the last examples of the classical palace architecture.

The doors have very fine inlay work. On the right side of the entrance is a fireplace with a gilded hood. In the middle of the room is a silver 'mangal' (charcoal stove), a present of King Louis XIV of France. From the mid-18th century onwards, the building was used as the library of the Privy Chamber.

=== İftar Kiosk ===
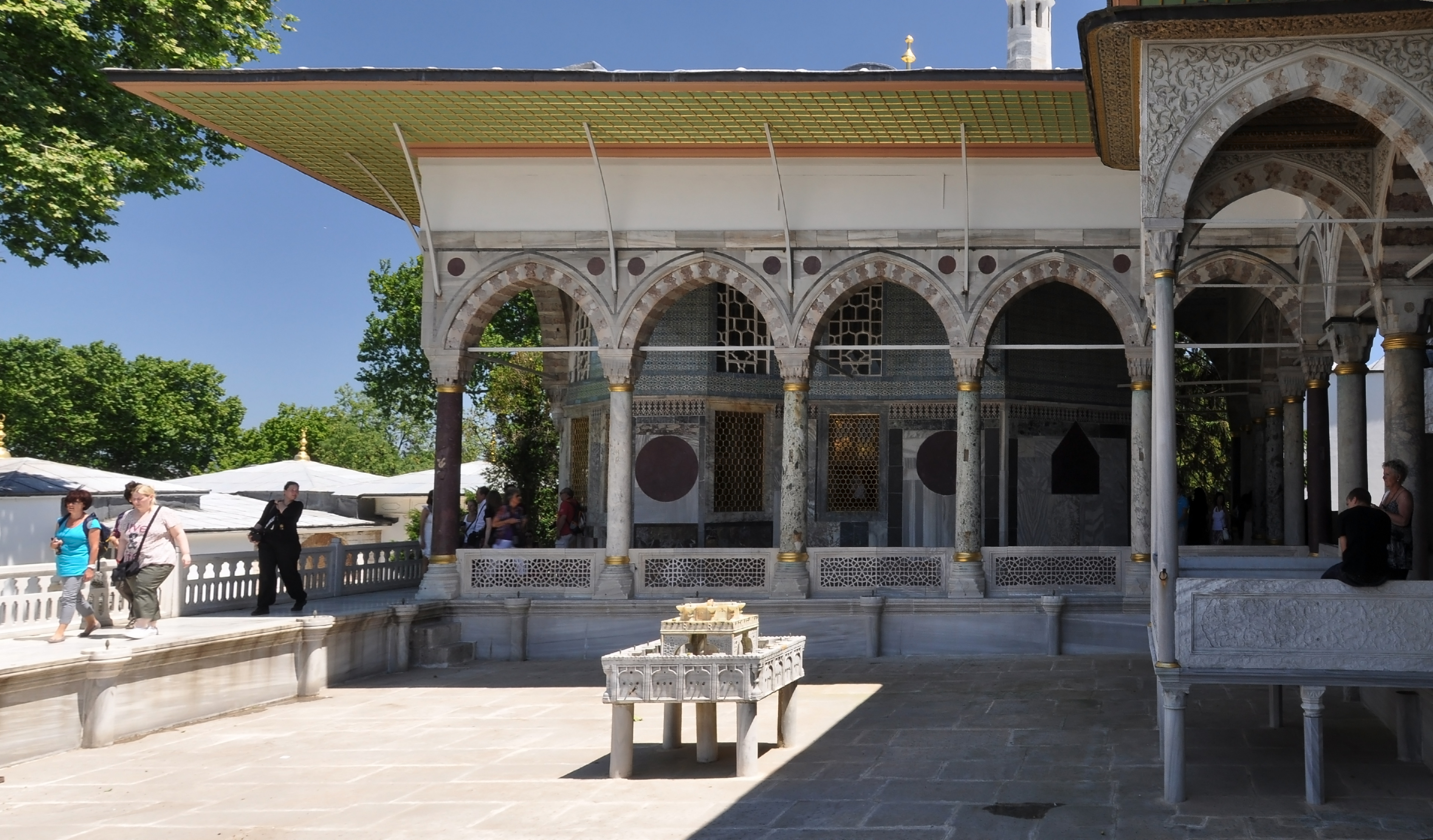
Upper terrace with fountain, İftar bower and Baghdad Kiosk

The gilded İftar Pavilion, also known as İftar Kiosk or İftar bower (İftariye Köşkü or İftariye Kameriyesi) offers a view on the Golden Horn and is a magnet for tourists today for photo opportunities. Its ridged cradle vault with the gilded roof was a first in Ottoman architecture with echoes of China and India. The sultan is reported to have had the custom to break his fast (iftar) under this bower during the fasting month of ramadan after sunset. Some sources mention this resting place as the "Moonlit Seat". Special gifts like the showering of gold coins to officials by the sultan also sometimes occurred here. The marbled terrace gained its current appearance during the reign of Sultan Ibrahim (1640–1648).

=== Terrace Kiosk ===
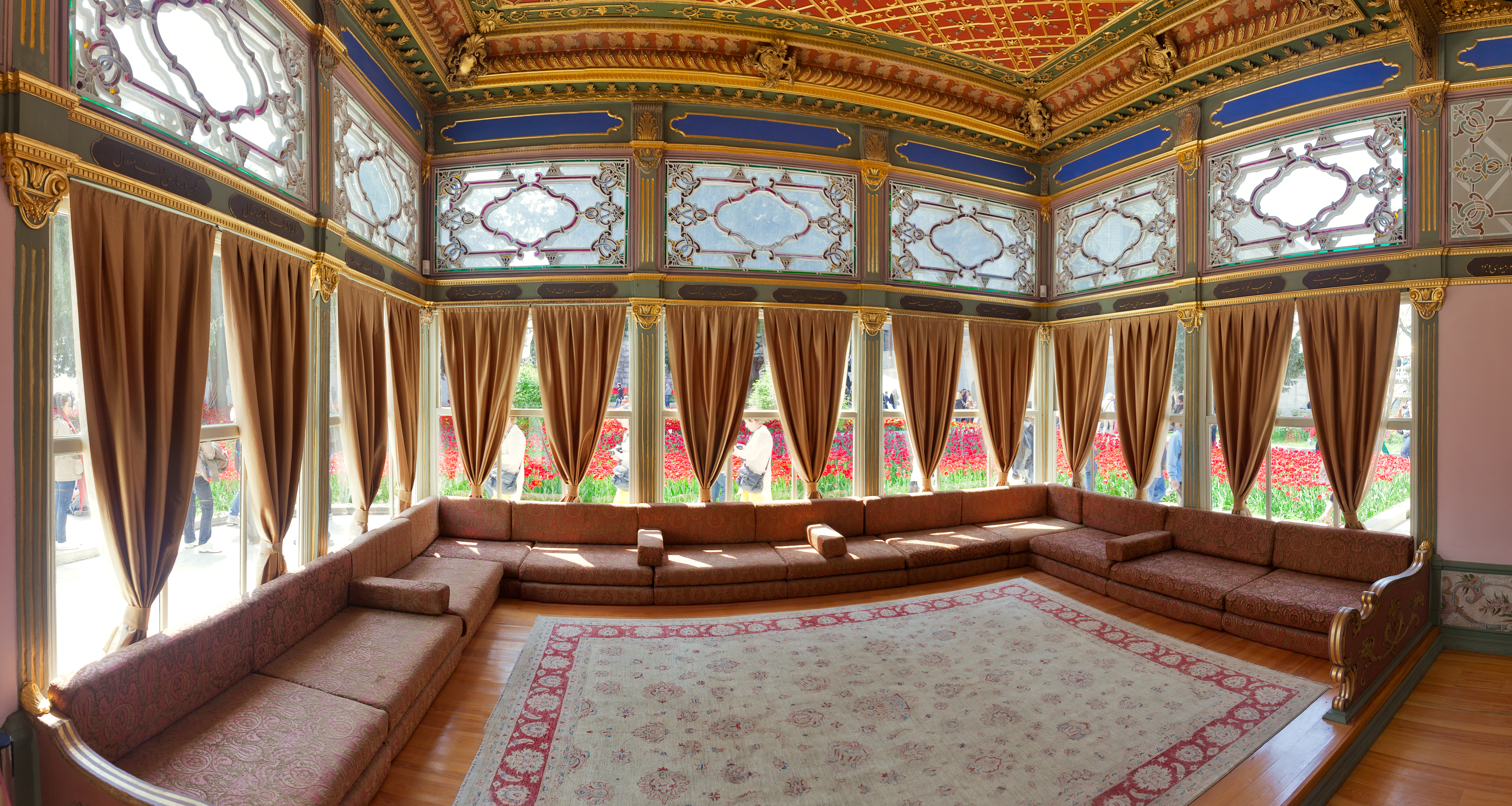
Interior of the Terrace Kiosk

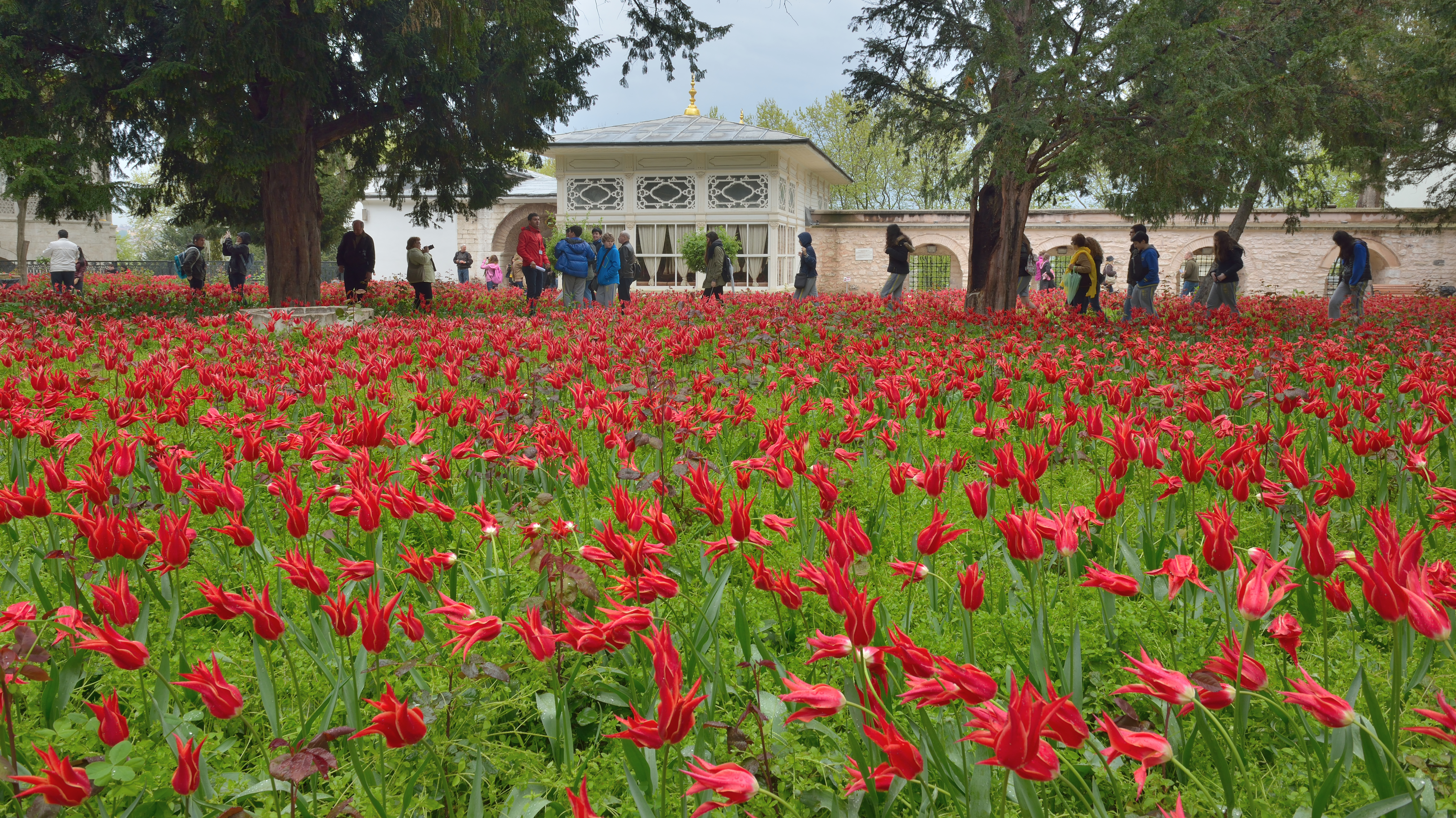
Tulip Garden and Terrace Kiosk

The rectilinear Terrace Kiosk (Sofa Köşku / Merdiven Başı Kasrı), also erroneously known as Kiosk of Kara Mustafa Pasha (Mustafa Paşa Köşkü), was a belvedere built in the second half of the 16th century. It was restored in 1704 by Sultan Ahmed III and rebuilt in 1752 by Mahmud I in the Rococo style. It is the only wooden building in the innermost part of the palace. It consists of rooms with the backside supported by columns.

The kiosk consists of the main hall called Divanhane, the prayer room (Namaz Odası) and the Room for Sweet Fruit Beverages (Şerbet Odası). From the kiosk, the sultan would watch sporting events in the garden and other organised entertainment. This open building with large windows was originally used as a restroom and later, during the Tulip era (1718–1730), as a lodge for guests. It is situated next to the Tulip Garden.

=== Tower of the Head Tutor / Chamber of the Chief Physician ===
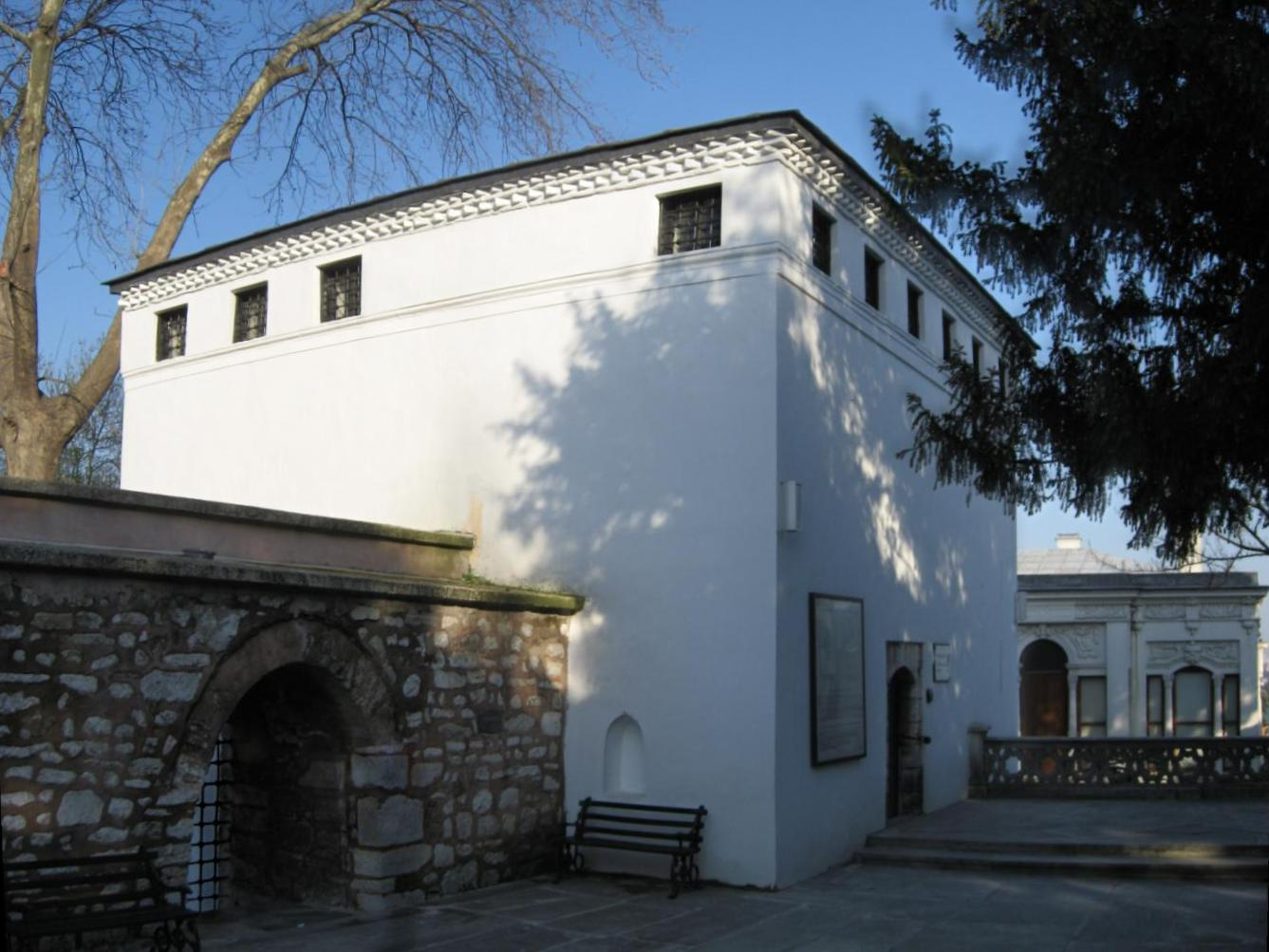
Tower of the Head Tutor / Chamber of the Chief Physician

The square Tower of the Head Tutor (Başlala Kulesi), also known as the Chamber of the Chief Physician and court drugstore (Hekimbaşı Odası ve ilk eczane), dates from the 15th century and is the oldest building in the Fourth Courtyard. It was built as a watch tower, probably during the time of Mehmed II. It has few windows, and its walls are almost two metres thick. The physician had his private chamber at the top, while below was a store for drugs and medicine.

The first court pharmacy was established during the reign of Mehmed II. There were also other pharmacies and infirmaries at the palace besides this particular one. According to a legend, Enderunlu Tayyar Efendi, who was the Chief Tutor (Baş Lala) during the reign of Sultan Selim III, saw from the upper floor of this tower the rebels coming to the palace to assassinate the sultan and alarmed the sultan's loyalists. The historian Afa writes that the tower was more than two floors higher than today, but today it only has two storeys left.

The Chief Physician (Hekim Başı) and the Chief Tutor shared this place as their residence. The Chief Physician was responsible for the health of the sultan and the imperial family and used to prepare the medicines here. Under his supervision and those of the chief tutor, the palace drugs were prepared, mixed, and sealed in bottles, jars, boxes, or bowls and given to the patients.

The Chief Physician was also a companion of the sultan outside the palace, accompanying him even on battles. The office of the chief physician was traditionally held by Jews. After the 17th century, there were increasingly Muslim physicians along with Jewish and European physicians. The last Chief Physician was Abdülhak Molla, who lived during the reign of Sultan Abdülmecid I. After the sultan moved away from Topkapı, the tower was used as a music conservatory and later used for the cleaning of palace arms. It was restored in 1911 and houses the medical objects collection.

=== Stone throne ===
A stone throne (Taş Taht) was made for Murad IV to watch the sports activities of pages. The inscription on the throne states that in 1636, Murad IV, who was an accomplished sportsman himself, threw an oak cudgel 120 meters.

=== Grand Kiosk ===
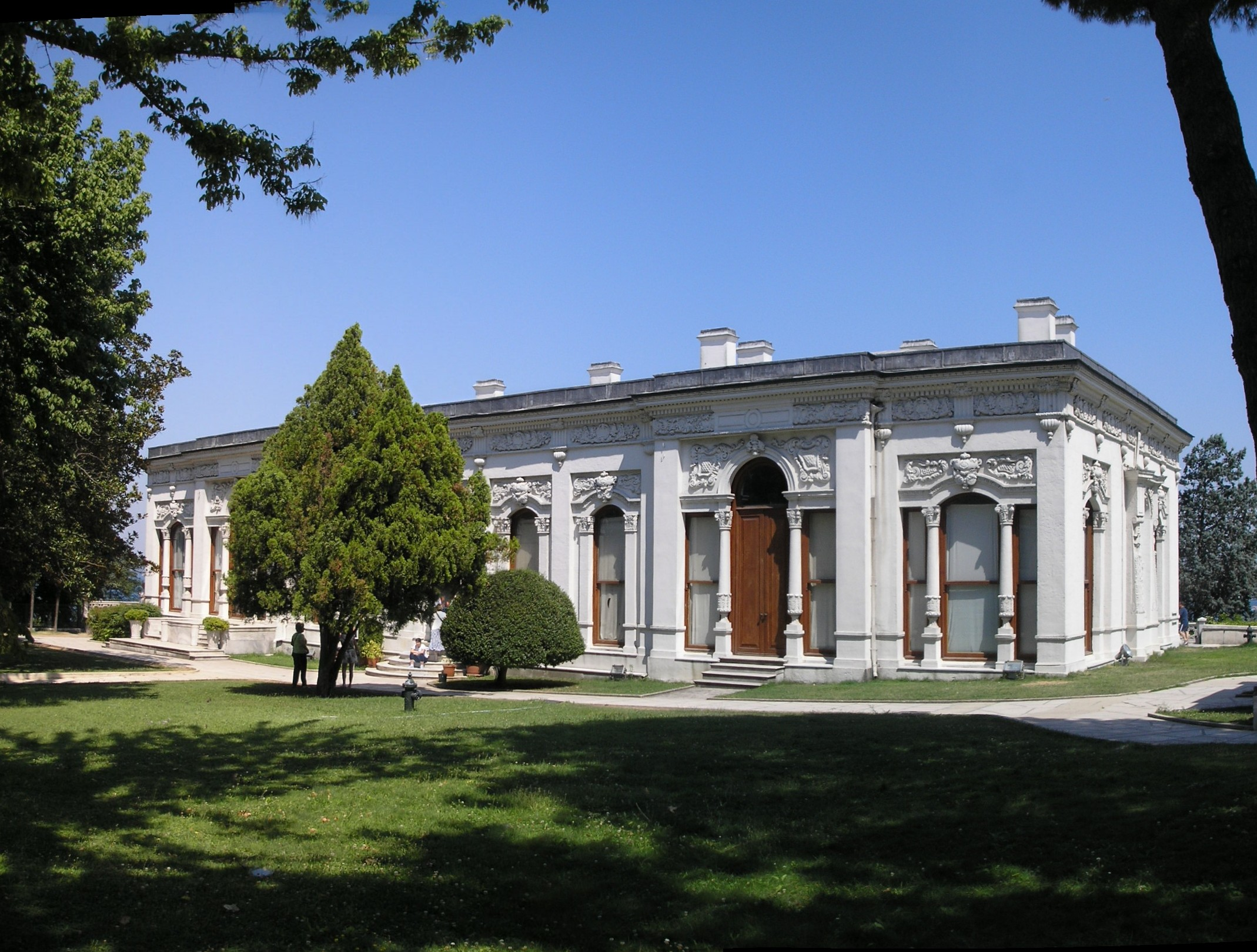
Grand Kiosk

The Grand Kiosk, also known as the Mecidiye Kiosk, Grand Pavilion or Kiosk of Abdül Mecid I (Mecidiye Köşkü), built in 1840, was the last significant addition to the palace, along with the neighbouring Wardrobe Chamber (Esvap Odası). Both were built on the orders of Sultan Abdül Mecid I as an imperial reception and resting place because of its splendid location, giving a panoramic view on the Sea of Marmara and the Bosphorus. The sultans would stay here whenever they visited Topkapı from their seaside palaces. These constructions were erected on the vaulted basement of another kiosk dating from the 15th century. The architect Sarkis Balyan constructed it in an eclectic Europeanized style, mixed with traditional Ottoman style. Inside it is furnished in the Empire style. The two buildings were also used occasionally to accommodate foreign guests.

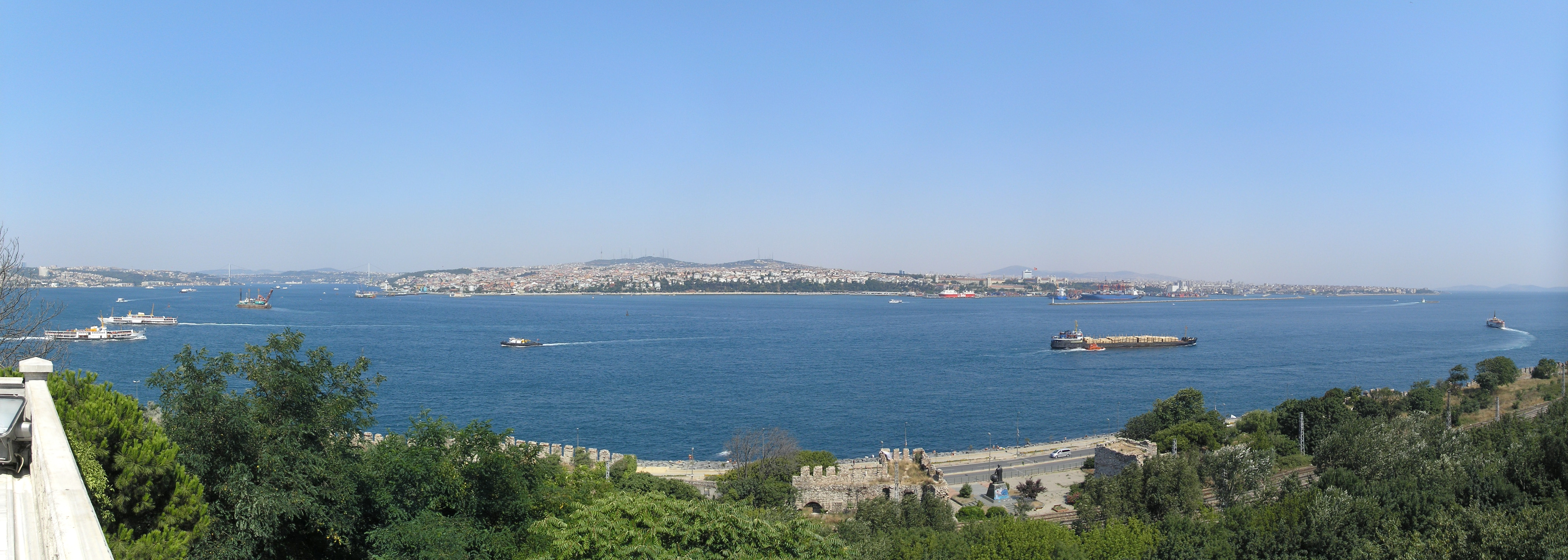
Panoramic view of the Marmara Sea from the palace

Located next to the Grand Kiosk is a high-end restaurant which has been visited by guests such as Queen Elizabeth II, First Lady Jackie Kennedy, President Richard Nixon, and boxer Muhammad Ali.

=== Terrace Mosque ===
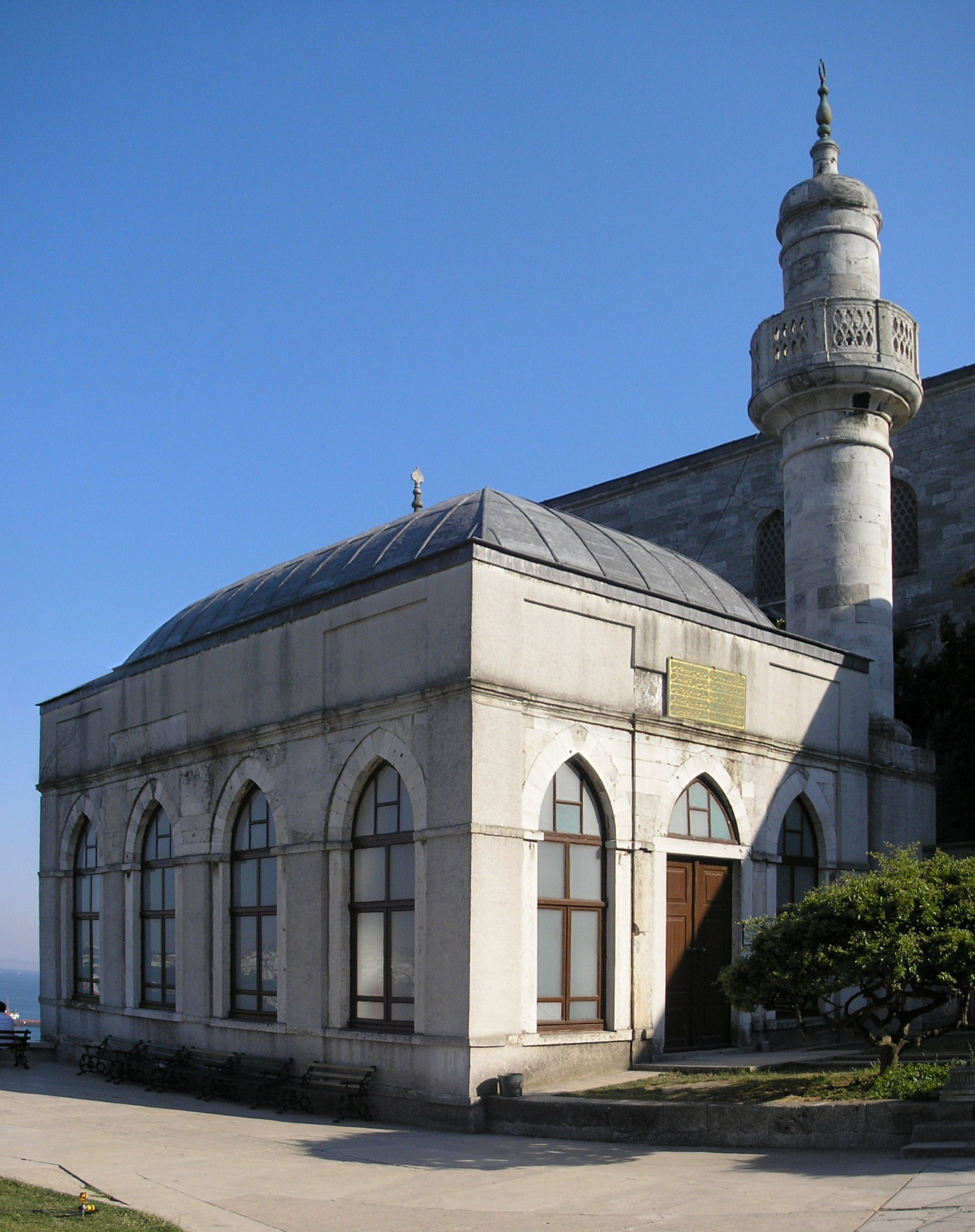
Terrace Mosque

The Terrace Mosque, also called Sofa Mosque (Sofa Camii), was constructed under Mahmud II in the Empire style for the use of the corps called Sofa Ocaği in the 19th century. The Kiosk of the Swordbearer (Silahdar Köşkü) used to stand in its place. The inscription at the gate of the mosque indicated that it was restored under Sultan Abdülmecid I in 1858.

== Outer gardens ==
Surrounding the whole complex of the First to the Fourth Courtyard are the outer palace gardens. A part of this area that is facing the sea is also known as the Fifth Palace.

Mehmed II also had three pavilions, or kiosks, constructed, of which only the Tiled Kiosk (Çinili Köşkü) has survived. The Tiled Pavilion dates to around 1473 and houses the Islamic ceramics collection of the Istanbul Archaeology Museums.

Along the shore a number of pavilions were constructed for the sultan's viewing pleasure. These included the Shore Kiosk, Pearl Kiosk, Marble Kiosk and the Basketmakers' Kiosk. Most of the pavilions along with some of the seaside walls and gates were destroyed when the railway lines leading to the Sirkeci railway station were constructed in the late 19th century. The Basketmakers' Kiosk however was saved.

Located next to the First Courtyard towards the city lies the Gülhane Park, the old imperial rose garden, which belonged to the larger complex of the palace. This park is open to the public. Located at the gate to the park is the Procession Kiosk.

== Trees ==
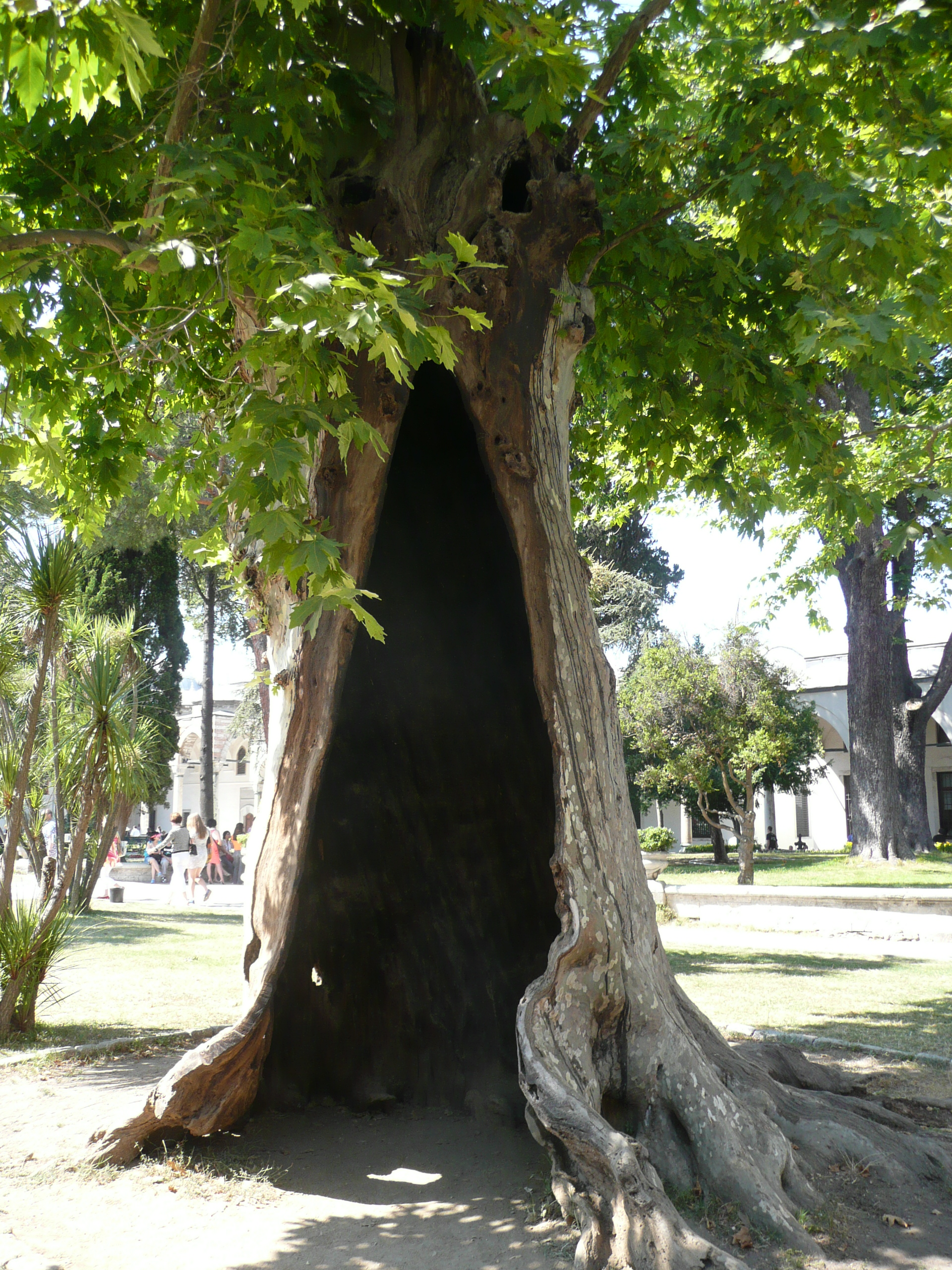
One of the hollow trees, in the Third Court

The trees in the Topkapı Palace complex are remarkable, as many have fallen victim to a fungus that has completely hollowed out their trunks, over the course of centuries. The trees nonetheless survive and remain standing. In other cases, two trees of a different kind have grown and fused together, such as a fig tree that grew in the hollow of another tree and effectively grafted with it. This phenomenon can be seen in the second courtyard.

== Security concerns ==
The palace has been deemed lax on security and preservation by some experts, who point out that the palace has no climate-controlled rooms or storage and is a "security nightmare".

Since many of the walls of the palace are 3 metres thick, it mostly escaped structural damage during the 1999 İzmit earthquake. Following this catastrophe, the museum director placed the porcelain collection on more secure mounts in the palace.

During a 1999 robbery, thieves stole portions of a 12th-century Qur'an from a locked exhibit in the library.

On 30 November 2011, Libyan ex-police and revolutionary Samir Salem Ali Elmadhavri, apparently copying the act of Norwegian extremist Anders Behring Breivik, attempted to massacre hundreds of tourists visiting the palace in the early hours. Stopped at the Bab-i Humayun entrance by the Palace Guards, he opened fire on soldiers and security guards, injuring Private Şerafettin Eray Topçu and security guard Mehmet Ballıcı. Then he entered the main courtyard of the palace, but was forced to retreat and seek shelter in the entrance upon encountering Palace Guard forces. After a gunfight lasting over one hour, he was killed by Turkish Police.

== Copies ==
The resort hotel World Of Wonders Resorts & Hotels Topkapı Palace in Antalya is a reconstruction of some of the buildings, such as the Audience Chamber, the palace kitchens and the Tower of Justice.

== See also ==
- Dolmabahçe Palace – imperial residence from 1853 until 1889, and from 1909 until 1922
- Yıldız Palace – imperial residence from 1889 until 1909
- Ottoman architecture
- State organisation of the Ottoman Empire
- Military of the Ottoman Empire

== Literature ==
- G., Goodwin (2003). A History of Ottoman Architecture. London: Thames & Hudson Ltd. ISBN 0-500-27429-0.
- Turhan Can, Topkapi Palace, Orient Turistik Yayinlar Ve Hizmetler Ltd., Istanbul, 1994;
- Turner, J. (ed.) - Grove Dictionary of Art - Oxford University Press, USA; New edition (January 2, 1996); ISBN 0-19-517068-7
- Ertug, Ahmet. Topkapi : The Palace of Felicity. Istanbul: Ertug and Koluk. pp. 244 pages.
- İpşiroğlu, Mazhar Şevket (1980). Masterpieces from the Topkapı Museum : paintings and miniatures. London: Thames and Hudson. pp. 150 pages. ISBN 0-500-23323-3.
- Goodwin, Godfrey (2000). Topkapi Palace: An Illustrated Guide to its Life and Personalities. Saqi Books. ISBN 0-86356-067-9.
- Topkapi Palace Museum. The Imperial Treasury. MAS Publications. 2001. ISBN 975-7710-04-0
- Necipoğlu, Gülru (1991). Architecture, ceremonial, and power: The Topkapi Palace in the fifteenth and sixteenth centuries. Cambridge, Massachusetts: The MIT Press. pp. 336 pages. ISBN 0-262-14050-0.
- Misugi, Takatoshi (1981). Chinese porcelain collections in the Near East: Topkapi and Ardebil. Hong Kong: Hong Kong University Press. pp. 273 pages. ISBN 962-209-004-4.
- Ahmet Ertuğ. Topkapi: The Palace of Felicity. Ertug & Kokabiyik. 1989. ASIN B0006F4CM6
- Tahsin Oz. Topkapi Saray Museum 50 Masterpieces. Turkish Press. ASIN B000VHIQCG
- J. M. Rogers. The Topkapi Saray Museum. Architecture; the Harem and other buildings. New York Graphic Society. 1988. ASIN B000MKDDF2
- Hulya Tezcan, J. M. Rogers. The Topkapi Saray Museum: Textiles. Bulfinch Press. 1986. ISBN 978-0-8212-1634-7
- J. M. Rogers (Author), Cengiz Koseoglu. Topkapi Saray Museum. Bulfinch Press. 1988. ISBN 978-0-8212-1672-9
- Rogers, J.M. (1987). The Topkapı Saray Museum: Carpets. Boston: Little, Brown & Company. pp. 248 pages. ISBN 0-8212-1679-1.
- Filiz Pcafgman (Author), J. M. Rogers. The Topkapi Saray Museum: Manuscripts. Bulfinch Press. 1986. ISBN 978-0-8212-1633-0
- Regina Krahl (Author), Nurdan Erbahar (Author), John Ayers (Author). Chinese Ceramics in Topkapi Saray Museum, Istanbul: A Complete Catalogue. Sotheby Parke Bernet Publications. 1986. ISBN 978-0-85667-184-5
- Zeynep M. Durukan. The Harem of the Topkapi Palace. Hilal Matbaacilik Koll. 1973. ASIN B000OLCZPI
- Esin Atil. Suleymanname: The Illustrated History of Suleyman the Magnificent. Harry N Abrams. 1986. ISBN 978-0-8109-1505-3
- Fanny Davis. Palace of Topkapi in Istanbul. 1970. ASIN B000NP64Z2
- Turhan Can. Topkapi Palace. Orient Touristic Publishing Service. 1997. ASIN B000JERAEQ
- Claire, Karaz (2004). Topkapi Palace Inside and Out: A Guide to the Topkapi Palace Museum and Grounds. Istanbul: Çitlembik Publications. pp. 104 pages. ISBN 978-975-6663-49-3.
- Sabahattin Turkoglu. The Topkapi Palace. NET. 1989. ISBN 978-975-479-074-0
- Ilhan Aksit. Topkapi Palace. Istanbul. 1994. ASIN B000MPGBGK
- Ergun, Nilgün, and Özge İskender. 2003. Gardens of the Topkapi Palace: An example of Turkish garden art. Studies in the History of Gardens & Designed Landscapes, vol.23, no.i: 57–71.
- Ilber Ortaylı. Topkapi Palace. Tughra Books. Somerset, New Jersey (2008). ISBN 978-1-59784-141-2
- İlhan Akşit. The Mystery of the Ottoman Harem. Akşit Kültür Turizm Yayınları. ISBN 975-7039-26-8
