= Palace Basilica =

Ruined basilica in Istanbul, Turkey

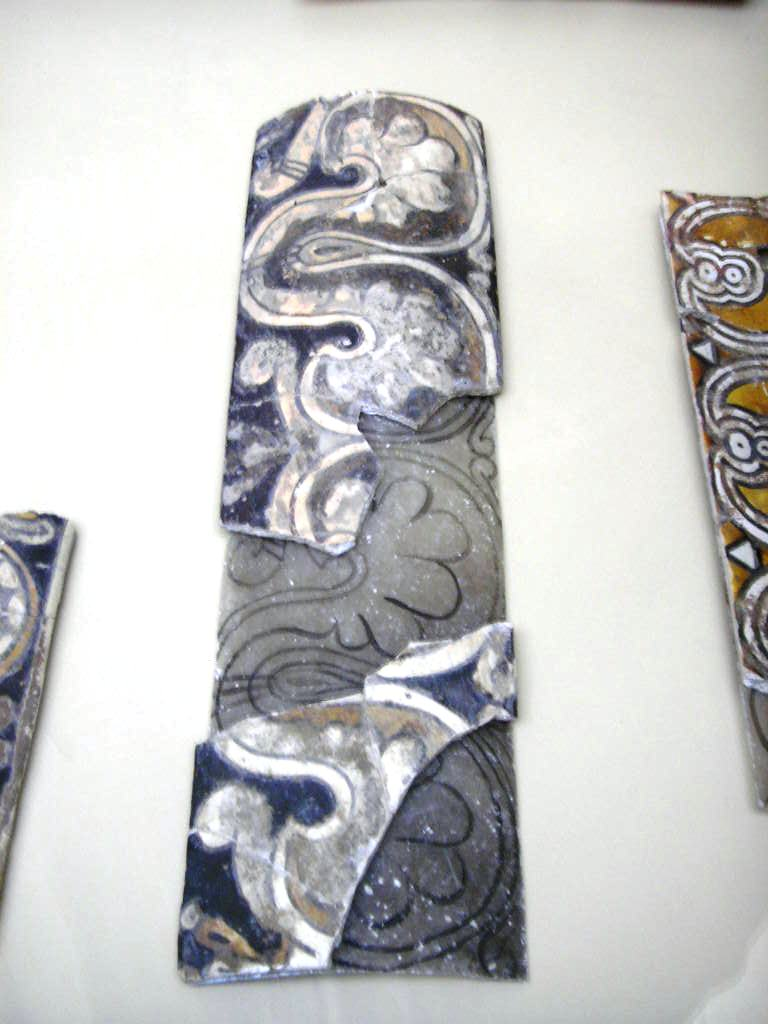
Fragments found at the site of the Palace Basilica

Ground plan of the Palace Basilica

The Palace Basilica is a ruined basilica in the Second Courtyard of Topkapı Palace in Istanbul, Turkey.

The remains were excavated in 1937. Since the name of the church cannot be found, the remains have been named after the location of Topkapı Palace. The basilica was probably constructed around the 5th century AD, and it underwent repairs between the 10th and 12th century.

The church with three naves measured 35 by 21 metres. The external facade of the apse is three-sided: the inner facade is semicircular. The entrance to the atrium is on the north side.
