= Mohammad Mo'men Khan Shamlu =

Turkmen Grand Vizier of Safavid Empire

Grand vizier of Safavid Iran
- In office May 1699 – 1707
- Monarch: Soltan Hoseyn
- Preceded by: Mohammad Taher Vahid Qazvini
- Succeeded by: Shahqoli Khan Zanganeh

Personal details
- Relations: Mohammad Zaman Khan Shamlu (brother)
- Children: Mohammad Qoli Khan Shamlu

Mohammad Mo'men Khan Shamlu (Persian: محمدمؤمن خان شاملو) was the grand vizier of Soltan Hoseyn (r. 1694–1722) from May 1699 to 1707.

== Biography ==
Mohammad Mo'men was a member of the Shamlu tribe. Before his appointment as grand vizier, he had served as the eshik-aqasi-bashi (royal chamberlain). In May 1699, he was appointed grand vizier by Soltan Hoseyn (r. 1694–1722). He thus succeeded Mohammad Taher Vahid Qazvini, who had been dismissed due to his advanced age, despite Mohammad Mo'men Khan also being the same.

During this period, the mostawfi-ye khasseh (manager of the finances of the crown) Mirza Rabia Jaberi emerged as a powerful opponent to Mohammad Mo'men Khan. In contemporary Dutch records, Mohammad Mo'men Khan was described as "not malevolent but greatly fond of gifts," and Mirza Rabia as "extraordinarily smart, full of self-confidence and eager to expose the flaws of other officials to the monarch".

Mirza Rabia constantly challenged Muhammad Mo'men Khan. He benefited from unrestricted access to Soltan Hoseyn, who seemingly felt some animosity toward Mohammad Mo'men Khan. This standing allowed Mirza Rabia to summon "all the cans, viziers, beglerbegs to come themselves and make up their accompt with him."

In 1707, Mohammad Mo'men Khan Shamlu was replaced with Shahqoli Khan Zanganeh, a son of the former grand vizier Shaykh Ali Khan Zanganeh.

Mohammad Mo'men Khan was the brother of Mohammad Zaman Khan Shamlu, who served as qurchi-bashi (head of the qurchi and sepahsalar (commander-in-chief). Mohammad Mo'men Khan's son Mohammad Qoli Khan Shamlu also served as grand vizier.

== Sources ==
- Floor, Willem (2001). Safavid Government Institutions. Mazda Publishers. ISBN 978-1568591353.
- Newman, Andrew J. (2008). Safavid Iran: Rebirth of a Persian Empire. I.B.Tauris. ISBN 978-0857716613.
- Matthee, Rudi (2011). Persia in Crisis: Safavid Decline and the Fall of Isfahan. I.B.Tauris. ISBN 978-0857731814.

Government offices
Preceded by Mohammad Taher Vahid Qazvini	Grand vizier of Safavid Iran; May 1699 – 1707	Succeeded by Shahqoli Khan Zanganeh
