= Saru Khan Sahandlu =

Head of the Safavid royal bodyguard from 1682 to 1691

Saru Khan Sahandlu (Persian: سارو خان سهندلو) was a powerful and high-ranking aristocrat from the Turkoman Sahandlu tribe, who served as the head of the royal bodyguard (qurchi-bashi) from 1682 to 1691. In 1690, he had 40 members of the Zanganeh tribe killed, which made the Zanganeh nobleman Shahqoli Khan Zanganeh protest to shah Suleiman I (r. 1666–1694), stating that Saru Khan had humiliated the name of his deceased father Shaykh Ali Khan by doing so. Suleiman forgave Saru Khan, due to the good relation they had. However, this was soon to end: in 1691, Suleiman had Saru Khan beheaded due to having a love relationship with Maryam Begum, the aunt of Suleiman.

== Sources ==
- Matthee, Rudi (2011). Persia in Crisis: Safavid Decline and the Fall of Isfahan. I.B.Tauris. pp. 1–371. ISBN 978-0857731814.
