= Royal Council (Safavid Iran) =

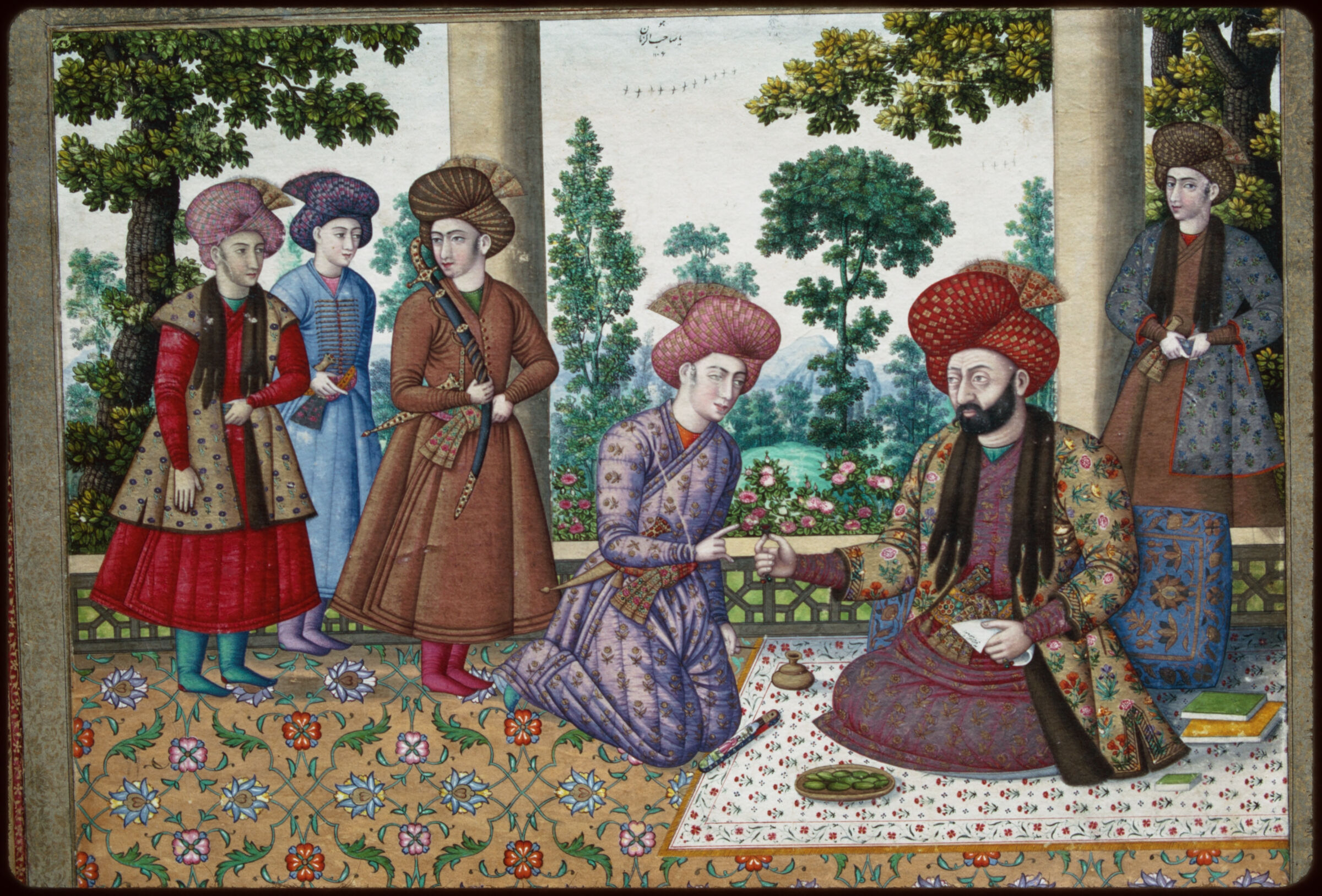
Courtly scene depicting the grand vizier Shahqoli Khan Zanganeh presenting a ring, dated 1694/95

The Royal Council (Persian: دیوَانِ اَعْلٰی, romanized: Divan-e a'la) was the highest governing authority in Safavid Iran, led by the grand vizier. Royal Council meetings frequently took place, under the supervision of the shah. Except in times of civil war (1525–1532 and 1577–1582), when the vakil and Qizilbash leaders were the de facto rulers of the state, the members had no decision-making power. The dominance of the Qizilbash was eradicated under Shah Abbas I (r. 1587–1629), and the Royal Council was taken over by bureaucrats the shah personally selected. Another council also existed at the same time, known as the janqi, which functioned as a privy council and was limited to the most powerful statesmen.

The English traveller Robert Shirley wrote about the Royal Council, noting that each morning, the grand vizier, accompanied by the shah's advisors and secretaries, reviewed the condition of the provinces. Matters were discussed, and opinions were documented by the secretaries. Afterward, the Royal Council presented the recorded documents to the shah, who selected which issues to pursue and which to reject. On Wednesdays, the shah would hold a public council session where people from all social backgrounds could present their petitions. The shah reviewed these, choosing some for further consideration and recording them in a book. If a petition was chosen, it was not allowed to be resubmitted.

Due to the indecisiveness of Shah Soltan Hoseyn (r. 1694–1722), the Royal Council gathered frequently to discuss important and state problems, but typically no meaningful choices were made. Rather than taking responsibility and addressing the internal and foreign dangers to the safety of the state and its population, the various groups within the Royal Council instead attempted to compete with each other. Threats were once made during a Royal Council meeting as a result of the hostility between the Royal Council members. Previously, similar situations would have resulted in the execution of councilors, but during this period it only caused damage to their self-image.

== Sources ==
- Floor, Willem (2001). Safavid Government Institutions. Mazda Publishers. ISBN 978-1568591353.
