= Shahrokh Sultan Zanganeh =

Kurdish aristocrat

Shahrokh Sultan Zanganeh (Persian: شاهرخ سلطان زنگنه, died 1639), was a Kurdish aristocrat who belonged to the Zanganeh tribe, a Shia Kurdish tribe native to the Kermanshah province. Not much is known about Shahrokh Sultan. In 1639, he became the chieftain of the Zanganeh tribe, but died during the same year. He was succeeded by his brother Shaykh Ali Khan Zanganeh.

== Sources ==
- Matthee, Rudi (2011). Persia in Crisis: Safavid Decline and the Fall of Isfahan. I.B.Tauris. pp. 1–371. ISBN 978-0857731814.
- Matthee, Rudi. "ŠAYḴ-ʿALI KHAN ZANGANA". Encyclopaedia Iranica.

| Unknown | Chieftain of the Zanganeh tribe 1639 | Succeeded by Shaykh Ali Khan Zanganeh |
