= Mohammad Taher Vahid Qazvini =

Iranian Safavid grand vizier from 1691 to 1699

Mirza Mohammad Taher Vahid Qazvini
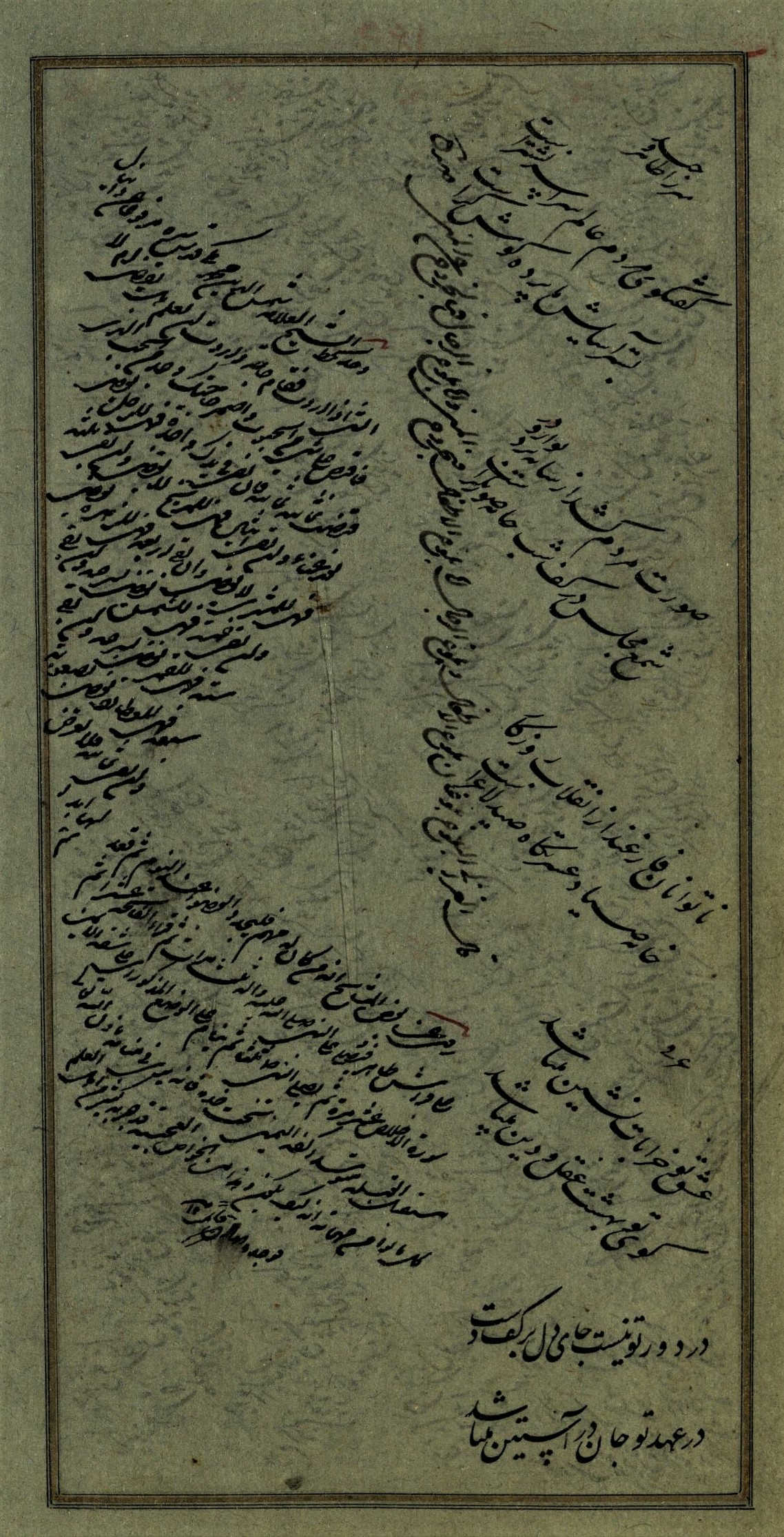
- Folio of a poem by Mohammad Taher Vahid Qazvini

Grand vizier of Safavid Iran
- In office March 1691 – May 1699
- Monarchs: Shah Suleiman (r. 1666–1694); Soltan Hoseyn (r. 1694–1722)
- Preceded by: Shaykh Ali Khan Zanganeh
- Succeeded by: Mohammad Mo'men Khan Shamlu

Personal details
- Born: c. 1621 Qazvin, Safavid Iran
- Died: 1700 (aged c. 70) Safavid Iran
- Parent: Mirza Mohammad (father)
- Occupation: Bureaucrat, poet, historian
- Notable work: Abbas-nama

Mirza Mohammad Taher Vahid Qazvini (Persian: محمد‌طاهر وحید قزوینی; died 1700), was an Iranian bureaucrat, poet, and historian, who served as the grand vizier of two Safavid monarchs, Shah Suleiman (r. 1666–1694) and the latter's son Soltan Hoseyn (r. 1694–1722) from 1691 to 1699.

He is also notable for writing the Abbas-nama, the principal Iranian source regarding the events during the reign of Shah Abbas II (r. 1642–1666).

== Background ==
A native of Qazvin, Taher Vahid was born around 1621. (Note: According to the Iranologist Rudi Matthee, Taher Vahid was "about seventy" when he was appointed grand vizier in 1691.) He was of Persian Sayyid ancestry, and belonged to a family that was notable for occupying the office of vaqa'i-nevis (court registrar). His father Mirza Mohammad had occupied the office under Shah Abbas I (r. 1588–1629), and Taher Vahid would also later occupy it.

== Career ==
Taher Vahid served as a chronicler during the reign of Shah Abbas II (r. 1642–1666), composing the Abbas-nama, the principal Iranian source regarding the events during the reign of Shah Abbas II.

In March 1691, Shah Suleiman (r. 1666–1694) appointed Taher Vahid as his vizier, following a one year and a half vacancy of the office. The previous grand vizier had been Shaykh Ali Khan Zanganeh. After Taher Vahid's appointment, Shah Suleiman asked his opinion on the most pressing matters of the country, which Taher Vahid replied to by mentioning four serious problems that needed attention: the pay of the army of Iran, fiscal reform, unoccupied offices, and the renewal of trade. Shah Suleiman responded by increasing Taher Vahid's administrative authority to an unmatched level.

Taher Vahid continued to serve as vizier under Shah Suleiman's son and successor, Soltan Hoseyn (r. 1694–1722). Taher Vahid, as well to a lesser degree the court steward (nazer) Najafqoli Khan, were the main counselors of Soltan Hoseyn during his early reign. In May 1699, Soltan Hoseyn dismissed Taher Vahid, supposedly due to the latter's old age. He replaced him with the eshik-aqasi-bashi Mohammad Mo'men Khan Shamlu, who, however, was also advanced in age.

Taher Vahid died in 1700.

== Poetry ==
Taher Vahid was also a poet, composing 35,000 verses in various genres. He also known to have sent poems to the Mughal Empire, although they have not been published yet. Based on Taher Vahid's writings, the modern historian Sunil Sharma comments that "it is evident that his role in the intellectual and literary life of seventeenth-century Persianate circles was not at all insignificant." Hamid Dabashi lists Taher Vahid amongst some of the leading Iranian poets of the Indian style who had never visited India, along with Shafi'i Mashhadi, Asir-e Esfahani and Shaukat Bukhari. Taher Vahid is also known to have composed poetry in Azeri Turkish.

== Sources ==
- Dabashi, Hamid (2012). The World of Persian Literary Humanism. Harvard University Press. ISBN 978-0-674-06759-2.
- Javadi, H.; Burrill, K. (1988). "Azerbaijan x. Azeri Turkish Literature". In Yarshater, Ehsan (ed.). Encyclopædia Iranica. Vol. III/3: Azerbaijan IV–Bačča(-ye) Saqqā. London and New York: Routledge & Kegan Paul. pp. 251–255. ISBN 978-0-71009-115-4.
- Losensky, Paul (2021). "Not all of the poets went to India: literary culture in Iran under Safavid rule". In Matthee, Rudi (ed.). The Safavid World. Routledge. pp. 447–468.
- Matthee, Rudi (2011). Persia in Crisis: Safavid Decline and the Fall of Isfahan. I.B.Tauris. ISBN 978-0857731814.
- Matthee, Rudi; Floor, Willem; Clawson, Patrick (2013). The Monetary History of Iran: From the Safavids to the Qajars. I.B.Tauris. ISBN 978-0857721723.
- Matthee, Rudi (2015). "Solṭān Ḥosayn". Encyclopaedia Iranica.
- Newman, Andrew J. (2008). Safavid Iran: Rebirth of a Persian Empire. I.B.Tauris. ISBN 978-0857716613.
- Moreen, Vera B. (2010). "ʿAbbās-nāma". In Norman A. Stillman (ed.). Encyclopedia of Jews in the Islamic World. Brill Online.
- Sharma, Sunil (2017). Mughal Arcadia: Persian Literature in an Indian Court. Harvard University Press. ISBN 978-0674975859.
- Sharma, Sunil (2021). "Local and Transregional Places in the Works of Safavid Men of Letters". In Melville, Charles (ed.). Safavid Persia in the Age of Empires: The Idea of Iran. Vol. 10. I.B. Tauris. pp. 309–330.

Government offices
Preceded by Shaykh Ali Khan Zanganeh	Vizier of the Safavid Empire; March 1691 – May 1699	Succeeded by Mohammad Mo'men Khan Shamlu
