= Fath-Ali Khan Daghestani =

Lezgian nobleman

Grand vizier of Safavid Iran
- In office July 1716 – November 1720
- Monarch: Sultan Husayn
- Preceded by: Shahqoli Khan Zanganeh
- Succeeded by: Mohammad Qoli Khan Shamlu

Personal details
- Born: 1673/1674 Daghestan (?)
- Died: After 1721 Shiraz
- Spouse: Unnamed Zanganeh noblewoman
- Parent: Safi Khan Lezgi (Alqas Mirza) (father)
- Relatives: Lotf-Ali Khan Daghestani (nephew & brother-in-law)

Fath-Ali Khan Daghestani (Persian: فتحعلی خان داغستانی), was a Lezgian nobleman, who served as the Grand Vizier of the Safavid shah (king) Soltan Hoseyn (r. 1694–1722) from 1716 to 1720.

A member of an aristocratic Lezgian family native to Daghestan, Daghestani was unlike the earlier Safavid grand viziers, a Sunnite, which was a religious sect of Islam that often faced persecution from the Safavid state. Although this did not stop Daghestani from rising in power and influence—in July 1716, he was appointed as grand vizier by the indecisive and weak Sultan Husayn, who had little interest in political affairs, thus letting Daghestani take care of most of the affairs of the country.

This, however, resulted in Daghestani making a lot of enemies, who eventually in 1720 had Daghestani removed from power by a ruse. He was thereafter blinded and exiled in Shiraz, where he later died. He was succeeded by Mohammad Qoli Khan Shamlu.

== Family ==
Daghestani was a son of Safi Khan Lezgi (Alqas Mirza), who was the son of Aldas (Ildas) Mirza Shamkhal, also known as Ildirim Khan Shamkhal, and therefore a member of the family of the Shamkhal of Kumukh. A noble Lezgian family, they traditionally governed the area at the Terek river in the Safavid province of Daghestan. Like the majority of the Lezgians, he was a Sunni Muslim. Nevertheless, Daghestani and the rest of his clan had long enjoyed a favorite status at the Safavid court. Of Daghestani's many relatives, a large number held high-ranking positions as well. Amongst them were his nephew Hasan-Ali Khan Daghestani who served as the governor of Shirvan and Shamakhi, his brother Aslan Khan Daghestani who served as governor of Kuhgiluyeh and Astarabad, as well as Lotf-Ali Khan Daghestani who was both his nephew and brother-in-law, and who functioned as the governor of Fars for several years.

== Biography ==
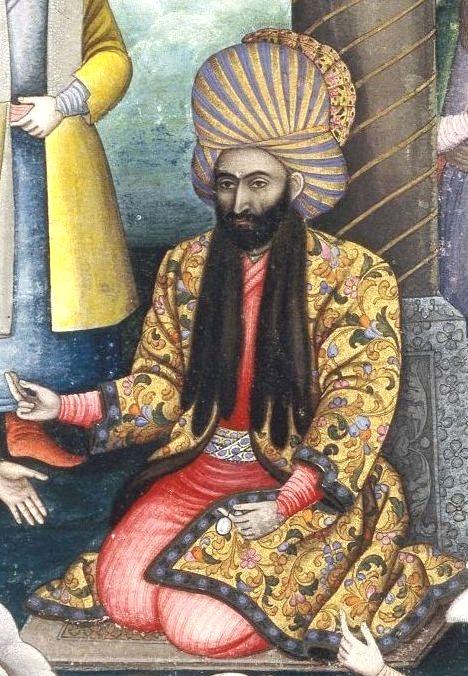
Sultan Husayn, 18th-century illustration.

Daghestani was appointed as grand vizier in ca. 1716, thus succeeding the Zanganeh nobleman Shahqoli Khan Zanganeh, whom Daghestani was the son-in-law of. In 1719, rebellious Sunni Lezgins overran Shirvan and killed the governor of the province, and thereafter attacked Georgia, which resulted in the eruption of a set of episodes that ultimately ended in the downfall and dismissal of Daghestani in the year after.

At this time, Shah Sultan Husayn had recently restored the sepahsalar (commander-in-chief) Vakhtang VI (Hosaynqoli Khan) as wali ("viceroy") of Kartli and sent him back to Georgia with the task of suppressing the Lezgian rebellion. At the same time, several enemies of Daghestani were planning to have him removed from power, allegedly because he was a Sunnite. The people behind the scheme were the molla-bashi (chief theologian) Mohammad-Hosayn Tabrizi, and the hakim-bashi (chief physician) Rahim Khan, who presented the shah a fake letter as proof that Daghestani had been conspiring with a Kurdish chieftain to have him murdered.

They also cautioned the shah that Daghestani's daughter was married to Hosaynqoli Khan's half-brother Rostam Khan, the qollar-aghasi ("chief of the ghulams"), and implied that a triumphant Hosaynqoli Khan was a bigger threat to Iran than the rebellious Lezgians. They thus managed to convince the shah to order Vakhtang to abort his campaign against the Lezgians. Furthermore, they also convinced the shah to have Daghestani executed.

On 8 December 1720, the qurchi-bashi ("head of the royal bodyguard"), Mohammadqoli Khan, who was himself a member of the conspiracy against Daghestani, was ordered to execute the latter. He did, however, have him tortured instead, in order to obtain his riches, for which he was famous for. Daghestani was eventually blinded, whilst his relative Lotf-Ali Khan was seized and jailed. Shah Sultan Husayn allegedly later regretted his approach on Daghestani—nonetheless, he deemed it incautious to permit him to stay in Tehran, and had him sent to Shiraz, where he died in imprisonment at an unknown date.

== Sources ==
- Blow, David (2009). Shah Abbas: The Ruthless King Who became an Iranian Legend. London, UK: I. B. Tauris & Co. Ltd. ISBN 978-1-84511-989-8. LCCN 2009464064.
- Floor, Willem (2001). Safavid Government Institutions. Costa Mesa, California: Mazda Publishers. ISBN 978-1568591353.
- Floor, Willem M. (2008). Titles and Emoluments in Safavid Iran: A Third Manual of Safavid Administration, by Mirza Naqi Nasiri. Washington, DC: Mage Publishers. pp. 152–253, 257, 278–279, 281, 283, 287. ISBN 978-1933823232.
- Matthee, Rudi (2012). Persia in Crisis: Safavid Decline and the Fall of Isfahan. I.B.Tauris. pp. 1–371. ISBN 978-1845117450.
- Babaie, Sussan (2004). Slaves of the Shah: New Elites of Safavid Iran. I.B.Tauris. pp. 1–218. ISBN 9781860647215.
- Savory, Roger (1993). "DĀḠESTĀNĪ, FATḤ ʿALĪ KHAN". Encyclopaedia Iranica, Vol. VI, Fasc. 6. pp. 576–577.
- Newman, Andrew J. (2008). Safavid Iran: Rebirth of a Persian Empire. I.B.Tauris. pp. 1–281. ISBN 9780857716613.
- Savory, Roger (2007). Iran under the Safavids. Cambridge University Press. pp. 1–288. ISBN 978-0521042512.
- Roemer, H.R. (1986). "The Safavid period". The Cambridge History of Iran, Volume 5: The Timurid and Safavid periods. Cambridge: Cambridge University Press. pp. 189–351. ISBN 9780521200943.

Government offices
Preceded by Shah Qoli Khan Zanganeh	Grand Vizier of the Safavid Empire; 1716–1720	Succeeded by Mohammad Qoli Khan Shamlu
