= Shahqoli Khan Zanganeh =

Grand Vizier of Iran from 1707 to 1716

Shahqoli Khan Zanganeh شاه‌قلی‌خان زنگنه
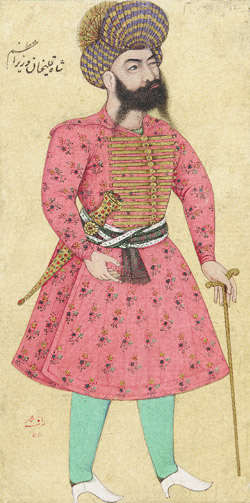
- Portrait of Shahqoli Khan Zanganeh made by Mohammad Zaman in circa 1694/5.

Grand Vizier of the Safavid Empire
- In office 1707–1716
- Monarch: Soltan Hoseyn (r. 1694–1722)
- Preceded by: Mohammad Mo'men Khan Shamlu
- Succeeded by: Fath-Ali Khan Daghestani

Head of the Royal Bodyguard
- In office 1691–1699
- Preceded by: Saru Khan Sahandlu
- Succeeded by: Unknown

Personal details
- Born: 17th century Safavid Iran
- Died: 1716 Safavid Iran
- Religion: Islam

Shahqoli Khan Zanganeh (Persian: شاه‌قلی‌خان زنگنه, died 1716), was a Kurdish nobleman, who served as the vizier of the Safavid king (shah) Soltan Hoseyn (r. 1694–1722) from 1707 to 1716.

== Family ==
Shahqoli was the third son of Shaykh Ali Khan Zanganeh, who also served as vizier from 1669 to 1689, whose other sons were: Hossein Ali Khan Zanganeh, Suleiman Khan Zanganeh, Ismail Beg Zanganeh, Abbas Beg Zanganeh, and Abbas Qoli Beg Zanganeh. The family belonged to the Zanganeh tribe, a Shia Kurdish tribe native to the Kermanshah province.

== Biography ==
Shahqoli is first mentioned in the 1680s, as being appointed the governor of Kermanshah province. In 1689, his father died due to illness. One year later, a powerful and high-ranking aristocrat of the Turkoman Sahandlu tribe named Saru Khan Sahandlu, had 40 members of the Kurdish Zanganeh tribe killed, which made Shahqoli protest to shah Suleiman I, stating that Saru Khan had humiliated the name of his deceased father by doing so. Due to their good relations, Suleiman forgave Saru Khan. However, this was soon to end: in 1691, Suleiman had Saru Khan Sahandlu beheaded due to him having a love relationship with Suleiman's aunt, Maryam Begum.

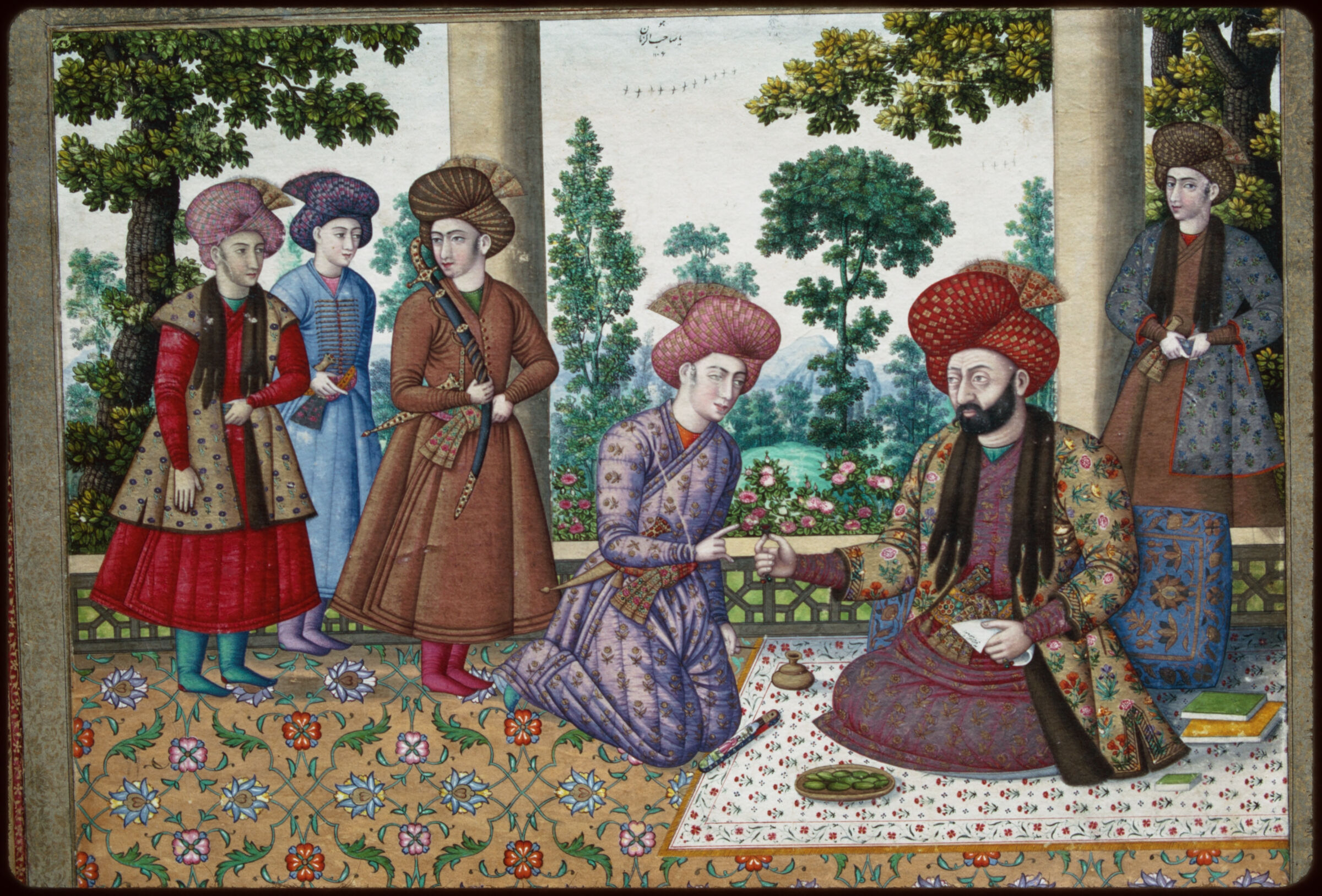
Shahqoli Khan presents a ring to a youthfull courtier, 1694–95.

The shah then appointed Shahqoli as the head of the royal bodyguard (qurchi-bashi), thus succeeding Saru Khan. After having been appointed to such as high-ranking office, a rivalry with the recently appointed vizier Mohammad Taher Vahid Qazvini followed. In 1694, Suleiman died and was succeeded by his son Soltan Hoseyn, who later in 1699, appointed a Turkoman member of the Shamlu tribe named Mohammad Mo'men Khan Shamlu, as the new vizier.

In 1707, Shahqoli Khan was appointed as the new vizier of the empire. Shahqoli Khan died in 1716, and was succeeded by his son-in-law Fath-Ali Khan Daghestani. Shahqoli had a son, also named Shaykh Ali Khan, who although did not reach the same height of power as his father and grandfather, still served in high-office under the Safavids.

== Sources ==
- Newman, Andrew J. (2008). Safavid Iran: Rebirth of a Persian Empire. I.B.Tauris. pp. 1–281. ISBN 9780857716613.
- Matthee, Rudi (2011). Persia in Crisis: Safavid Decline and the Fall of Isfahan. I.B.Tauris. pp. 1–371. ISBN 978-0857731814.
- Lambton, A.K.S. (1954). "Kirmānshāh". The Encyclopaedia of Islam. BRILL. pp. 167–171. ISBN 9789004060562.
- Matthee, Rudi (1999). The Politics of Trade in Safavid Iran: Silk for Silver, 1600-1730. Cambridge University Press. pp. 1–290. ISBN 0521641314.
- Yamaguchi, Akihiko (2023). "Mediating between the Royal Court and the Periphery: The Zangana Family's Brokerage in Safavid Iran (1501–1722)". Iran: Journal of the British Institute of Persian Studies. doi:10.1080/05786967.2023.2170814.

Preceded by Saru Khan Sahandlu	Head of the royal bodyguard (Qurchi-bashi); 1691-1699	Unknown
Preceded by Mohammad Mo'men Khan Shamlu	Vizier of the Safavid Empire; 1707 - 1716	Succeeded by Fath-Ali Khan Daghestani
