= Chaharbagh School =

Historic complex in Isfahan, Iran

Chaharbagh Religious School مدرسه چهارباغ
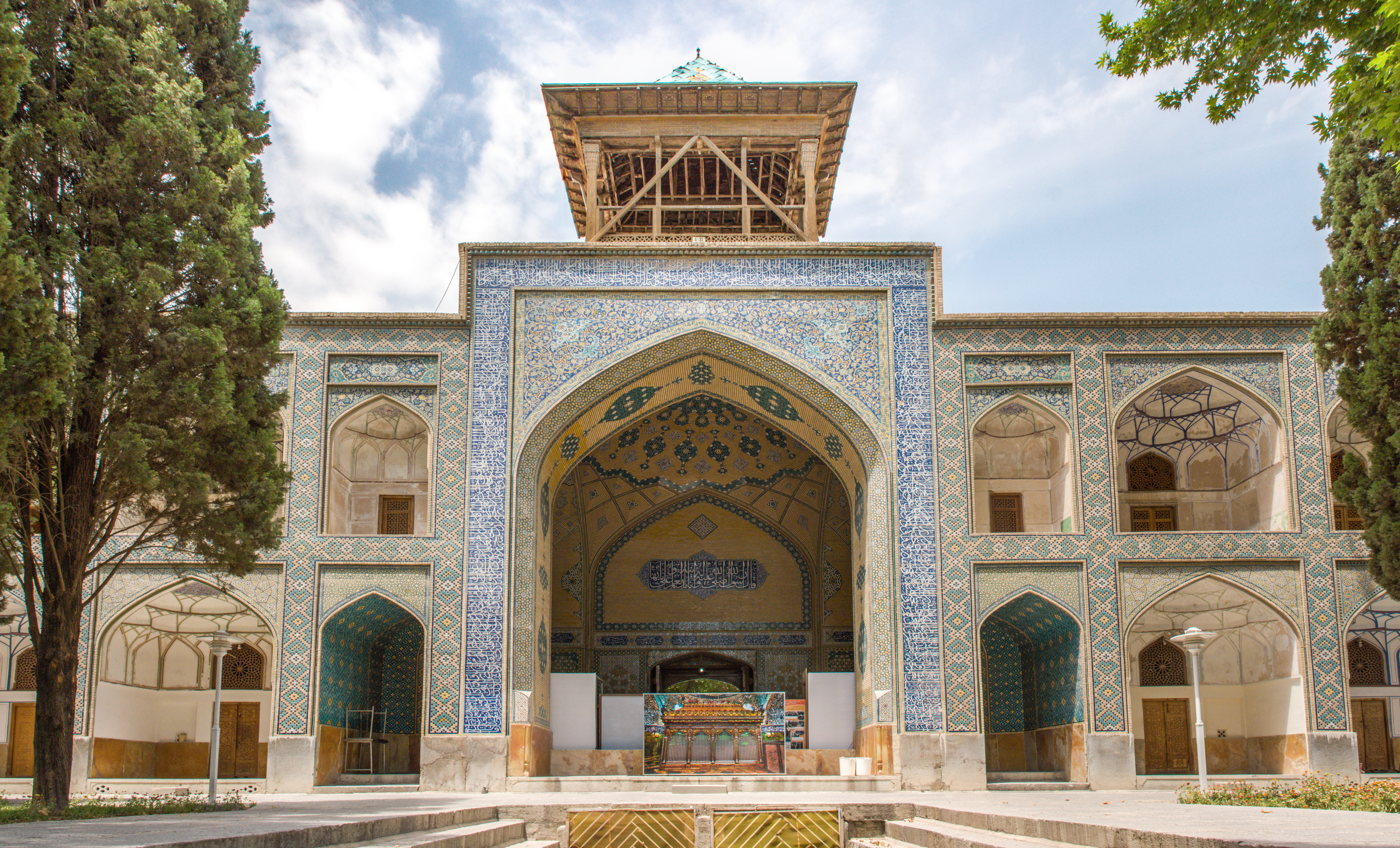

- Location within Iran
- 32.6518°N 51.6692°E
- Location: Isfahan, Iran

Iran National Heritage List
- Official name: Chaharbagh Religious School
- Type: Religious School
- Designated: 1932
- Reference no.: 118
- Conservation organization: Cultural Heritage, Handicrafts and Tourism Organization of Iran

Chahār Bāgh School or the Chahār Bāgh Madrasa (Persian: مدرسه چهارباغ, romanized: Madrese-ye Chahār Bāgh, lit. 'School of the Four Gardens'), also known as Madrese-ye Madar-e Shah, is a 17–18th century cultural complex in Isfahan, Iran. The compound was built in the late Safavid era, during the reign of Shah Soltan Hoseyn, to serve as a theological and clerical school.

== Gallery ==
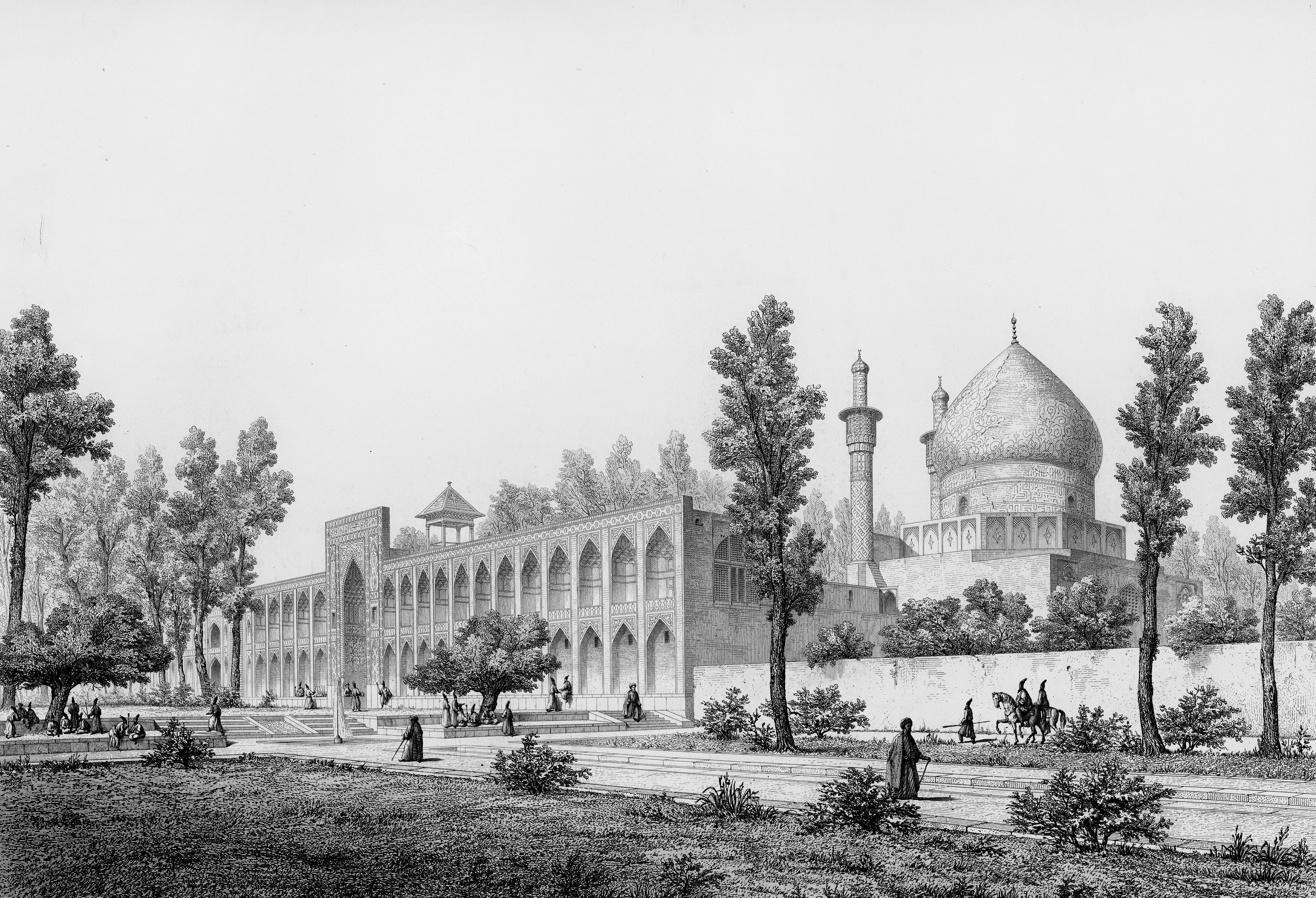
19th century drawing of the school by French architect Pascal Coste

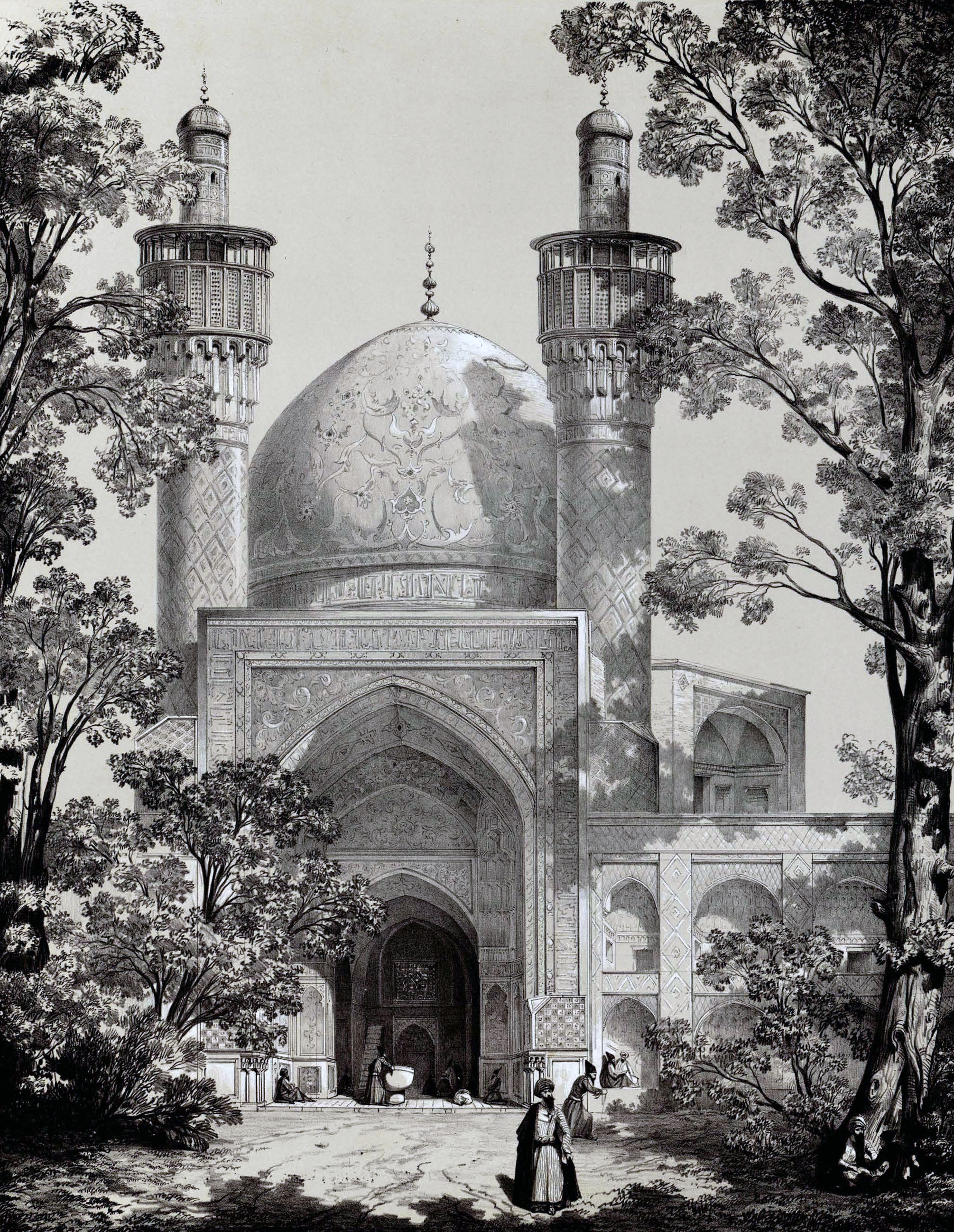
The Shah Soltan Hoseyn Mosque by Eugène Flandin, 1840

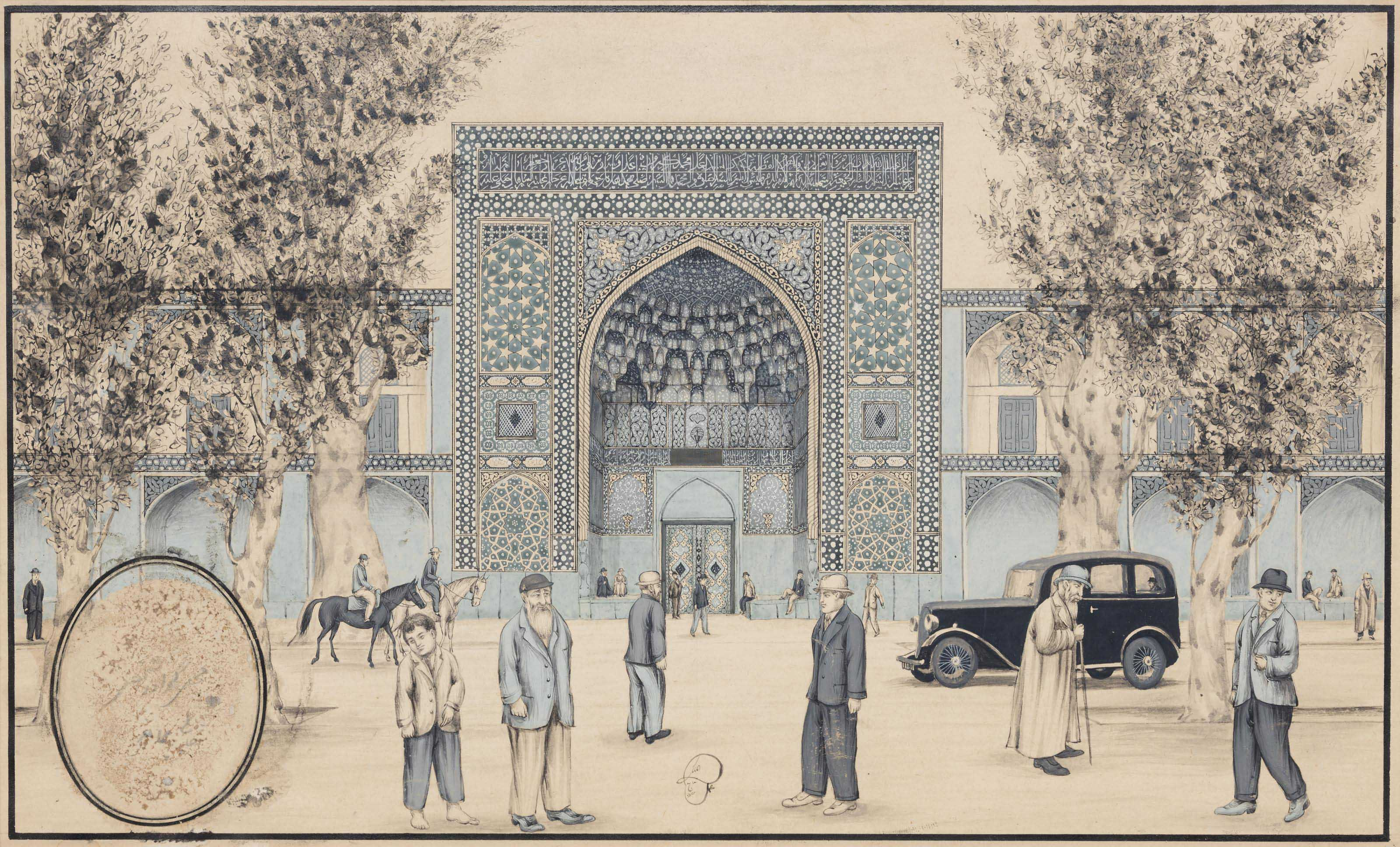
A Street View of the Chahar Bagh Madrasa in Isfahan by Mohammad Hossein Mosavvar-ol-Molki, early 20th century

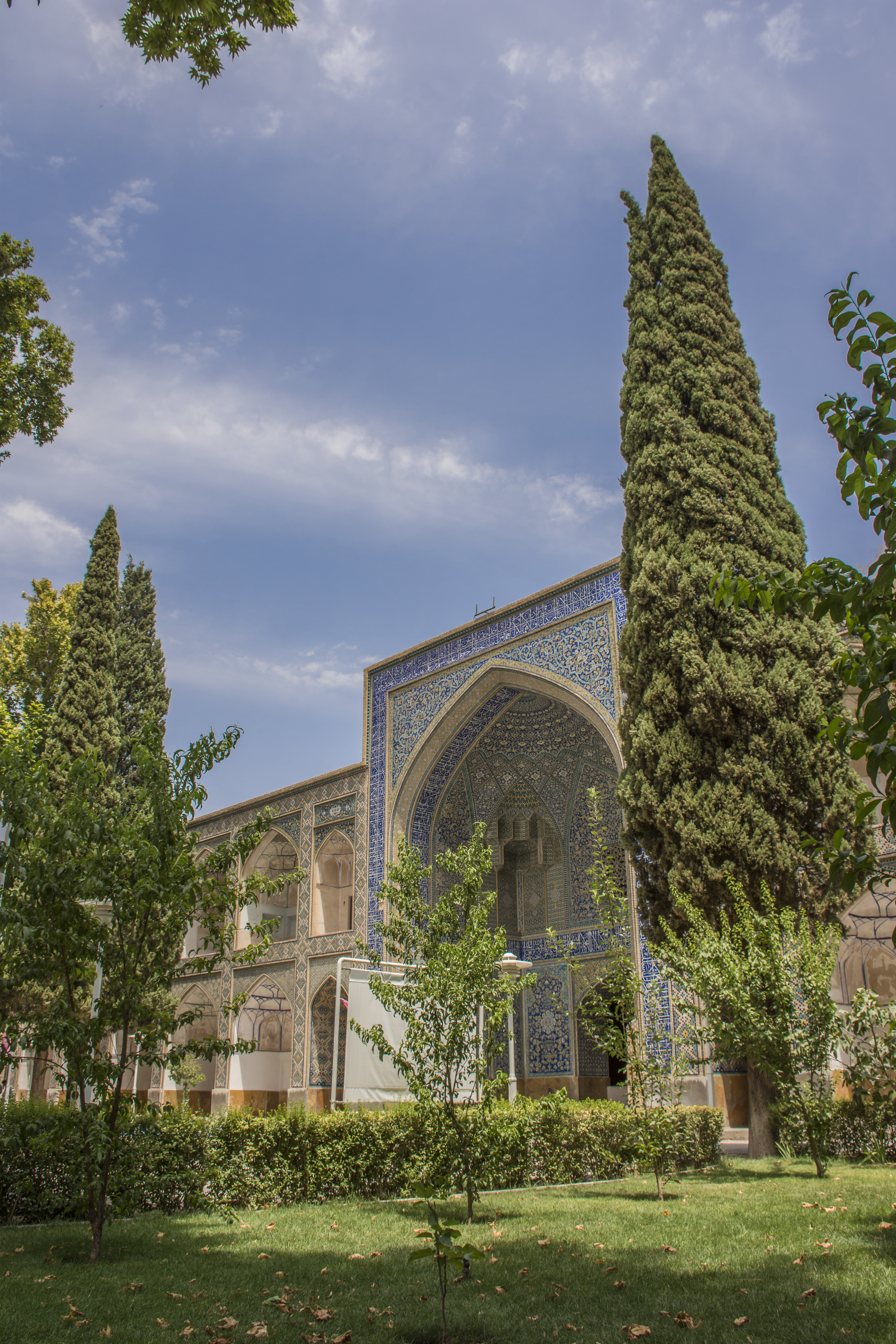

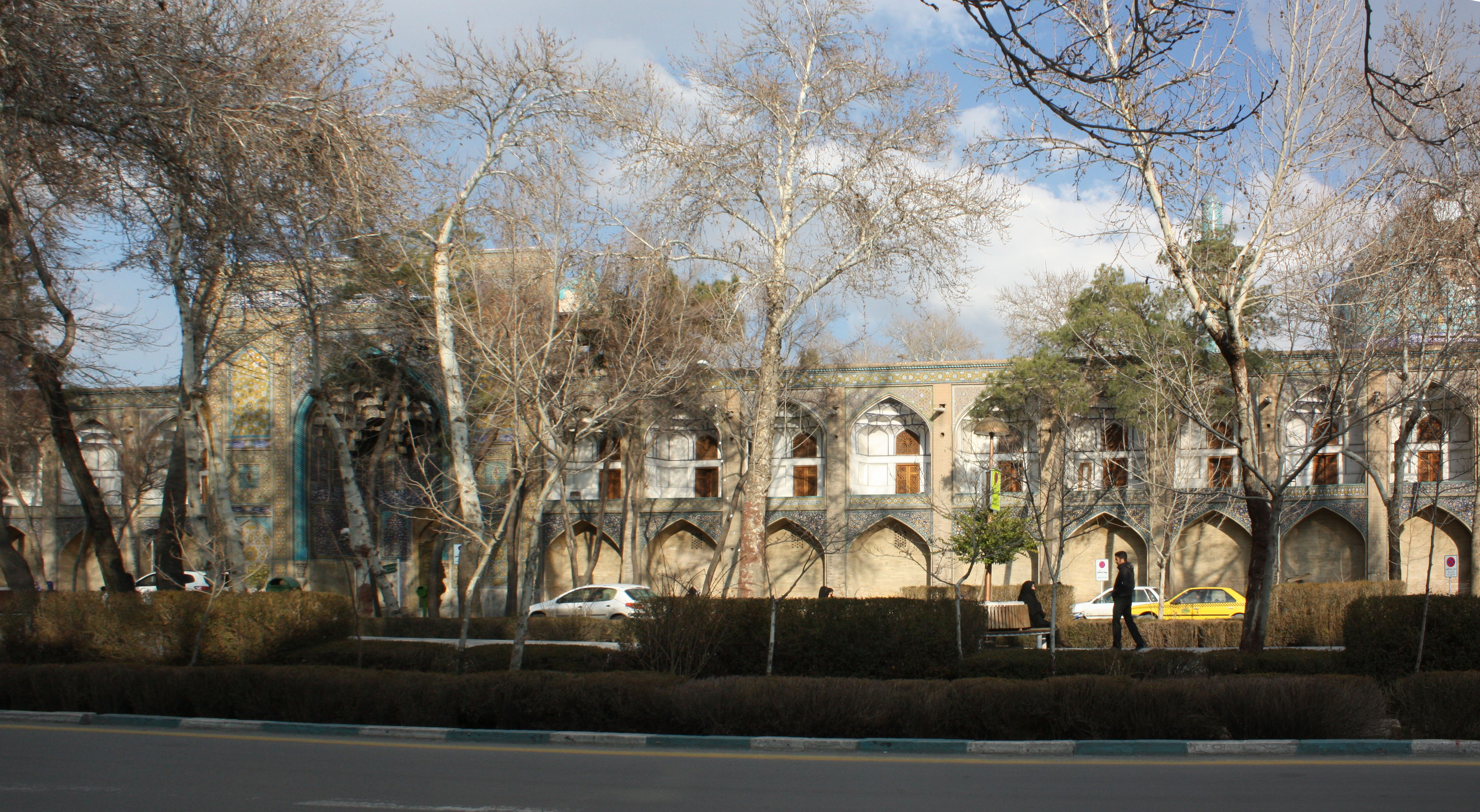

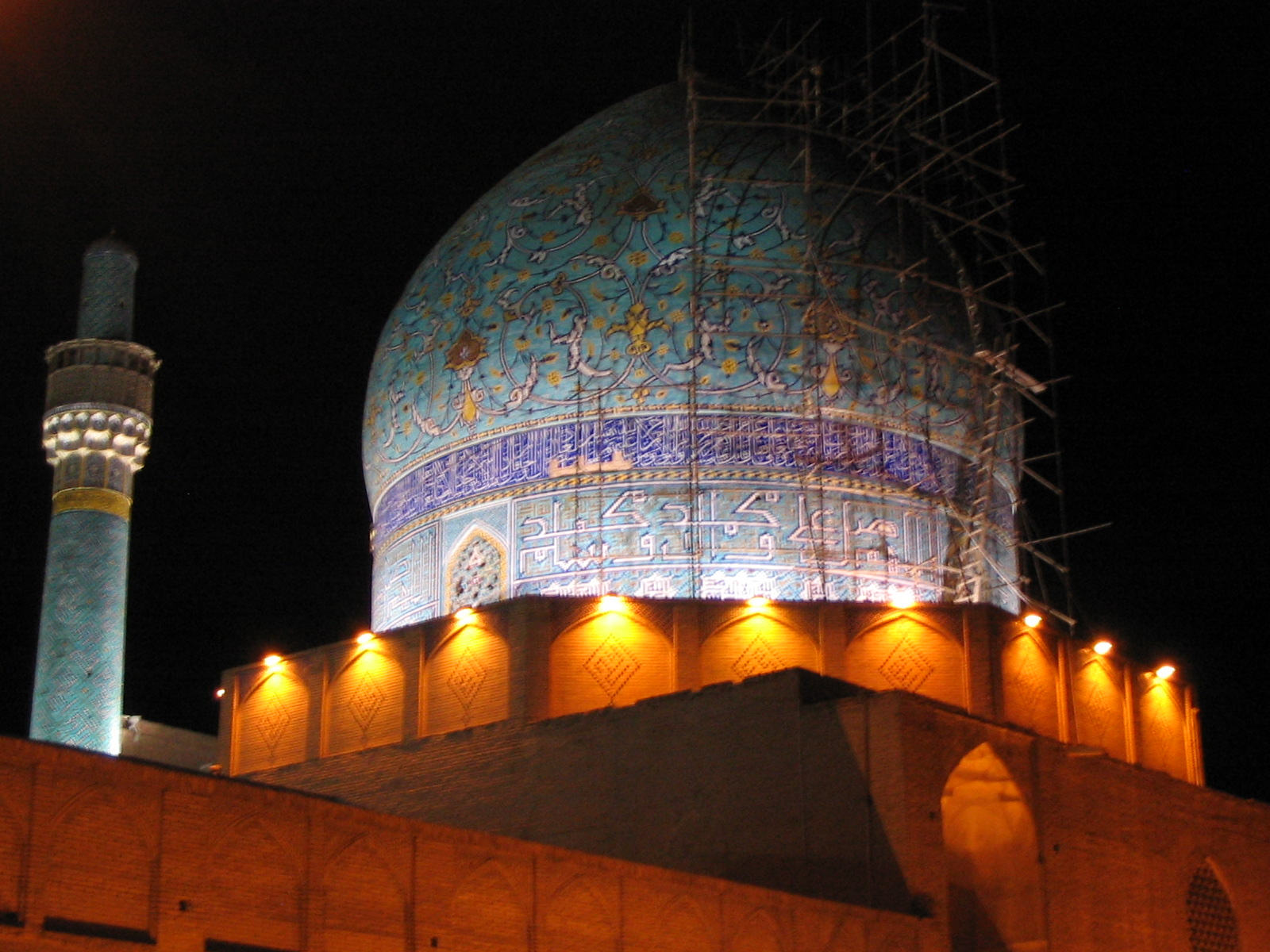

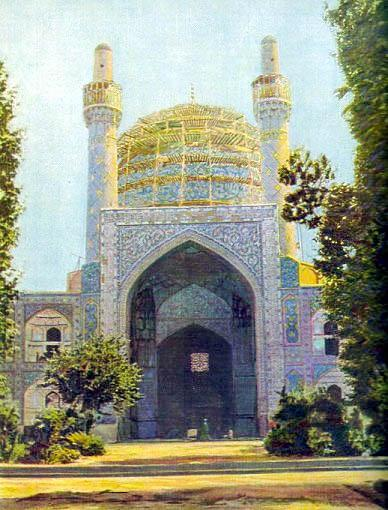

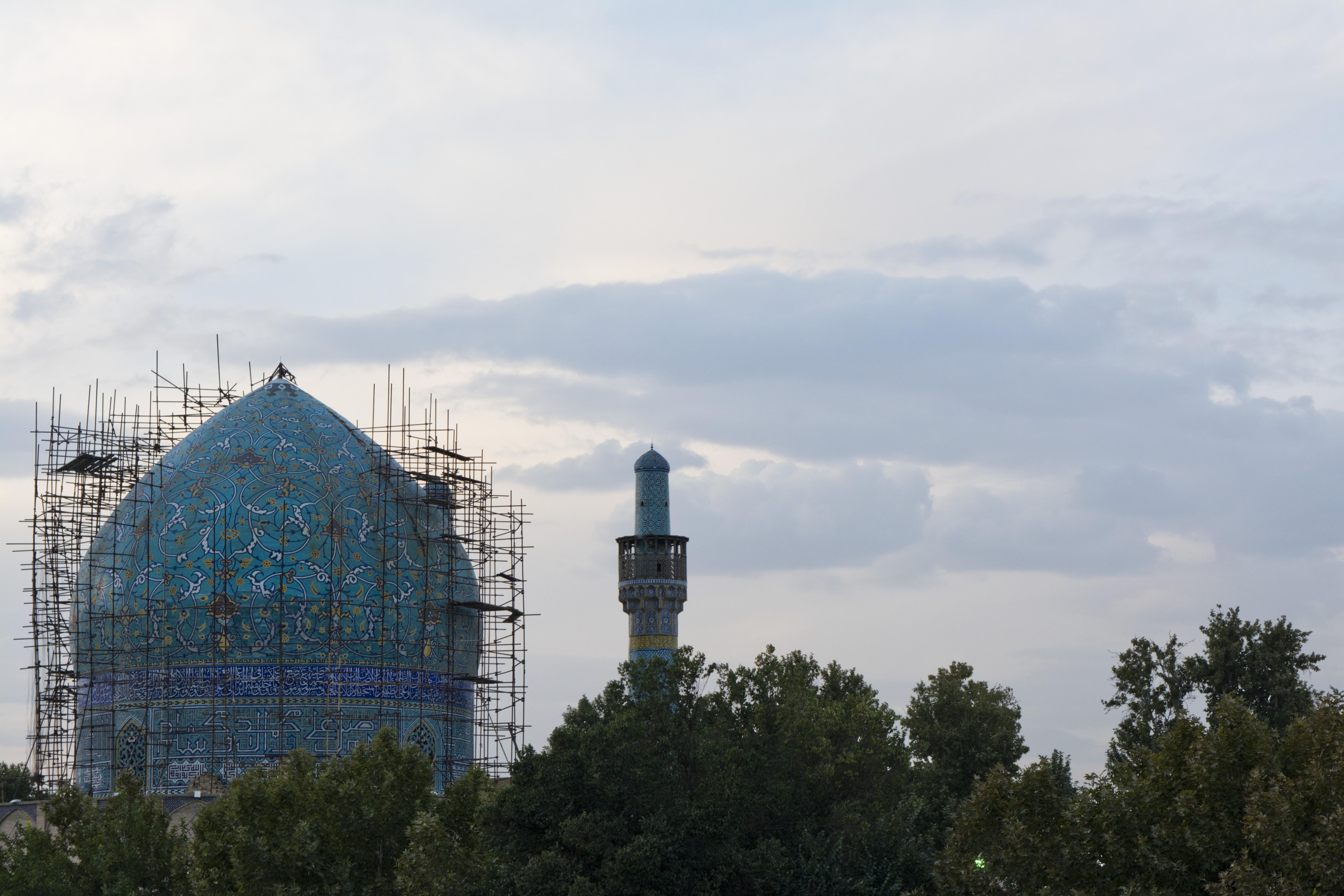

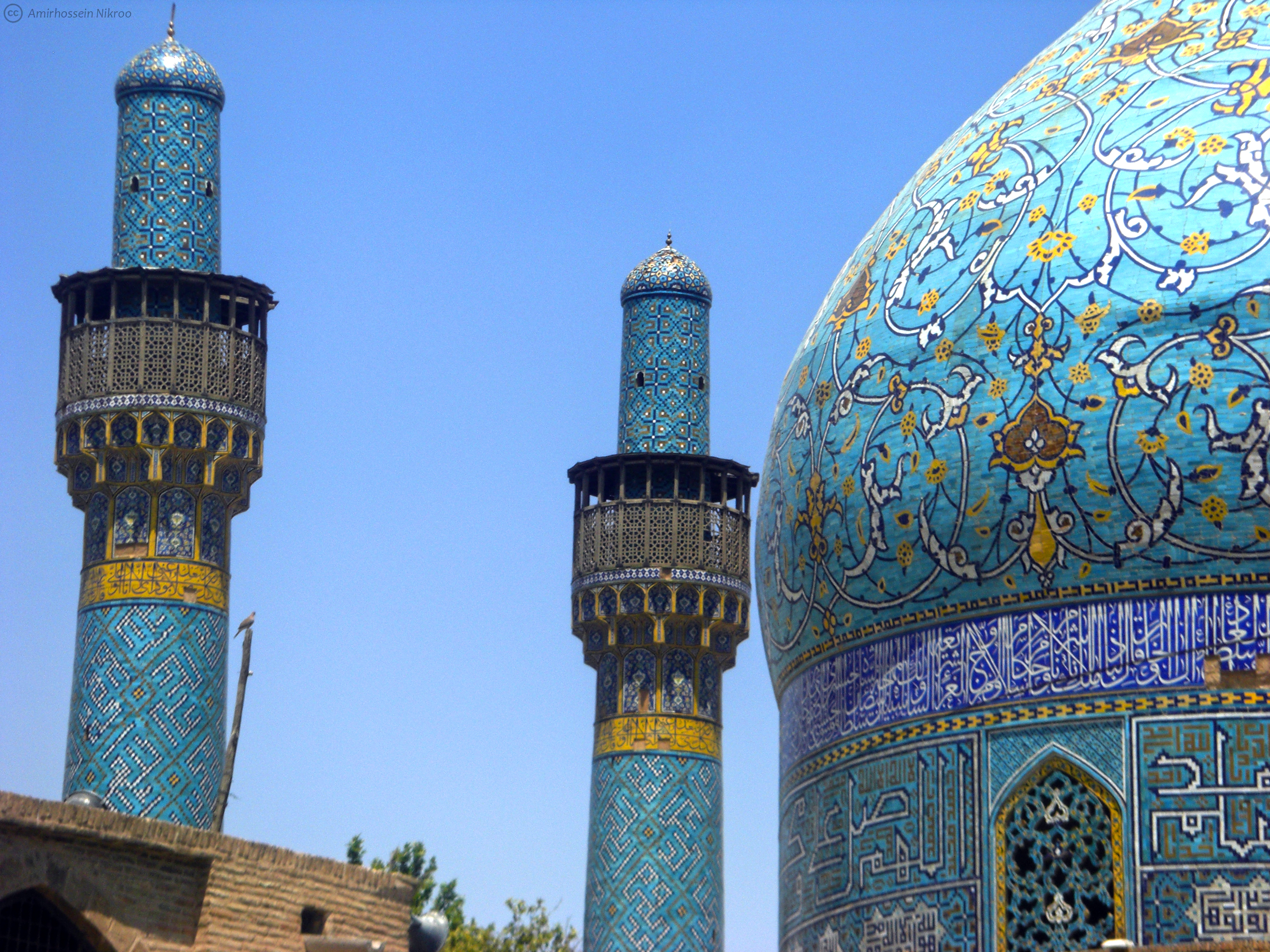

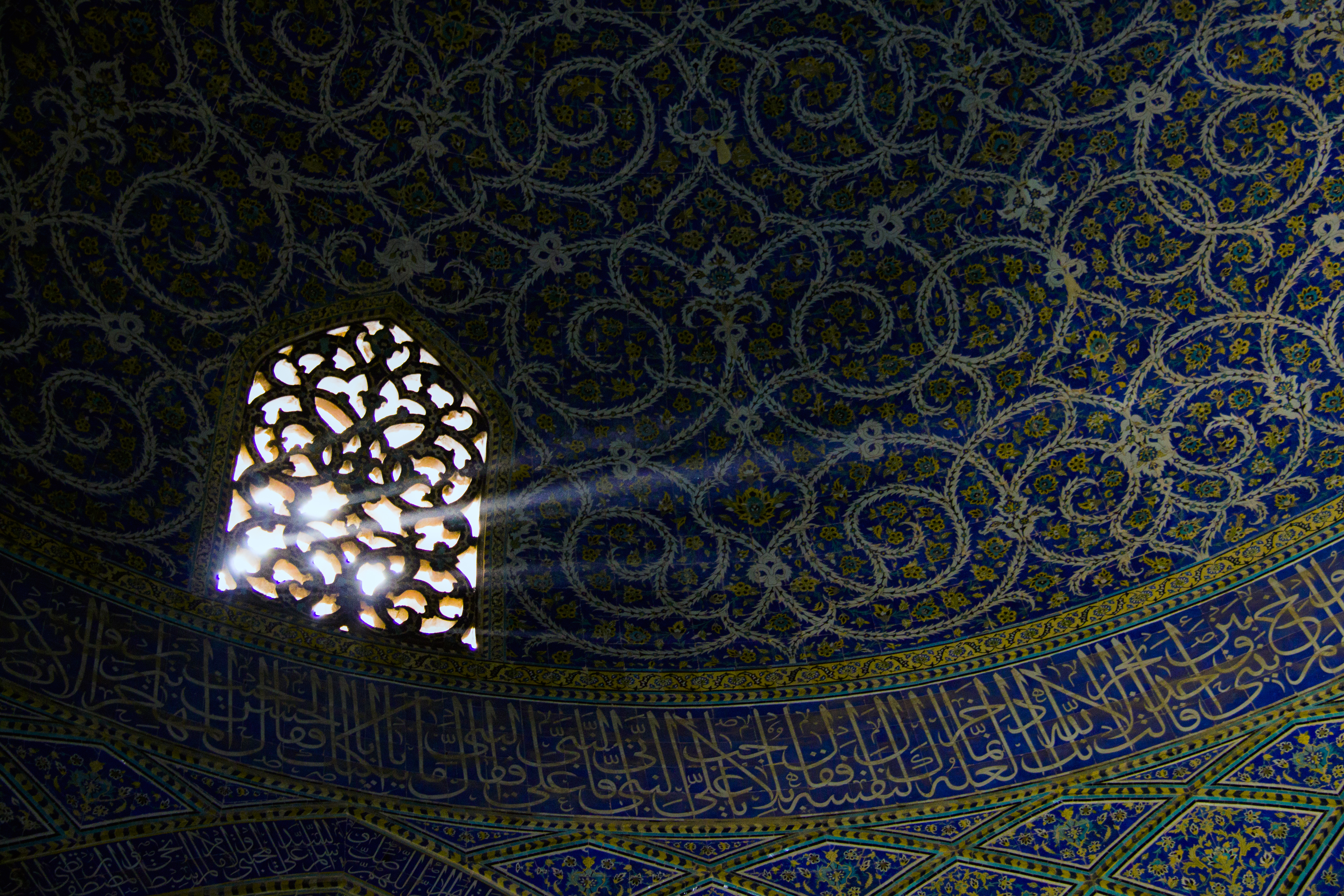

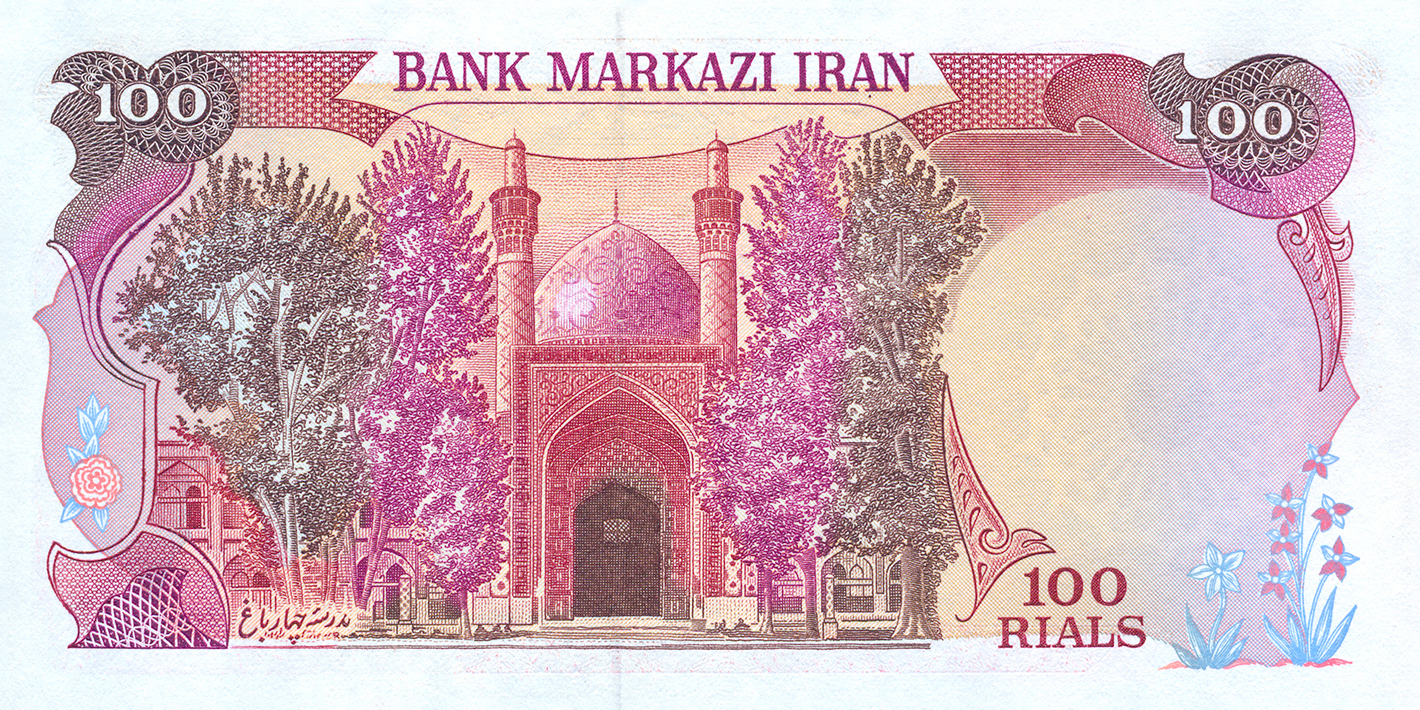

== See also ==
- Iranian architecture
- Persian domes
