= Abd al-Hoseyn Khatunabadi =

Iranian historian

Abd al-Hoseyn Khatunabadi (Persian: عبدالحسین خاتون آبادی; 23 March 1630 – March 1694) was a 17th-century Persian historian of Safavid Iran, who is principally known for his historical chronicle of Vaqa'e' al-senin, referred to as the "most important source from the last decades of Safavid rule."

Khatunabadi belonged to a prominent family of sayyid origin, which traced its ancestry back to the Shi'i imam Ali ibn Husayn Zayn al-Abidin (died 713). Although the family lived in Isfahan, they originally came from Qom, where they occupied the office of naqib (head of the sayyid families) hereditarily. It was Khatunabadi's paternal great-grandfather, Mir Emad al-Din Mohammad (also known as Shahmorad), who had moved to Isfahan in the 16th century, settling in a small village nearby, named Khatunabad.

Khatunabadi received his education in Isfahan, mostly under his father. He later attended the lectures of the pishnamaz (prayer imam) of Isfahan, Molla Reza-qoli (died 1661/62) at the Shah Mosque.

Khatunabadi completed his Vaqa'e' al-senin in 1687/88, organizing it into three segments.

== Sources ==
- Babaie, Sussan (2021). "Safavid Town Planning". In Melville, Charles (ed.). Safavid Persia in the Age of Empires: The Idea of Iran. Vol. 10. I.B. Tauris. pp. 105–132.
- Ghereghlou, Kioumars (2017). "Ḵātunābādi, ʿAbd-al-Ḥosayn". In Yarshater, Ehsan (ed.). Encyclopædia Iranica (Online ed.). Encyclopædia Iranica Foundation.
