= Mohammad Qoli Khan Shamlu =

Safavid grand vizier in 1721–1722

Grand vizier of Safavid Iran
- In office 1721–1722
- Monarch: Soltan Hoseyn
- Preceded by: Fath-Ali Khan Daghestani
- Succeeded by: Rajab Ali Beg

Mohammad Qoli Khan Shamlu (Persian: محمد قلی خان شاملو) was a Turkoman nobleman from the Shamlu tribe, who briefly served as the Grand Vizier of the Safavid king (shah) Soltan Hoseyn (r. 1694–1722) from 1721 to 1722. He was succeeded by Rajab Ali Beg.

== Sources ==
- Matthee, Rudi (2011). Persia in Crisis: Safavid Decline and the Fall of Isfahan. I.B.Tauris. pp. 1–371. ISBN 978-0857731814.

Government offices
Preceded by Fath-Ali Khan Daghestani	Grand Vizier of the Safavid Empire; 1721-1722	Succeeded by Fath-Ali Khan Qajar
