= Shaukat Bukhari =

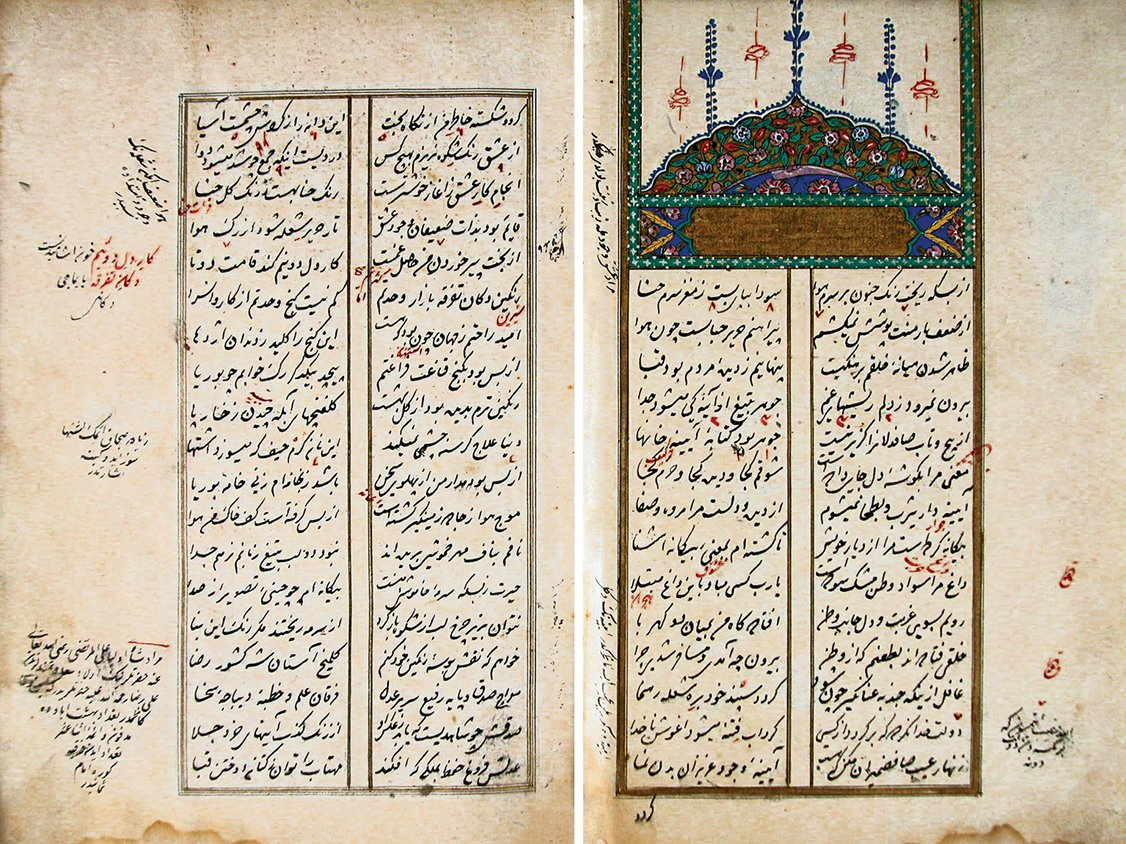
- The first two pages of Shaukat Bukhari's divan (collection of poetry). Located in the Süleymaniye Library in Turkey
- Born: Bukhara, Khanate of Bukhara
- Died: 1695/96; Isfahan, Safavid Iran
- Resting place: Isfahan
- Occupation: Poet
- Writing career
- Language: Persian

Shaukat Bukhari (Persian: شوکت بخارایی) was a 17th-century poet who wrote in Persian.

In his early years, Shaukat lived in Bukhara, following his father's trade as a money changer before moving to Khorasan. Around 1677/78, he started working for Safi Qoli Khan Shamlu, the governor of Herat. Mirza Sa'd al-Din, the vizier of Khorasan, had a long-standing association with Shaukat and showed him much kindness. Despite this, Shaukat eventually chose to withdraw from public life to live in seclusion. He moved to Isfahan, living in self-imposed poverty until his death in 1695/96. There he was buried in the cemetery made in honor of the spiritual leader Ali ibn Sahl Isfahani.

Shaukhat played a key-role in making the Indian style widespread in Persian poetry. Early Persian writers did not acknowledge his work. Nonetheless, in the Ottoman Empire, he was greatly revered, and the Scottish orientalist Elias John Wilkinson Gibb noted that "he continued for more than half a century to be the guiding star for the majority of Ottoman poets."

== Sources ==
- Rahman, Munibur (1997). "S̲h̲awkat Buk̲h̲ārī". In Bosworth, C. E.; van Donzel, E.; Heinrichs, W. P. & Lecomte, G. (eds.). The Encyclopaedia of Islam, Second Edition. Volume IX: San–Sze. Leiden: E. J. Brill. doi:10.1163/1573-3912_islam_SIM_6877. ISBN 978-90-04-10422-8.
