= Shaykh Ali Khan Zanganeh =

Iranian grand vizier of Kurdish origin (1611–1689)

- Engraving (detail) by Kaempfer, 1683-1688.

Grand Vizier of the Safavid Empire
- In office 1669 – 25 October 1689
- Monarch: Shah Suleiman I (r. 1666–1694)
- Preceded by: Mirza Mohammad Karaki
- Succeeded by: Mohammad Taher Vahid Qazvini

Personal details
- Born: 1611 Kermanshah, Safavid Iran
- Died: 1689 (aged 77–78) Isfahan, Safavid Iran
- Children: Shahqoli Khan Zanganeh
- Parent: Ali Beg Zanganeh (father)

Shaykh Ali Khan Zanganeh (Persian: شیخ‌علی‌خان زنگنه; 1611–1689), was a Kurdish statesman who served as the grand vizier of Safavid Iran under Suleiman I, the Safavid emperor (r. 1666–1694), from 1669 to 1689. Due to his efforts in reforming the declining economy, he has been called the "Safavid Amir Kabir" in modern historiography.

Shaykh Ali Khan Zanganeh was one of the most prominent political and administrative figures of the Safavid era. Before rising to the position of Grand Vizier, he governed Kermanshah and the western regions of Iran. He belonged to the distinguished Zanganeh family and was among the leading Kurdish nobles of Iran. During his twenty-year tenure as Grand Vizier, he played a crucial role in stabilizing the country by reforming the taxation system, reorganizing state revenues, reducing administrative corruption, and improving the security of trade routes. He also exerted considerable influence over provincial administration, military organization, and the foreign affairs of the Safavid state.

Because of Shah Suleiman I isolationist tendencies and lack of interest in actively carrying out his royal duties, Shaykh Ali Khan enjoyed broad autonomy and exercised extensive authority during his vizierate. However, he faced intervention from the imperial harem, which compelled him to establish a balance with this powerful court institution, whose influence served to moderate his near-absolute authority.

Many scholars of Safavid history believe that Shaykh Ali Khan's administrative abilities helped maintain relative stability in the Safavid state during the reign of Shah Suleiman, despite the economic and political challenges of the period. For this reason, some modern historians have referred to him as the “Amir Kabir of the Safavid Era.” Among the surviving monuments associated with his name is the historic Shaykh Ali Khan Zanganeh Caravanserai in Isfahan Province, which is considered one of the notable architectural legacies of the Safavid era.

== Family ==
A native of the Kermanshah Province, Shaykh Ali Khan was the son of Ali Beg Zanganeh, and belonged to the Zanganeh tribe, a Shia Kurdish tribe, which was part of the Qizilbash. Shaykh Ali Khan had two brothers named Najaf Qoli Beg Zanganeh and Shahrokh Sultan Zanganeh and also had several sons, whom were: Hossein Ali Khan Zanganeh, Suleiman Khan Zanganeh, Ismail Beg Zanganeh, Abbas Beg Zanganeh, Abbas Qoli Beg Zanganeh, and the most prominent one being Shahqoli Khan Zanganeh, who would also later serve as grand vizier of the country.

== Biography ==
Shaykh Ali Khan's destiny is similar to that of many other Iranian grand viziers—from Hasanak under the Ghaznavids to Amir Kabir under the Qajars—and is owing, in an established sense, to the ambivalence of the grand vizier's position in the Iranian bureaucratic practice.

Shaykh Ali Khan served as the commander of the empire's musketeer corps (tofangchi-aghasi) from 1668 till June 1669.

== Sources ==
- Blow, David (2009). Shah Abbas: The Ruthless King Who Became an Iranian Legend. London, UK: I. B. Tauris. ISBN 978-1-84511-989-8. LCCN 2009464064.
- Floor, Willem (2001). Safavid Government Institutions. Costa Mesa, California: Mazda Publishers. ISBN 978-1568591353.
- Newman, Andrew J. (2008). Safavid Iran: Rebirth of a Persian Empire. I.B.Tauris. pp. 1–281. ISBN 9780857716613.
- Matthee, Rudi (2011). Persia in Crisis: Safavid Decline and the Fall of Isfahan. I.B.Tauris. pp. 1–371. ISBN 978-0857731814.
- Lambton, A.K.S. (1954). "Kirmānshāh". The Encyclopaedia of Islam. BRILL. pp. 167–171. ISBN 9789004060562.
- Matthee, Rudi (1999). The Politics of Trade in Safavid Iran: Silk for Silver, 1600-1730. Cambridge University Press. pp. 1–290. ISBN 0521641314.
- Matthee, Rudi. "ŠAYḴ-ʿALI KHAN ZANGANA". Encyclopaedia Iranica.
- Floor, Willem (2005), "A Note on The Grand Vizierate in Seventeenth Century Persia", Zeitschrift der Deutschen Morgenländischen Gesellschaft, 155 (2), Harrassowitz Verlag: 435–481, JSTOR 43382107
- Matthee, Rudi (1994). "Administrative Stability and Change in Late-17th-Century Iran: The Case of Shaykh Ali Khan Zanganah (1669-89)". International Journal of Middle East Studies. 26 (1): 77–98. doi:10.1017/S0020743800059778. JSTOR 164053.
- Yamaguchi, Akihiko (2023). "Mediating between the Royal Court and the Periphery: The Zangana Family's Brokerage in Safavid Iran (1501–1722)". Iran: Journal of the British Institute of Persian Studies. doi:10.1080/05786967.2023.2170814.

Government offices
Preceded by Mirza Mohammad Mahdi Karaki	Grand Vizier of the Safavid Empire; 1669 - 1689	Succeeded by Mohammad Taher Qazvini
Preceded by Budaq Soltan	Commander of the musketeer corps (tofangchi-aghasi); 1668–1669	Succeeded by Abbas Beg Zanganeh
