= Andrew J. Newman =

Andrew J. Newman holds the chair of Islamic Studies and Persian at the University of Edinburgh.

== Education and career ==
Newman majored in history at Dartmouth College, graduating summa cum laude. He went to the University of California, Los Angeles for graduate study in Islamic studies, and earned his Ph.D. there. After postdoctoral research at Green Templeton College, Oxford, affiliated with Oxford's Wellcome Unit for the History of Medicine, he joined the Department of Islamic and Middle Eastern Studies at the University of Edinburgh in 1996.

== Books ==
Newman's books include:

- The Formative Period of Twelver Shī'ism: Hadīth as Discourse Between Qum and Baghdad (2000)
- Safavid Iran: Rebirth of a Persian Empire (2006)
- Twelver Shiism: Unity and Diversity in the Life of Islam, 632 to 1722 (2013)

His work on Safavid Iran won Iran's Book of the Year Awards for 2007 in the category of Iranian studies.
