= Zangana (tribe) =

Kurdish tribe in Iran and Iraq

Zangana (Kurdish: زەنگەنە, Zengene; Persian: زنگنه) is a large Kurdish tribe mainly living in western Iran and adjacent parts of Iraq. Their native language is Southern Kurdish, and they are religiously divided between Shia Islam, Sunni Islam, and Yarsanism.

== History ==
The first historical mention of the Zangana tribe was by Mu'inoddin Natanzi, who listed them as one of the tribes living in Lur-e-Kuchak. Sharafkhan Bidlisi, in the Sharafnama, listed the Zangana as one of the three main Kurdish tribes of Iran, alongside the Chegini and Siyah Mansur, and claimed that the three tribes descended from three brothers from either Luristan or Guran and Ardalan. He also said that they had really good relations with the Safavid government. After the Sharafnama, there was no more historical mentions of the Zangana tribe until Ahmad Monshi Ghomi mentioned a person named Dawlatyar Khan Zanganeh who was the ruler of Soltaniyeh and the surrounding areas, although it was disputed as most other sources of the time referred to him as Dawlatyar Siyah Mansouri, a leader of the Kurdish Siyah Mansour tribe. The Zangana tribe were also described as native to Kermanshah province.

The Zangana historically were sometimes mislabeled as Lurs due to their proximity, although scholars later clarified that they were Kurds native to the Kermanshah region who first rose to prominence under Shaykh Ali Khan Zangana. The presence of some Zangana Kurds which were settled among the Bakhtiari led some writers to falsely assume that the Zangana were of Bakhtiari origin. The Zangana tribe was one of the most prominent Kurdish tribes in their homeland around Kermanshah. The Zangana tribe also had a presence in Iraq and Khorasan. Sharafkhan also claimed that some Zangana migrated to Afghanistan. Other claims suggested that the Zangana were transferred from the Mosul region to Kermanshah by Sheikh Ali Khan Zangana in 1640.

There were several theories about the origin of the name Zangana, one derived it from Zangay-i Shavaran, a hero in the Shahnameh, while another one derived it from "Zangin", meaning "strong" in Persian. Some suggested a link between the names of Zangana and Zand, one of the Lak tribes, although it was dismissed. There were also claims that the name Zangana came from their homeland, while other claims suggested that the word "Zinna", meaning "alive" or "eternal" in Sorani Kurdish, had evolved into Zangana over time.

The Zangana tribe was initially unknown, although by the time Shah Abbas I was in power, the Zangana tribe had replaced the Kalhor tribe as the most powerful Kurdish tribe in Kermanshah. The Zangana tribe had the support of the Safavid government as it was close with them, while the Kalhor tribe was losing favor after rebellions and sometimes siding with the Ottomans, and had also been weakened due to internal conflict. During the early reign of Shah Abbas, the Zangana tribe was mentioned as being in military service to the Safavids under the command of Abedin Sultan Zanganeh. At the time, the Zangana tribe were likely Shia Muslims or Yarsanis. Akbarali Beg Zangana was appointed as the Mirakhurbashi of Shah Abbas, succeeding Mehdiqoli Beg. In the Safavid period, the Zangana tribe was given governance over parts of Kermanshah, which lasted until the Qajar period, and parts of Khorasan, which only lasted until the end of the Safavid period. The Kalhor were previously the most powerful Kurdish tribe in Kermanshah without support from any government, although their position was replaced by the Zangana tribe in the Safavid period. Shah Abbas II appointed Sheikh Ali Khan Zangana as governor of Kermanshah. Sheikh Ali Khan Zangana was also named as the chief of the Zangana tribe in 1640 by Shah Safi and later served as grand vizier under Shah Soleyman.

Shah Abbas II settled some of the Zangana tribe, including Sheikh Ali Khan Zangana, around Khorasan to defend the border from Uzbeks. During the reign of Shah Soleyman, Hosseinali Khan Zangana, who was governor of Kermanshah, was then appointed governor of the Lur regions of Behbahan and Kohgiluyeh, and some of the Zangana migrated there. Some of the Zangana migrated further to Bushehr and the Fars region. When the Safavids dissolved, and the Ottomans and Afghans invaded Iran, the power and influence of the Zangana tribe also declined. When Nader Shah came to power, some of the Zangana joined him. The Zangana and Kalhor tribes, under Hossein Khan Zangana Haj, recaptured Kermanshah from the Ottomans for Nader Shah, and Nader Shah settled more Zangana in Lorestan. The Zangana tribe also lived in Zohab which was under the Ottomans, who also incited the tribe against Iran, causing Nader Shah to exile some Zangana around Herat and other parts of Khorasan after capturing Zohab from Ahmad Pasha Bajalani. They remained powerful after the fall of the Safavids, with Ibrahim Khan bin Zahir al-Dawla Zangana being appointed sipahsalar of Kurdistan and Feyli Luristan in 1743. During the Safavid period, members of the Zangana tribe were appointed as rulers over the Javanaki in the Bakhtiari region, and they settled there afterwards. Later, Nader Shah forcibly transferred about 2,000 families of the Zangana tribe from the Zohab region to the region between Izeh and Bagh-e-Malek. They integrated among the Bakhtiari tribes and were known as Zangeneh or Kordzangeneh.

The death of Nader Shah Afshar caused more chaos in Iran. When Karim Khan Zand came to power, due to ethnic and cultural similarities, the Zangana and Kalhor tribes were among his biggest allies. Karim Khan Zand was said to have maternal Zangana origins. Under Karim Khan Zand, the Kalhor and Zangana tribes captured the Kermanshah fortress, previously occupied by Arab and Turkmen tribes, and Karim Khan Zand gave the authority in the region to the Kurdish tribal leaders. At the end of the rule of Nader Shah, the Zangana tribe lost Kermanshah and switched their allegiance to Karim Khan Zand, who appointed Allahqoli Khan Zangana as governor of Kermanshah and its surrounding region. The Zand government settled more Zangana in southern Iran around Shiraz to counter the Qashqai and Bakhtiari tribes. Those Zangana were gradually absorbed into the tribal structure of the Qashqai or Bakhtiari tribes they were settled with, and assimilated into their Turkic or Lur cultures, while retaining their name. Some Zangana were exiled to Shiraz for supporting Zulfiqar Khan Afshar, a Zand rebel, against Ali-Morad Khan Zand. Ali Qoli Khan was succeeded by his uncle Haji Ali Khan Zangana as governor of Kermanshah. Agha Mohammad Khan Qajar recognized his governorship, although Fath-Ali Shah Qajar, who stripped local rulers of their positions, installed Mohammad Ali Khan Sham Bayati in his place. Many Zangana abandoned nomadism and began to settle at this time. When Agha Mohammad Khan Qajar came to power, Aliqoli Khan Zangana became the governor of Kermanshah, although he was defeated and killed by Khosrow Khan Ardalan, who transferred the governance of Kermanshah to one of the descendants of Haji ‘Ali Khan Zangana. Some Kalhor leaders had supported Khosrow Khan. Agha Mohammad Khan Qajar targeted the Kurdish tribes which earlier came to the Shiraz region with Karim Khan Zand, and deported them to other parts of Iran. The Zangana were among them. In 1830, a Kurdish cavalry of the Zangana and Kalhor tribes, under Muhammad Husayn Mirza Hishmat al-Dawla, the governor of Kermanshah, clashed with the Bakhtiari Lurs under Hisam al-Saltana.

The Zangana tribe were specifically targeted by the Ba'athist Iraqi government. The Talabani family, founded by Mullah Mahmud in the late 18th century, was part of the Zangana tribe. It also included Jalal Talabani.

The Zangana tribe spoke the Zangana dialect of Southern Kurdish which was very close to the dialect spoken by the Kalhor and Sanjabi tribes. Some Zangana in Iraq spoke Gorani, and their Gorani variety was also called Zangana. They were still a Kurdish tribe despite speaking a non-Kurdish language. Nevertheless, many of the Zangana in Iraq who spoke Gorani later shifted to Sorani. In Kermanshah, the Kalhor and Zangana tribes were two major factors behind the Kurdification of the Guran and their language shift from Gorani to Southern Kurdish. The Zangana tribe in Iran was divided into the Chubin, Pashayi, and Sabzewari clans, and mostly followed Shia Islam. In Iraq, the Zangana tribe was divided into the Faris Agha and Rustam Agha clans, and mostly folllwed Sunni Islam although some followed Yarsanism. There were also pockets of Arabized Zangana in Iraq. The Zangana tribe mainly lived in the provinces of Kermanshah and Ilam in Iran, and Kirkuk, Khanaqin, Kifri, and Sulaymaniyah in Iraq.

== See also ==
- Zand (tribe)
- Bajalan (tribe)
