= Mohammad Beg =

Safavid Grand Vizier from 1654 to 1661

Grand Vizier of the Safavid Empire
- In office 1654 – 25 January 1661
- Monarch: Shah Abbas II
- Preceded by: Khalifeh Soltan
- Succeeded by: Mirza Mohammad Karaki

Personal details
- Died: 1672 Safavid Iran
- Parent: Hoseyn Beg Tabrizi (father)

Mohammad Beg (Persian: محمد بیگ; died 1672) was the grand vizier of the Safavid ruler Shah Abbas II (r. 1642–1666) from 1654 to 1661. He belonged to a family of Armenian tailors, who had originally served as gholams (slave soldiers).

== Origins ==
Mohammad Beg was born in Tabriz to an Armenian family, which originally served as a gholam (slave soldier) of the Safavid dynasty of Iran, but later became tailors. Mohammad Beg's father was Hoseyn Beg Tabrizi, who served as the court master tailor (qaychachi-bashi) during the reign of Shah Safi (r. 1629–1642).

== Biography ==
Map of Safavid Iran and its divisions in 1660

Mohammad Beg is first mentioned in 1643, when he was appointed as the city prefect of New Julfa, a quarter in the Safavid capital of Isfahan, which was populated by Armenians. During this period, Mohammad Beg was supported by another officer of Armenian origin named Allahverdi Khan (not be confused with the powerful military officer Allahverdi Khan, who was of Georgian origin).

In 1646, Mohammad Beg was appointed as the port-master/harbourmaster (shahbandar) of Bandar Abbas. Two years later, he was appointed as the "controller of assay" (mo'ayyer al-mamalek). With the help of Allahverdi Khan, Mohammad Beg became the steward of the royal household (nazer-e boyutat) in 1651, thus succeeding Mohammad Ali Beg. One year later, Mohammad Beg was appointed as the governor of Kohgiluyeh. However, during the same year, Mohammad Beg's relations with Allahverdi Khan became bad, and the two became rivals.

In 1654, Mohammad Beg was appointed by shah Shah Abbas II as his grand vizier. One of his first acts was dismissing the Georgian prefect of Isfahan, Parsadan Gorgijanidze, due to his unpopularity among the inhabitants of the city. Mohammad Beg also had the empire more centralized by converting more land into the crown domain (Hamadan in 1654, Ardabil in 1656/7, Semnan in 1656/7 and Kerman in 1658).

In 1661, Mohammad Beg, after having failed to diminish the power of his rivals, was forced to resign from the grand vizier office. He was then exiled to Qom. In 1672, shah Suleiman I (r. 1666–1694) offered Mohammad Beg to become grand vizier once again, which he agreed to, but while on his way to Isfahan, he died. According to the French traveler Jean Chardin, Mohammad Beg had been poisoned by Suleiman's grand vizier Shaykh Ali Khan Zanganeh.

== Family ==
Mohammad Beg had a son named Amin Beg, who would later serve as the mo'ayyer al-mamalek in Isfahan. Mohammad Beg's two brothers, Ughan Beg and Hoseyn Beg, both served as the shahbandar of Bandar Abbas. Their uncle, Shamshir Beg, also served in the office, and was succeeded by Mohammad Beg's cousin Isa Khan Beg. When Mohammad Beg was appointed as the nazer-e boyutat in 1651, he gave his previous office, mo'ayyer al-mamalek, to one of his other brother, Hasan Beg. Furthermore, when Mohammad Beg was appointed grand vizier, he appointed Hasan Beg as the qaychachi-bashi.

Furthermore, one of Mohammad Beg's nephews served as the vizier of the governor of Gilan. During most of the reign of Abbas II, all of silver and silk commerce was controlled by the family of Mohammad Beg.

== Sources ==
- Blow, David (2009). Shah Abbas: The Ruthless King Who became an Iranian Legend. London, UK: I.B. Tauris & Co. Ltd. ISBN 978-1-84511-989-8. LCCN 2009464064.
- Matthee, Rudi (2011). Persia in Crisis: Safavid Decline and the Fall of Isfahan. I.B.Tauris. pp. 1–371. ISBN 978-0857731814.
- Babaie, Sussan (2004). Slaves of the Shah: New Elites of Safavid Iran. I.B.Tauris. pp. 1–218. ISBN 9781860647215.
- Matthee, Rudi (2010). "ḴALIFA SOLṬĀN". Encyclopaedia Iranica, Vol. XV, Fasc. 4. pp. 382–384.
- Matthee, Rudi (1991), "The Career of Mohammad Beg, Grand Vizier of Shah 'Abbas II (r. 1642-1666)", Iranian Studies, vol. 24, Cambridge: Routledge, pp. 17–36, doi:10.1080/00210869108701755, ISBN 978-0-521-20093-6, JSTOR 4310753
- Newman, Andrew J. (2008). Safavid Iran: Rebirth of a Persian Empire. I.B.Tauris. pp. 1–281. ISBN 9780857716613.
- Savory, Roger (2007). Iran under the Safavids. Cambridge University Press. pp. 1–288. ISBN 978-0521042512.
- Roemer, H.R. (1986). "The Safavid period". The Cambridge History of Iran, Volume 5: The Timurid and Safavid periods. Cambridge: Cambridge University Press. pp. 189–351. ISBN 9780521200943.

Government offices
Unknown	Controller of assay (Mo'ayyer al-mamalek); 1648–1654	Succeeded by Hasan Beg
Preceded by Mohammad Ali Beg	Steward of the royal household (Nazer-e Boyutat); 1651–1654	Succeeded by Safi Qoli Beg
Preceded by Khalifeh Sultan	Grand vizier of Safavid Iran; 1654–1661	Succeeded by Mirza Mohammad Mahdi Karaki
