= Mirza Sayyed Hasan =

Mirza Sayyed Hasan (Persian: میرزا سید حسن, romanized: Mirzā Seyyed Hasan; b. 25 January 1655, Isfahan – before 27 December 1715) was a Safavid prince. He was the son of the high-ranking Iranian statesman Khalifeh Sultan, and the Safavid princess Khan-Agha Begum. In 1632, Mirza Sayyed, together with the rest of his three brothers, were blinded by Shah Safi (r. 1629–1642), who feared that his place was in danger from other Safavid royal members. Because of this, Mirza Sayyed was not able to occupy any post. He did, however, become one of the most dominant ulama of his time. At an unknown date, he married the Safavid princess Zobeydeh Khanum, who was the daughter of Shah Suleiman I (r. 1666–1694), and the sister of the later Shah Sultan Husayn (r. 1694–1722). Hasan and Khanum werer the parents of Mirza Mohammad Baqer and Mir Sayyed Morteza, who both served as the sadr-i khasseh and sadr-i mamalik under their cousin Sultan Husayn.

== Sources ==
- Matthee, Rudi (2010). "ḴALIFA SOLṬĀN". Encyclopaedia Iranica, Vol. XV, Fasc. 4. pp. 382–384.
- Floor, Willem (2005), "A Note on The Grand Vizierate in Seventeenth Century Persia", Zeitschrift der Deutschen Morgenländischen Gesellschaft, 155 (2), Harrassowitz Verlag: 435–481, JSTOR 43382107
