= Maryam Begum (1640–1719) =

Safavid princess

Maryam Begum (Persian: مریم بیگم; 18th-century) was a daughter of Shah Safi (r. 1629–1642) of the Safavid Empire.

She was a sister of Shah Abbas II (r. 1642–1666).

She had great influence over the affairs of state during the final years of Shah Soleiman's reign (r. 1666–1694) and, in particular, throughout the reign of his successor, Soltan Hoseyn (r. 1694–1722).
