= Abbas II of Persia =

Safavid Shah of Iran from 1642 to 1666

Abbas II
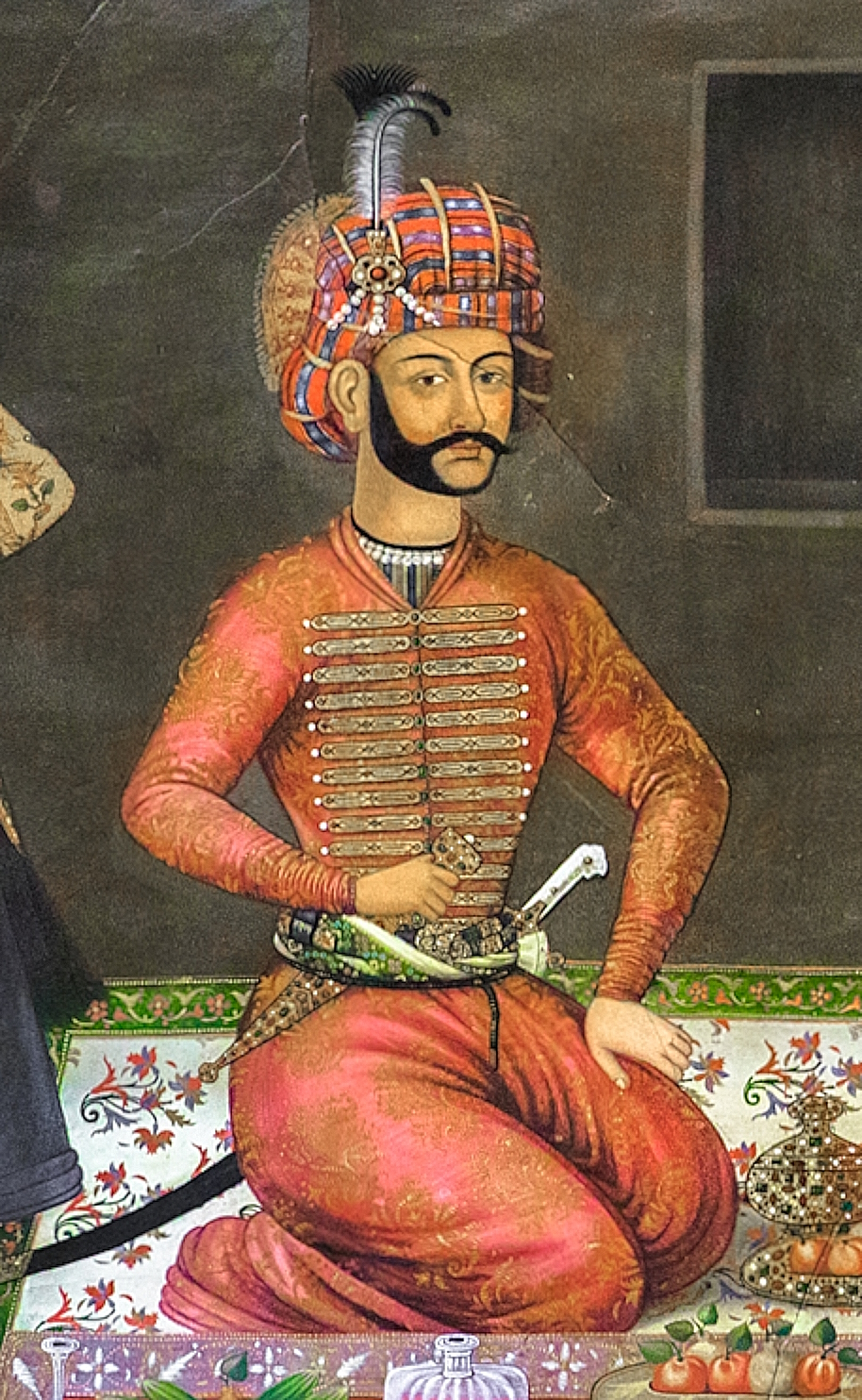
- Contemporary portrait of Abbas II of Persia. Frescoe painted circa 1650 in the Palace of Chehel Sotoun, Isfahan.

Shah of Iran
- Reign: 15 May 1642 – 26 October 1666
- Coronation: 15 May 1642 in Kashan
- Predecessor: Safi I
- Successor: Suleiman I
- Born: Soltan Mohammad Mirza; 30 August 1632; Qazvin, Safavid Iran
- Died: 26 October 1666 (aged 34); Behshahr, Safavid Iran
- Burial: Fatima Masumeh Shrine, Qom, Iran
- Spouse: Nakihat Khanum; Princess Anuka
- Issue: Suleiman I; Hamza Mirza
- Dynasty: Safavid
- Father: Safi I
- Mother: Anna Khanum
- Religion: Twelver Shia Islam
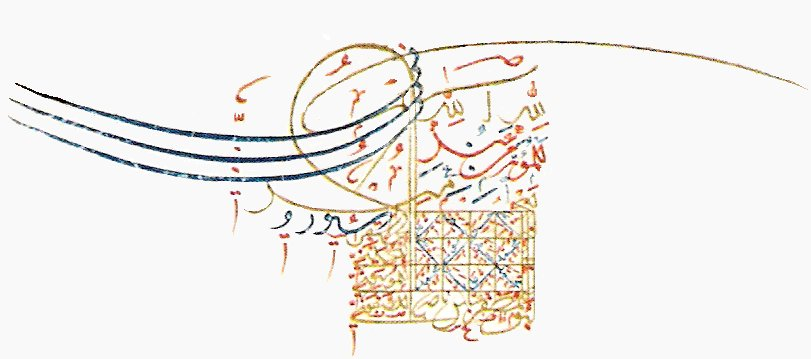
- Tughra

Abbas II (Persian: عباس دوم, romanized: ʿAbbās II; born Soltan Mohammad Mirza; 30 August 1632 – 26 October 1666) was the seventh Shah of Safavid Iran, ruling from 1642 to 1666. As the eldest son of Safi and his Circassian wife, Anna Khanum, he inherited the throne when he was nine, and had to rely on a regency led by Saru Taqi, the erstwhile grand vizier of his father, to govern in his place. During the regency, Abbas received formal kingly education that, until then, he had been denied. In 1645, at age thirteen, he was able to remove Saru Taqi from power, and after purging the bureaucracy ranks, asserted his authority over his court and began his absolute rule.

Abbas II's reign was marked by peace and progress. He intentionally avoided a war with the Ottoman Empire and his relations with the Uzbeks in the east were friendly. He enhanced his reputation as a military commander by leading his army during the war with the Mughal Empire and successfully recovering the city of Kandahar. At his behest, Rostom Khan, the King of Kartli and a Safavid vassal, invaded the Kingdom of Kakheti in 1648 and sent the rebellious monarch Teimuraz I into exile. In 1651, Teimuraz tried to reclaim his lost crown with the support of the Russian Tsardom, but the Russians were defeated by Abbas' army in a short conflict fought between 1651 and 1653. The war's major event was the destruction of the Russian fortress on the Iranian side of the Terek river. Abbas also suppressed a rebellion led by the Georgians between 1659 and 1660, in which he acknowledged Vakhtang V as the king of Kartli, but had the rebel leaders executed.

From the middle years of his reign onwards, Abbas was occupied with a financial decline which would plague the realm until the end of the Safavid dynasty. In order to increase revenues, in 1654 Abbas appointed Mohammad Beg, a distinguished economist. However, he was unable to overcome the economic decline. Mohammad Beg's efforts often damaged the treasury. He took bribes from the Dutch East India Company and assigned his family members into various positions. In 1661, Mohammad Beg was replaced by Mirza Mohammad Karaki, a weak and ineffective administrator. He was excluded from the shah's private affairs in the inner palace, to the point that he was ignorant about the existence of Sam Mirza, the future Suleiman and the next Safavid shah of Iran.

Abbas II died on 25 September 1666, aged thirty-four. Described by modern historians as the last strong king of the Safavid dynasty, he stood out from his father and his successors by being persistently concerned for state affairs. A king known for his sense of justice, Western historians and observers often portrayed him as a magnanimous and tolerant monarch who ruled a kingdom which was free of rebellions and relatively safe to travel within. Some historians have criticised him for acts of cruelty similar to his father and forcing conversion upon the Iranian Jews, but most have noted his tolerance towards Christians. After the fall of the Safavid dynasty in 1722, he is remembered as a forceful ruler who temporarily reversed the decline of the Safavid state and created a period of prosperity, stability and peace that with his death ended once and for all.

== Background ==
The Safavid dynasty rose to power in 1501, when Ismail I took the city of Tabriz from the Aq Qoyunlu Turkomans and proclaimed himself the Shah of Iran. He was succeeded by his son, Tahmasp I, whose reign saw the long Ottoman-Safavid war of 1532–1555. He was able to safeguard his father's empire from collapsing even though he lost lands in Mesopotamia to the Ottomans. Tahmasp established a new polity for the Safavid state; he decreased the Qizilbash influence on the Iranian bureaucracy. (Note: Qizilbash were the Shi'ia Turkoman tribes who worshiped Ismail I as Messiah and steadfastly followed him through his wars.) He developed a "third force" containing Georgian and Armenian slaves who he brought from Caucasus to reduce the Turkoman and the Iranian influence in the court.

Tahmasp died in 1576 after a long reign. He did not choose any of his thirteen sons as his heir by the time of death, thus paving the way for civil war. Eventually, his second born son, Ismail II, became the king with the support of the majority of the Qizilbash tribes after his brother, Haydar Mirza, was eliminated. Ismail II's reign has been defined by two major events — his policy of remaking Sunnism the official religion of Iran, and his paranoia that led him to kill most of the royal family. He died after a short reign in 1577 after consuming poisoned opium, a supposed plot by his sister, Pari Khan Khanum and the Qizilbash leaders.

Ismail II was succeeded by his blind brother, Mohammad Khodabanda, whose reign was one of continuous instability. In 1578, the Ottomans declared war on the weakened Safavid state and conquered the Safavid lands in the Caucasus and even managed to seize most of Azerbaijan. Mohammad Khodabanda was overthrown by his youngest son Abbas I in 1587. Abbas I projected great military power, regained most of the lands lost by his predecessors, and adopted a set of forward-looking policies designed to optimise military strength, centralise state control, and expand Iran's internal and international commercial scope. He paired ruthlessness with justice and dealt harshly with threats to his power, while remaining in touch with his people. All these qualities eventually entitled him to be styled as Abbas the Great.

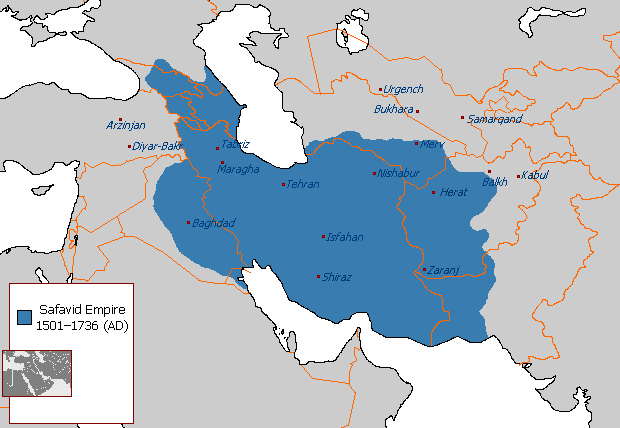
Safavid Empire at its greatest extent during the reign of Abbas I.

The course of territory changes and the ultimate borders of Safavid Empire during the reign of Safi I (r. 1629 – 1642).

Abbas the Great was succeeded by his grandson, Safi. A reclusive and passive character, Safi was unable to fill the power vacuum which his grandfather had left behind. His officials undermined his authority and revolts constantly broke out across the realm. The continuing war with the Ottoman Empire, started with initial success during Abbas the Great's reign, but ended with the humiliating defeat of Iran and the Treaty of Zuhab, which returned much of Iran's conquests in Mesopotamia to the Ottomans.

In order to assert his authority, Safi purged every potential claimant to his throne, including the sons of the Safavid princesses, and the sons of Abbas the Great, who were blinded and thus were unqualified to rule. The purge also saw the deaths of the leading figures of the realm. An example of Safi's cruelty occurred on the night of 20 February 1632, also known as the Bloody Ma'bas (named after Ma'bas), in which he had forty women of the harem put to death. The last act of his bloodshed was the killing of his grand vizier, Mirza Taleb Khan Ordubadi, who was replaced with a gholam (military slave) named Mirza Mohammad Taqi Khan, more famously known as Saru Taqi.

As a eunuch, Saru Taqi had access to the royal harem, and used this ability to forge relations with the shah's concubines. He influenced Safi, persuading him to increase the crown domains (khasseh) by incorporating the Fars province into it. He imposed heavy taxes throughout the realm, especially on Isfahan's Armenian population, and investigated the revenue flows of the previous governor of Gilan. He was described as greedy and was accused by Western observers of accepting bribes. In 1634, Saru Taqi appointed his brother, Mohammad Saleh Beg, as the governor of Mazandaran to counteract the Mar'ashi Sayyid line. Saru Taqi's family held the province's governorship until the end of Safi's reign.

Safi died from excessive drinking on 12 May 1642, leaving behind a country smaller than it was when he inherited it. A weak-minded man lacking charisma, Safi manifested many problems that later plagued the Safavid empire during its decline, one of them being not preparing the crown prince for rule. He excluded the Qizilbash influence in Safavid bureaucracy, and instead allowed a coalition of concubines, eunuchs and gholams to hold power during the last decade of his reign.

== Ascension and regency ==
According to a report by the Dutch East India Company (VOC), Soltan Mohammad Mirza was born on 30 August 1632 in Qazvin. (Note: Another birth date suggestion is 5 January 1633 which was discovered through a chronogram in the formula of ‘kalb-i āstān-i amīr al-muʾminīn’ (the dog (the servant) of the amir al-mu'minin (Ali)).) The eldest son of Safi of Persia and Anna Khanum, he grew up in the royal harem, surrounded by women and eunuchs, and was tutored by Rajab Ali Tabrizi. His mother, a Circassian concubine, only gained political standing in the harem and thus distinguish herself from other nameless concubines because she had produced the shah's male heir. Saru Taqi had a close relationship with Anna Khanum, as observed by travellers such as Jean Chardin. He was an agent and confidant to her, and the queen mother ruled the realm through him upon Mohammad Mirza's ascension.

Safi sought to have Mohammad Mirza and his brothers blinded, but thanks to the sympathy of a eunuch whose job was to blind the princes, Mohammad Mirza retained his sight by feigning blindness. He did this until the end of his father's reign. This deception partly explains why he was still illiterate at the age of ten.

On 15 May 1642, aged nine-and-a-half, the young prince ascended the throne, four days after the death of Safi, and following a meeting of the state council organised by Saru Taqi. At his coronation ceremony, Mohammad Mirza adopted the regnal name Abbas, and issued a tax remission of 500,000 tomans, in addition to a ban on the consumption of alcoholic drinks. The grand vizier maintained his position in a smooth transition of power, later removing rivals such as Rustam Bek, an influential Georgian figure during Safi's reign, to consolidate his grip on power. Abbas, until now secluded from the outer world (as had his father), was sent to Qazvin to be educated as a king; the quick progress he made enabled him to be introduced to the religious texts. Abbas forged a lifelong interest in theology; this may have been the result of his reading a new Persian translation of Al-Kafi. In addition to his studies (on a variety of subjects), the shah also learned riding, archery, polo and other equestrian games.

Throughout the first years of his reign, a coalition of Saru Taqi, Jani Beg Khan Shamlu, the qurchi-bashi (Note: The head of the qurchis (the loyal bodyguards of the shah).) and Mohammad Beg, a statesman and the future grand vizier, effectively ruled Iran. In addition, Saru Taqi and Jani Khan had a family alliance through the marriage of Mirza Qasem, the former's nephew, to the daughter of Jani Khan. However, this alliance did not save the grand vizier from assassination. On 11 October 1645 Jani Khan and five other conspirators attacked and murdered him on his house. Jani Khan had over time implanted in Abbas' mind the idea that Saru Taqi was driving the realm into ruin and posed a threat to the shah himself. He murdered Saru Taqi by the authority of the shah. His death gave the shah the confidence to assert his authority over the court; that year he purged the ranks of bureaucracy just as his father had done. According to Dutch observers, Abbas's purge was no less bloody than Safi's purge, with between 8,000 and 10,000 people killed in the aftermath of Saru Taqi's assassination. One of the victims was Jani Khan, who was poisoned by the royal sommelier, Safi Quli Beg. Jani Khan's death was endorsed by Anna Khanum who, saddened by Saru Taqi's death, also ordered the purge of Jani Khan's tribe, the Shamlu.

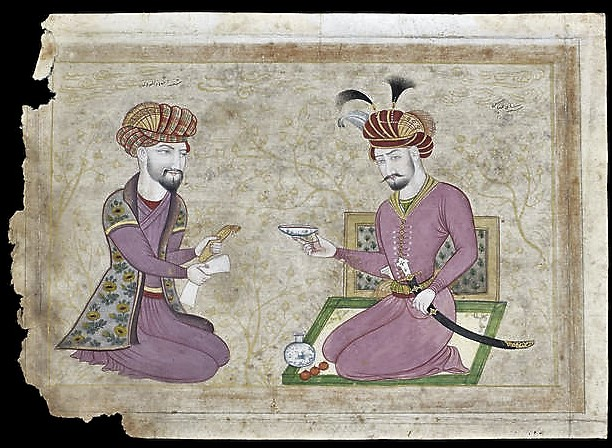
Abbas II (right) and a minister. 19th-century Indian artwork made after a Safavid original

In need of a regent, Abbas called for Khalifeh Soltan to serve him as the grand vizier. Khalifeh Soltan had been the grand vizier to both Abbas the Great and Safi, from 1623 to 1632. The first cleric to become the grand vizier, he was concerned with enacting the sharia, but only succeeded in the matter of prohibiting visual misrepresentations of the religious law. Even then, he could never eliminate the widespread habit of drinking wine, only partially controlling the habit by imposing harsh penalties. One of his more successful policies was the banning of prostitution. By his insistence, Abbas issued a firman, in which he prohibited public prostitution, although prostitutes were still allowed to work in their clients' houses.

The death of Saru Taqi and the appointment of Khalifeh Soltan has often been considered the point when Abbas began his absolute rule and ended his regency. At the age of thirteen, the shah was more energetically involved in government than ever his father had been. One of his methods to consolidate his power was centralisation. He confiscated Saru Taqi's familial lands as his personal estates and throughout his reign also incorporated other cities such as Hamadan, Ardabil and Kerman into the crown domain.

== Reign ==
=== War for Kandahar ===
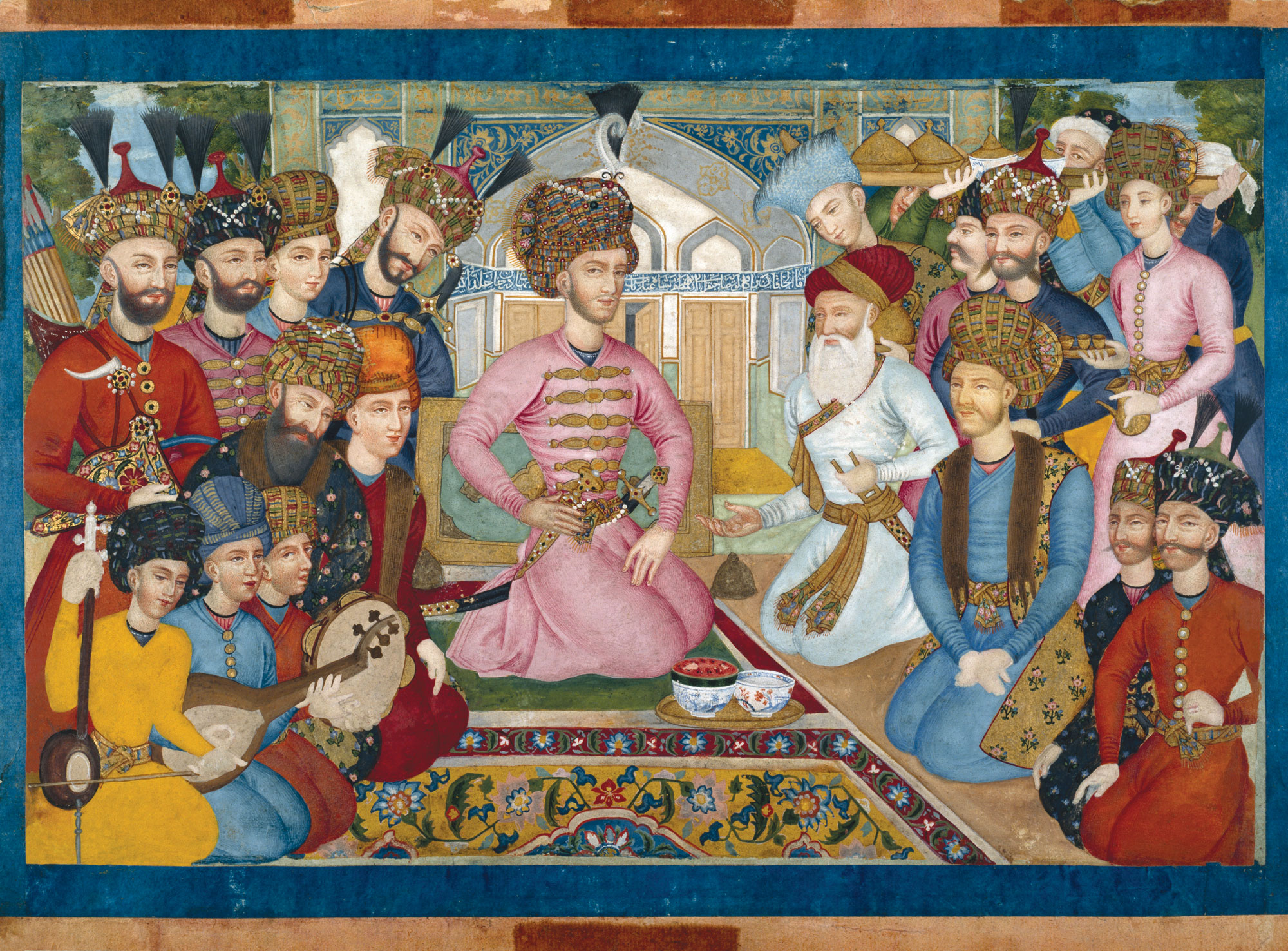
A painting of Abbas II while negotiating with the Mughal ambassador. Attributed to Abu'l Hasan Ghaffari Mustawfi Kashani, Shiraz, circa 1780-94.

Abbas' reign was predominantly peaceful; the shah preferred to keep the peace with the Ottoman Empire and overall did not start a conflict with his neighbouring nations except for a war with the Mughal Empire in 1649 to recover the city of Kandahar. Kandahar had been surrendered to the Mughal emperor, Shah Jahan, by the city's governor, Ali Mardan Khan in the Fall of Kandahar (1638). In his later years Safi intended to muster an army and retake the city. However, his death halted a potential war. When Shah Jahan sought to advance into Transoxiana in early 1647, he sent an envoy to the Safavid court, and after negotiations, Abbas agreed not to invade Kandahar while Shah Jahan proceeded with his military campaign.

In 1648, Shah Jahan catastrophically failed to conquer Samarkand, the ancestral Timurid capital. Seeing the favourable turn of events, the powerful factions of the court encouraged Abbas to launch a campaign to reconquer Kandahar. Abbas instantly took command of 50,000 men and marched towards Kandahar via Afghanistan. The shah's army reached the city's outskirts in January 1649, and after two months of fighting, took the possession of the city's strongholds and the areas around it. During the siege, the Iranian army was demoralised by oppressive commanders, lack of pay, and substandard accommodation, and thus suffered great losses. The Safavid army under Abbas was poorly equipped and underfed. Many of his soldiers deserted during the march from Afghanistan, and the fact that the Safavid army could nevertheless reconquer the city owed more to the weak political standing of the Mughals rather than the strength of the Safavids.

The Mughals did not hesitate to send a relief force; the first of which was a counter-attack led by Prince Aurangzeb which proved ineffectual. Two years later, Shah Jahan himself set out to retake Kandahar with an army fully equipped with war elephants and canons. However, his effort proved in vain, and after four months of a siege of the city, he had to retreat because of the approaching cold season. The last Mughal attempt to take Kandahar was in 1653, when Prince Dara Shikoh led an army which prompted Abbas to mobilise his men. However, a growing financial crisis hampered Abbas's efforts. Even then, the Mughal army struggled to sustain the siege with their medium-sized guns being insufficient for an effective siege. The organisational problems, along with a lack of military resolve, led their expedition to fail. Kandahar thus remained in Iranian hands until an Afghan revolt in 1709.

=== The northern frontiers ===
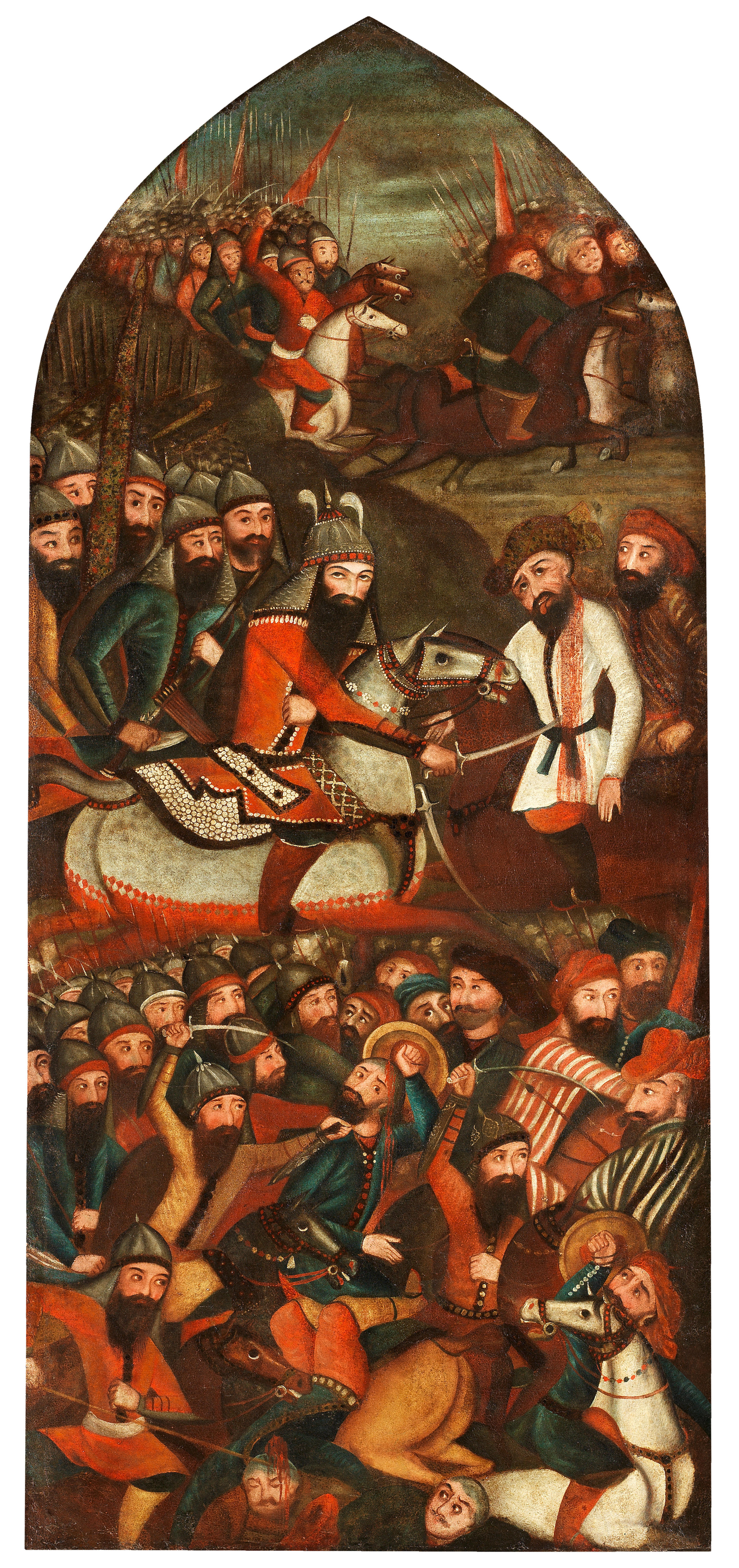
Early 19th century painting from the Qajar era, perhaps anachronistically depicting the Safavid victory over the Russian forces in 1651–1653

The main conflict in Georgia during Abbas' reign was between Teimuraz I and Rostom of Kartli. Teimuraz I was the king of Kakheti and Kartli. He followed an anti-Safavid policy and was eager to break the Iranian dominance over his realm. In 1633, with the support of Safi, Rostom Khan proclaimed himself the King of Karteli and invaded Teimuraz's lands. Teimuraz remained the King of Kakheti and organised insurgencies across Rostom's borders until 1648, when at the behest of Abbas, Rostom invaded Kakheti and sent Teimuraz into exile. In 1659, Rostom died and the crown of Kartli became vacant. Abbas sought to settle the Qizilbash tribes in the Georgian region, a measure that incited a major rebellion known as the Bakhtrioni uprising. The rebels, led by Zaal, Duke of Aragvi, organised an alliance between the Georgian forces against the common enemy and attacked the Iranian fortresses of Bakhtrioni and Alaverdi, successfully driving out the Qizilbash tribes. Trying to reach a compromise, Abbas decided not to settle the Qizilbash tribes in Georgia. He acknowledged Vakhtang V, the adopted son of Rostom, as King of Kartli, but also had the rebel leaders executed. To achieve a reconciliation with the Georgians, Abbas later married Vakhtang's daughter, Anuka.

During Abbas' reign, Iran's sphere of influence over Caucasus clashed with that of the Russians. From 1646, the Tsardom of Russia began undermining the rights of foreign merchants who delivered silk via Iran to Sweden, and in 1649, the Russian government issued a new policy of economic regulations known as Sobornoye Ulozheniye, which further curtailed foreigners' rights. In his early years, Abbas sought to decrease interactions with the Russians and dismissed the Russian officials for their renewed anti-Ottomanism. Between 1647 and 1653 tension increased over a series of caravan robberies, and detention of Russian merchants from Iran.

These tensions led to a small conflict between 1651 and 1653, during which the Russians tried to expand their territories south to the Terek river which the Safavids considered as part of their realm. The Russians attempted to build a fortress for Teimuraz, the deposed King of Kakheti, who had turned to them for aid. When Abbas learned of this, he decided to act against them, while being simultaneously preoccupied with his campaign in Kandahar. The forces of Ardabil, Karabakh, and Astara massed under the leadership of Khosrow Soltan, a gholam of Armenian origin, and attacked the fortress. They successfully drove out the Russians and destroyed their base. After this, negotiations over outstanding issues would continue for ten years, with couriers going back and forth between Moscow and Isfahan.

=== Financial decline ===
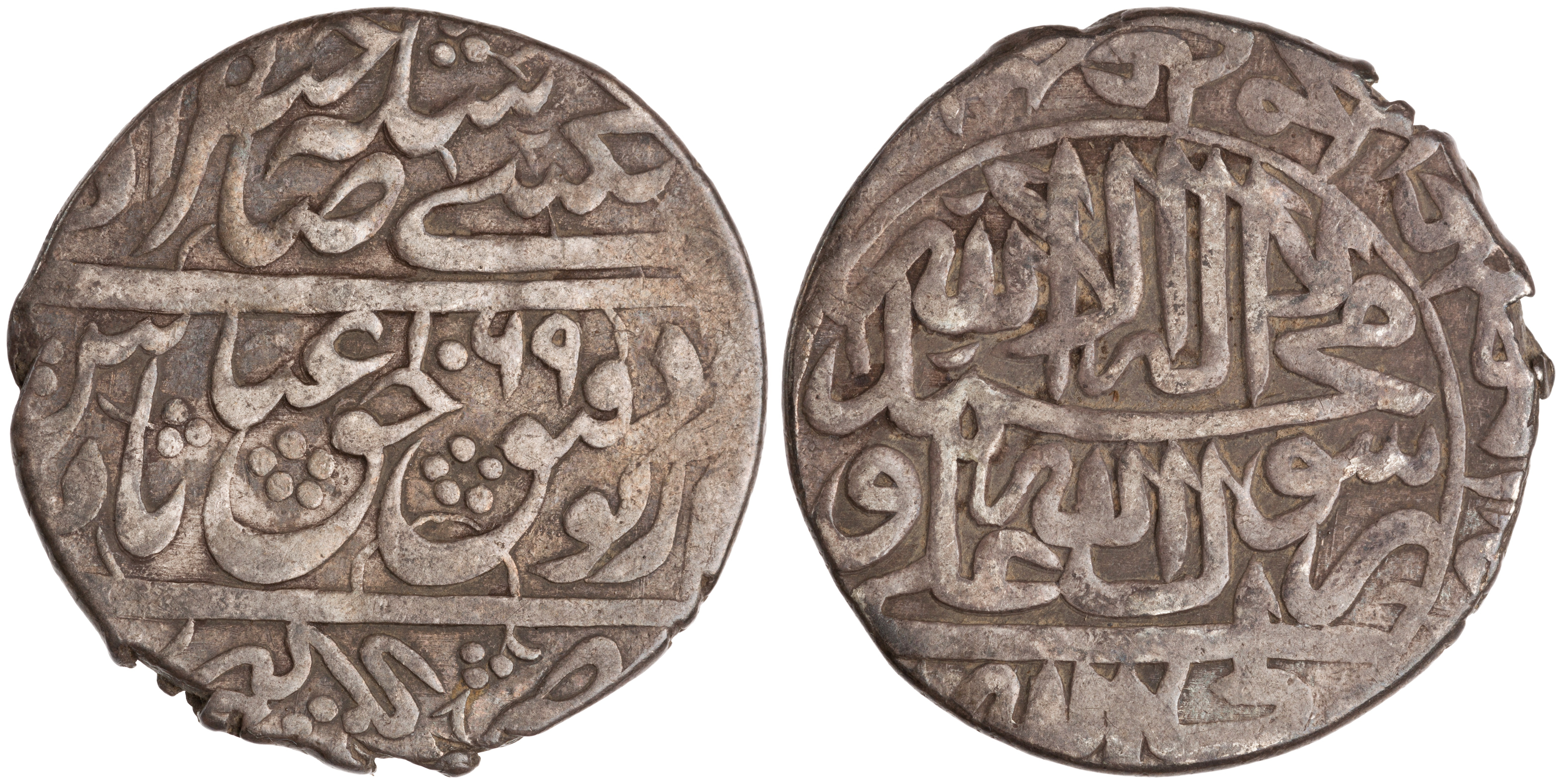
Silver coin of Abbas II, dated 1658/9 and struck at the Ganja mint. As a part of his plan to increase the state's revenue, the grand vizier Mohammad Beg had the gold coins prohibited, therefore flooding the realm with silver coins.

Khalifeh Soltan had found an adversary in the master of the hunt, Allahverdi Khan, an Armenian gholam and the childhood friend of Abbas, who had risen quickly up the ranks of the bureaucracy, first becoming the master of the hunt and then, the qurchi-bashi in 1649. By the early 1650s, Allahverdi was the shah's favourite, and he used his influence over the shah to endorse a grand vizier after Khalifeh Soltan died in 1654. Thanks to Allahverdi's recommendation, Abbas appointed Mohammad Beg, an Armenian by origin, and the intendant-general of the court. Mohammad Beg's tenure saw an economic decline, mainly caused by Abbas' costly campaign to Kandahar and the scarcity of raw materials for the silk trade. Notwithstanding his long-standing economical experience, Mohammad Beg could not come up with a solution to the excessive expenditures by the court and the expensive investment on the army. He drove the state's income into a further decline by enhancing centralisation, a process that could not be supported by New Julfa's trade network. Regarding the army, Mohammad Beg discontinued the position of sipahsalar to prevent a salary cost he considered unnecessary and he eliminated the artillery department. Mohammad Beg also sought to sell the mansions Abbas had confiscated. According to Jean Chardin, the shah had more than 137 of these mansions in Isfahan alone. However, no one bought them, so Mohammad Beg's scheme failed. He also prohibited the usage of gold coins to the point where the state was flooded with silver coinage.

Perhaps the most imaginative and catastrophic of Mohammad Beg's measures was his plan to unlock and harness some of the realm's natural resources. He made an effort to mine deposits of precious metals in the vicinity of Isfahan, and he employed a self-styled French expert named, Chapelle de Han, whose proved to be a fraud. He also tried to expand coal mining, but this was another fruitless attempt. All of these failures, along with his nepotism towards his family, made Mohammad Beg a hated figure among the courtiers. Nonetheless, despite his numerous adversaries, he survived and went as far as getting a monopoly over state affairs, including access to the harem, from the shah. Abbas took to spending most of his time either in the inner palace or hunting or drinking parties, while Mohammad Beg hid unpleasant news from him. Ultimately, Mohammad Beg fell from the shah's grace thanks to the efforts of his initial supporter, Allahverdi Khan, who informed Abbas of Mohammad Beg's lies and deceptions. The shah exiled Mohammad Beg to Qom on 19 January 1661. Mohammad Beg's dismissal was widely seen as a loss by the Dutch East India Company who enjoyed exporting gold secretly through Iran's trade routes by bribing Mohammad Beg to keep this activity quiet.

=== Death ===
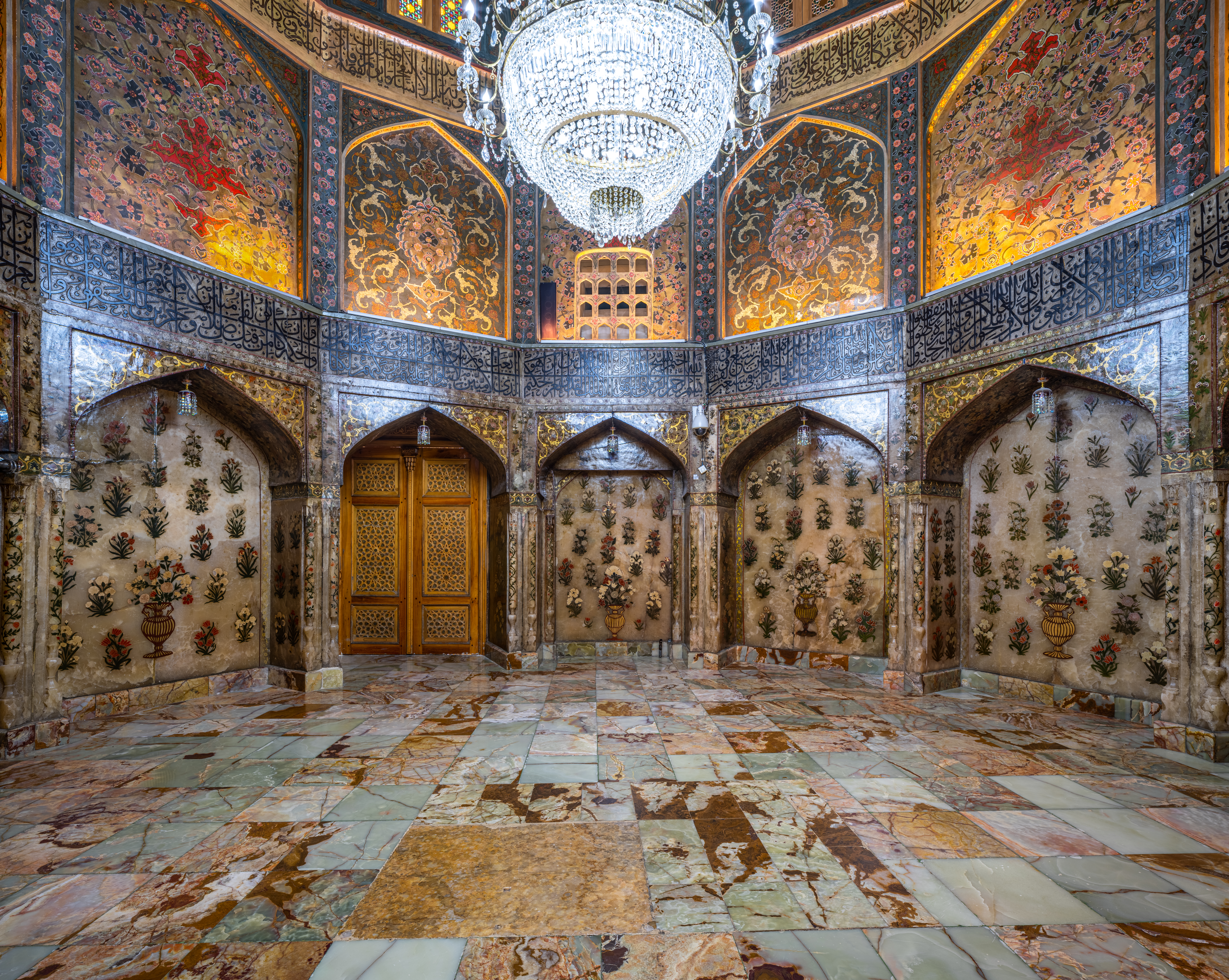
Abbas II's tomb in Fatima Masumeh Shrine

In 1661, Abbas appointed Mirza Mohammad Karaki as his fourth and last grand vizier. Karaki had previously performed satisfactorily as the sadr-i mamalik (minister of religion) and was a member of the prestigious Karaki family that traced its line back to Shaykh Ali al-Karaki, the deputy of the Hidden Imam for Tahmasp I. He was described as a man of inaction, sluggish and impractical, and a puppet of a faction in court. His tenure saw the promotion of trade via the overland route to the Levant. He made an effort to investigate the ongoing specie problem that Mohammad Beg had left behind. However, he was caught up in a domestic crisis. In 1663, he had the qurchi-bashi Murtaza Quli Khan Qajar decapitated and tempted the shah to also execute his successor. Overall, Karaki had a lesser influence over the shah than his predecessor. During his tenure, Abbas spent more time in the inner palace and kept the grand vizier ignorant of his private affairs. Karaki did not even know that the shah had a son named Sam Mirza.

During the last decade of his reign, Abbas withdrew from state affairs to engage in sexual activities and drinking parties. At first, his persistent drinking did not seem to have affects on his governing, but slowly it got the better of him. He threw luxurious parties and, after these parties, hid from the public for two or three weeks. Eventually, on 26 October 1666, while in his winter town, Behshahr, Abbas II died of various debilities and illnesses, including syphilis, and throat cancer, a result of his excessive drinking. He was buried in Qom and was succeeded by his eldest son, Sam Mirza, whose mother was a Georgian concubine named Nakihat Khanum. Abbas had two sons. He reportedly favoured his younger son Hamza Mirza, whose mother was a Circassian concubine.

== Policies ==
=== Religion ===
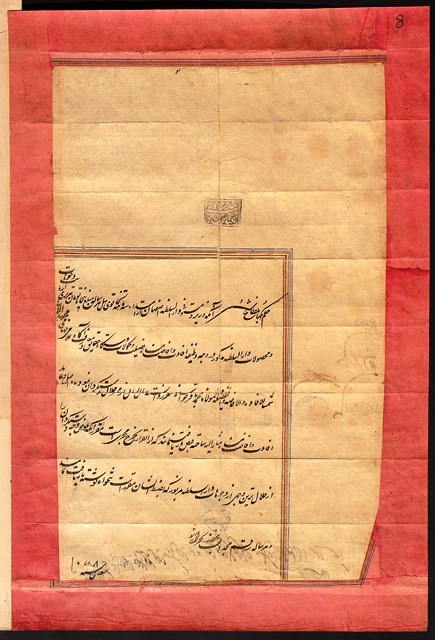
A royal firman of Abbas II granting pension to the Shi'ia scholar, Mohammad Bagher Sabzevari

Abbas II's reign shows great paradox in regard of the treatment of non Shi`is. He commissioned the Shi'ia jurisprudence works to be translated into Persian, and consulted the ulama on these taxes. He maintained friendly relations with the renowned Shi'ia scholars of his time such as Mohsen Fayz Kashani, Mohammad Bagher Sabzevari and Mohammad Taqi Majlesi (the father of Mohammad-Baqer Majlesi). Yet, he was not a zealous Shiite. The shah paid his respects to his ancestral Sufi order, the Safaviyya, built lodges in the order's most holy city, Ardabil, and engaged in discussions with Sufis. However, the persecution of Sufis increased greatly during his reign and anti-Sufi writings by Shi'ia scholars such as Mir Lawhi and Muhammad Tahir Qummi rose in number. Abu Muslim, who was often seen as a messianic figure by the population, was targeted by Shi'ia essayists during Khalifeh Soltan's tenure, one of them being Ahmad ibn Muhammad Ardabili, who wrote Hadiqat al Shi'a. Abbas was not spared by the Shi'ia scholars, who argued that he should abdicate to make room for a more devoted king on account of Abbas's unholy lifestyle. Abbas drank heavily in his drinking parties with his courtiers, yet would dismiss his staff for their drunkenness. In 1653, the shah was persuaded to give up drinking by a Shi'ia scholar, possibly Sabzevari, who argued that abstemious monarchs were stronger, happier, and more likely to live longer, an example being Tahmasp I. Thereafter, for a short time between 1653 and 1654, the sale of alcohol was forbidden.

Regardless of his personal beliefs, Abbas still continued religious conversions even more fiercely than his predecessors. At various times between 1645 and 1654, the Safavid authorities forced the Iranian Jews to convert and the Armenian Christians to decamp to New Julfa. According to Abbas-nama by Mohammad Taher Vahid Qazvini, 20,000 Jewish families converted to Islam. However, the Armenian historian, Arakel of Tabriz, suggests the number was only 350. During Mohammad Beg's tenure, some of the Christian churches were closed and the Christians were forbidden to construct new churches. Abbas himself was tolerant towards Christians. He frequently attended Armenian church services and ceremonies, and gave permission for the Jesuits to establish a mission in Isfahan in 1653. He dismissed both the senior Shi'ia cleric, the Sheikh al-Islam of Isfahan, and the royal prayer-leader for preaching against Christians, and is even said to have threatened the former with impalement. Three years after Mohammad Beg's dismissal in 1664, the construction of the Vank Cathedral and five other churches were completed.

=== Military ===
Under Abbas II, the Safavid army military started to decline, either due to the peace with the Ottoman Empire or due to the concurrent economical crisis. This was first evident among the provincial contingents and not as yet among the main body of the royal army, which in 1654 was increased by a small corps of qurchi infantry consisting of 600 men, and later increasing to 2,000 men. However, the state could no longer pay the army while also supporting the court's extravagant and luxurious living. Therefore, serving soldiers became impoverished. The strength of units fell, and it was said that the Safavid army was useful for military parades but of no use for war.

=== Diplomacy ===
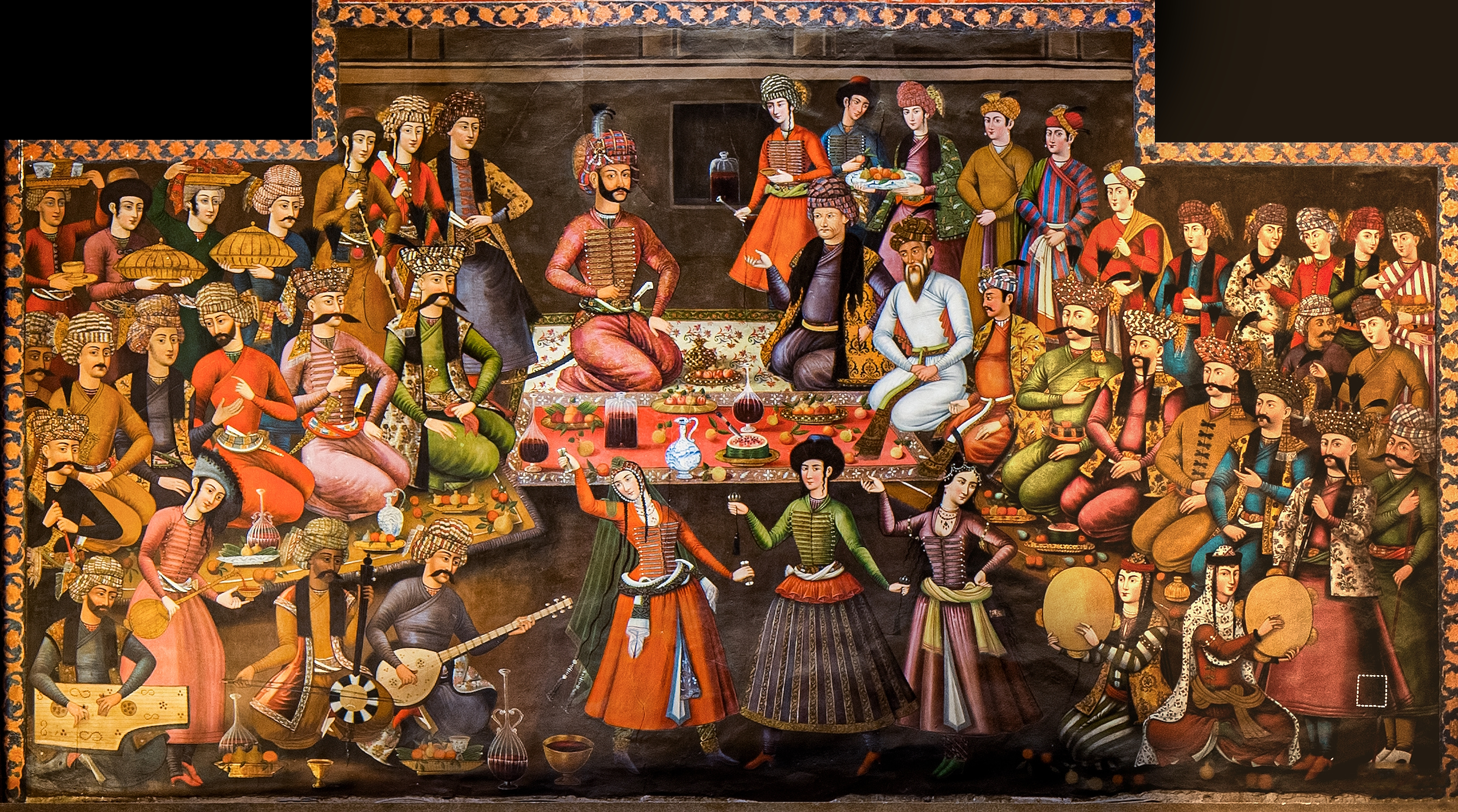
Contemporary depiction of the meeting of Abbas II with the deposed Khanate of Bukhara ruler Nader Mohammad Khan in 1646. Chehel Sotoun frescoe, Isfahan, painted circa 1647, soon after the events

Abbas II's foreign policy was cautious and calculating. During his reign, European maritime companies such as the VOC and the East India Company who had previously established their bases in Shiraz and Isfahan, were supported by Abbas through the privileges given to them. The Dutch and the English bought different types of silk such as brocade, taffeta, velvet and satin and in return, imported spices, sugar and textiles to Iran through the Persian Gulf. The companies' presence sometimes proved troublesome, its peak being in 1645, when the VOC was prompted to lay a naval blockade around Bandar Abbas because of what they saw as unfavourable terms for the purchase of silk. The blockade was short-lived, for the Dutch, wary of their own commercial losses and the expense involved, gave in to Iranian demands, after which they ended up concluding a new silk treaty in 1652. The French East India Company also attempted to establish trade relations with Iran. Abbas sanctioned against these trade relations in a firman issued shortly before his death, but for the time being nothing came of them.

The peaceful relations with the Ottoman Empire continued during Abbas' reign. He was not tempted to expand his territory, for instance in Transcaucasia, where the risk of war was so acute that the governor of the Turkish border provinces had even evacuated the civilian population in expectation of an Iranian attack, or in Basra, where the shah's aid had been sought to settle a struggle for the succession. No dangers arose from the Ottomans, whether because the Ottoman Sultan, Mehmed IV, was already occupied with the Cretan War, or because of the internal crises that occurred during his reign such as the 1660 fire of Constantinople , which destroyed two-thirds of the city. As a sign of lasting peace, in 1657, a new trade agreement was signed between the two empires which further assured the importance of the Anatolian trade routes and the Armenians’ role in the overland silk trade.

Relations with the Uzbeks were also peaceful. The new Khan of Khiva, Abu al-Ghazi Bahadur, who had spent many years in Safi's court in exile, was enthroned in the same year as Abbas. He did not threaten the Iranian borders in the Greater Khorasan. However, relations with the Khanate of Bukhara were hostile, although this hostility was not based on Uzebks raids, but rather, on the conflicts within the ruling dynasty of Bukhara, and the fugitive khans taking shelter in Iran. In 1646, Nader Mohammad Khan, the then Khan of Bukhara, took refuge in the young Abbas's court after being dethroned by his son, Abd al-Aziz Khan and losing Balkh to the Mughals. Abbas treated him with the utmost consideration and honour, sending his own physician to treat him when he fell ill, and in return, Mohammad Khan showed great delight and courtesy when the Shah came to visit him. Initially, the shah wanted to give Mohammad Khan military assistance to reclaim his throne, but Saru Taqi prevented him. In the end, with the Iranian cooperation, Mohammad Khan and Abd al-Aziz settled for a truce. The truce, however, only led to further strife in early 1650s, and Mohammad Khan again fled to Isfahan. He died en route in 1653. Later, Abbas arranged agreements with the Uzbeks of Bukhara and kept them from raiding the Iranian territory until his death.

=== Arts ===
Abbas's reign saw further construction in Isfahan, including the building of the Khaju Bridge, the completion of the Chehel Sotoun, and the expansion of the Ali Qapu. His construction in Isfahan led to the expansion of the city's public sphere, generating a lively coffeehouse culture combining royal patronage and popular entertainment in the form of Naqali (storytelling of Shahnameh). The sponsorship of the arts continued during his reign, causing a blossoming of the arts in the mid-to-late 17th century. The Persian miniature reached new heights of diversity with its leading figure Mo'en Mosavver, a student of Reza Abbasi, who contributed to at least five manuscripts of Shahnameh and was known for his single-page illustrations.

The popular demand for traditional miniatures were also strong in this era; painters such as Afzal al-Husayni and Malik Husayn Isfahani produced works for Shahnameh and also pictures of young men seated with bottles of wine and fruit. Abbas hired Dutch painters and studied drawing under them, but he also supported Iranian painters who painted in the Farangi-sazi or the Europeanising painting style. Two of Abbas' court artists, Mohammad Zaman and Aliquli Jabbadar, were influenced by the European painting style and made efforts to either copy it or to demonstrate traditional Iranian themes in the Western style. Abbas himself was fascinated by European paintings. He sent a group of Iranian painters to Europe for further training. Among them was Mohammad Zaman who spent two or three years in Rome. The masterpiece of Abbas II's reign is the Chehel Sotoun wall paintings. A palace intended for the Nowruz festivals, the Chehel Sotoun's wall paintings constitute the most important part of the palace's decorative program. They often depict historical scenes: the Battle of Marv between Ismail I and Muhammad Shaybani; Tahmasp I meeting Humayun, the Mughal emperor; Abbas I and Vali Muhammad Khan, the Khan of Bukhara; and a painting of Abbas II along with Nader Mohammad Khan.

Chehel Sotoun's wall paintings of Safavid historical scenes (painted circa 1650)

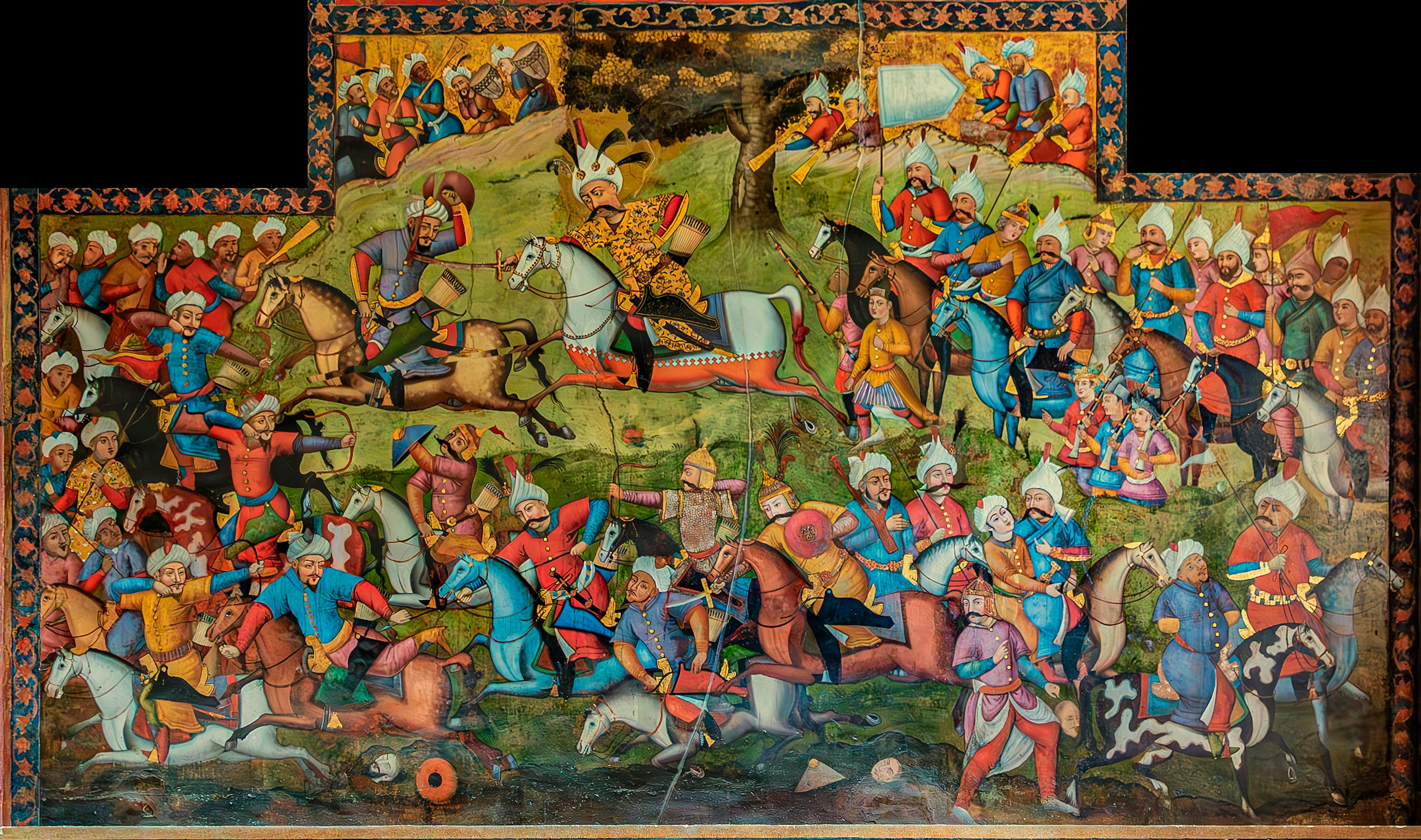
Battle of Merv (1510)

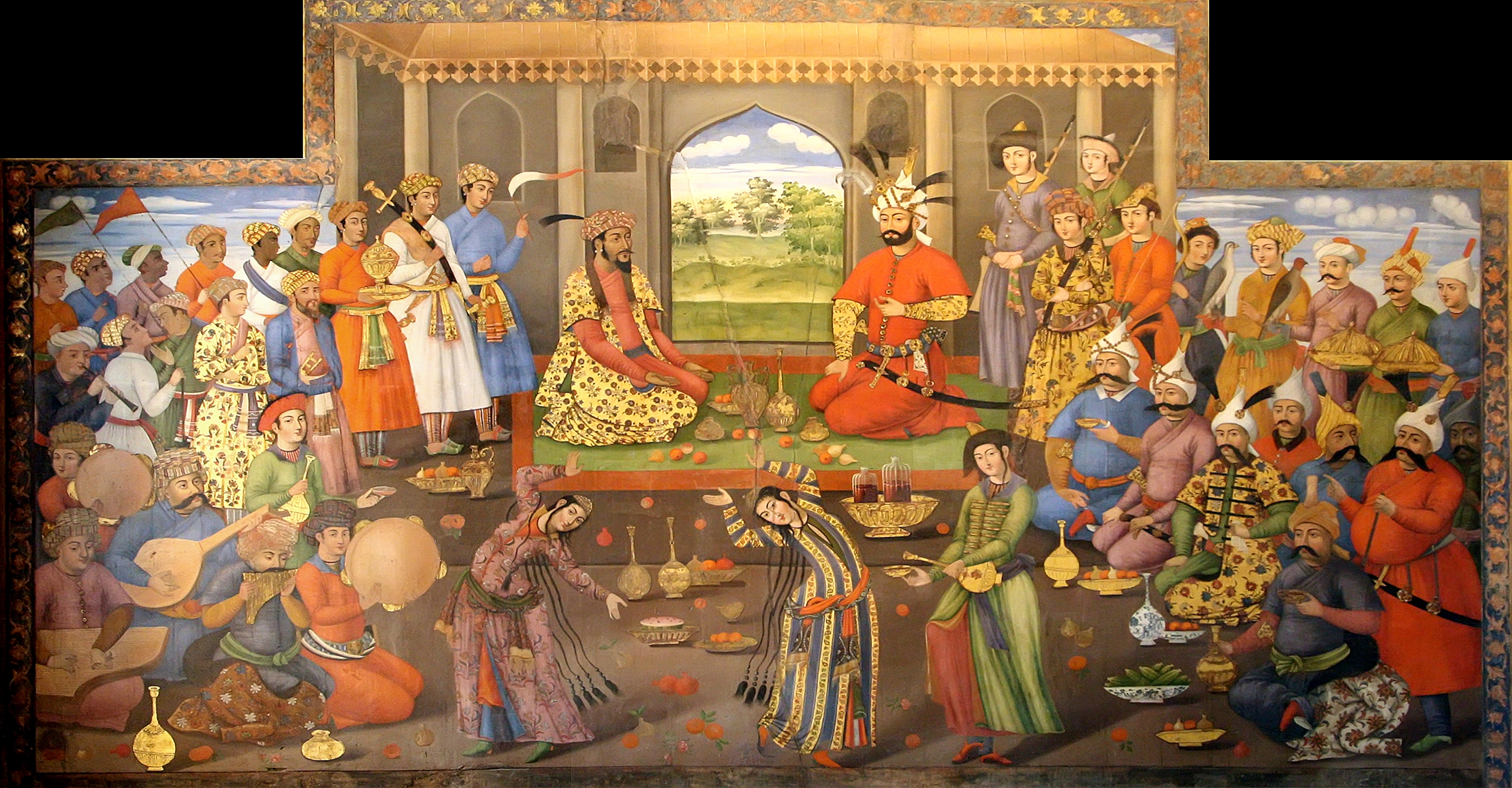
Meeting of Tahmasp I and Humayun

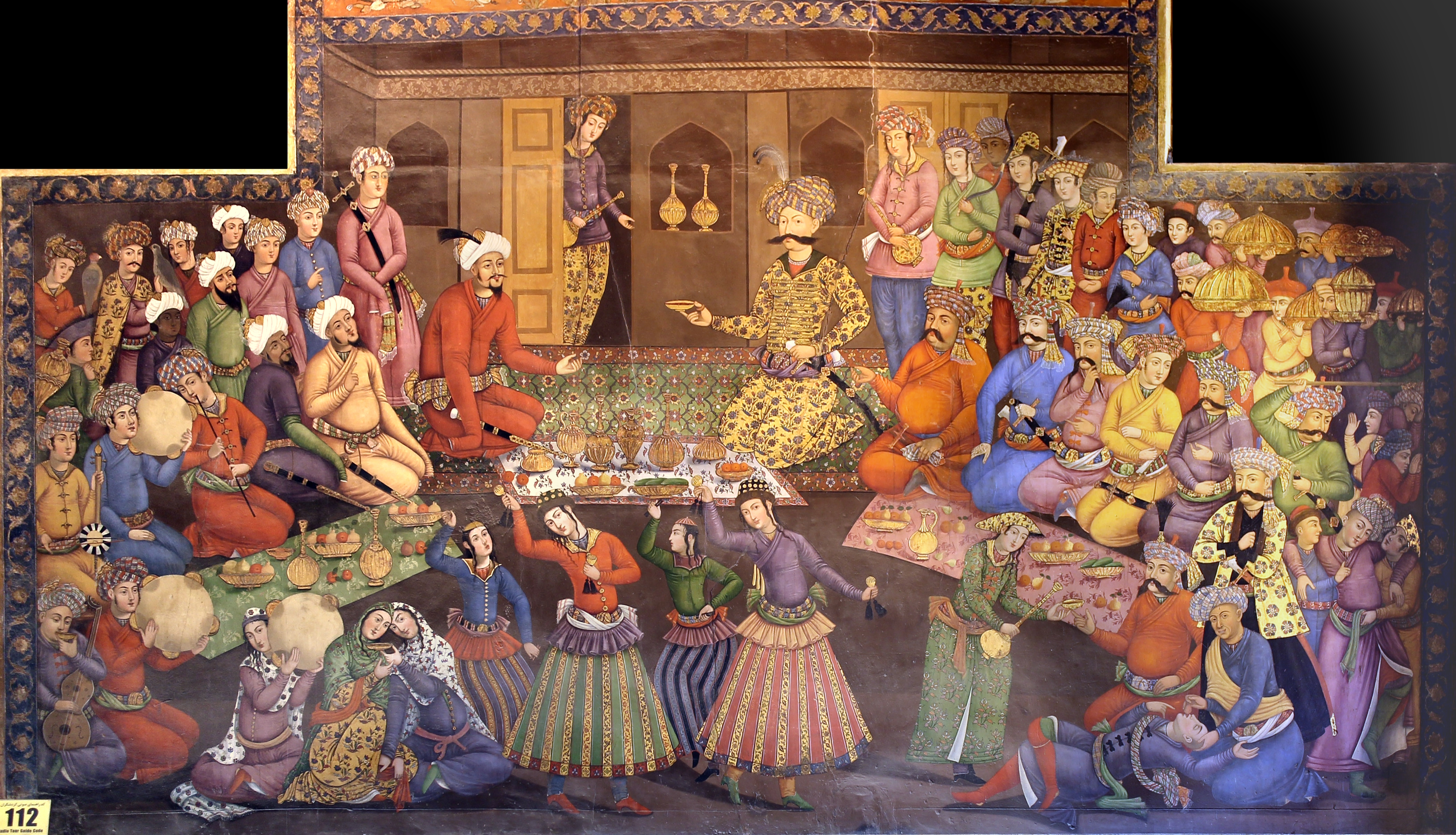
Meeting of Abbas the Great and Vali Muhammad Khan

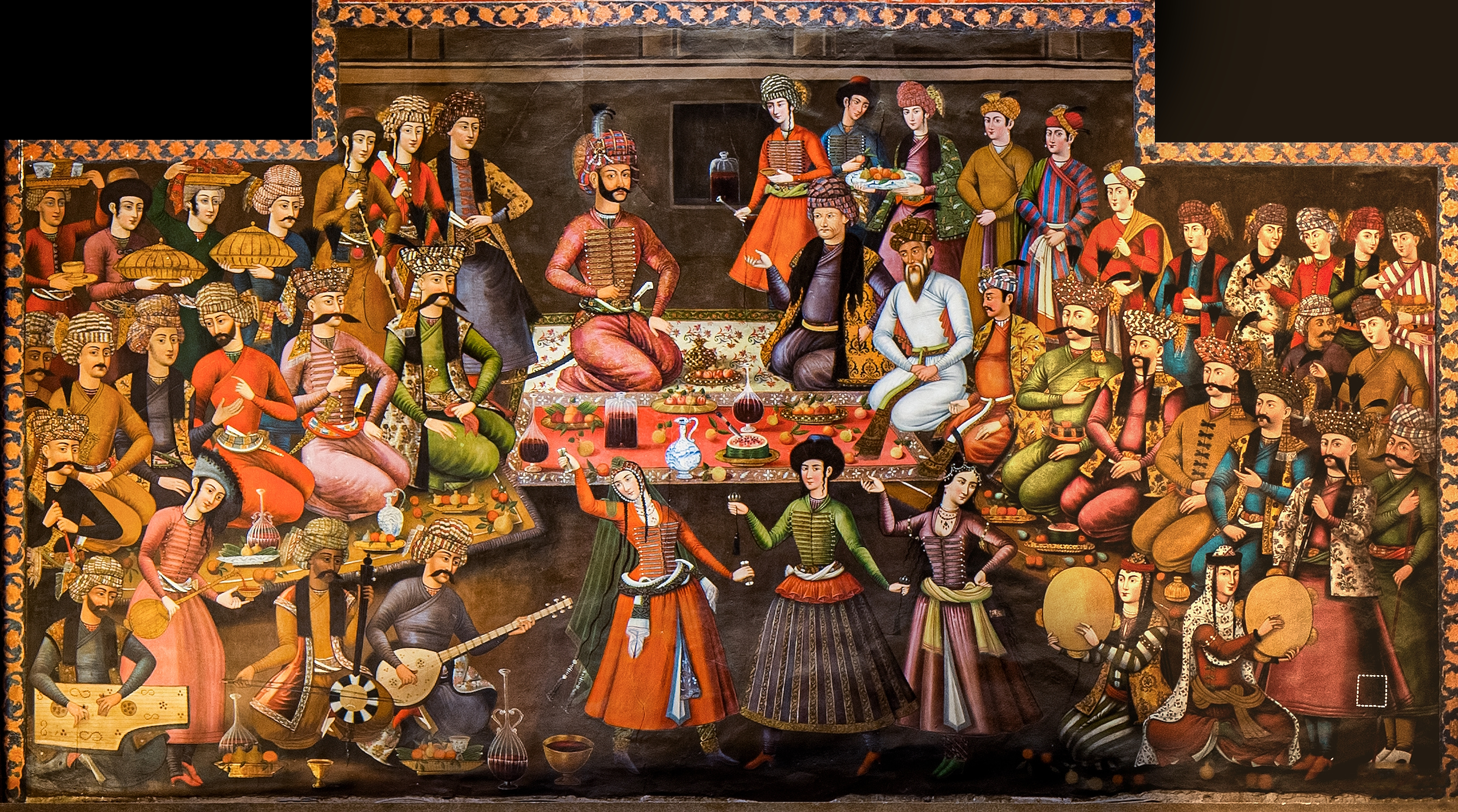
Meeting of Abbas II and Nader Mohammad Khan

Iranian ceramics production also continued apace during Abbas' reign despite the economic decline. As a result of Chinese influence, the ceramics between 1640s and 1650s became blue-and-white themed in accordance with the porcelain then coming from China.

These ceramics, made mainly in the Kerman workshops, were of sufficient quality to attract the attention of Dutch and English traders in Bandar Abbas who sought alternatives to Chinese porcelain that, following the Ming dynasty’s collapse in 1643–1645, stopped being exported until 1683. In addition to ceramics, Kerman, alongside Isfahan and Kashan, continued to be centres of the Persian carpet industry; producing carpets in silk with gold and silver brocade for both the Iranian court and non-court markets.

== Personality and appearance ==
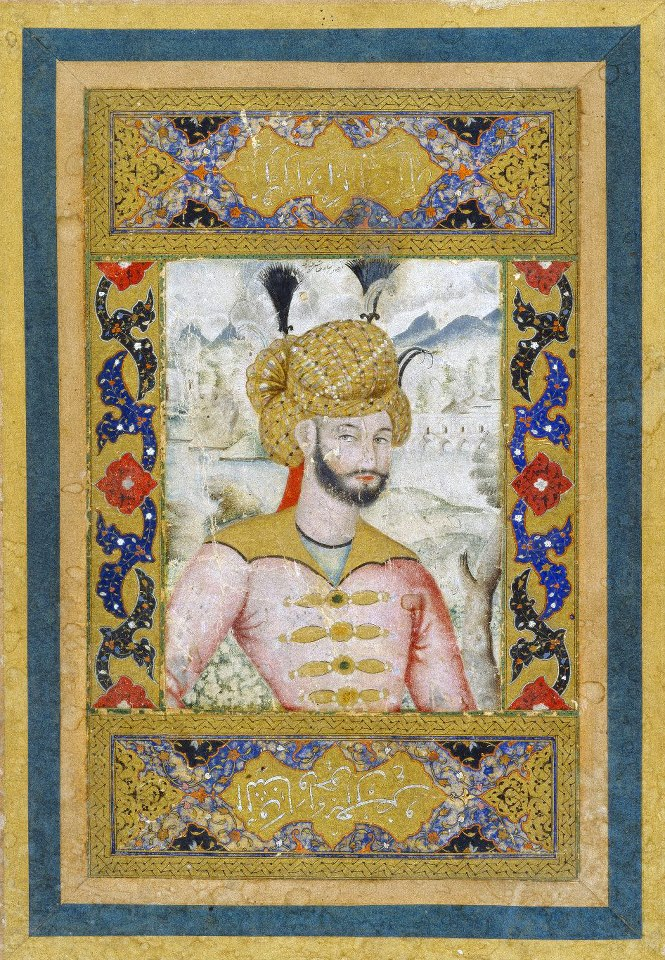
A painting of Abbas II, currently kept in the Brooklyn Museum. (Note the depiction of a full beard.)

Western observers have often portrayed Abbas II's personality in favourable terms. He was generous towards friends and strangers alike, especially in his carousing parties. Abbas started drinking in 1649, when he was only seventeen. His carousing parties are the most well-documented part of his life, being described in detail in the Abbas-nama. The shah would usually invite a small number of his favourite courtiers and drink with them. Throughout the Nowruz festivals and royal hunting parties, (Note: From a young age, Abbas enjoyed hunting leopards and falconry.) he allowed the wine to flow freely, and often requested the Western residents in Isfahan to join him. He allowed Western men to drink from his golden cup, a gift to him from Russia, which was "fully inlaid with precious stones, mostly uncut rubies".

Abbas has been praised for his sense of justice. In the words of Chardin, he considered himself put on the throne by God to rule as a king responsible for the welfare of all his subjects, not as a tyrant bent on the curtailment of freedom, including the freedom of conscience. In Western eyes, this sense of justice makes his brutality (which sometimes is seen as a fault) akin to the harsh punishments of Abbas the Great rather than the cruelty of Safi. According to Chardin, the Iranians appreciated Abbas's justice, stating that he treated his people favourably, while making himself feared abroad, and that he loved justice and did not abuse his power by oppressing his people.

The VOC envoy Joan Cuneaus, who met Abbas in 1652, described him as "being of medium height, rather skinny, loose-limbed, and beardless". However, surviving portraits show him with a longish face, sharply defined features and a wide, sweeping moustache. In some paintings, like that of Chehel Sotoun, Abbas was depicted with a very dark beard and moustache whereas in others, his facial hair is light, almost blond.

== Coinage ==
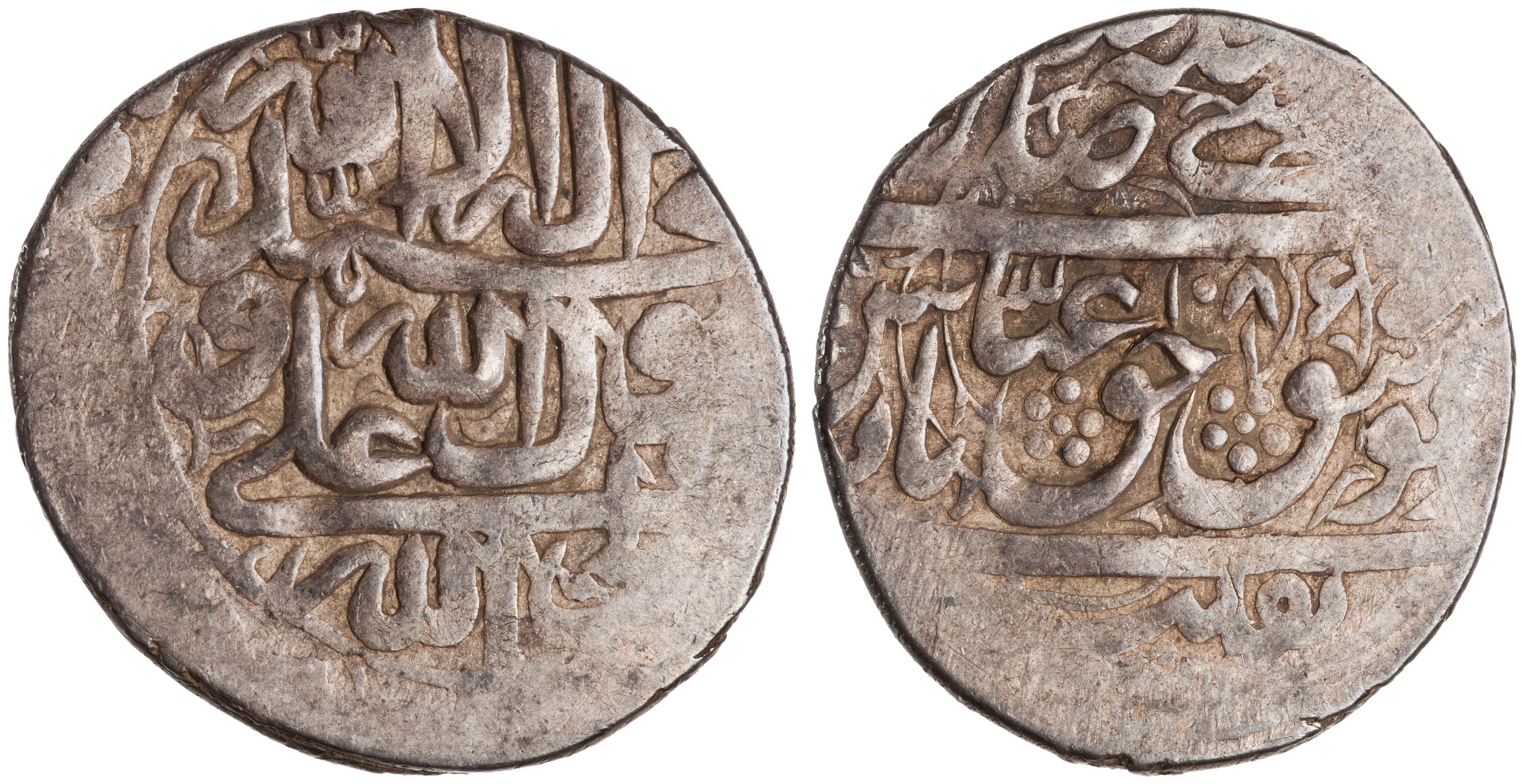
Coin of Abbas II, Tiflis mint, dated 1665

In his early years, Abbas II used the same distichs initiated by his great-grandfather, "Abbas banda-ye shāh-e velāyat" (Abbas, the servant of the realm's majesty), but in 1644, he replaced it for another distich "beh-giti sekka-ye sāhebqerāni / zad az towfiq-e haqq ‘Abbās-e Sāni" (In the universe a die of sahebqerani made / Assist by truth, ‘Abbās the second). In this panegyric distich, Abbas called himself Saheb Qeran, 'Lord of the Auspicious Conjunction', and accordingly, named his coins sahebqerani. This name gradually became widely used to refer to any state coin.

The financial crisis during his reign prompted Abbas to reduce the weight of his coins and decrease the number of Safavid mints that once numbered between 16 and 19. During the last decade of his reign, only ten of these mints were still operational. New mechanical European minting technology was introduced to Iran during Abbas's reign. He is said to have admired it and showed a desire to acquire this new technology.

== Legacy ==
A dominant feature attributed to Abbas II that distinguished him from his father and his successors was his persistent concern for state affairs. This feature did not wane even at the peak of his drinking and at the times of his illness. Described by historians such as Rudi Matthee as the last strong king of the Safavid dynasty, Abbas II is often mentioned alongside Ismail I and Abbas I as one of the three outstanding ruling figures of the Safavids. He could have been the king who prevented the downfall of the Safavid kingdom, if it were not for the numerous challenges that hampered his efforts. Abbas II is praised by European observers for ruling a prosperous realm, and one that had roads that were much safer than those of Europe. However, they failed to notice the corruption of Abbas’ internal Safavid bureaucracy, or that his campaign to Kandahar began an economic decline that would plague Iran until the end of Safavid dynasty.

Abbas made an effort to overcome the corruption within his bureaucracy. He was quick to intervene in cases of despotism, irregularities or malpractices, irrespective of whether it was a question of the normal administration of justice or the surveillance of political and administrative bodies, both civil and military. To ensure justice, he devoted several days a week for the purpose of rendering public justice; and during his reign it was still possible for commoners to hand him petitions in his palace. Abbas II chose his grand viziers wisely. He recruited them from diverse backgrounds that represented tribal, clerical, or gholam interests, but primarily on the basis of their fiscal and administrative competence, and gave them enough influence to ensure their own policies could be implemented. His endeavours meant that his 24-year-long reign was relatively peaceful and free of rebellions. The Iranian chronicles describe a number of years of his reign, such as 1660 and 1669, as “uneventful” and Western observers were often astonished by the well-being of the rural population in Iran in contrast to the worse plight of the peasants in the West. The same Western travellers speak of Abbas' reign with nostalgia when they visited Iran a generation later during the reign of his successor, Suleiman I. After the fall of the Safavid dynasty in 1722, commentators spoke of him as a forceful ruler who temporarily reversed the decline of the Safavid state. Modern historians, such as Hans Robert Roemer, call him a just, magnanimous and even liberal king, whose death marked the end of Safavid's long period of prosperity and peace.

== Ancestry ==
Ancestors of Abbas II of Persia

8. Mohammad Khodabanda
6. Abbas I
9. Khayr al-Nisa Begum
4. Mohammad Baqer Mirza
7. Fakhr-i Jahan Begam
2. Safi of Persia
5. Dilaram Khanum
1. Abbas II
3. Anna Khanum

Abbas II of Persia Safavid dynasty Born: 30 August 1632 Died: 26 October 1666
Iranian royalty
Preceded by Safi	Shah of Iran; 1642–1666	Succeeded by Suleiman I
