= Khalifeh Soltan =

Iranian statesman, cleric and grand vizier (c.1592–1654)

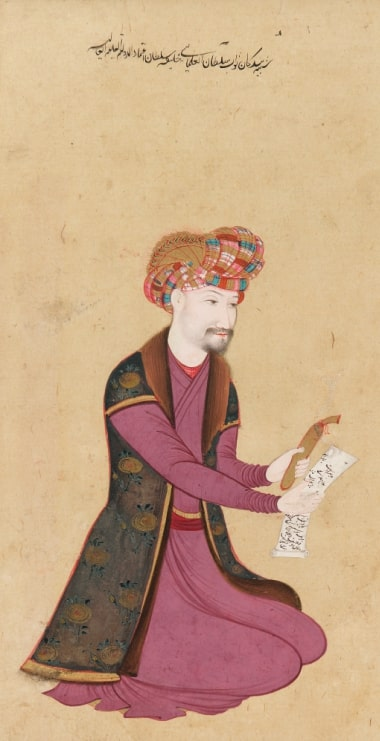
- Portrait of Khalifeh Soltan, by Mo'en Mosavver, c. 1650, opaque watercolor, ink and gold on paper

Grand Vizier of the Safavid Empire
- In office 1623/24–1632
- Monarchs: Abbas I Safi
- Preceded by: Salman Khan Ustajlu
- Succeeded by: Mirza Taleb Khan
- In office 14 October 1645 – 5 March 1654
- Monarch: Abbas II
- Preceded by: Saru Taqi
- Succeeded by: Mohammad Beg

Personal details
- Born: 1592/93 Isfahan, Safavid Iran
- Died: 5 March 1654 Ashraf, Mazandaran, Safavid Iran
- Spouse: Khan-Agha Begum
- Parents: Mirza Rafi al-Din Muhammad (father); Unnamed Marashi noblewoman (mother)

Seyyed Alauddin Hossein (Persian: سید علاء الدین حسین; c.1592 – 5 March 1654), better known as Khalifeh Soltan (خلیفه سلطان), and also known as Soltan al-Ulama (سلطان‌العلماء آملی), was an Iranian statesman and cleric, who served as the grand vizier of the Safavid king (shah) Abbas I (r. 1588–1629), the latter's grandson Safi (r. 1629–1642), and Abbas II (r. 1642–1666).

A member of a prominent Seyyed family with origins in the royal Marashi family of Mazandaran, Khalifeh Soltan was a well-educated man of letters, who played an important role in the Iranian clergy affairs, and also later in the Safavid administration, when he was appointed as grand vizier in 1623/4.

He was, however, in 1632, disgraced and exiled by the ruthless newly crowned shah Safi. Later, in 1645, Khalifeh Soltan was re-appointed as grand vizier by the latter's son and successor, Abbas II, whom he became a close companion of, and gained considerable influence. Khalifeh Soltan later died on 5 March 1654 in his ancestral homeland of Mazandaran due to illness, and was succeeded by Mohammad Beg.

== Origins ==
Khalifeh Soltan's full name was Seyyed Alauddin Hossein Hosseini Marashi Amoli Isfahani; he was born in ca. 1592/93 in Isfahan, where he grew up; his father Mirza Rafi al-Din Muhammad was a prominent aristocrat who occupied high offices in the Safavid Empire, and belonged to a family known as the "Shahristani sayyids", which was descended from Shah Nimatullah, the founder of the Nimatullahi order. Khalifeh Soltan's mother belonged to a family known as the "Khalifeh sayyids", a family of Marashi descent, whose ancestor, Amir Nezam al-Din, was forced to settle in the Golbar quarter of Isfahan in the 15th century. Khalifeh Soltan was thus related to Shah Abbas I, whose mother was Khayr al-Nisa Begum, a Marashi princess who had fled to the Safavid court and married the previous Safavid shah Mohammad Khodabanda (r. 1578–1587).

Even though the Khalifeh seyyed family was renowned of being descendants of the celebrated Marashi ruler Mir-i Buzurg (r. 1359–1362), they still weren't one of the leading families of Isfahan yet. But they were still affluent and distinguished enough to intermarry with local well-known families. According to the Safavid court historian Iskandar Munshi, "The Khalifeh family had held estates in the Isfahan area for generations."

Khalifeh Soltan had a brother named Mirza Qavam al-Din Mohammad, who later, like himself and their father, would occupy high offices.

== Biography ==
=== First term as grand vizier (1623/4–1632) ===
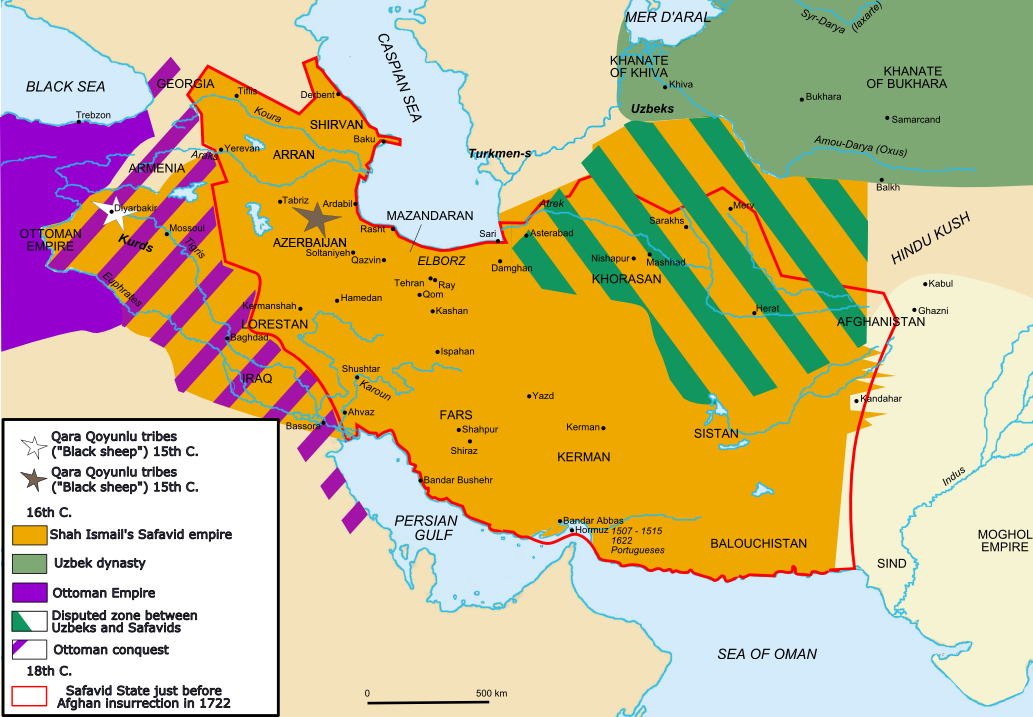
Map of the Safavid Empire at the appointment of Khalifeh Soltan.

On 28 November 1607, Khalifeh Soltan married shah Abbas I's third daughter, Khan-Agha Begum. After the marriage, Khalifeh Soltan asked for the governorship of Tabriz as an outcome of the cheerful circumstance, which was, however, declined. This demonstrates Khalifeh Soltan's early passion in getting a role in the state bureaucracy.

Khalifeh Soltan was later in 1623/4 appointed by the shah as his grand vizier. When Khalifeh Soltan became grand vizier, Baghdad had recently been captured, while a Safavid army was marching towards Basra to capture it. Furthermore, during this period, the Armenians suffered from persecutions by Abbas I. In late 1624, after celebrating Nowruz, Abbas I left for Georgia to suppress a rebellion, thus leaving the young Khalifeh Soltan in Isfahan, to take care of the Safavid affairs.

On 24 March 1626, an event occurred that "portended tragedy and turned to comedy". On that day, Khalifeh Soltan, who was still new to the grand vizier post, sent 200 soldiers to the convent of the Carmelites, a Catholic religious order. The soldiers inspected the convent, and then beat the monks and took them to Khalifeh Soltan. The monks thought they were going to be killed, and supposedly were excited that they were going to be martyred.

However, this was not the case; Khalifeh Soltan, enraged by his soldiers treatment of the monks, threatened to kill the officer who led the soldiers. The monks, however, urged Khalifeh Soltan to spare him, which he did. Khalifeh Soltan and his officials then began asking the monks several questions about Christianity. He then discovered that the monks were not Augustinian monks, whom he had been advised to move to Shiraz, "because of Portuguese at Basra, which were considered contrary to Persian interests". He then let the Carmelites go.

=== Dismissal and exile ===
Abbas I died in 1629 and was succeeded by his grandson Safi, who in 1632 executed and exiled most of the officers who had served his grandfather, which included Khalifeh Soltan, who was dismissed on February 14 and thereafter exiled to Qom, while his four sons, who belonged to the Safavid royal house through their mother, were blinded. During his exile in Qom, he focused in expertise and making observations on several valuable texts. According to the person who edited the Dastur al-wuzarā, Khalifeh Soltan was the composer of that work, which was written between 1645 and 1654. In 1638/9, Khalifeh Soltan may have returned to Isfahan. However, it is known that by 1645 he was living in the city, after having performed a pilgrimage to Mecca. During his pilgrimage, he had met Ottaqi Efendi, the shaykh of Mecca, who described him as a "man of great scholarship and perspicacity", and someone with whom he had had "many enjoyable sessions of learned discussions".

=== Second term as grand vizier (1645–1654) ===
On 11 October 1645, the grand vizier Saru Taqi was murdered under the orders of Abbas II, who appointed Khalifeh Soltan as his grand vizier on 14 October. Khalifeh Soltan had at first declined the offer, but later quickly accepted. His established bureaucratic proficiency and past knowledge were definitely the deciding factors in this reappointment, albeit it may be possible that Abbas II recalled him into duty in part with the goal of compressing the discontent about the scarcity of the positions given to men of religion under his predecessor. The Dutch trader Winninx, who was in Isfahan for transactions with the royal court at that time, commented the following about the situation; "He first refused to accept the post claiming to be too old and not competent enough to carry out the task. However, everybody expected him to accept the function. Khalifeh Soltan was universally liked and considered to be an upright person".

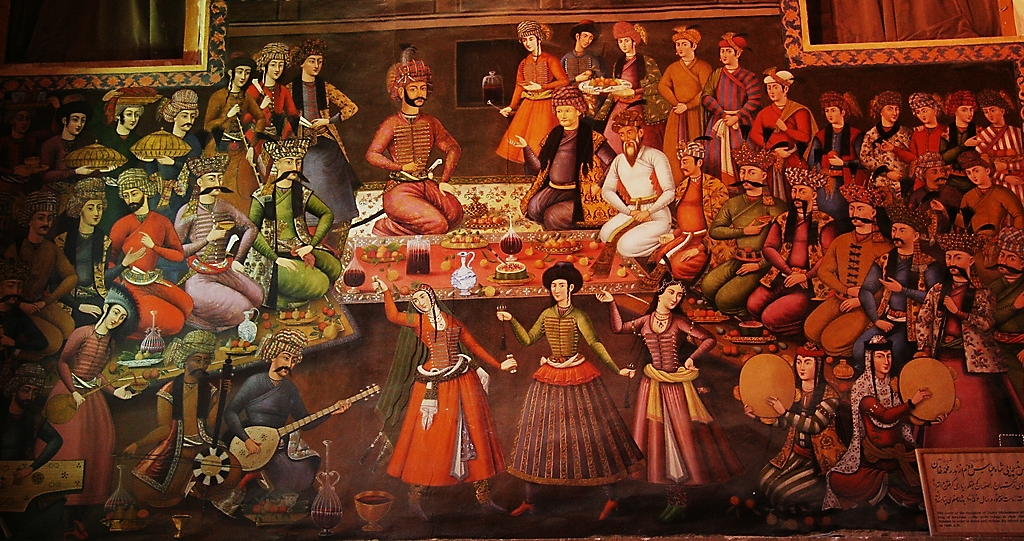
The court of Shah Abbas II (r. 1642–1666).

Khalifeh Soltan's actions during his second term as grand vizier are much better described and unveils a complex identity. Committing up to his notoriety as a dedicated man and a cleric, he started his second term with an operation countering "sinful behaviour", which targeted betting, prostitution, and wine drinking-activities that were normal in coffee houses and taverns. The operation was mainly aimed against well-known forms of Sufism, but did not stop Khalifeh Soltan from showing (more virtuous) mystical tendencies, or from becoming one of Abbas II's close companions after the shah started drinking in 1649/50. The contemporary Persian historian Nasrabadi implies that Khalifeh Soltan was forced to drink against his will by the shah, which is probable. A year earlier (1648), Khalifeh Soltan had accompanied Abbas II during his expedition against the Mughals, which ended in a victory for the Safavids, who managed to capture Bost and Kandahar.

Khalifeh Soltan is also said to have assembled constant public gatherings for people with appeals and gripes, a routine that was cancelled under his successors. He additionally demonstrated to be an insightful diplomat with the deputies of the foreign naval companies. Khalifeh Soltan was chosen as a representative for the wealthy and pure-blooded Iranian clerical elite. He possessed the village of Golnabad on the road linking Isfahan and Yazd, and he had an important madrasa constructed in Qazvin.

After having been ill for 40 days, Khalifeh Soltan died on 5 March 1654 in Mazandaran, the homeland of his ancestors. His body was then taken to Najaf in Iraq, where he was buried. He was succeeded by Mohammad Beg, a Muslim of Armenian origin.

== Offspring ==
Khalifeh Soltan's four sons, whom were all blinded in 1632 by Safi, were due to this not able to hold any post. They did, however, become renowned ulama. One of these sons, Mirza Sayyed Hasan, was one of the most dominant ulama of his time. He had married the Safavid princess Zobeydeh Khanum, who was the daughter of the later Shah Suleiman I (r. 1666–1694), and the sister of Shah Soltan Hoseyn (r. 1694–1722). She bore him Mirza Mohammad Baqer and Mir Seyyed Morteza, who both served as the sadr-i khasseh and sadr-i mamalik under their cousin Soltan Hossein.

Khalifeh Soltan also had several daughters—in 1651/52, one of his daughters married the son of the minister of religion (sadr-e mamalik) Mirza Mohammad Karaki. Another daughter was married to Mirza Mohsen Razavi, whilst a third one was married to the qurchi-bashi Morteza Qoli Khan Shamlu.

== Notes ==
a: Also spelled Khalifa Sultan and Khalifeh Sultan.

== Sources ==
- Blow, David (2009). Shah Abbas: The Ruthless King Who became an Iranian Legend. London, UK: I. B. Tauris & Co. Ltd. ISBN 978-1-84511-989-8. LCCN 2009464064.
- Matthee, Rudi (2011). Persia in Crisis: Safavid Decline and the Fall of Isfahan. I.B.Tauris. pp. 1–371. ISBN 978-0857731814.
- Babaie, Sussan (2004). Slaves of the Shah: New Elites of Safavid Iran. I.B.Tauris. pp. 1–218. ISBN 9781860647215.
- Matthee, Rudi (2010). "ḴALIFA SOLṬĀN". Encyclopædia Iranica. Vol. XV, Fasc. 4. pp. 382–384.
- Newman, Andrew J. (2008). Safavid Iran: Rebirth of a Persian Empire. I.B.Tauris. pp. 1–281. ISBN 9780857716613.
- Savory, Roger (2007). Iran under the Safavids. Cambridge University Press. pp. 1–288. ISBN 978-0521042512.
- Roemer, H.R. (1986). "The Safavid period". The Cambridge History of Iran, Volume 5: The Timurid and Safavid periods. Cambridge: Cambridge University Press. pp. 189–351. ISBN 9780521200943.
- Floor, Willem (2005), "A Note on The Grand Vizierate in Seventeenth Century Persia", Zeitschrift der Deutschen Morgenländischen Gesellschaft, 155 (2), Harrassowitz Verlag: 435–481, JSTOR 43382107
- Nashat, Guity; Beck, Lois (2003). Women in Iran from the Rise of Islam to 1800. University of Illinois Press. pp. 1–253. ISBN 978-0-252-07121-8.

Preceded by Salman Khan Ustajlu	Grand vizier of the Safavid Empire; 1623/4 – 1632	Succeeded by Mirza Talib Khan
Preceded by Saru Taqi	Grand vizier of the Safavid Empire; 1645 – 1654	Succeeded by Mohammad Beg
