= Khasseh =

Map of Safavid Iran and its divisions in 1660

Khasseh (crown domain) was a type of administrative division within Safavid Iran designed to centralize authority and maximize state revenue. It was introduced during the reign of Shah Tahmasp I (r. 1526–1576), and heavily expanded under Shah Abbas I (r. 1587–1629). It reached its zenith under Shah Abbas II (r. 1642–1666). Khasseh lands were governed by viziers.

The grand vizier Saru Taqi was the principal architect of this policy. He argued lands should be directly appropriated by the government now that semi-independent provincial governors were no longer needed, due to the decreased risk of military threats.

== Sources ==
- Floor, Willem (2021). "The Safavid court and government". In Matthee, Rudi (ed.). The Safavid World. Routledge. pp. 203–224. ISBN 978-1138944060.
- Matthee, Rudi (2021). "Safavid Iran from Shah Safi to Shah Soltan Hoseyn: stability and stasis". In Matthee, Rudi (ed.). The Safavid World. Routledge. pp. 144–163. ISBN 978-1138944060.
