= Mirza Qavam al-Din Mohammad =

Iranian cleric and statesman (1600s)

Mirza Qavam al-Din Mohammad (Persian: میرزا قوام الدین محمد) was an Iranian cleric and statesman, who served as the sadr-i mamalik (minister of religion) from 1661 to 1664. He was the son of Mirza Rafi al-Din Muhammad, and thus the brother of the high-ranking statesman Khalifeh Sultan.

== Sources ==
- Matthee, Rudi (2011). Persia in Crisis: Safavid Decline and the Fall of Isfahan. I.B.Tauris. pp. 1–371. ISBN 978-0857731814.
- Babaie, Sussan (2004). Slaves of the Shah: New Elites of Safavid Iran. I.B.Tauris. pp. 1–218. ISBN 9781860647215.

| Preceded by Mirza Mohammad Mahdi Karaki | Sadr-i mamalik 1661–1664 | Unknown |
