= Russo-Persian War (1651–1653) =

First conflict of the Russo-Persian Wars

Russo Persian War (1651–1653)
- Part of the Russo-Persian Wars
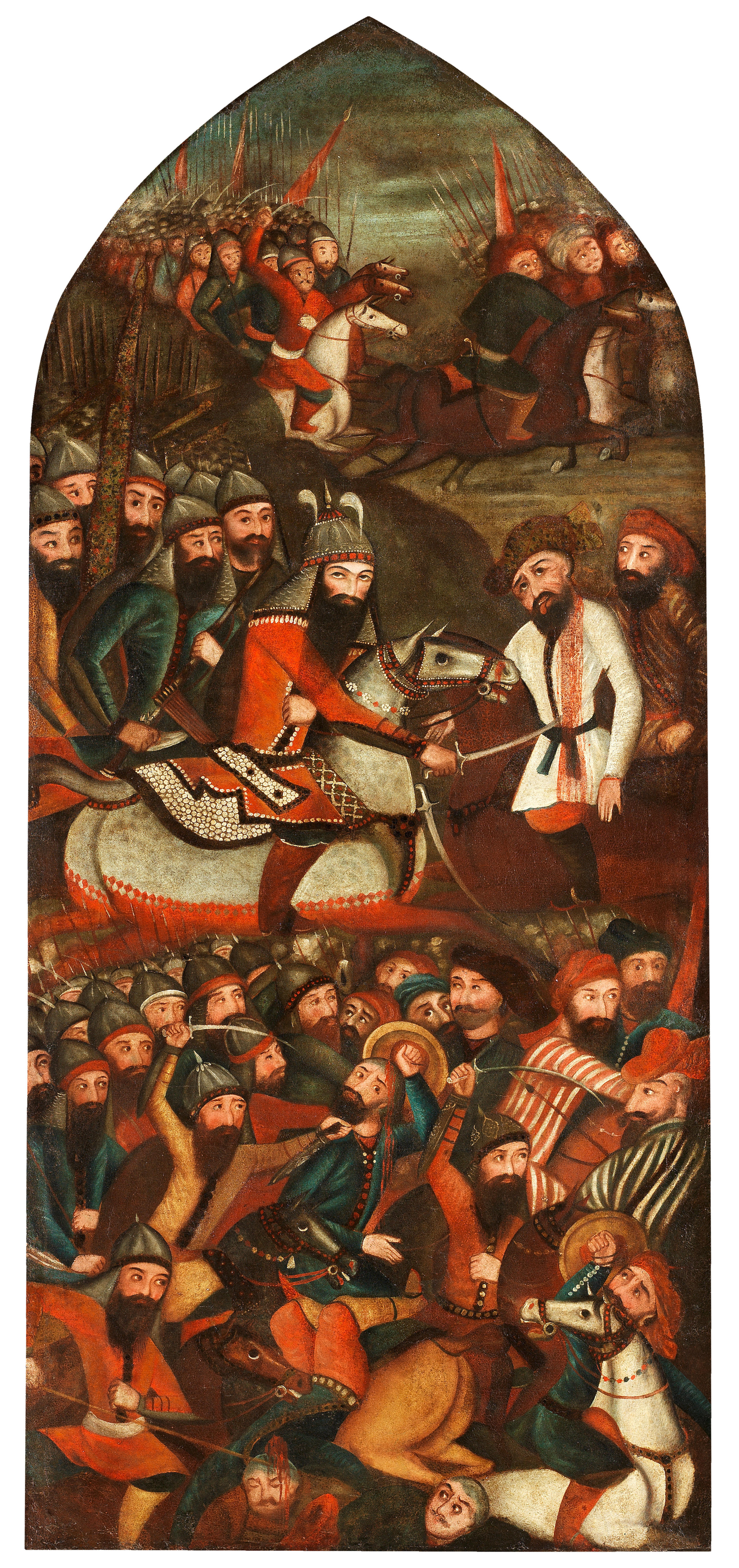
- Qajar-era painting, perhaps anachronistically depicting the Iranian victory over the Russians in the 1651–1653 war. The Iranian figure in the center likely represents the military official Khosrow Khan, depicted as both a Qajar prince and a mytho-historical hero of the Shahnameh. The opposing Russian forces, dressed in antiquated and provincial-style clothing, likely represent local troops from the North Caucasus
Date	1651–1653
Location	Dagestan, North Caucasus
Result	Persian victory: Safavids destroy the Russian fortress on the Iranian side of the Terek River, and expel its garrison

Belligerents
Tsardom of Russia	Safavid Iran

Commanders and leaders
Alexis of Russia	Abbas II; Khosrow Khan; Shamkhal of Kumukh; Ruler (Utsmi) of the Kara Qaytaq

Strength
Unknown	First Campaign: 12,800 men Second Campaign: 20,000 men

Casualties and losses
Unknown	Unknown

The Russo-Persian War of 1651–1653 was an armed conflict in the North Caucasus fought between the Safavid Empire and the Tsardom of Russia, associated with the Safavid plans to strengthen its position in the region and to exclude Russia. The main issue involved the expansion of a Russian garrison on the Koy Su River, as well as the construction of several new fortresses, in particular the one built on the Iranian side of the Terek River. The Safavid government then sent troops, and destroyed the fortress while expelling its Russian garrison. In 1653 Alexis of Russia and the Russian government, which thought about sending the Russian Zaporozhian Army, but did not want to disperse its forces, sent an embassy to Persia for a peaceful settlement of the conflict. Shah Abbas II agreed, stating that the conflict was initiated without his consent.

== Events ==
From the 1520s there had been Cossacks on the Terek River. They were more-or-less controlled by the Russian governor at Astrakhan, the intervening land being nomad country. South of the Terek in Dagestan were various khanates who recognized the supremacy of Persia. The main Cossack town was Terki on the lower Terek. The Cossack towns had local allies who were a major part of their military force. In 1634 they built a new fort on the lower Sunzha River near the modern city of Grozny, in support of the Georgian ruler Teimuraz I, who had been deposed by his Safavid suzerains and had turned to the Russians for aid. The immediate pretext was the plundering, by a group of Cossacks, of a caravan belonging to the Khan of Shamakhi. He demanded compensation from the Astrakhan governor and threatened to eliminate both the Cossacks and Astrakhan.

First campaign: In 1651 the Shamakhi Khan received a decree from the Shah telling him to destroy the Sunzha fort and march on Astrakhan. 12,000 men were gathered from all over Dagestan along with 800 Persian regulars. They marched to the Sunzha River. Between 25 October and 7 November, there were a number of battles which the Russians won. After looting the surrounding country the Dagestanis withdrew, taking with them thousands of horses, cattle, sheep, and camels as well as human captives.

Second campaign: When the then incumbent Safavid king (shah) Abbas II learned of the events, he ordered the governors of Ardabil, Chokhur-e Sa'd (Erivan), Qarabagh, Astara and parts of Azerbaijan to send forces in order to assist the Safavid governor of Shirvan, Khosrow Khan. Further reinforcements were sent by the governor of Derbent, the Shamkhal of Kumukh, as well as the ruler of Kara Qaytaq. On 7 March 1653 a 20,000 man Persian army, made up of Persians, Kumyks, Nogais, and Dagestani mountaineers began a siege of the Sunzha fort. On 25 March the remains of the garrison managed to slip out and make it to Terki. After devastating the surrounding area the army returned to Tarki in Dagestan (1 April). By the end of the campaign, the Russians (and the Nogais who assisted them) were driven out of the fort, and the fort was destroyed by the Safavid forces.

The Shah planned a third campaign but this was prevented by the Mughal siege of Kandahar. A Russian ambassador went to Persia and settled the matter (April–October 1654). In Moscow, the Persian ambassador said that the Shemakhi Khan had acted on his own authority but he could not be punished because he had suddenly died.

== Other wars ==
The situation was complicated for both states. Troops of the Mughal Empire attacked the far eastern borders of Persia, besieging Kandahar. Persia could not fight on two fronts. Peace was needed, both for Persia and Russia, which was preparing for war with Poland (the Russo-Polish War (1654-67)).

== Resolution ==
In August 1653 Prince Ivan Lobanov-Rostovsky and Ivan Komynin traveled from Astrakhan to Iran. In April 1654 the ambassadors met with the Shah in Iran. As a result of the Russian-Iranian negotiations and compromises, the conflict was extinguished. In October 1654 the "Great Embassy" moved back.

The fall of the Sunzha fort led to some strengthening of Persia's position. Shah increased the pressure on the Highlanders, and in 1658 announced the construction of two fortresses on lands of Kumyk. This provoked a sharp protest among mountaineers who rebelled against Persia.

== See also ==
- North Caucasus Line
- Russo-Persian Wars
- Russo-Turkish War

== Sources ==
- Matthee, Rudolph P. (1999). The Politics of Trade in Safavid Iran: Silk for Silver, 1600-1730. Cambridge: Cambridge University Press. ISBN 978-0521641319.
- Matthee, Rudi (2012). Persia in Crisis: Safavid Decline and the Fall of Isfahan. I.B.Tauris. ISBN 978-1845117450.
