= Khosrow Soltan Armani =

Safavid official and military commander (died 1653)

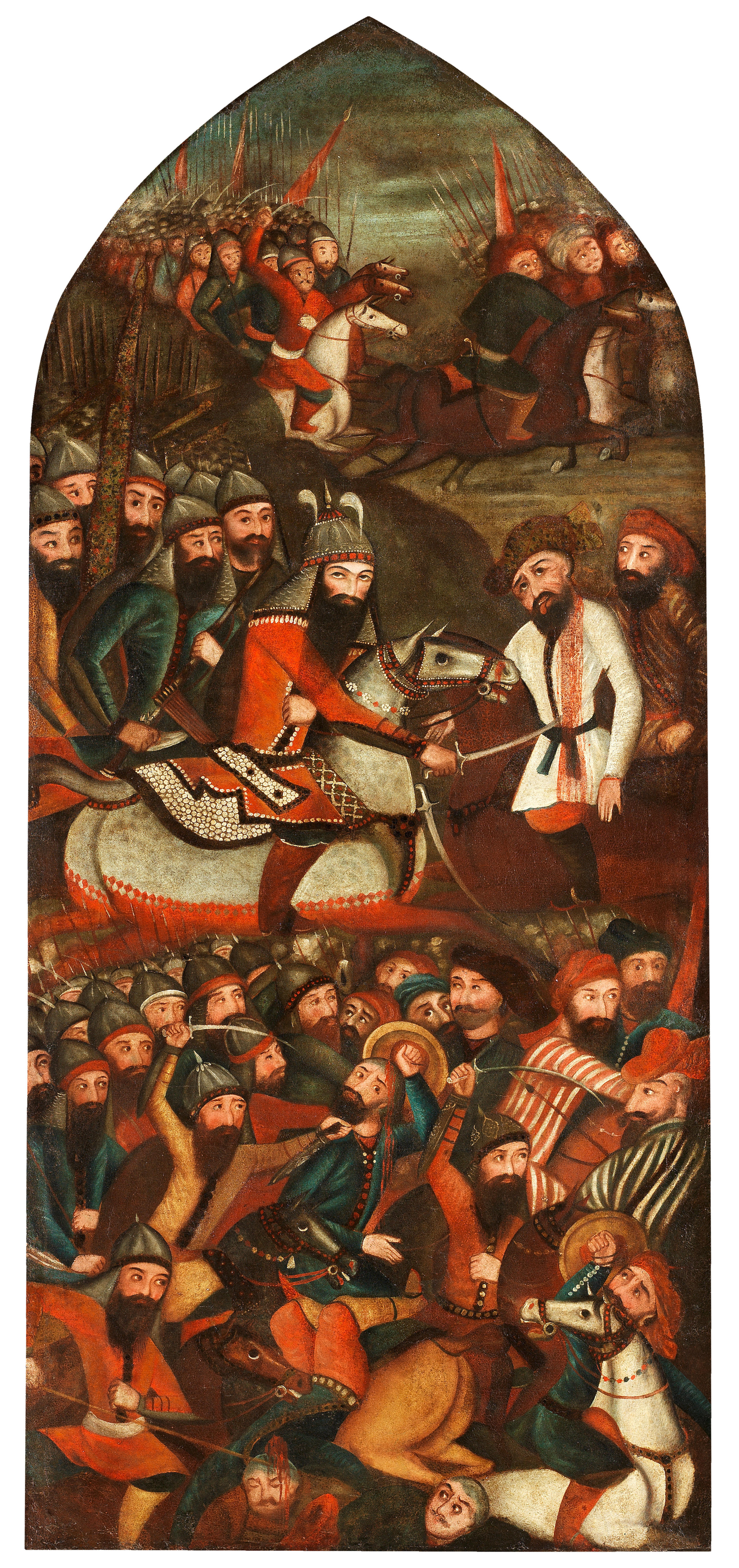
- Qajar-era painting, perhaps anachronistically depicting the Iranian victory over the Russians in the 1651–1653 war. The Iranian figure in the center likely represents Khosrow Khan, depicted as both a Qajar prince and a mytho-historical hero of the Shahnameh. The opposing Russian forces, dressed in antiquated and provincial-style clothing, likely represent local troops from the North Caucasus

Governor of Shirvan
- In office 1643–1653
- Preceded by: Arab Khan Shamlu
- Succeeded by: Najafqoli Khan Cherkes

Governor of Abhar (Soltaniyeh)
- In office before 1642 – Unknown
- Preceded by: Safiqoli Khan Begdeli
- Succeeded by: Safiqoli Beg

Master of the hunt (mīr shekār-bāshi)
- In office 1632–1645
- Preceded by: Qujeh Beg
- Succeeded by: Allahverdi Khan (Armenian)

Personal details
- Died: 1653
- Children: Allahverdi Khan (Armenian) and Emamverdi Beg
- Occupation: Military leader, official

Military service
- Allegiance: Safavid Iran
- Battles/wars: Russo-Persian War of 1651–1653

Khosrow Soltan Armani (Persian: خسرو سلطان ارمنی; died 1653), also known as Khosrow Khan, was a Safavid official, military commander, and gholam of Armenian origin. He held numerous posts at various times. First, he served as the prefect of the Bakhtiari tribe for a lengthy period (darughah-ye il-e Bakhtiyar). Then, he served as a steward of the Javanshir tribe in Karabagh (hakem-e il-e Javanshir). Later, he held the post of "master of the hunt" (mīr shekār-bāshi) and was given the governorship of Abhar (Soltaniyeh). Lastly, he also served as the governor (beglarbeg) of Shirvan from 1643 to 1653. During his governorship in Shirvan, Khosrow participated in the successful Safavid offensive during the Russo-Persian War of 1651–1653, which resulted in the Russian fortress on the Iranian side of the Terek River being destroyed and its garrison expelled.

To denote that he was a convert, in the then contemporary sources Khosrow was referred to as being "new to Islam" (jadid ol-eslam). His sons Allahverdi Khan (not to be mistaken with the Georgian Allahverdi Khan) and Emamverdi Beg would hold several influential positions as well.

== Sources ==
- Baghdiantz-McCabe, Ina (2008). "Caucasian Elites and Modern State-Building in Safavid Iran". In Chaudhury, Shushil; Kévonian, Kéram (eds.). Les Arméniens dans le commerce asiatique au début de l'ère moderne. Maison des Sciences de l'Homme. p. 99. ISBN 978-2735112043.
- Fleischer, C. (1985). "ALLĀHVERDĪ KHAN (2)". Encyclopaedia Iranica, Vol. I, Fasc. 8. p. 892.
- Floor, Willem (2001). Safavid Government Institutions. Costa Mesa, California: Mazda Publishers. p. 117. ISBN 978-1568591353.
- Floor, Willem M.; Faghfoory, Mohammad H. (2007). The Dastur Al-moluk: A Safavid State Manual, by Mohammad Rafi' al-Din Ansari. Mazda Publishers. pp. 187–188. ISBN 978-1568591957.
- Floor, Willem M. (2008). Titles and Emoluments in Safavid Iran: A Third Manual of Safavid Administration, by Mirza Naqi Nasiri. Washington, DC: Mage Publishers. pp. 209, 286–287, 292. ISBN 978-1933823232.
- Matthee, Rudolph P. (1999). The Politics of Trade in Safavid Iran: Silk for Silver, 1600-1730. Cambridge: Cambridge University Press. pp. 120, 169. ISBN 978-0521641319.
- Matthee, Rudi (2012). Persia in Crisis: Safavid Decline and the Fall of Isfahan. I.B.Tauris. p. 122. ISBN 978-1845117450.
- Matthee, Rudi (2012). "Facing a Rude and Barbarous Neighbor: Iranian Perceptions of Russia and the Russians from the Safavids to the Qajars". In Amanat, Abbas; Vejdani, Farzin (eds.). Iran Facing Others: Identity Boundaries in a Historical Perspective. Palgrave Macmillan. p. 104. ISBN 978-1137013408.

Preceded by Qujeh Beg	Master of the hunt (mīr shekār-bāshi); 1632–1645	Succeeded by Allahverdi Khan (Armenian)
Preceded by Safiqoli Khan Begdeli	Governor of Abhar (Soltaniyeh) before 1642	Succeeded by Safiqoli Beg, son of Saru Soltan
Preceded by `Arab Khan Shamlu	Governor of Shirvan; 1643–1653	Succeeded by Najafqoli Khan Cherkes
