= Mirza Mohammad Karaki =

Safavid Shia cleric and grand Vizier in 1661–1669

Grand Vizier of the Safavid Empire
- In office 11 March 1661 – 1669
- Monarchs: Shah Abbas II (r. 1642–1666); Shah Suleiman I (r. 1666–1694)
- Preceded by: Mohammad Beg
- Succeeded by: Shaykh Ali Khan Zanganeh

Mirza Mohammad Mahdi Karaki (Persian: میرزا محمد مهدی کرکی) was an Iranian cleric and statesman, who served as the grand Vizier of the Safavid king (shah) Abbas II (r. 1642–1666), and the latter's son and successor Suleiman I (r. 1666–1694). He was the son of Mirza Habibollah Karaki, who had served as the sadr-e mamalik (minister of religion) from 1632/33 until his death in 1650.

In 1661, Abbas appointed Mirza Mohammad Karaki as his fourth and last grand vizier. Karaki had previously performed satisfactorily as the sadr-e mamalik (minister of religion) and was a member of the prestigious Karaki family that traced its line back to Shaykh Ali al-Karaki, the deputy of the Hidden Imam for Tahmasp I. He was described as a man of inaction, sluggish and impractical, and a puppet of a faction in court. His tenure saw the promotion of trade via the overland route to the Levant. He made an effort to investigate the ongoing specie problem that Mohammad Beg had left behind. However, he was caught up in a domestic crisis. In 1663, he had the qurchi-bashi Murtaza Quli Khan Qajar decapitated and tempted the shah to also execute his successor. Overall, Karaki had a lesser influence over the shah than his predecessor. During his tenure, Abbas spent more time in the inner palace and kept the grand vizier ignorant of his private affairs. Karaki did not even know that the shah had a son named Sam Mirza.

== Citations ==
=== Works cited ===
- Roemer, H. R. (2008). "THE SAFAVID PERIOD". The Cambridge History of Iran, Volume 6: The Timurid and Safavid Periods. Cambridge: Cambridge University Press. pp. 189–350. ISBN 9781139054980. Archived from the original on 3 May 2022.
- Matthee, Rudi (2019). Persia in Crisis: Safavid Decline and the Fall of Isfahan. New York: Taylor & Francis. ISBN 9781000392876. OCLC 1274244049.
- Blow, David (2009). Shah Abbas: The Ruthless King Who became an Iranian Legend. London, UK: I. B. Tauris & Co. Ltd. ISBN 978-1-84511-989-8. LCCN 2009464064.
- Matthee, Rudi (2011). Persia in Crisis: Safavid Decline and the Fall of Isfahan. I.B.Tauris. pp. 1–371. ISBN 978-0857731814.
- Babaie, Sussan (2004). Slaves of the Shah: New Elites of Safavid Iran. I.B.Tauris. pp. 1–218. ISBN 9781860647215.
- Matthee, Rudi (2010). "ḴALIFA SOLṬĀN". Encyclopaedia Iranica, Vol. XV, Fasc. 4. pp. 382–384.
- Newman, Andrew J. (2008). Safavid Iran: Rebirth of a Persian Empire. I.B.Tauris. pp. 1–281. ISBN 9780857716613.
- Savory, Roger (2007). Iran under the Safavids. Cambridge University Press. pp. 1–288. ISBN 978-0521042512.
- Roemer, H.R. (1986). "The Safavid period". The Cambridge History of Iran, Volume 5: The Timurid and Safavid periods. Cambridge: Cambridge University Press. pp. 189–351. ISBN 9780521200943.
- Floor, Willem (2005), "A Note on The Grand Vizierate in Seventeenth Century Persia", Zeitschrift der Deutschen Morgenländischen Gesellschaft, 155 (2), Harrassowitz Verlag: 435–481, JSTOR 43382107
- Nashat, Guity; Beck, Lois (2003). Women in Iran from the Rise of Islam to 1800. University of Illinois Press. pp. 1–253. ISBN 978-0-252-07121-8.

Preceded by Mirza Habibollah Karaki	Sadr-i mamalik 1650 – 1661	Succeeded by Mirza Qavam al-Din Mohammad
Government offices
Preceded by Mohammad Beg	Grand Vizier of the Safavid Empire; 1661 – 1669	Succeeded by Shaykh Ali Khan Zanganeh
