= Safi of Persia =

Safavid Shah of Iran from 1629 to 1642

Safi
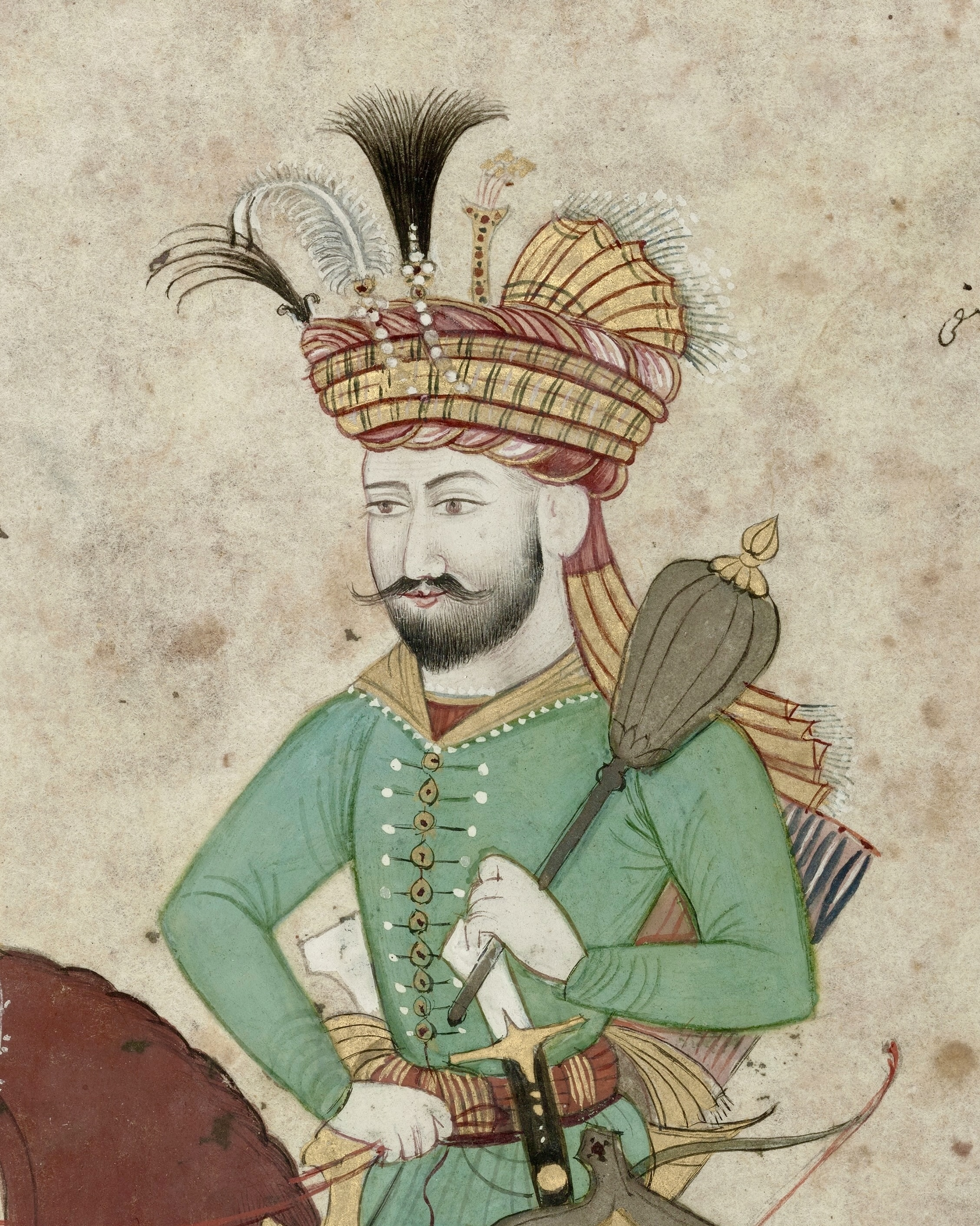
- Safi on horseback carrying a mace. North Indian painting, 18th–19th century

Shah of Iran
- Reign: 28 January 1629 – 12 May 1642
- Coronation: 29 January 1629
- Predecessor: Abbas I
- Successor: Abbas II
- Born: 1611
- Died: 12 May 1642 (aged 30/31); Kashan, Iran
- Burial: Fatima Masumeh Shrine, Qom, Iran
- Spouse: Anna Khanum; Princess Tinatin
- Issue: Abbas II; Maryam Begum; More
Names
- Sam Mirza
- Dynasty: Safavid
- Father: Mohammad Baqer Mirza
- Mother: Dilaram Khanum
- Religion: Twelver Shi'ism

Sam Mirza (Persian: سام میرزا; 1611 – 12 May 1642), known by his regnal name of Shah Safi (Persian: شاه صفی), was the sixth shah of Safavid Iran, ruling from 1629 to 1642. Abbas the Great was succeeded by his grandson, Safi. A reclusive and passive character, Safi was unable to fill the power vacuum which his grandfather had left behind. His officials undermined his authority and revolts constantly broke out across the realm. The continuing war with the Ottoman Empire, started with initial success during Abbas the Great's reign, but ended with the defeat of Iran and the Treaty of Zuhab, which returned much of Iran's conquests in Mesopotamia to the Ottomans.

In order to assert his authority, Safi purged every potential claimant to his throne, including the sons of the Safavid princesses, and the sons of Abbas the Great, who were blinded and thus were unqualified to rule. The purge also saw the deaths of the leading figures of the realm. An example of Safi's cruelty occurred on the night of 20 February 1632, also known as the Bloody Ma'bas (named after Ma'bas), in which he had forty women of the Safavid imperial harem put to death. The last act of his bloodshed was the killing of his grand vizier, Mirza Taleb Khan Ordubadi, who was replaced with a ghulam (military slave) named Mirza Mohammad Taqi Khan, more famously known as Saru Taqi.

As a eunuch, Saru Taqi had access to the royal harem, and used this ability to forge relations with the shah's concubines. He influenced Safi, persuading him to increase the royal domains by passing the Fars province to the crown demesne. He imposed heavy taxes throughout the realm, especially on Isfahan's Armenian population, and investigated the revenue flows of the previous governor of Gilan. He was described as greedy and was accused by Western observers of accepting bribes. In 1634, Saru Taqi appointed his brother, Mohammad Saleh Beg, as the governor of Mazandaran to counteract the Mar'ashi Sayyid line. Saru Taqi's family held the province's governorship until the end of Safi's reign.

Safi died from excessive drinking on 12 May 1642, leaving behind a country smaller than it was when he inherited it. A weak-minded man lacking charisma, Safi manifested many problems that later plagued the Safavid empire during its decline, one of them being not preparing the crown prince for rule. He excluded the Qizilbash influence in Safavid bureaucracy, and instead allowed a coalition of concubines, eunuchs and ghulams to hold power during the last decade of his reign.

== Early life ==
Safi was given the name Sam Mirza when he was born. He was the son of Mohammad Baqer Mirza, the eldest son of Shah Abbas I, and Dilaram Khanum, a Georgian wife. In 1615, Abbas had Mohammed Baqer killed, fearing he was plotting against his life. Over the next few years, the suspicious Abbas killed or blinded his other sons, leaving his grandson Safi heir to the throne.

== Reign ==
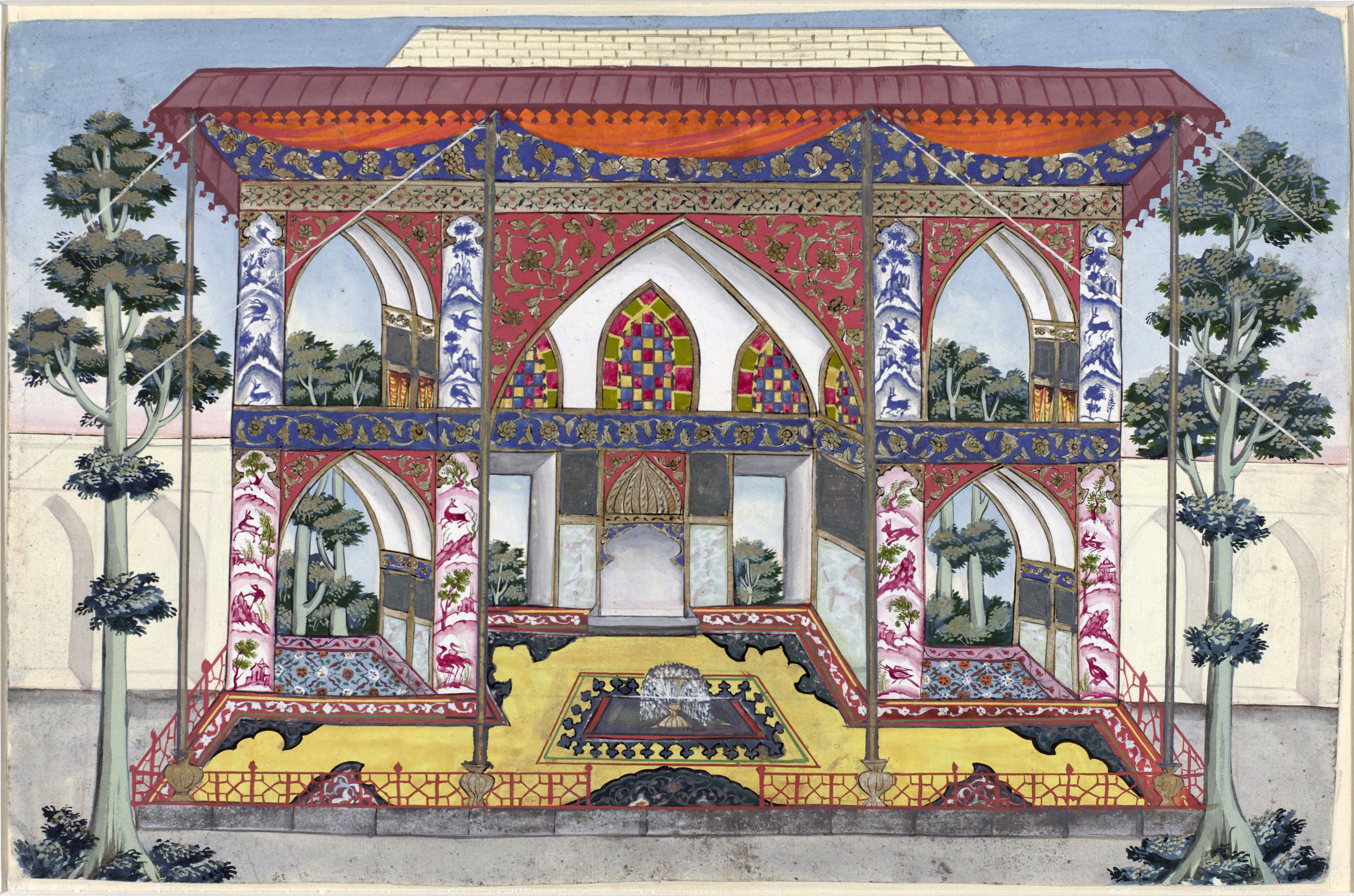
Private Diwan (Court building) of Shah Safi I of Persia.

Safi was crowned on 28 January 1629 at the age of eighteen. He ruthlessly eliminated anyone he regarded as a threat to his power, executing almost all the Safavid royal princes as well as leading courtiers and generals. He paid little attention to the business of government and had no cultural or intellectual interests (he had never learned to read or write properly), preferring to spend his time drinking wine or indulging in his addiction to opium. Supposedly, however, he abhorred tobacco smoke as much as his grandfather did, going as far as to have those caught smoking tobacco in public killed by pouring molten lead in their mouths.

The dominant political figure of Safi's reign was Saru Taqi, appointed grand vizier in 1634. Saru Taqi was incorruptible and highly efficient at raising revenues for the state, but he could also be autocratic and arrogant.

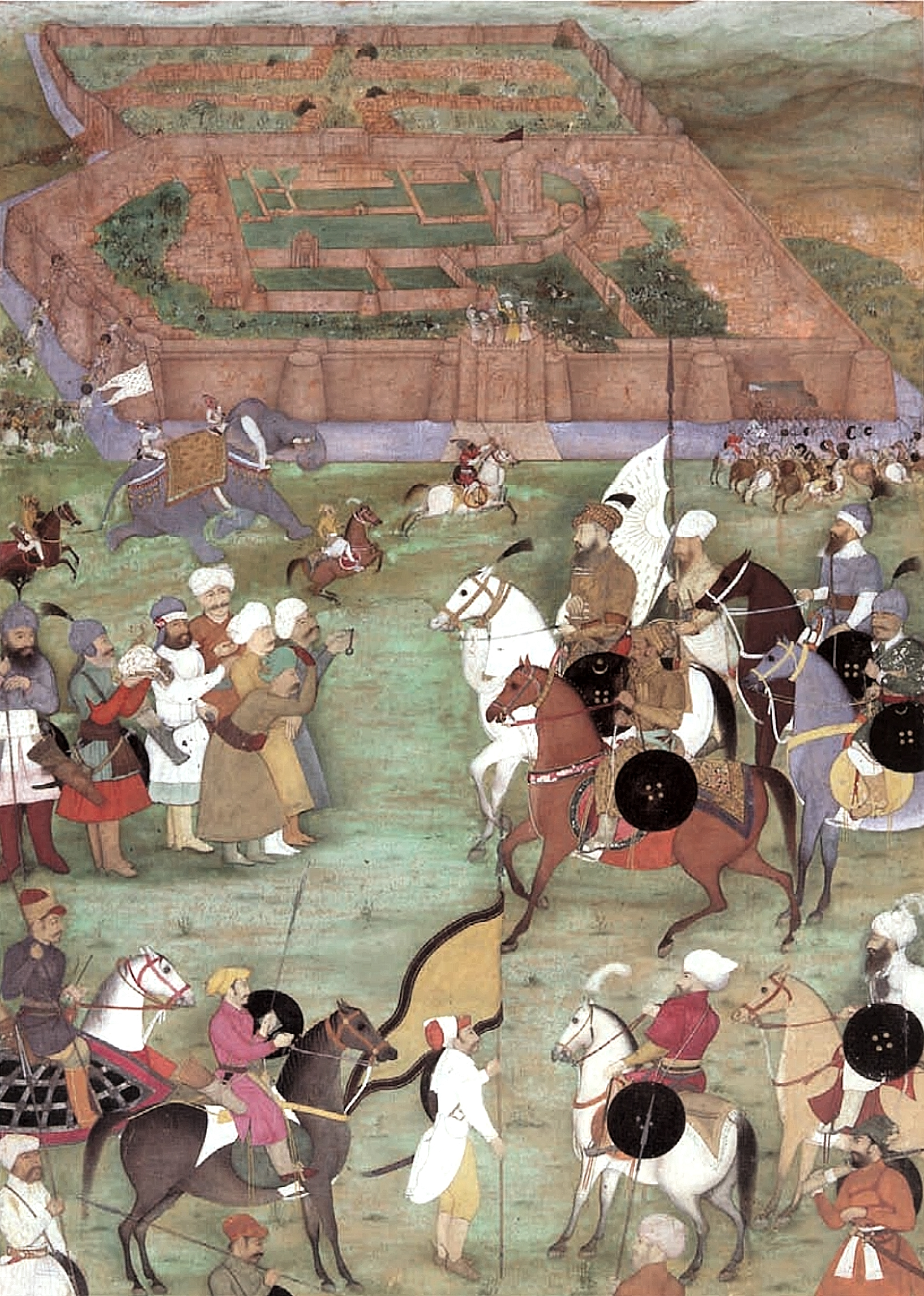
Surrender of the Safavids under Mihrab Khan to the Mughal general Qulij Khan Turani at the Siege of Bost (1638).

Iran's foreign enemies took the opportunity to exploit Safi's perceived weakness. Despite firm initial Safavid successes and humiliating defeats in the Ottoman–Safavid War (1623–1639) by Safi's grandfather and predecessor Shah Abbas the Great, the Ottomans, having had their economy stabilized and military reorganized under the fiercely capable Sultan Murad IV, started making incursions in the west within a year of Safi's ascension to the throne. In 1634 they briefly occupied Yerevan and Tabriz and in 1638 they finally succeeded in recapturing Baghdad and other parts of Mesopotamia (Iraq) which, despite being retaken on several occasions by the Persians, and most notably by Nader Shah, would all remain in their hands until the aftermath of World War I. Nevertheless, the ensuing Treaty of Zuhab of 1639 put an end to all further wars between the Safavids and the Ottomans. Apart from its wars against the Ottomans, Iran was troubled by the Uzbeks and Turkmens in the east and briefly lost Kandahar, in its easternmost territories, to the Mughals in 1638, due to what looks like an act of revenge by its own governor in the region, Ali Mardan Khan, after the latter was dismissed from his office.

In 1636 Safi Shah received a trade delegation from Frederick III, Duke of Holstein-Gottorp, which included Adam Olearius. Olearius wrote a book about this visit in 1647, which was widely published in Europe. In 1639, Safi sent a return delegation to Holstein-Gottorp, bestowing gifts on the Duke. However, the Duke did not succeed in his ultimate aim - starting a regular trading relationship with Iran (and Russia) and making the Duke's newly founded town of Friedrichstadt into a European trade terminus.

Safi died on 12 May 1642 and was buried in Qom. He was succeeded by his son Abbas II. His death was related to heavy drinking. According to one account, found in Archangelo Lamberti's Relation de la Colchide ou Mengrellie (1654), Safi died in a drinking contest with a certain Shedan Chiladze, a renowned Georgian drinking champion invited to Isfahan from Mingrelia.

== Family ==
Consorts

Safi had three wives:

- Anna Khanum (died 9 September 1647), a Circassian, and daughter of Urgurlu Beg, his former slave;
- Princess Tinatin (m. 1634), daughter of Teimuraz I of Kakheti, by his second wife, Queen Khoresan, daughter of George X, King of Kartli;
- A daughter of Bika (m. 1637), a Circassian, and sister of Prince Mussal;

Sons

Safi had five sons:

- Sultan Mohammad Mirza, succeeded regnally as Abbas II;
- Tahmasp Mirza (blinded 1642);
- Bahram Mirza (blinded 1642);
- Sultan Haidar Mirza (blinded 1642);
- Ismail Haidar Mirza (blinded 1642);

Daughters

Safi had two daughters:

- Maryam Begum, married sadr, a grandson of Khalifeh Soltan;
- Pari Rukhsar Khanum, married brother of her sister's husband, the sadr;

== See also ==
- Siege of Erivan (1636)
- Siege of Baghdad (1630)

== Sources ==
- Newman, Andrew J. (2008). Safavid Iran: Rebirth of a Persian Empire. I.B.Tauris. pp. 1–281. ISBN 9780857716613.
- Babaie, Sussan; Babayan, Kathryn; McCabe, Ina Baghdiantz; Farhad, Massumeh (2004). Slaves of the Shah: New Elites of Safavid Iran. London, UK: I. B. Tauris. pp. 1–218. ISBN 1-86064-721-9. LCCN 2005272298.
- Babaie, Sussan (2004). Slaves of the Shah: New Elites of Safavid Iran. I.B.Tauris. pp. 1–218. ISBN 9781860647215.
- Roemer, H.R. (1986). "The Safavid period". The Cambridge History of Iran, Volume 5: The Timurid and Safavid periods. Cambridge: Cambridge University Press. pp. 189–351. ISBN 9780521200943.
- Granlund, Lis (2004). "Queen Hedwig Eleonora of Sweden: Dowager, Builder, and Collector". In Campbell Orr, Clarissa (ed.). Queenship in Europe 1660-1815: The Role of the Consort. Cambridge University Press. pp. 56–76. ISBN 0-521-81422-7.
- Roemer, H. R. (2008). "THE SAFAVID PERIOD". The Cambridge History of Iran, Volume 6: The Timurid and Safavid Periods. Cambridge: Cambridge University Press. pp. 189–350. ISBN 9781139054980. Archived from the original on 3 May 2022.
- Matthee, Rudolph P. (2005). The pursuit of pleasure: drugs and stimulants in Iranian history, 1500-1900. Princeton University Press. ISBN 9780691118550.
- Matthee, Rudi (2021). The Safavid World. New York: Taylor & Francis. ISBN 9781000392876. OCLC 1274244049.
- Matthee, Rudi (1999). The Politics of Trade in Safavid Iran: Silk for Silver, 1600-1730. London: I.B. Tauris. ISBN 9781838607074. OCLC 875467518.
- Matthee, Rudi (2019). Persia in Crisis: Safavid Decline and the Fall of Isfahan. New York: Taylor & Francis. ISBN 9781000392876. OCLC 1274244049.

Safi of Persia Safavid dynasty Born: 1611 Died: 12 May 1642
Iranian royalty
Preceded by Abbas I	Shah of Iran; 1629–1642	Succeeded by Abbas II
