= Allahverdi Khan (Armenian) =

Safavid military officer of Armenian origin (died 1662)

Personal details
- Died: 1662
- Parent: Khosrow Khan

Military service
- Allegiance: Safavid Iran

Allahverdi Khan (Persian: اللّه وردی خان; died 1662) was a Safavid military officer of Armenian origin. He was the son of a certain Khosrow Khan, beglerbeg (governor) of Shirvan and had a brother named Emamverdi Beg.

== Sources ==
- Fleischer, C. (1985). "ALLĀHVERDĪ KHAN (2)". Encyclopaedia Iranica, Vol. I, Fasc. 8. p. 892.
- Floor, Willem M.; Faghfoory, Mohammad H. (2007). The Dastur Al-moluk: A Safavid State Manual, by Mohammad Rafi' al-Din Ansari. Mazda Publishers. pp. 187–188. ISBN 978-1568591957.
- Matthee, Rudolph P. (2009). "Allāh Virdī Khān b. Khusraw Khān". In Fleet, Kate; Krämer, Gudrun; Matringe, Denis; Nawas, John; Rowson, Everett (eds.). Encyclopaedia of Islam (3rd ed.). Brill Online. ISSN 1873-9830.
- Matthee, Rudi (2011). Persia in Crisis: Safavid Decline and the Fall of Isfahan. I.B.Tauris. pp. 1–371. ISBN 978-0857731814.
- Moreen, Vera B. (2010). "Allāhverdī Khān [II]". In Norman A. Stillman (ed.). Encyclopedia of Jews in the Islamic World. Brill Online.
- Newman, Andrew J. (2008). Safavid Iran: Rebirth of a Persian Empire. I.B.Tauris. pp. 1–281. ISBN 9780857716613.
- Savory, Roger (2007). Iran under the Safavids. Cambridge University Press. pp. 1–288. ISBN 978-0521042512.
- Roemer, H.R. (1986). "The Safavid period". The Cambridge History of Iran, Volume 5: The Timurid and Safavid periods. Cambridge: Cambridge University Press. pp. 189–351. ISBN 9780521200943.
