= Zeynal Khan Shamlu =

Safavid dignitary (d. 1630)

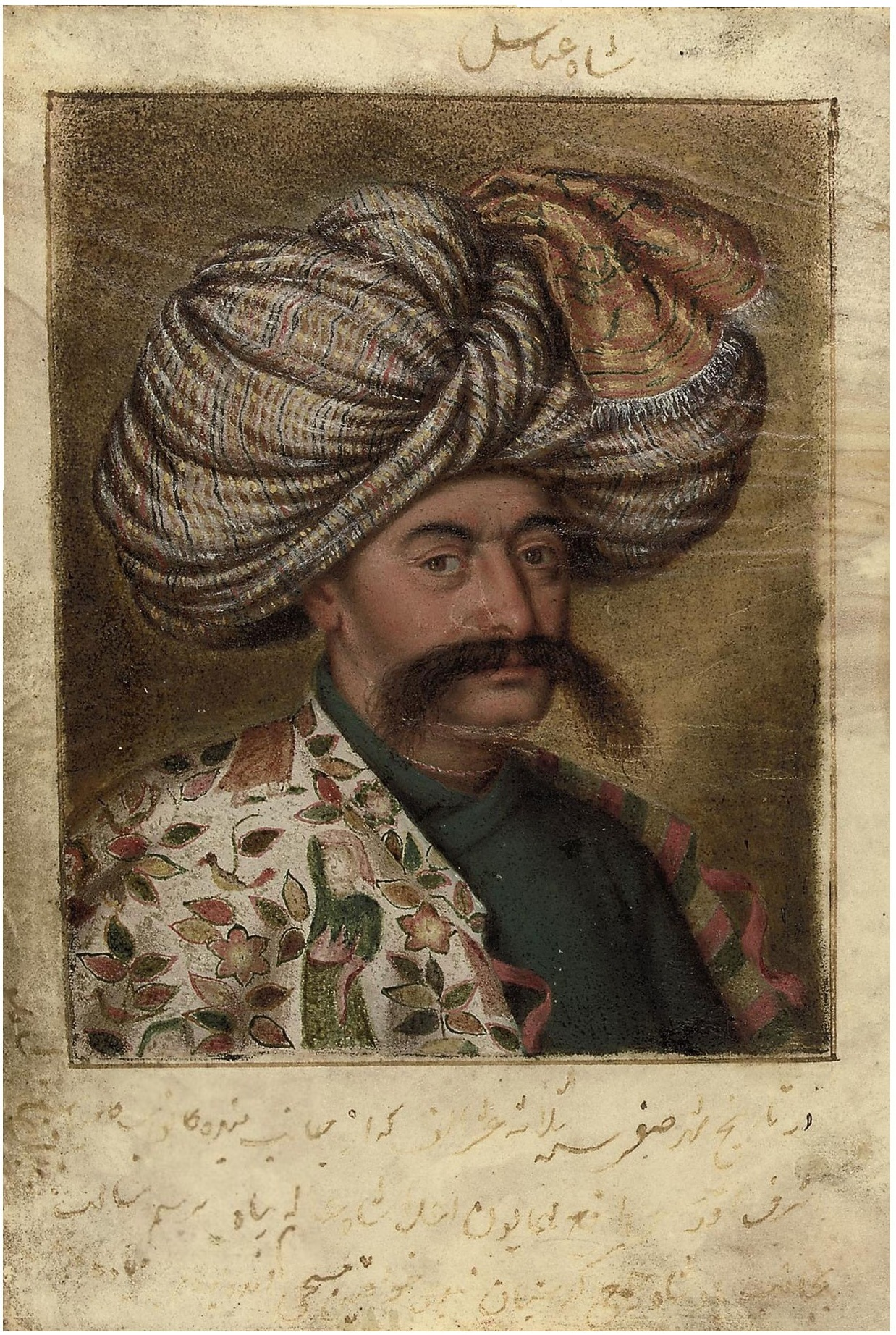
- Portrait of a certain Zeynal Khan Shamlu, likely identical with this person. Made in Prague in July 1604

Vakil of the Safavid Iran
- In office 20/21 March 1629 – 17 July 1630
- Monarch: Shah Safi
- Preceded by: Vacant
- Succeeded by: Vacant

Sepahsalar–e Iran (Commander-in-chief)
- In office Late March 1629 – 17 July 1630
- Monarch: Shah Safi
- Preceded by: →Qarachaqay Khan→Vacant
- Succeeded by: Rostam Khan

Personal details
- Died: 17 July 1630
- Relations: Naqd Ali Beg (cousin)

Zeynal Khan Shamlu (Persian: زینل خان شاملو) was a high-ranking dignitary in Safavid Iran, who served as the vakil (regent) and sepahsalar (commander-in-chief) of Shah Safi (r. 1629–1642) from March 1629 to 17 July 1630. His tenure ended when he was murdered under the orders of Shah Safi for suffering a military defeat against the Ottoman Empire.

== Biography ==
=== Under Shah Abbas I (r. 1587–1629) ===
Zeynal Khan Shamlu was a member of the Shamlu tribe. He was a cousin of Naqd Ali Beg, who was sent as an ambassador to England in 1626–27. Zeynal Khan was likely the same Zeynal Khan Shamlu who had been sent as an ambassador the Holy Roman Emperor Rudolf II in 1604. In 1620, he was sent as an ambassador to the court of the Mughal Empire. From 1625 until an unknown date, he served as the governor of the city of Ray, succeeding Aliqoli Beg Geramillu Shamlu.

Zeynal Khan was closely associated with Zeynab Begum, the aunt of Shah Abbas I (r. 1587–1629). The Qizilbash's traditional loyalty and reverence for the Safavid family had established this close bond. Zeynab Begum held personal connections to the Shamlu tribe through her mentor Shah Ali Beg and her previous marriage to Ali-Qoli Khan Shamlu. Following the death of Shah Abbas I, Zeynal Khan and Zeynab Begum worked together in the Mazandaran province to secure support for Safi by collection signatures from high-ranking officials.

=== Under Shah Safi (r. 1629–1642) ===
When Shah Safi ascended the throne on 29 January 1629, Zeynal Khan served as the eshik-aqasi-bashi (master of ceremonies) of the divan, which he would hold until 1630. At the time of Shah Safi's accession, several high-ranking figures sought to expand their influence by exploiting his inexperience. The most important of these figures were Zeynal Khan, Isa Khan Shaykhavand, Khalifeh Soltan, Rostam Khan and Abo'l-Qasem Teymur Beg Ev-oghli.

On 20 or 21 March 1629, during Nowruz (Iranian New Year), Zeynal Khan was appointed as the vakil (regent) of the realm. His appointment was possibly a requirement made by Zeynab Begum in exchange for her returning to the harem, which she had done 10 days before. A few days later, he was appointed as sepahsalar (commander-in-chief) due to his close relationship with Shah Safi, which allowed him to further increase his authority and renown. Beforehand, the sepahsalar office had been vacant since 1626, and the vakil office since 1588.

In early May 1630, Zeynal Khan was defeated by the Ottoman Empire at the Battle of Marivan. As a result, he was killed under the orders of Shah Safi. It was carried on 17 July 1630 out by an old eunuch of the harem, Bahram. To discourage treason and military weakness, Zeynal Khan's severed head was displayed on a stake in the military camp. Rostam Khan, for his subsequent victories against the Ottomans, was later appointed as sepahsalar. The vakil office remained vacant until 1722.

== Sources ==
- Babaie, Sussan; Babayan, Kathryn; Baghdiantz-McCabe, Ina; Farhad, Massumeh (2004). Slaves of the Shah: New Elites of Safavid Iran. I.B. Tauris. ISBN 978-1860647215.
- Babayan, Kathryn (1993). The Waning of the Qizilbash: The Spiritual and the Temporal in Seventeenth Century Iran. Princeton University.
- Floor, Willem (2001). Safavid Government Institutions. Mazda Publishers. ISBN 978-1568591353.
- Floor, Willem (2008). Titles and Emoluments in Safavid Iran: A Third Manual of Safavid Administration, by Mirza Naqi Nasiri. Mage Publishers. ISBN 978-1933823232.
- Matthee, Rudi (2011). Persia in Crisis: Safavid Decline and the Fall of Isfahan. I.B. Tauris. ISBN 978-0857731814.
- Matthee, Rudi (2021). "Ṣafi I, Shah". In Yarshater, Ehsan (ed.). Encyclopædia Iranica (Online ed.). Encyclopædia Iranica Foundation. ISBN 978-9004472907.
- Newman, Andrew J. (2006). Safavid Iran: Rebirth of a Persian Empire. I.B. Tauris. ISBN 978-0857716613.
- Rota, Giorgio (2021). "Diplomatic relations between Safavid Iran and Europe". In Matthee, Rudi (ed.). The Safavid World. Routledge. pp. 588–609. ISBN 978-1138944060.

Preceded by Aliqoli Beg Geramillu Shamlu	Governor of Ray; 1625–?	Succeeded by Emamqoli Beg yuz-bashi-ye Enanlu Shamlu
Preceded by Unknown	Eshik-aqasi-bashi of the divan ?–1630	Succeeded by Oghurlu Khan
Preceded by Vacant	Vakil (regent); 20/21 March 1629 – 17 July 1630	Succeeded by Vacant
Preceded by Vacant	Sepahsalar (commander-in-chief); Late March 1629 – 17 July 1630	Succeeded by Rostam Khan
