= Greenbury =

Greenbury is a surname and a given name, which may refer to:

Surname:

- Christopher Greenbury (1951–2007), British film editor
- Richard Greenbury (1936–2017), British businessman
- Robert Greenbury (1600–1650), English painter

Given name:

- Greenbury L. Fort (1825–1883), American politician, U.S. Representative from Illinois
- Greenbury Purnell (1794–1857), American railroad executive
- Greenbury Ridgely Henry (1828–1885), American founding member of Phi Alpha Literary Society

== See also ==
- The Greenbury Report (1995) on corporate governance
- Greenbury Point Light, the name of two lighthouses in Chesapeake Bay, United States
- Greenberry (disambiguation)
- Greensburg (disambiguation)
- Grünburg
