= Arabgirlu tribe =

The Arabgirlu was a Kurdish tribe in Safavid Iran that joined the Shamlu tribe of the Qizilbash confederacy during the reign of Shah Abbas I (r. 1587–1629). Their incorporation into the tribe took place when they were sent to Khorasan to defend the Safavid border against the Khanate of Bukhara. The Arabgirlu were in close proximity to the Safavid shah, as they held a number of important, often hereditary, positions in the palace (ilchi, rekabdar, vazir-e qurchiyan-e khassa, eshik-aqasi-bashi, and evji-bashi). They served the Safavids until their downfall.

== Sources ==
- Dehqan, Mustafa; Genç, Vural (2024). "The Qizilbash Reconsidered: The Role of the Kurdish Arabgirlu Tribe in the Early Safavid State". In Winter, Stéfan; HajHasan, Zainab (eds.). Syrian-Kurdish Intersections in the Ottoman Period. University of Toronto Press. ISBN 978-1487554408.
