= Abo'l-Qasem Teymur Beg Ev-oghli =

Abo'l-Qasem Teymur Beg Ev-oghli (Persian: ابوالقاسم تیمور بیگ اوغلی) was the eshik-aqasi-bashi of the Safavid imperial harem from 1617 to 1629. He was a member of the gholam Ev-oghli family.

== Sources ==
- Babayan, Kathryn Babayan (1998). "Ev-oḡlī family". In Yarshater, Ehsan (ed.). Encyclopædia Iranica (Online ed.). Encyclopædia Iranica Foundation. ISBN 978-0933273351.
