= Dımışkılı (tribe) =

Turkoman tribe

Regions with significant populations
- Turkey: Kilis, Gaziantep, Konya, Ankara; Syria: Damascus

Languages
- Turkish

Religion
- Sunni Islam

Related ethnic groups
- Turkish people, Syrian Turkmen

Dımışkılı is a Turkoman tribe mostly inhabiting Kilis and Gaziantep provinces in south-central Turkey.

== Etymology ==
Although Damascus is known as Şam in standardized Turkish, Dımışk (i.e. Dimashq) was also used to refer to the city in the archaic tongue and regional dialects. Dımışkı means Damascene, while Dımışkılı means "possessing Damascenes," referring to the tribe's migration from the vicinity of Damascus.

== History ==
Proposed to be related with the Shamlu tribe, Dımışkılı tribe initially inhabited the vicinity of Sivas with 700 tents. During the 16th century, the Ottomans banished the tribe from this region. Later, the tribe came into contact with the initially-friendly Kurdish Reshwan tribe. Though, Dımışkılı and Reshwan tribes eventually got into conflict. According to Dımışkılı tribesmen, the Reshwans wanted to loot Dımışkılı tribesmen's property and violated their firman. Moreover, the Reshwan tribe reached out to the Ottoman sultan and denounced the tribe, captured 400 cattle and 500 tribesmen, and banished them to Damascus. The tribe later migrated north to Kilis and Gaziantep.
