= Robe of honour =

Garments historically given by Islamic rulers

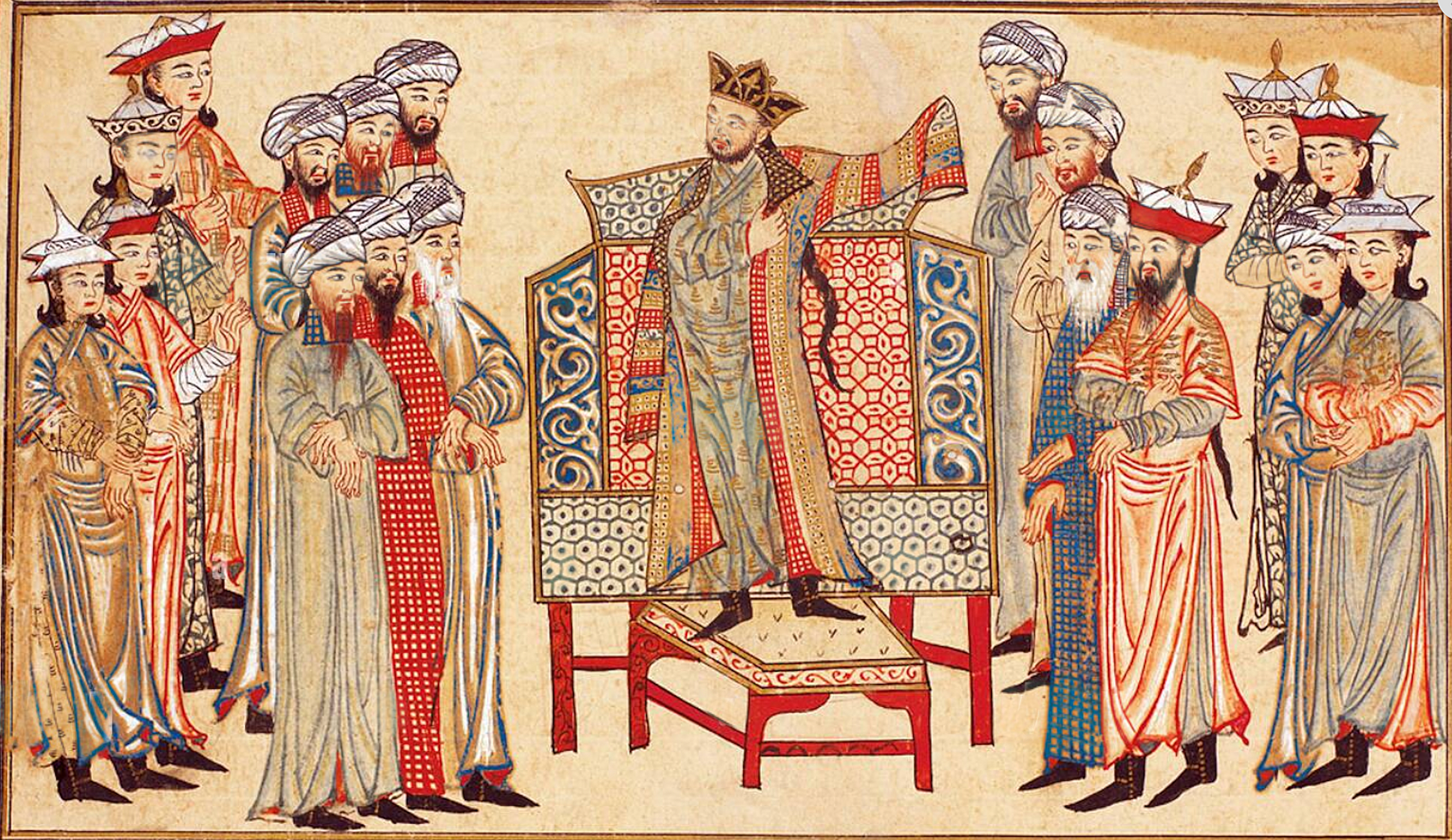
Mahmud of Ghazni dons a robe of honour sent by the Abbasid caliph al-Qadir

Detail of a Safavid coat, probably a robe of honor, in the Swedish armory, Stockholm

A robe of honour (Arabic: خلعة, romanized: khilʿa, plural khilaʿ, or Arabic: تشريف, romanized: tashrīf, pl. tashārif or tashrīfāt) were rich garments given by medieval and early modern Islamic rulers to subjects as tokens of honour, often as part of a ceremony of appointment to a public post, or as a token of confirmation or acceptance of vassalage of a subordinate ruler. They were usually produced in government factories and decorated with the inscribed bands known as ṭirāz. Were made of either (indigenous or foreign) high quality silks, gold-interwoven, figured, or plain silk cloth, circulation of the garments were in limited quantities.

== History ==
The endowment of garments as a mark of favor is an ancient Middle Eastern tradition, recorded in sources such as the Hebrew Bible and Herodotus.

In the Iranian world, gifting of robes of honor dates back to the Achaemenid period, having been a staple of Imperial Iranian culture, with the king and princes bestowing robes of honor during ceremonies held in public, particularly during Nowruz, at the royal court or major events in exchange for services rendered to the state and as a means of sustaining loyalty, with the so-called Median robes, their color indicating rank, having been particularly prized. The robes were woven in royal workshops with Khuzestan having been a center of Sassanian textile production, while the practice itself continued throughout Iranian history up until the 20th century.

In the Islamic world, Muhammad himself set a precedent when he removed his cloak (burda) and gave it to Ka'b ibn Zuhayr in recognition of a poem praising him. Indeed, the term khilʿa "denotes the action of removing one's garment in order to give it to someone".

Neither the Rashidun caliphs or the Damascene Umayyad caliphs are known to have given robes of honor. It is only with the Abbasids of Baghdad that robes of honor were of great importance in the Islamic world. As a custom, the presentation of robes of honor was likely inspired by Byzantine and Sassanian Persian robes of honor.

The practice of awarding robes of honour appears in the Abbasid Caliphate, where it became such a regular feature of government that ceremonies of bestowal occurred almost every day, and the members of the caliph's court became known as 'those who wear the khilʿa' (aṣḥāb al-khilʿa). The bestowal of garments became a fixed part of any investment into office, from that of a governor to the heir-apparent to the throne. As important court occasions, these events were often commemorated by poets and recorded by historians.

Manufacturing tiraz robes could only be done by the Abbasid caliph. Much as coins were a symbol of caliphal authority, robes of honor were also a powerful symbol as well that could only be bestowed by royalty. The workshops to weave tiraz were located at the city of Bishapur in Iran, but with the weakening of Abbasid power and diffusion of weaving technologies, they were later woven in Baghdad, where they continued to be presented by the caliph until the Mongol sack of Baghdad in 1258.

In Egypt, during the Fatimid Caliphate, the practice spread to the wealthy upper middle classes, who began conferring robes of honor on friends and relatives, in emulation of the aristocracy. Later, under the Mamluk Sultanate, the system was standardized into a system of classes reflecting the divisions of Mameluke society, each with its own ranks: the military (arbāb al-suyūf), the civilian bureaucracy (arbāb al-aqlām), and the religious scholars (al-ʿulamāʾ).

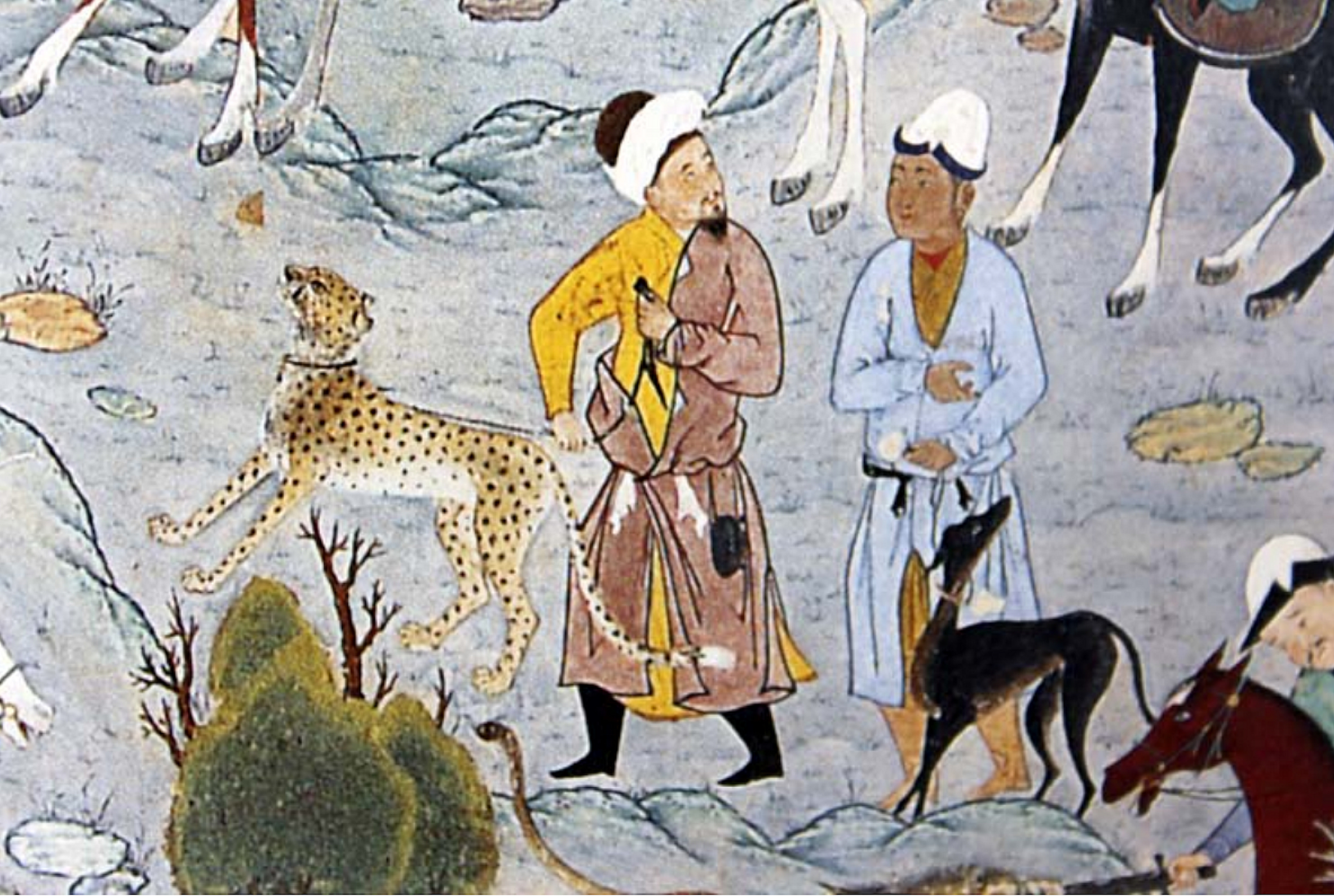
A Royal Hunting Scene, attributed to Bihzad (detail). Hasht Bihisht of Amir Khosrow Dihlavi, Topkapı Palace Museum Library, Istanbul, H.676, frontispiece, fol. 2r (1496)

Militaristic values in daily life under the Mamluk Sultanate offered a new perspective on the ceremonial importance of robes of honor. It became the sultan's duty to provide and host lavish events for his subjects. Specifically, robes of honour were given as rewards for military rituals of everyday life, such as tournaments in horseback archery. The aforementioned military rituals could also reward a slave their freedom, so earning a robe of honour can be seen equivalent to a slave becoming a freedman. This established not only how robes of honor were rewarded to those upholding these militaristic values, but also shows how one’s freedom was earned by upholding these principles, however, it meant a whole new set of responsibilities for those who received a robe of honor. Those receiving a robe of honor were expected to begin a new career pursuing administrative, military, or courtly duties in subservience of the sultan. The color of the robes of honour dictated one’s position in society, red over a yellow atlas for senior amirs, white silk chenille for bureaucracy, and white wool for judges. The Sultan would often host hunting trips, providing robes of honour for any fiefdom he stopped at along his journey.

In India, robes of honor were considered to be a way to symbolically bind vassals to the service of the Mughal emperor. The Mughal Emperor Akbar presented a robe of honor to a rebellious vassal, the ruler of Bengal, Da'ud Khan Karrani. In his memoirs, the Jahangirnama, the Mughal Emperor Jahangir mentions giving at least 300 robes of honor to various subjects and vassals. A Mughal robe of honor presented to Raja Rai Singh of Bikaner in 1597 by Prince Salim (later known as Jahangir) is still in Bikaner, the only known surviving garment that can be securely connected to the early Mughal court.

By the early to mid 18th century, the Mughal empire fragmented. Muhammad Shah, the Mughal ruler who was first devastated by invasions of northern India by Afshar Persian, Durrani Afghan, or Maratha forces, gave a robe of honor to his noble Muzaffar Khan. When Khan was defeated in battle and faced a mutiny, he sent back his robe of honor, to show that he no longer was in the emperor’s service, and he donned the robes of an ascetic.

The Emperor Ahmad Shah Bahadur, successor to Muhammad Shah, appointed his infant son, who was one year old, as his deputy in Lahore, the Mughal capital of Punjab, and khillat robes of “appropriate size” for the toddler were given to him.

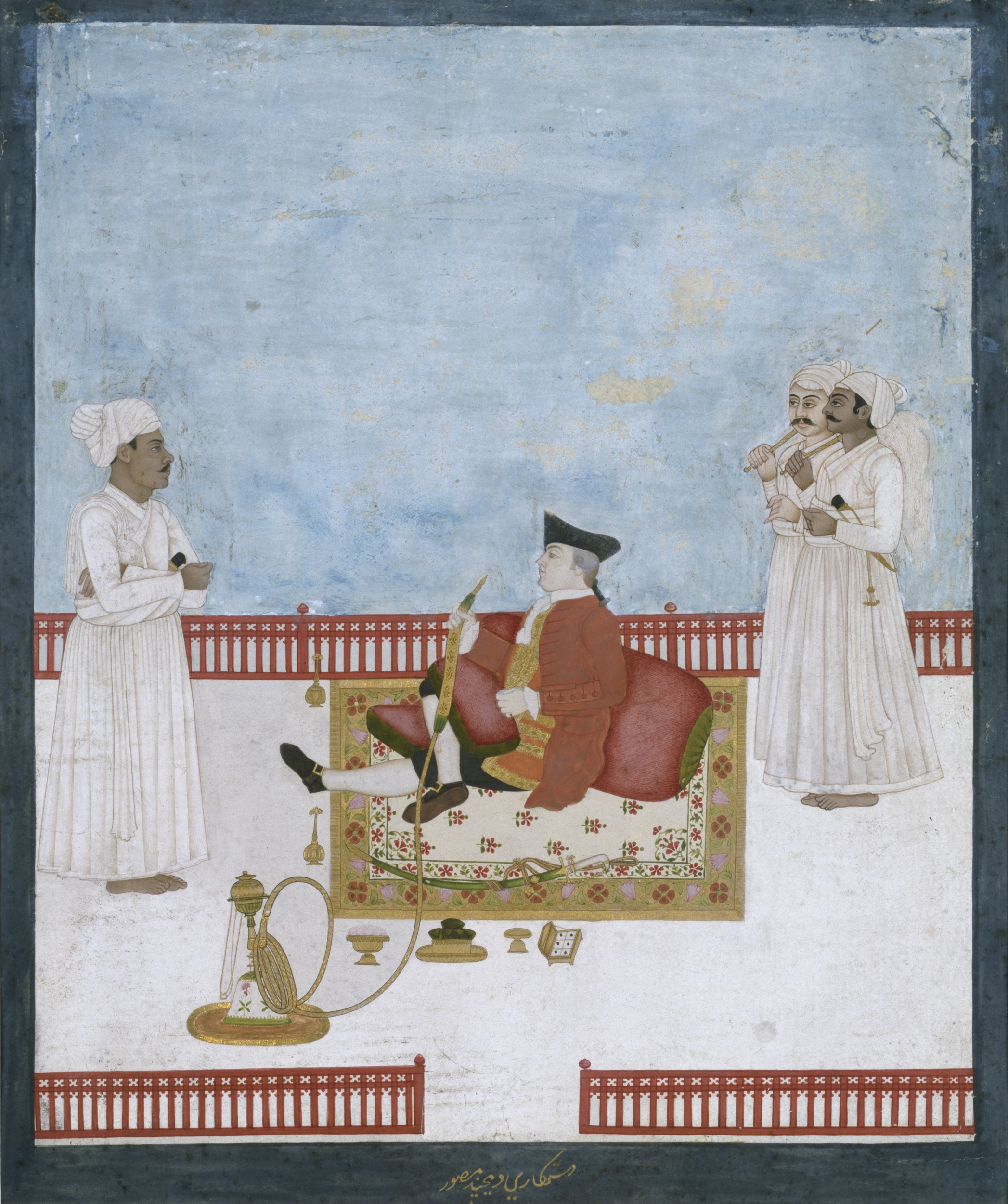
William Fullerton of Rosemount, EIC surgeon in Patna and mayor of Calcutta, receiving a visitor, attended by servants with fly-whisks, 1764. Victoria and Albert Museum, London

In colonial era India, robes of honour fulfilled multiple functions such as being a staple of political court, as well as serving as an extension of the giver to the recipient, and encapsulated the status and circle of influence of those in power. For example, robes of honour in India became a necessity for the vastly changing court life and certain aspects of trading. However, countries expanding their colonial influence, barred and censored robes of honour within their sphere of dominance. This is because robes of honour were often viewed with negative contexts to these imperial powers, as a practice perceived equal to that of bribery. Essentially because robes of honour were above all an admission of submission of the recipient to the provider. Colonial powers began to understand this practice and wanted to keep the tradition behind the action of gift giving to earn the loyalty of the recipient. This practice was remodeled to use other commodities, such as painted portraits. For example, the first Governor-General Warren Hastings (1772-1785) ordered British portraitists to indigenous courts to create portraits of Indian rulers and sent them to English East India Company authorities as a gift. These gifted portraits were successful in establishing English East India Company connections throughout the wealthy kingdoms of Mysore, Awadh, the Carnatic, and the Deccan. Ultimately, colonial powers sought to hijack this ceremonious gift giving process while establishing their own social circles with their own manufactured goods.

Sums of money or other valuables were also given as part of the bestowal ceremony, or, in some cases, in lieu of the robe. In the Ottoman Empire, such a sum was known as khilʿet behā ('price of khilʿa'); most commonly this referred to the donativum received by the Janissaries on the accession of a new sultan.

The distribution of the robes of honour was the responsibility of the Keeper of the Privy Purse (nāẓir al-khāṣṣ), who supervised the Great Treasury (al-khizāna al-kubra), where the garments were stored. Al-Maqrizi provides a detailed description of the garments worn by the various classes and ranks; in addition, Mamluk practice included the bestowal of arms or even a fully outfitted horse from the Sultan's own stables as a tashrīf. The practice remained very common until the early 20th century; in 19th-century India, the bestowal gift or khillaut (khelat, khilut, or killut) might comprise from five up to 101 articles of clothing.

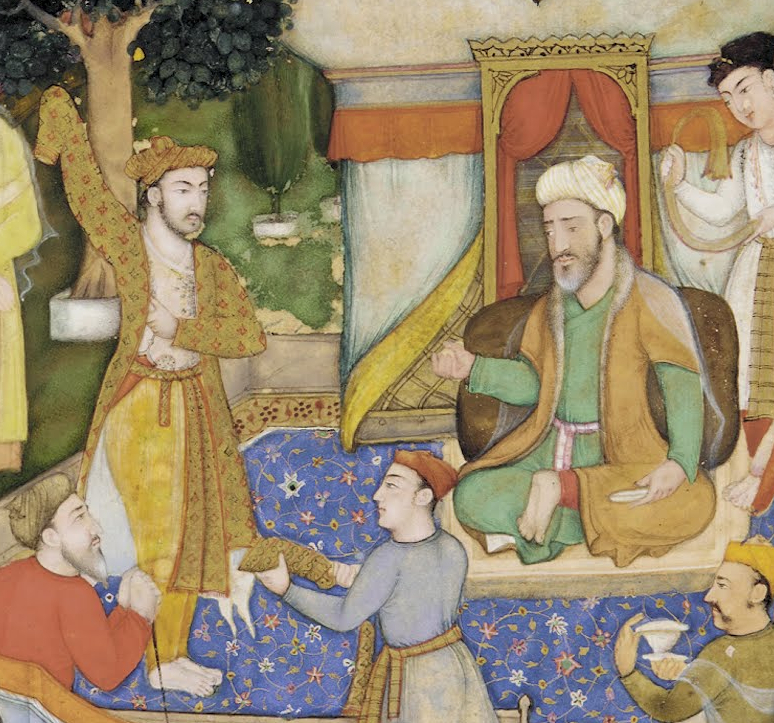
After rebelling against the Mughals, Da'ud, vassal ruler of Bengal, was given a robe of honor. Da'ud awkwardly tries to fit into the robe of honor, suggesting his reluctance to submit to Mughal authority

Due to the earlier, 1427 invasion of Cyprus by the Mamluk Sultanate, Caterina Corner, last queen of the Lusignan dynasty of Cyprus, who ruled from 1474 to 1489, was a Mamluk vassal, and her overlord was Sultan Qaitbay. Cypriot ambassadors who traveled to Cairo were given ceremonial robes to wear in audience with the sultan. Upon her coronation, Caterina was given rich presents by the Mamluk sultan, including a robe of honor trimmed with fur and woven with gold, Arabian horses, Syrian incense burners, and Chinese porcelain. According to the Flemish nobleman and traveller, Joos van Ghistele, such gifts showed that the sultan "holds the king or queen of Cyprus as his slave, who cannot possess riches except with his permission". The weaving of robes of honor was done on a grand scale within the Sultanate due to gifts such as these.

As the practice spread in the Muslim world, and robes began to be given for every conceivable occasion, they also acquired distinct names. Thus for example the khilaʿ al-wizāra ('robe of the vizierate') would be given on the appointment to the vizierate, while the khilaʿ al-ʿazl ('robe of dismissal') upon an—honorable—dismissal, the khilaʿ al-kudūm might be given to an arriving guest, while the khilaʿ al-safar would to a departing guest, etc.

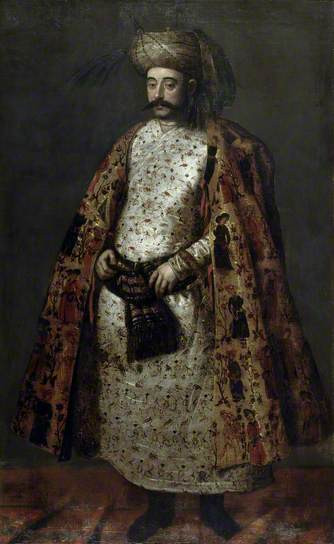
Naqd Ali Beg, a Persian ambassador sent by Shah Abbas to England in 1626, is depicted wearing a velvet robe of honor embroidered with figural motifs over a robe woven with silver threads

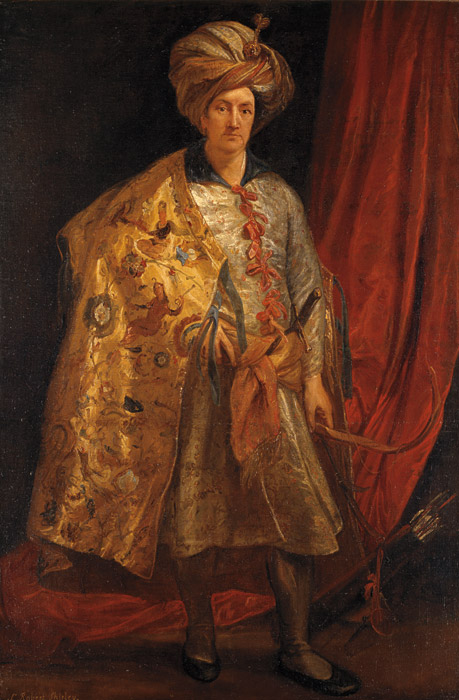
Sir Robert Shirley, English ambassador, wears a robe of honor with figural motifs given to him by the Safavid ruler Shah Abbas

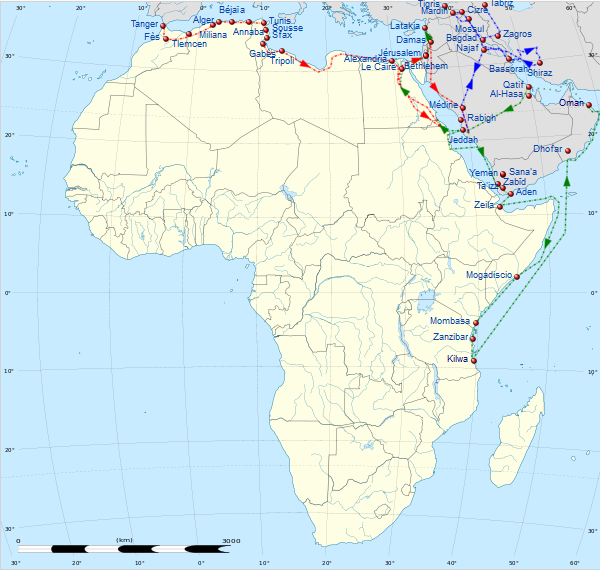
The map of Ibn Battuta Journey from 1325-1354

As opposed to the Arabic word khilat, meaning "cast-off", in the Persianate cultural sphere, robes of honor were referred to as sarāpā, or "head-to-foot", referring to the complete ensemble of gifts given to someone favored by the ruler.In Safavid Persia, richly embroidered robes of honor were bestowed on ambassadors, such as Sir Robert Shirley (a portrait by Van Dyck shows Shirley in Persian dress, wearing his Safavid robe of honor) and Nakd 'Ali Beg. A surviving Safavid coat or robe of honor given to Queen Christina of Sweden is in the Royal Treasury Museum in Sweden.

In Qajar Iran in the 19th century, Kashmir shawls imported from India were frequently used to fashion robes of honor. Mughal emperors had given Kashmiri shawls as gifts, but they took on a new significance in Qajar Iran as robes of honor in their own right. The Qajar shahs gave robes of honor as gifts until the early 20th century, by which point European fashions predominated at court and older state customs, such as the gift of robes of honor, came to an end when the dynasty itself ceased to exist. The Pahlavi dynasty did not continue the tradition.

== Ibn Battuta ==
The 14th-century Maghrebi traveler Ibn Battuta was employed as a lawyer and ambassador at various courts. In his travel writings, the Rihla, he gives an invaluable record various robes of honor presented to him by myriad rulers: Mongol khans, Swahili coast sultans, Turkish beys, Chinese merchants, the Delhi sultan Muhammad bin Tughluq, and even the Byzantine emperor, Andronikos III.

The Delhi sultan is mentioned as having over 4,000 weavers at work in the imperial workshop, or kharkhana. Fabric to make royal garments and gift clothes was woven in India but also included silk imported from China as well as cloth imported from Egypt (evidence of a lively trade in Indian cloth comes from Gujarati cotton fragments discovered in Fustat, old Cairo). Weavers embroidered the imported cloth with jewels and rich motifs in cloth of gold and cloth of silver, although barely any royal clothing from the Delhi Sultanate or pre-Mughal India survives today.

Sultan Muhammad bin Tughluq was known as a contrary man, almost mad, and his nickname was “The Wisest Fool”. Notes Battuta: “He was far too free in shedding blood”, and even venerable holy men and sayyids were executed by the paranoid sultan. Paradoxically, however, the sultan could also be extremely generous. For this reason, as well as curiosity, Ibn Battuta travelled to northern India in either 1330 or 1332. He brought along rich presents with him, knowing that the sultan would present him with gifts of far greater value in return, including robes of honor. Ibn Battuta was made a judge with a high salary.

Unfortunately, Muhammad Bin Tughluq’s mood negatively shifted and Ibn Battuta was exiled. Fearing for his life, he asked to leave, but the sultan made him a superb offer: be an ambassador travelling to the Yuan Dynasty in China, where he would present gifts to the emperor. The sultan accepted his offer, but Ibn Battuta and the embassy’s ships were captured by pirates. After a meandering journey through the south Indian coast, the Maldives Islands, and southeast Asia, he arrived in China years later, where Ibn Battuta was presented with a robe of honor and many other gifts by a rich Muslim merchant.

In Constantinople, Ibn Battuta wrote that the Byzantine emperor Andronikos III “bestowed upon me a robe of honour and assigned me a horse with saddle and bridle, and an umbrella of the kind which the king has carried above his head, that being a sign of protection… They have a custom that anyone who wears the king's robe of honour and rides his horse is paraded round with trumpets, fifes and drums, so that the people may see him. They do this mostly with the Turks who come from the territories of Sultan Uzbeg, so that the people may not molest them, and I was paraded in this fashion through the bazaars.”

Ibn Battuta received the garment from Sultan Muhammad Bin Tughluq when he joined the Sultan services, indicating his recognition as a jurist and scholar within the Delhi court.

The rich gifts Ibn Battuta was presented with in other places are compared positively with what Ibn Battuta felt were meager presents received in Timbuktu in West Africa, towards the end of his life. “The sultan of Mali… is a miserly king, not a man from whom one might hope for a rich present. [I had thought that the presents] consisted of robes of honour and money… [but] it was three cakes of bread, and a piece of beef fried in native oil, and a calabash of sour curds. When I saw this I burst out laughing, and thought it a most amazing thing that they could… make so much of such a paltry matter.”

== See also ==
- Tiraz
- Chelengk
- Khalat

== Sources ==
- Mayer, Leo Ary (1952). Mamluk Costume: A Survey. A. Kundig.
- Stillmann, N. A. (1986). "K̲h̲ilʿa". In Bosworth, C. E.; van Donzel, E.; Lewis, B. & Pellat, Ch. (eds.). The Encyclopaedia of Islam, Second Edition. Volume V: Khe–Mahi. Leiden: E. J. Brill. pp. 6–7. doi:10.1163/1573-3912_islam_COM_0507. ISBN 978-90-04-07819-2.
- Stillman, Yedida Kalfon (2003). Norman A. Stillman (ed.). Arab Dress, A Short History: From the Dawn of Islam to Modern Times (Revised Second ed.). Leiden and Boston: Brill. ISBN 978-90-04-11373-2.
- ORIAS. “Delhi, the Capital of Muslim India: 1334–1341.” University of California, Berkeley https://orias.berkeley.edu/resources-teachers/travels-ibn-battuta/journey/delhi-capital-muslim-india-1334-1341
- ORIAS. “Travels of Ibn Battuta.” University of California, Berkeley https://orias.berkeley.edu/resources-teachers/travels-ibn-battuta
- Al Jazeera. “Why Was Messi Wearing a Bisht at World Cup Ceremony?” Al Jazeera, December 19, 2022 https://www.aljazeera.com/news/2022/12/19/why-was-messi-wearing-a-bisht-at-world-cup-ceremony
