= Zeynab Begum =

Fourth daughter of Safavid king Tahmasp I (r. 1524-1576), major Safavid stateswoman

Zeynab Begum زینب بیگم
- Died: 31 May 1640; Qazvin, Safavid Iran
- Burial: Imam Reza shrine, Mashhad
- Spouse: Ali-Qoli Khan Shamlu
- Dynasty: Safavid
- Father: Tahmasp I
- Mother: Huri-Khan Khanum
- Religion: Shia Islam

Zeynab Begum (Note: Also spelled "Zainab" or "Zaynab".) (Persian: زینب بیگم; died 31 May 1640) was an Iranian princess. The fourth daughter of Safavid king (shah) Tahmasp I (r. 1524–1576), she is considered to be one of the most influential and powerful princesses of the Safavid era. She lived during the reigns of five successive Safavid monarchs, and apart from holding diverse functions, including at the top of the empire's bureaucratic system, she was also the leading matriarch in the royal harem for many years, and acted on occasion as kingmaker. She reached the apex of her influence during the reign of King Safi (r. 1629–1642). In numerous contemporaneous sources, she was praised as a "mainstay of political moderation and wisdom in Safavid court politics". She was eventually removed from power by Safi in 1632.

== Early life ==
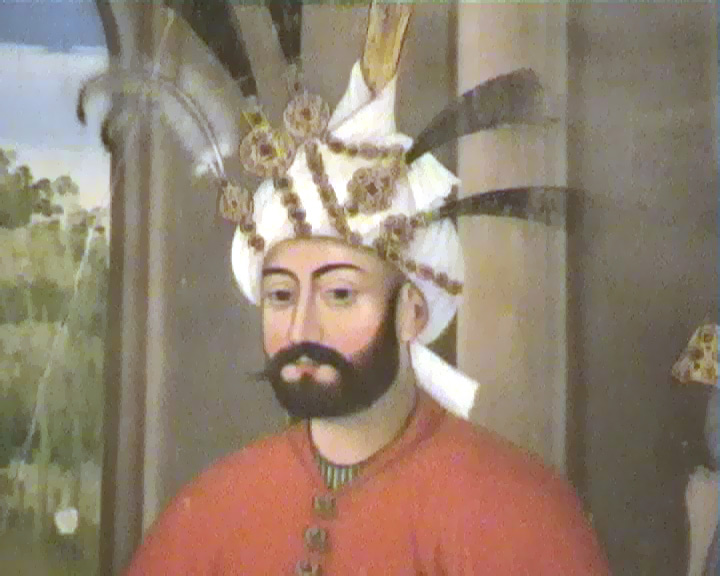
Painting of Tahmasp I at the Chehel Sotoun palace

Zeynab Begum was born to one of Tahmasp's Georgian wives, a princess named Huri-Khan Khanum. Her date of birth is unknown. At a young age, Zeynab Begum was assigned a guardian (laleh), Shah-Qoli Beg, a high-ranking member of the Shamlu Qizilbash faction. When her father died in 1576 and was succeeded by Ismail II (r. 1576–1577), she was given in marriage to Ali-Qoli Khan Shamlu, a grandson of Durmish Khan Shamlu. The marriage took place not long before 7 December 1577, but it was apparently never consummated, for Zeynab Begum continued to live in the royal harem in the Safavid capital of Qazvin.

She played a pivotal role by her support of her nephew, heir-apparent Hamzeh Mirza. According to a report by Iskandar Beg Munshi, Zeynab Begum stood at the head of the royal harem during the frantic civil war that had engulfed the empire in the late 1580s, amidst the Ottoman–Safavid War of 1578–1590. In the period after Hamzeh Mirza's assassination in late 1586, she was assisted by her personal vizier, Mirza Lotfollah Shirazi, who later became grand vizier of the entire state. Thereafter, she functioned as one of the most important supporters of the young prince Abbas (later known by his regnal name of Abbas I; r. 1588–1629) during the war of succession that had commenced during the last few years of King Mohammad Khodabanda (r. 1578–1587).

== Consolidation on the political theatre ==
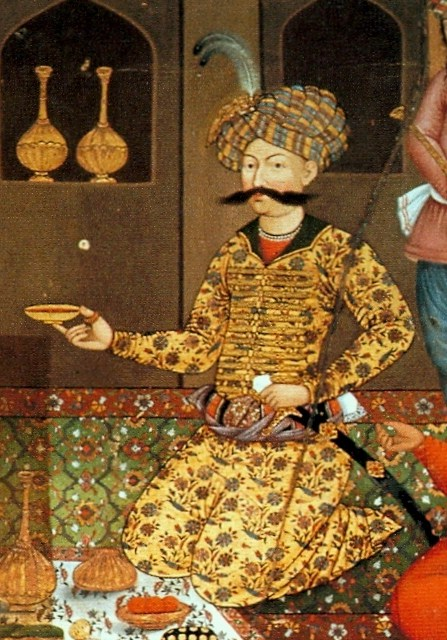
Painting of Abbas I at the Chehel Sotoun palace

In the first years of Abbas's reign, Zeynab Begum continued to be a close confidant and acted, according to the Italian traveller Pietro Della Valle, as his foster mother. Even after these years, for as much as the first two decades of his reign, Zeynab Begum functioned as one of Abbas's "key counselors". She continued to be the leading matriarch in the harem, and she oversaw the upbringing of Abbas's sons. It appears that local governors and military chiefs asked her for political intervention on their behalf with Abbas I.

During Abbas's reign, Zeynab Begum was intimately bound to the various administrative affairs of the crown (khasseh) sector within the Safavid bureaucracy. Between 1592–1593 and 1613–1614, she functioned as the governor of the crown sector of Kashan, and had two bureaucrats who acted as her deputies. During these years, she reportedly owned several villages in the southern outskirts of the city of Yazd. This allowed her, for most of Abbas's reign, to collect the poll tax imposed on the domain's Zoroastrian community, and to keep it for herself. Thanks to these monies, she was able to build at least one caravanserai along the Isfahan-Kashan route in 1601–1602. A year later, she was given the post of the keeper of the seal used for all the royal decrees issued by the empire (mohrdār-e sharaf nafadh).

In 1605, during the Ottoman–Safavid War of 1603–1618, she advised Abbas to attack the Ottomans at Sufian; this would result in one of his greatest military victories. She was on occasion included in the highest advisory body, the "Council of State"; in 1606, she was the only woman at the briefing. According to the Portuguese diplomat Antonio de Gouvea, "She made it very apparent that she deserved the honour". Several years later, in 1611–1612, she stood at the head of the royal banquet given on the occasion of the arrival of Wali-Mohammad Khan, the Uzbek ruler of Urgench, who had fled to the Safavid realm following an outbreak of civil war in Khwarezm.

== Downfall and pardon ==
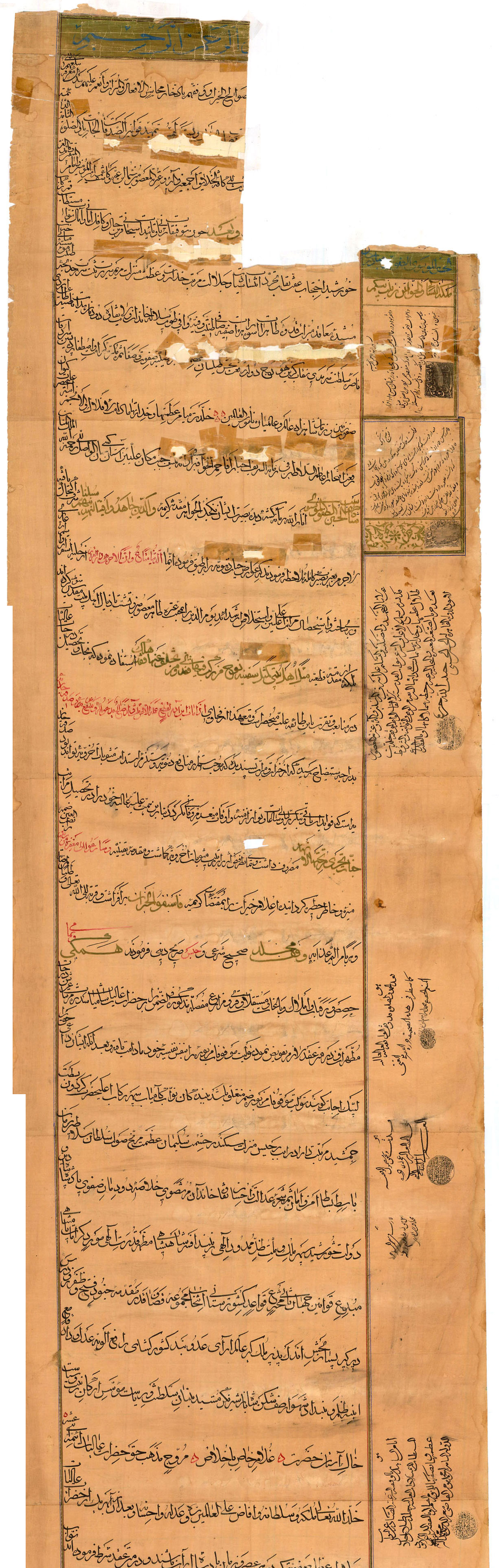
Zeynab's will, written in 1629

In 1613–1614, however, Zeynab Begum fell into disgrace. She was expelled from the harem, and all her posts were taken from her. She was subsequently banished to Qazvin, where she lived under house arrest. These events took place amidst several other purges of high-ranking Safavid officials and military leaders who were present at the court in Isfahan. According to historian Fazli Khuzani, this was the result of actions made by the leading mojtahed at the Safavid court, Mir Mohammad Baqer Damad.

Zeynab Begum was allowed to re-enter the royal court around four years later. In his accounts, Pietro Della Valle noted that he saw her in Isfahan in 1617 in the company of the royal harem. Zeynab Begum was restored as head of the royal harem in Farahabad and Isfahan by Abbas in the spring of 1627. During Abbas's terminal illness, Zeynab Begum reportedly was in close contact with the court physicians and was responsible for the supervision of his treatment at Farahabad. When Abbas died on the morning of 19 January 1629, she personally oversaw the transfer of his remains from Farahabad to Kashan, as well as the logistics of the transfer of the royal harem from Farahabad to Isfahan.

Though Zeynab Begum enjoyed numerous incidents of very grand prestige, authority and influence under Abbas, it was actually during the first few years of his successor, King Safi (r. 1629–1642), that she reached the apex of her influence and power. According to contemporaneous court chronicles, she played an important role in convincing Abbas on his deathbed to appoint his grandson Sam Mirza (later known by his regnal name of Safi) as his successor to the imperial throne. In the first few months of Safi's reign, Zeynab Begum stood on a daily basis at the head of the entire administrative organ of the country and had complete control over the management of the empire. Later in the same year, she joined Safi during the Ottoman-Safavid War of 1623–1639. On 28 May 1630, she led the royal harem to Golpayegan ahead of the Battle of Marivan.

On 12 February 1632, during the widespread bloody purges initiated by Safi, he ordered Zeynab Begum to move from Isfahan to Qazvin, banishing her from the court. This marked the end of Zeynab Begum's illustrious and privileged position. According to a contemporaneous report, she spent her last days in Isfahan. Yet having vast wealth, she led a peaceful life away from uncertain and dangerous political events in retirement until her death. She was succeeded as the leading matriarch in the royal harem by Dilaram Khanum, widow of Mohammad Baqer Mirza. Zeynab Begum died on 31 May 1640 in Qazvin and was buried in the Imam Reza shrine in Mashhad.

== Sources ==
- Babaie, Sussan; Babayan, Kathryn; Baghdiantz-McCabe, Ina; Farhad, Massumeh (2004). "The Safavid Household Reconfigured: Concubines, Eunuchs, and Military Slaves". Slaves of the Shah: New Elites of Safavid Iran. I.B.Tauris. ISBN 978-0857716866.
- Blow, David (2009). Shah Abbas: The Ruthless King Who became an Iranian Legend. London, UK: I. B.Tauris. ISBN 978-1845119898. LCCN 2009464064.
- Ghereghlou, Kioumars (2016). "ZAYNAB BEGUM". In Yarshater, Ehsan (ed.). Encyclopædia Iranica (Online ed.). Encyclopædia Iranica Foundation.
- Matthee, Rudi (2012). Persia in Crisis: Safavid Decline and the Fall of Isfahan. I.B.Tauris. ISBN 978-1845117450.
- Newman, Andrew J. (2008). Safavid Iran: Rebirth of a Persian Empire. I.B.Tauris. p. 66. ISBN 978-0857716613.
- Szuppe, Maria (2003). "Status, Knowledge, and Politics: Women in Sixteenth-Century Safavid Iran". In Nashat, Guity; Beck, Lois (eds.). Women in Iran from the Rise of Islam to 1800. University of Illinois Press. ISBN 978-0252071218.
