= Naqd Ali Beg =

Safavid diplomat (d. 1627)

- نقدعلی بیگ
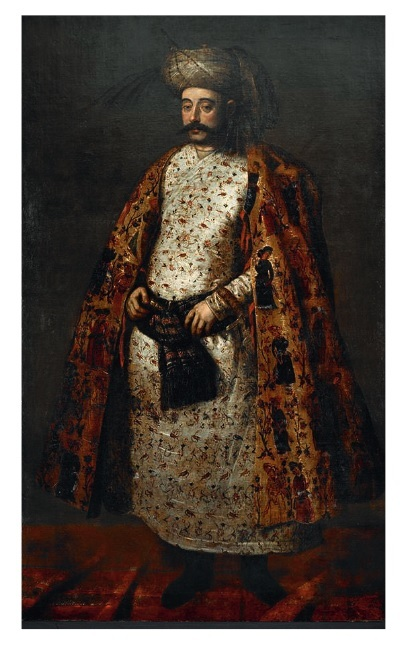
- Portrait of Naqd Ali Beg, made by Robert Greenbury in London, dated 1626

Safavid ambassador to England
- In office 1626–1627
- Monarch: Abbas the Great

Personal details
- Died: 29 November 1627
- Relatives: Zeynal Khan Shamlu (cousin)

Naqd Ali Beg (Persian: نقدعلی بیگ) was a diplomat in Safavid Iran, who was sent on a mission to England in 1626–1627. He was a cousin of Zeynal Khan Shamlu. After leaving England on 23 March 1627, Naqd Ali Beg died en route on 29 November 1627, allegedly due to opium overdose. The English traveler and historian Sir Thomas Herbert claimed that Naqd Ali Beg had committed suicide in fear of being punished by Abbas the Great for his "his abusive carriage in England" and other offences.

== Sources ==
- Blow, David (2009). Shah Abbas: The Ruthless King Who became an Iranian Legend. I.B. Tauris. ISBN 978-1845119898.
- Rota, Giorgio (2021). "Diplomatic relations between Safavid Iran and Europe". In Matthee, Rudi (ed.). The Safavid World. Routledge. pp. 588–609. ISBN 978-1138944060.
