= Muhammad Haravi =

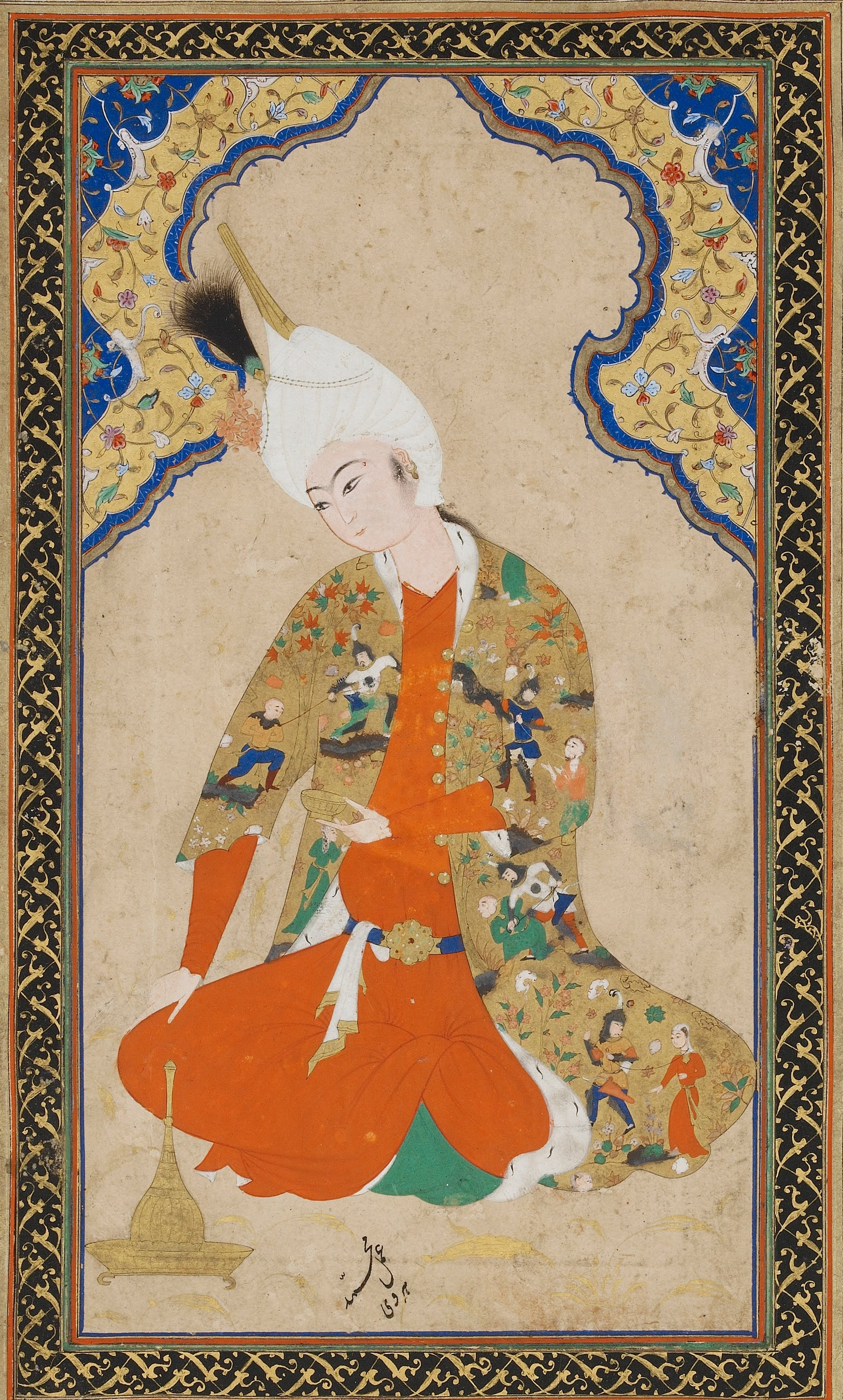
Young prince, painted and signed by Muhammad Haravi, mid-16th century.

Muhammad Haravi ("Muhammad of Herat", active 1560-1590), also called Muhammadi, was a Safavid painter of the mid-16th century, officiating particularly at the court of Shah Tahmasp and his successors.

From the mid-16th century, Muhammadi took the forefront of painting creation in Persia, together with other famous figures such as Mirza Ali and Shaykh Muhammad. These artists, led by Muhammadi, excelled in harmonizing Persian painting with Persian poetry. Their style would be later adopted and popularized by Riza Abbasi.

His productivity seems to have peaked in the service of Hamza Mirza. Towards the end of his career, he experimented with monotone tinted paintings, in green or yellow.

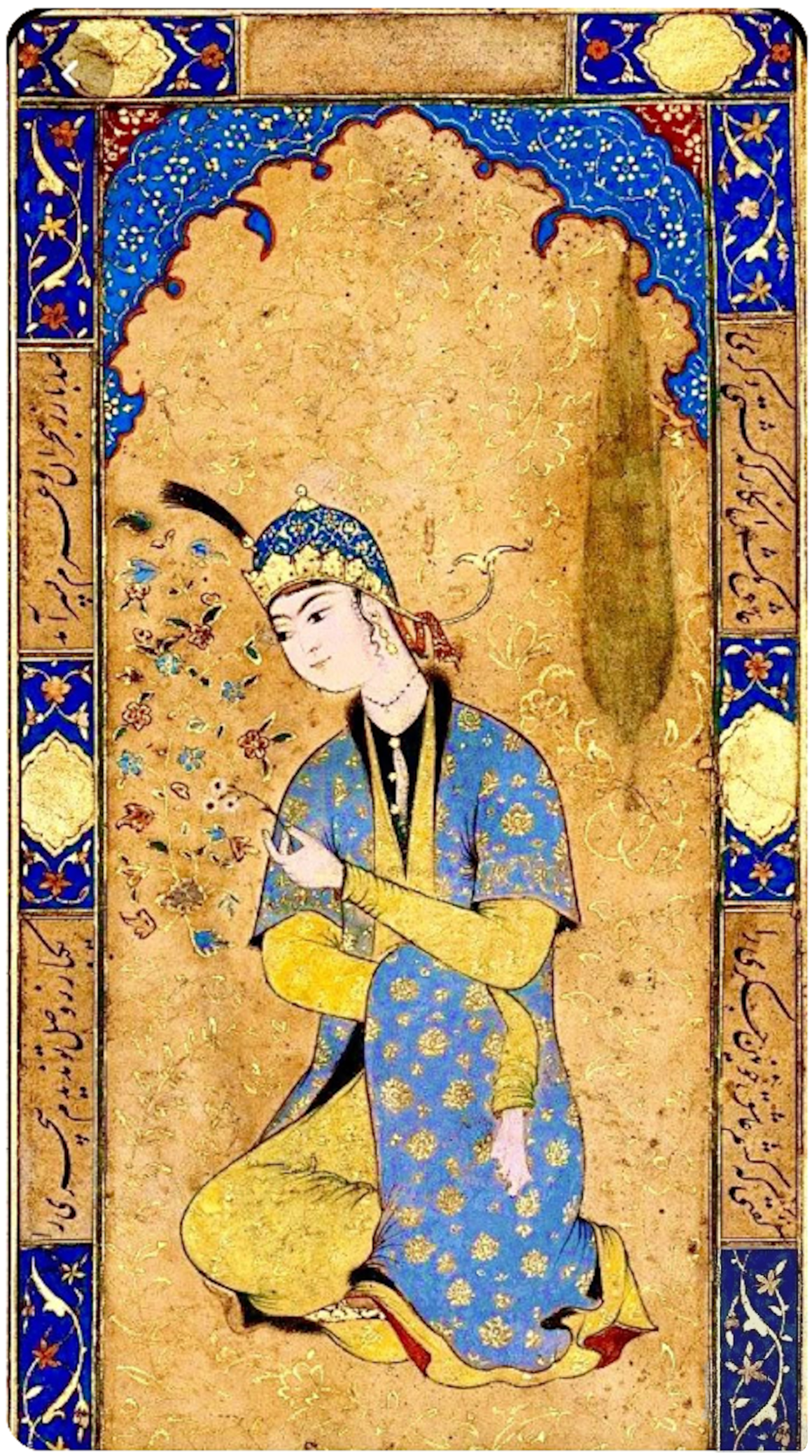
Painting of a seated princess, most likely Pari Khan Khanum, 1574-77.

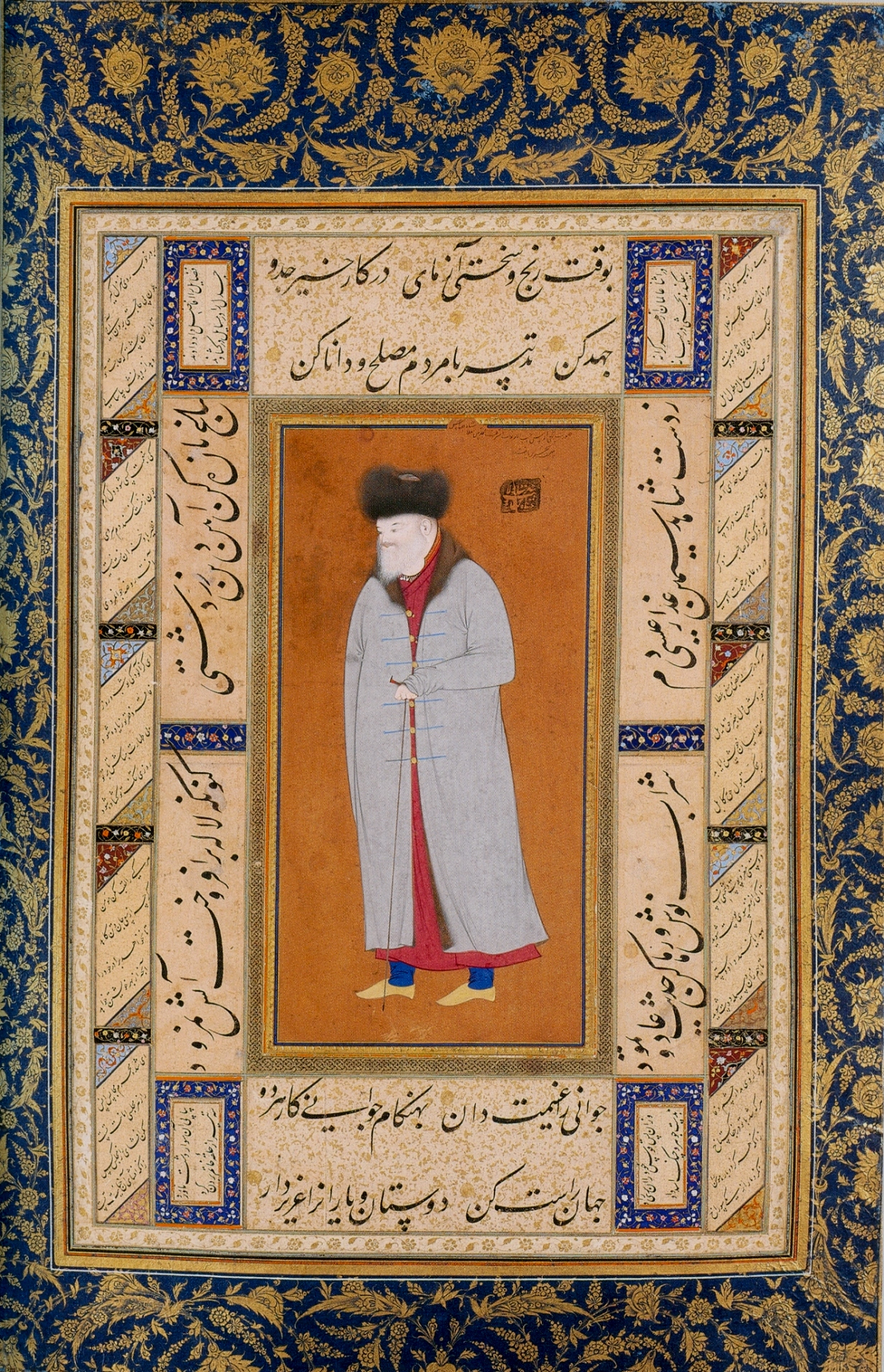
Muhammadi. Portrait of Russian Ambassador. (G.B. Vasilchikov) Herat, 1580s

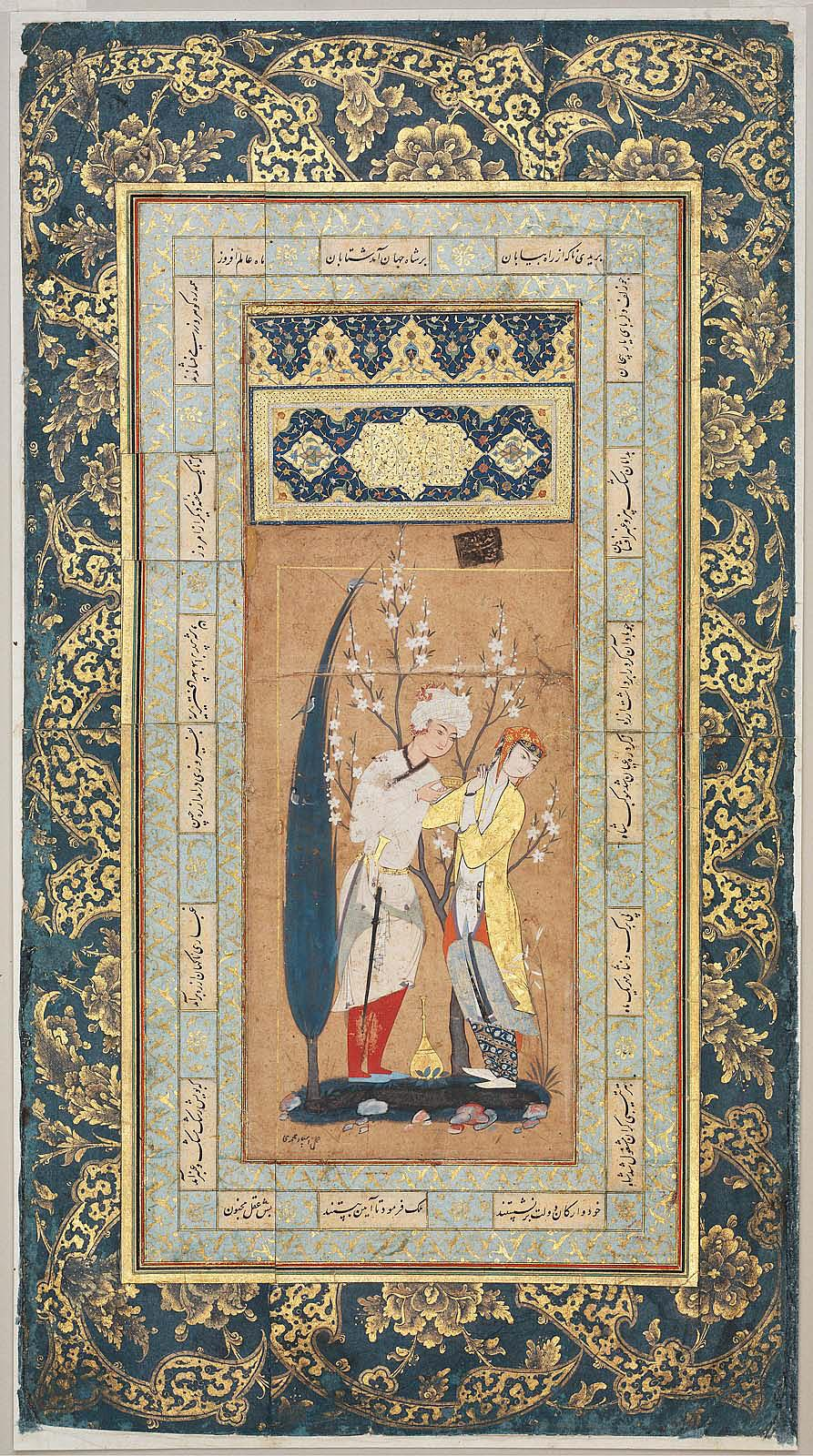
Lovers in a landscape

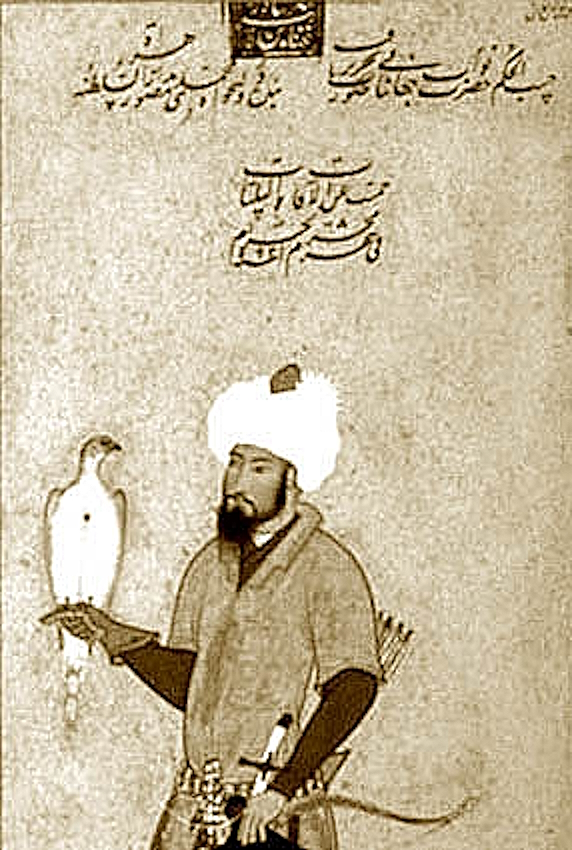
Monotone portrait of Ali-Qoli Khan Shamlu, 1584

== Sources ==
- Soudavar, Abolala (2000). "The Age of Muhammadi". Muqarnas. 17. Leiden: Brill: 53–72. doi:10.2307/1523290. ISBN 9004116699. ISSN 2211-8993. JSTOR 1523290. OCLC 59515859.
