= Safavid imperial harem =

Collection of wives, female relatives, and concubines of Safavid shahs

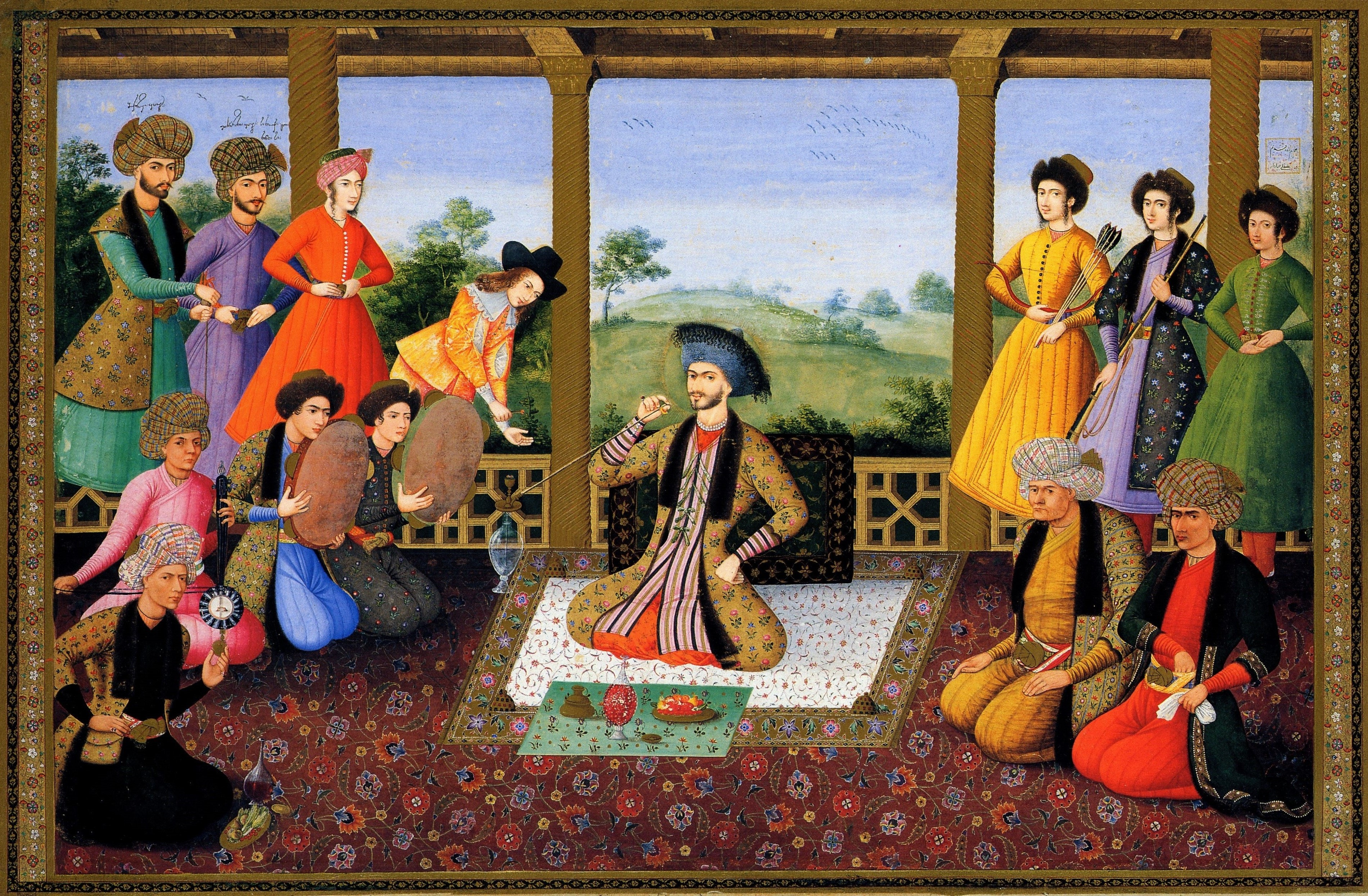
Suleiman I and his courtiers (1670)

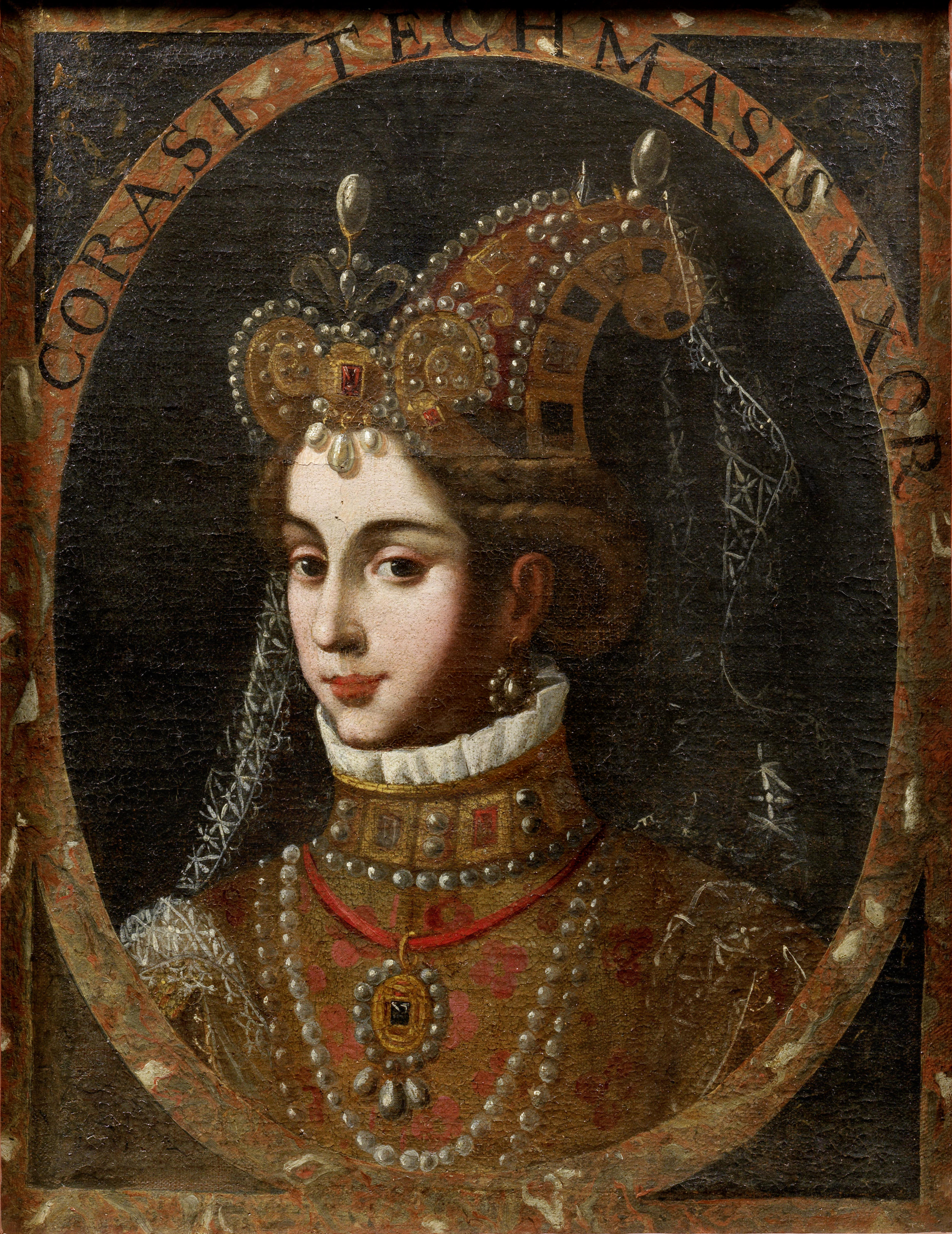
Portrait of Corasi, Sultan Agha Khanum, second wife of Tahmasp I

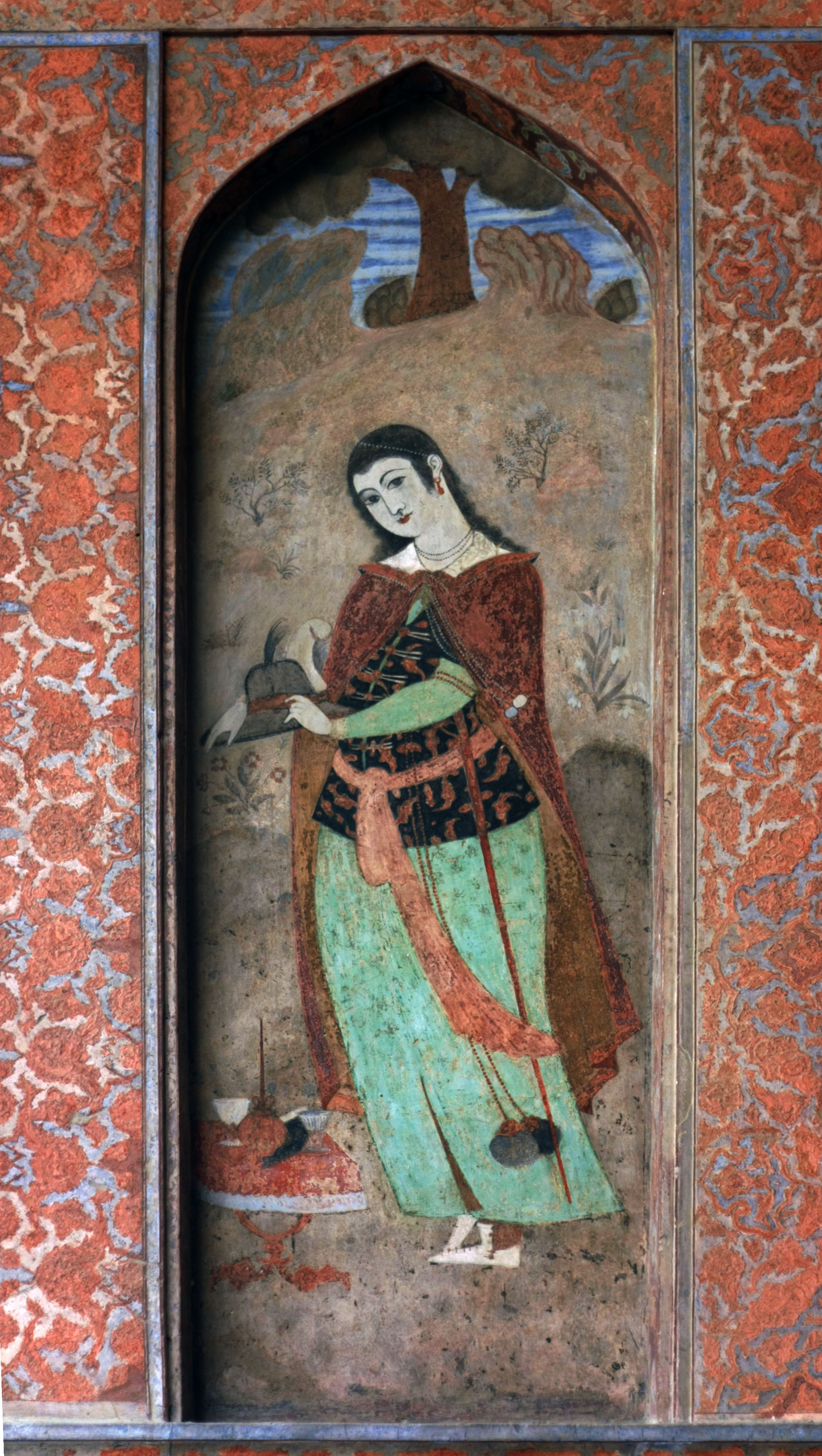
Fresco from the portico of the Ali Qapu Palace, depicting a Persian woman

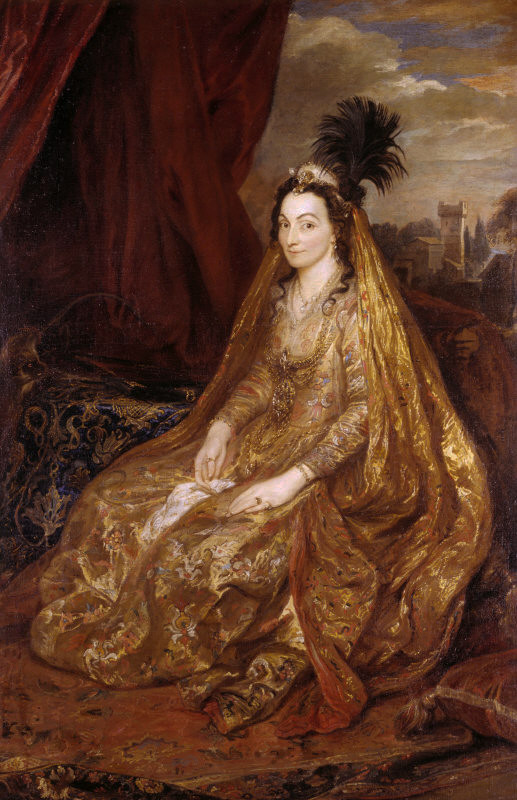
Lady Shirley by Anthony van Dyck, c. 1622

The Safavid imperial harem refers to the harem of the monarchs of the Safavid dynasty of Iran. The harem of the Safavid shahs played an important role in the history of Safavid Iran (1501–1736).

It was the quarters of the women of the Imperial household, where the female members of the dynasty lived in sex segregation. It was the home to the mother, wives, slave concubines and unmarried female members of the dynasty. It was an institution of importance and often the place of political influence.

== Hierarchy and organisation ==
The Safavid harem consisted of mothers, wives, slave concubines and female relatives, and was staffed with female slaves and with eunuchs who acted as their guards and channel to the rest of the world. Shah Soltan Hoseyn's (r. 1694–1722) court has been estimated to include five thousand slaves; male and female, black and white, of whom one hundred were black eunuchs.

=== Consorts ===
The monarchs of the Safavid dynasty preferred to procreate through slave concubines, which would neutralize potential ambitions from relatives and other inlaws and protect patrimony. The slave concubines (and later mothers) of the Shah's mainly consisted of enslaved Circassian, Georgian and Armenian women, captured as war booty, bought at the slave market (see Crimean slave trade), or received as gifts from local potentates.

The slave concubines were sometimes forced to convert to Shia Islam upon entering the harem, and referred to as kaniz.

In contrast to the common custom in Islamic courts to allow only non-Muslim women to become harem concubines, the Safavid harem also contained Muslim concubines, as some free Iranian Muslim daughters were gifted by their families or taken by the royal household to the harem as concubines.

These women were educated in accomplishments and then either became consorts, or served as the maids of the consorts. One of the women educated in the Imperial harem was the famous Teresa Sampsonia.

The enslaved harem women could achieve great influence, but there are also examples of the opposite: Shah Abbas II (r. 1642–1666) burned three of his slave-wives (concubines) alive because they refused to drink with him, as well as another wife for lying about her menstruation period, and Shah Safi (r. 1629–1642) stabbed his wife to death for disobedience.

=== Princes ===
In the early Safavid era, young princes were placed in the care of a lala (high-ranking Qizilbash chief who acted as a guardian) and eventually given charge of important governorates. Although this system had the danger of encouraging regional rebellions against the shah, it gave the princes education and training which prepared them for dynastic succession.

This policy was changed by Shah Abbas I (1571–1629), who "largely banished" the princes to the harem, where their social interactions were limited to the ladies of the harem and eunuchs. This deprived them of administrative and military training as well as experience of dealing with the aristocracy of the realm, which, together with the princes' indulgent upbringing, made them not only unprepared to carry out royal responsibilities, but often also uninterested in doing so.

The confinement of royal princes to the harem was an important factor contributing to the decline of the Safavid dynasty.

=== Staff ===
The administration of the royal harem constituted an independent branch of the court, staffed mainly by eunuchs. These were initially black eunuchs, but white eunuchs from Georgia also began to be employed from the time of Abbas I.

Slave eunuchs performed various tasks in many levels of the harem as well as the general court. Eunuchs had offices in the general court, such as in the royal treasury and as the tutors and adoptive fathers of non-castrated slaves selected to be slave soldiers (ghilman), as well as inside the harem, and served as a channel between the secluded harem women and the outside court and world, which gave them a potentially powerful role at court.

== The harem as a social and political institution ==
The mothers of rival princes together with eunuchs engaged in palace intrigues in an attempt to place their candidate on the throne. From the middle of the sixteenth century, rivalries between Georgian and Circassian women in the royal harem gave rise to dynastic struggles of an ethnic nature previously unknown at the court. When Shah Abbas II died in 1666, palace eunuchs engineered the succession of Suleiman I and effectively seized control of the state.

Suleiman set up a privy council, which included the most important eunuchs, in the harem, thereby depriving traditional state institutions of their functions. The eunuchs' influence over military and civil affairs was checked only by their internal rivalries and the religious movement led by Mohammad-Baqer Majlesi. The royal harem reached such proportions under Soltan Hoseyn (1668–1726) that it consumed a large part of state revenues.

After the fall of the Safavid dynasty, which occurred soon afterwards, eunuchs were never again able to achieve significant political influence as a class in Iran.

== Bloody Ma'bas ==
In 1632, a massacre took place in the Royal Safavid harem in Isfahan. The massacre took place on the order of Safi I the night of 20 February 1632, and became known under the name Bloody Ma'bas.

Shah Abbas I had his sons killed and his grandsons imprisoned in order to avoid the threat of political conspiracies. Upon Abbas I's in 1629, however, open rivalry and warfare broke out between his male grandchildren and cousins. In 1632, forty women were killed in the Safavid harem alongside all male royal grandchildren on both the male and female lines in order to avoid all claims to the throne from both the male as well as the female lines of the dynasty.

Safi I also removed all the royal slaves of Abbas I, Qizilbash (shaykhavand), as well as all the officials (Marashi) and son-in-laws (damad) from their posts.

The 1632 Safavid harem massacre reorganized the system of the Safavid dynasty; all alternative family lines were eliminated, and the succession was thereafter concentrated on a single male main line.

== See also ==
- Abbasid harem
- Qajar harem
- Ottoman Imperial Harem

== Sources ==
- Babaie, Sussan; Babayan, Kathryn; Baghdiantz-McCabe, Ina; Farhad, Massumeh (2004). Slaves of the Shah: New Elites of Safavid Iran. I.B. Tauris. ISBN 978-1860647215.
- Bearman, P.; Bianquis, Th.; Bosworth, C. E.; van Donzel, E.; Heinrichs, W. P., eds. (1978). Encyclopaedia of Islam (2nd ed.). Brill.
- Fisher, William Bayne; Jackson, Peter; Lockhart, Lawrence, eds. (1986). The Cambridge History of Iran. Vol. 6. Cambridge University Press.
- Roemer, H. R. "The Safavid Period". In Fisher, Jackson & Lockhart (1986).
- Savory, R. M. (1977). "Safavid Persia". In P. M. Holt; Ann K. S. Lambton; Bernard Lewis (eds.). The Cambridge History of Islam. The Central Islamic Lands from Pre-Islamic Times to the First World War. Vol. 1A. Cambridge University Press.
- Savory, R. M. "The Safavid Administrative System". In Fisher, Jackson & Lockhart (1986).
