= Greenberry =

Greenberry or Green Berry may refer to:

== Community organisation ==
- Greenberry, Oregon, an unincorporated community in Benton County, Oregon, United States

== Corporate organisation ==
- Greenberry (2018-present), an incorporated IT management, software, and cyber security solution corporation based in Meath, Ireland.
- Greenberry Kids (2020-present), an incorporated child clothing retailer based in South Korean.
- Greenberry Foils (2018-present), an incorporated aluminum foil manufacturer based in India.

== People ==
- Nicholas Greenberry (1640-1697), Royal Governor of the U.S. state Maryland
- Green Berry Raum (1829–1909), American politician from Illinois
- Greenberry G. Rupert (1847–1922), American Adventist pastor
- William Greeneberry Russell (1818–1877), American prospector
- Green Berry Samuels (1806–1859), American politician from Virginia
- Green Berry Smith (1820–1886), American politician, member of the 1849 Oregon Territorial Legislature

== Plant ==
- Solanum opacum, a species of flowering plant in the family Solanaceae, commonly called green berry nightshade.
