= Ali-Qoli Khan Shamlu =

Turkoman Safavid officer (died 1589)

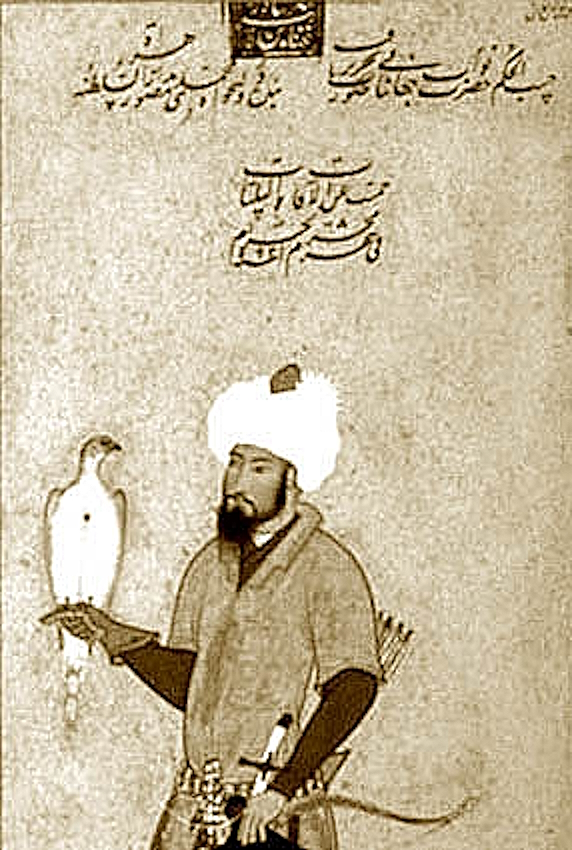
- Portrait of Ali-Qoli Khan Shamlu (aka Haji Ali Qizilbash Mazandarani) Governor of Khorassan in 1576 and chief of the armies under Shah Abbas I in 1588. Painted in earthy monotone by Muhammadi in 1584. Topkapi Palace Library, H.2166.

Governor of Herat
- In office 1577–1589
- Monarchs: Ismail II (r. 1576–1777); Mohammad Khodabanda (r. 1578–1587); Abbas I (r. 1587–1629)
- Succeeded by: Uzbek occupation→Farhad Khan Qaramanlu

Personal details
- Died: 1589
- Parent: Hoseyn Khan Shamlu (father)
- Clan: Shamlu

Military service
- Allegiance: Safavid Iran
- Battles/wars: Persian–Uzbek wars

Ali-Qoli Khan Shamlu (Persian: علی قلی خان شاملو; died 1589) was a Shamlu Turkoman officer of the Safavid Empire. He is mostly remembered for leading a rebellious coalition against then-incumbent kings (shahs) Ismail II and Mohammad Khodabanda. This rebellion guaranteed the survival of the young prince Abbas (later Abbas I or Abbas the Great; r. 1588–1629), for whom he was guardian (laleh).

== Biography ==
=== Early years ===
Ali-Qoli Khan was the son of Soltan Hossein Khan, and grandson of Durmish Khan. In October 1577 Ali-Qoli Khan left the royal capital of Qazvin for Herat, being appointed as its new governor by King Ismail II (r. 1576–1577). However, he was sent to Herat not merely to assume his new position, but also to present orders for the execution of the young prince Abbas, who was only six years old at the time. Abbas had been left alone at Herat after Shah-Qoli Ustajlu (his first guardian) was killed on the orders of Ismail II.

Ismail II promised Ali-Qoli Khan a reward for accepting the governorship: he was allowed to marry Tahmasp I's daughter, Zeynab Begum, thus tying him directly to the Safavid royal house. The marriage took place sometime before 7 December 1577 but apparently was never consummated, for Zeynab Begum continued to live in the royal harem in the Safavid capital of Qazvin.

Finding himself now in Herat, Ali-Qoli Khan delayed Abbas' execution, giving as a reason that it would be "inappropriate" to execute an "innocent" descendant of a seyed on the day of Shab-e-Qadr. Thereafter, it was delayed until after Eid-e Fetr (which in 1577 fell on 12 December). This postponement was the reason that the young Abbas managed to live on; Ismail II had died on 24 November, and the courier who was bringing the news reportedly only arrived in the city on 13 December.

=== Defying orders ===
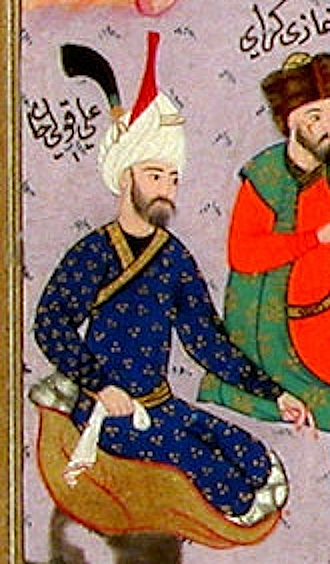
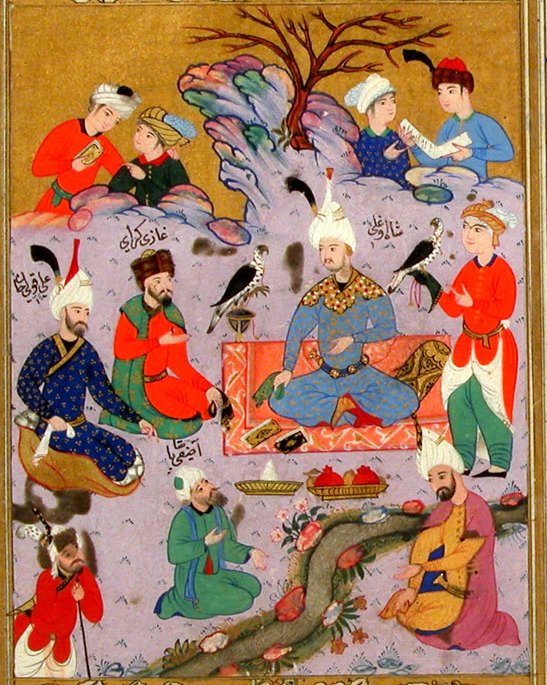
ʿAlī Qulī Khān (علی قلی خان) before Ḥamza Mirzā, together with the captives Crimean Tatar prince Ğazı II Giray and Ottoman author Asafi Pasha, circa 1584-85. Şecāʿatnāme (1586).

In the ensuing period, Ali-Qoli Khan took the role of guardian (laleh) over prince Abbas. The new Safavid king, Mohammad Khodabanda (r. 1578–1587), repeatedly sent orders for Abbas to be brought to the capital in Qazvin, but every single time, Ali-Qoli Khan ignored the king. Ali-Qoli Khan affirmed that sending Abbas away would drastically endanger the "interests" of the state, as it would "encourage" the Uzbeks to carry out attacks on Khorasan province.

Eventually, Mohammad Khodabanda and his queen, Khayr ol-Nesa Begum, decided to step up the pressure on Ali-Qoli Khan Shamlu. They sent Soltan Hossein Khan Shamlu, Ali-Qoli Khan's own father, to Herat and gave him an ultimatum of three months to return to Qazvin with the young prince Abbas. Mohammad Khodabanda proclaimed that if Ali-Qoli Khan and his circle of acquaintances continued to ignore the king's orders, they would be declared rebels by the central government.

=== Increasing friction ===
After Khayr ol-Nesa's murder, the Khosaran province increasingly became an area of friction between Ali-Qoli Khan Shamlu and his Shamlu–Ustajlu coalition on one hand, and the coalition of Morteza-Qoli Khan Pornak Torkman on the other. Both factions continued to jockey for influence at the court; Ali-Qoli Khan's parents were executed by members of Morteza-Qoli Khan's faction.

Having grown severely dissatisfied with Ali-Qoli Khan's disobedience, Mohammad Khodabanda sent a force to Herat in 1581 to deal with Ali-Qoli Khan. However, it ended in failure, for they were unable to reach any kind of success (either by dialogue or military confrontation) with Ali-Qoli Khan's faction. Thereafter, Ali-Qoli Khan's coalition, in Khorasan, decided to proclaim the young Abbas as king (shah). They started minting coins in prince Abbas' name and had the khotbeh (a prayer in the name of a reigning sovereign) read in his name. In 1582 Mohammad Khodabanda himself led an expedition, composed of some 80,000 men, to deal with Ali-Qoli Khan and his men. However, this expedition turned out to be unsuccessful as well; after about a year of cursory skirmishes and negotiations, Mohammad Khodabanda was only able to reach a "truce" with the rebellious coalition that resulted in status quo ante bellum.

The coalition headed by Ali-Qoli Khan stated that they would reassert their loyalty to Mohammad Khodabanda, and agreed to consider Hamzeh Mirza, prince Abbas's brother, as the crown prince. Safavid king Mohammad Khodabanda, in return, confirmed Ali-Qoli Khan as governor of Herat as well as guardian of prince Abbas, and agreed to have Mohammad-Qoli Khan Pornak (Ali-Qoli Khan's archrival), dismissed.

=== Later life and death ===
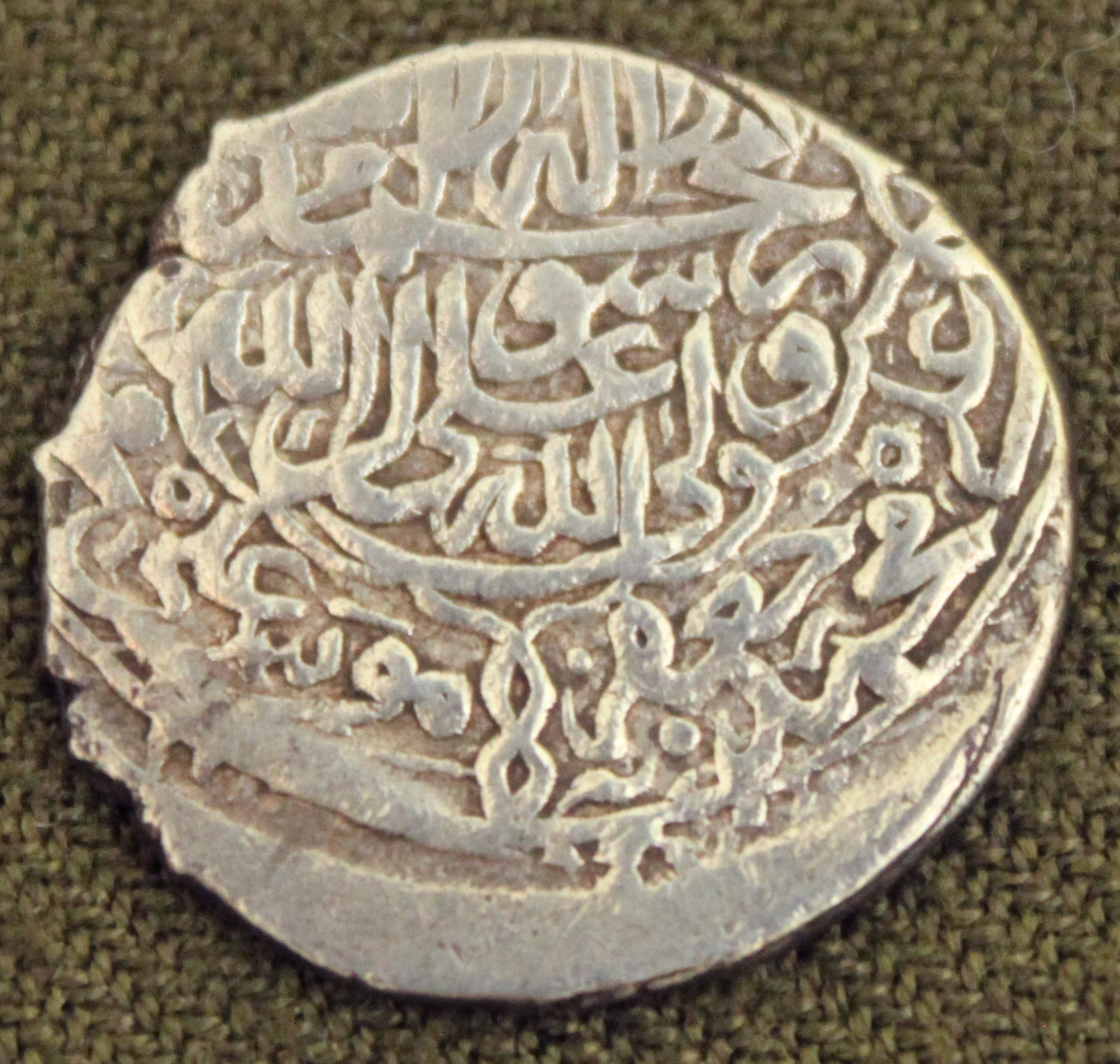
Coin minted during the reign of Mohammad Khodabanda

After Mohammad Khodabanda accepted his dethronement, a major issue between Ali-Qoli Khan and Morshed-Qoli Khan (the leader of the Ustajlus) developed over prince Abbas. In 1585 Morshed-Qoli Khan captured Mashhad. Ali-Qoli Khan Ustajlu responded by sending an army; when the two armies met, Morshed Qoli Khan managed to abduct prince Abbas from the battlefield, and took him to Mashhad. Ali-Qoli Khan, after his failure to make Morshed-Qoli Khan release Abbas, decided to retire to Herat, much to his chagrin and with a sense of remorse.

Ali-Qoli Khan met his fate in December 1587, when the Uzbeks under Abdullah Khan II besieged Herat. Though he reportedly managed to hold off the invading force for more than a year, demonstrating exceptional courage and effort, Ali-Qoli Khan was eventually forced to surrender the city in February 1589 to the Uzbeks. He was then deceitfully executed by the Uzbek leader. The fall of Herat was staged on purpose by Morshed-Qoli Khan Ustajlu, Ali-Qoli Khan's longtime ally (and later rival); finding himself now in a superior position after putting Abbas on the throne, he deliberately delayed the arrival of the relief force meant for Herat.

== Sources ==
- Babaie, Sussan (2004). Slaves of the Shah: New Elites of Safavid Iran. I.B.Tauris. ISBN 978-1860647215.
- Floor, Willem M. (2008). Titles and Emoluments in Safavid Iran: A Third Manual of Safavid Administration, by Mirza Naqi Nasiri. Washington, DC: Mage Publishers. p. 202. ISBN 978-1933823232.
- Ghereghlou, Kioumars (2016). "ZAYNAB BEGUM". Encyclopaedia Iranica.
- Kia, Mehrdad (2017). The Ottoman Empire: A Historical Encyclopedia. ABC-CLIO. ISBN 978-1610693899.
- Necipogulu, Gulru; Roxburgh, David J. (July 2000). Muqarnas: An Annual on the Visual Culture of the Islamic World. BRILL. p. 64, fig.20. ISBN 978-90-04-11669-6.
- Savory, R.N. (1985). "ʿALĪ-QOLĪ KHAN ŠĀMLŪ". Encyclopaedia Iranica, Vol. I, Fasc. 8. pp. 875–876.
- Munshi, Eskandar Beg (1629). History of Shah 'Abbas the Great (Tārīkh-e 'Ālamārā-ye 'Abbāsī) / Roger M. Savory, translator. p. 343.
- Taner, Melis (2020). "Illustrated Manuscripts Attributed to Baghdad". Caught in a whirlwind: a cultural history of Ottoman Baghdad as reflected in its illustrated manuscripts. Leiden; Boston: Brill. p. 233, note 549. ISBN 978-9004412699.

Preceded by Aras Soltan Rumlu	Governor of Herat; 1577–1589	Succeeded by Uzbek rule
