= Massumeh Farhad =

American curator, art historian (born c.1955)

- Born: Iran
- Education: Harvard University
- Occupations: Curator, art historian, author
- Known for: Islamic art history, Iranian art history, Turkish art history

Massumeh Farhad is an Iranian-born American curator, art historian, and author. She is the Chief Curator and Curator of Islamic Art at the Freer Gallery of Art and Arthur M. Sackler Gallery at the Smithsonian Institution National Museum of Asian Art. She is known for her work with Persian 17th-century manuscripts.

== Biography ==
Massumeh Farhad grew up in Iran, and emigrated from Iran to the United States to attend university. Farhad has a PhD (1987) in art history from Harvard University. In 1997, she had been in a relationship with the Chief Curator of the National Museum of African Art, Philip L. Ravenhill (1945–1997) before his death.

She has contributed to the Encyclopædia Iranica. Farhad has curated numerous exhibitions including the "Art of the Persian Courts" (1996), "The Heroic Past: The Persian Book of Kings" (2000), "Fountains of Light: The Nuhad Es-Said Collection of Metalwork" (2000), "Antoin Sevruguin and the Persian Image" (2001), "The Adventures of Hamza" (2002), "Style and Status: Imperial Costumes From Ottoman Turkey" (2005), "Facing East: Portraits from Asia" (2006), "Falnama: The Book of Omens" (2009), and "The Art of Qur’an: Treasures from the Museum of Turkish and Islamic Art" (2016–2017).

== Publications ==
- Farhad, Massumeh (1987). Safavid Single Page Painting, 1629–1666 (thesis). Harvard University. OCLC 192140330.
- Farhad, Massumeh (1990). The Art of Mu'in Musavvir: A Mirror of His Times.
- Simpson, Marianna Shreve; Farhad, Massumeh (1997). Sultan Ibrahim Mirza's Haft Awrang: A Princely Manuscript from Sixteenth-century Iran. Yale University Press. ISBN 9780300068023.
- Babaie, Sussan; Babayan, Kathryn; McCabe, Ina Baghdiantz; Farhad, Massumeh (2003). Slaves of the Shah: New Elites of Safavid Iran. I.B. Tauris. ISBN 978-1860647215.
- Farhad, Massumeh; Bağcı, Serpil (2009). Falnama: The Book of Omens. Arthur M. Sackler Gallery, Smithsonian Institution. ISBN 9780934686150.
- Farhad, Massumeh; McAuliffe, Jane; Rettig, Simon; Déroche, François; Tanındı, Zeren (2016). Farhad, Massumeh; Rettig, Simon (eds.). The Art of the Qurʼan: Treasures from the Museum of Turkish and Islamic Arts. Türk ve İslâm Eserleri Müzesi (Museum of Turkish and Islamic Arts). Smithsonian Institution. ISBN 9781588345783.

== See also ==
- Women in the art history field
