= Eshik-aqasi-bashi =

Title in the administration of Safavid Iran

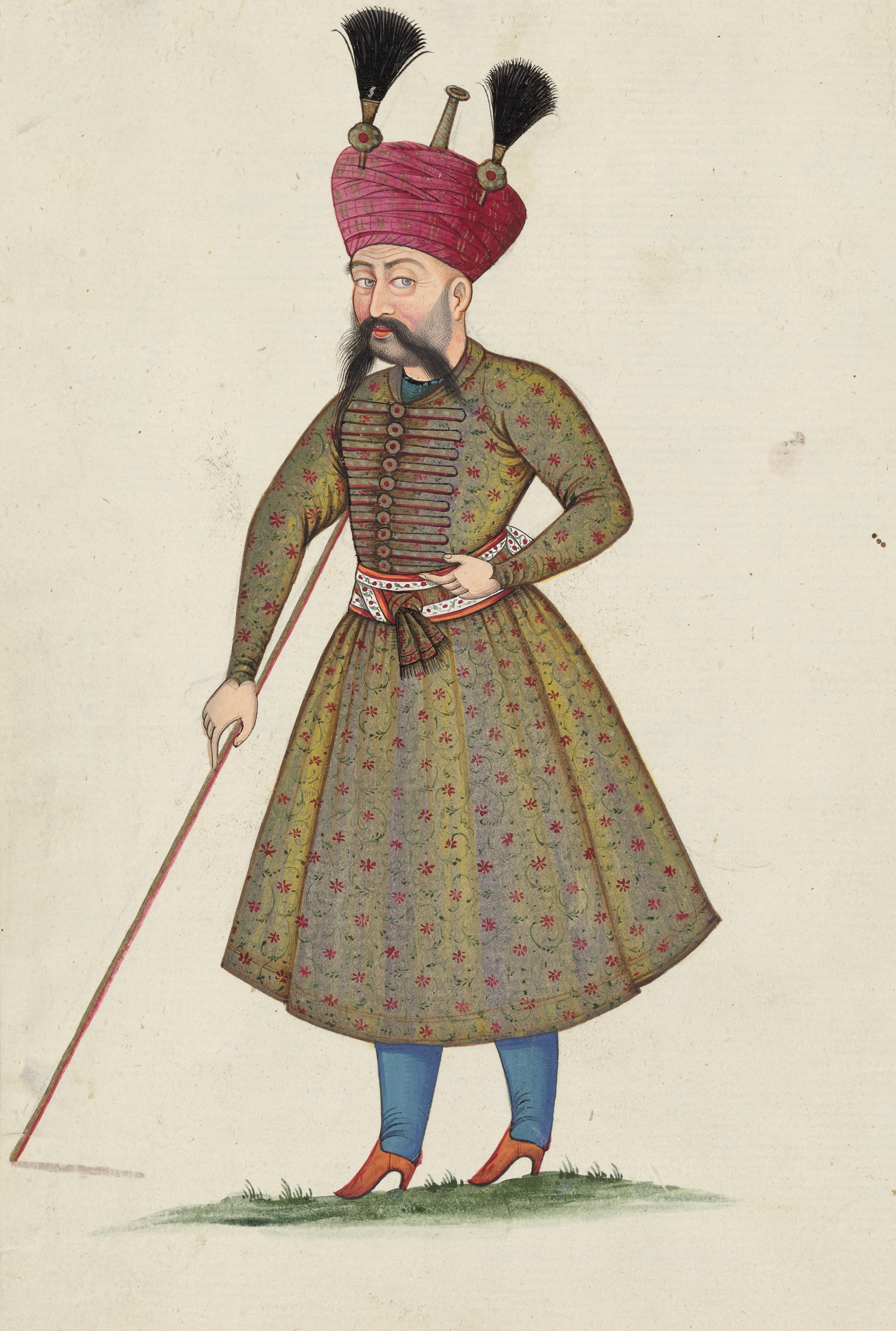
Portrait of the "Under Master of Ceremonies" - Free Library of Philadelphia

Eshik-aqasi-bashi or Ishik-aqasi-bashi (Persian: ایشیک آقاسی باشی) was an administrative title used in Iran during the Safavid and Qajar eras.

Under the Safavids, there were two eshik-aqasi-bashi offices, one of the divan (eshik-aqasi-bashi-e divan), and one of the Safavid imperial harem (eshik-aqasi-bashi-e haram).

One of the four pillars of the state was the eshik-aqasi-bashi-e divan. He held significant power in both political and economic matters and was part of the council of powerful amirs. The administrative powers of the eshik-aqasi-bashi-e haram was limited to the harem, and he was also of lower status and under the authority of the eshik-aqasi-bashi-e divan.

Under the Qajars, the authority of the eshik-aqasi-bashi was decreased.

== Sources ==
- Savory, Roger M. (1998). "Ešīk-āqāsī-bāšī". In Yarshater, Ehsan (ed.). Encyclopædia Iranica. Vol. VIII/6: Eršād al-zerāʿa–Eʿteżād-al-Salṭana. London and New York: Routledge & Kegan Paul. pp. 600–601. ISBN 978-1-56859-055-4.
