= Sussan Babaie =

Iranian-born American art historian

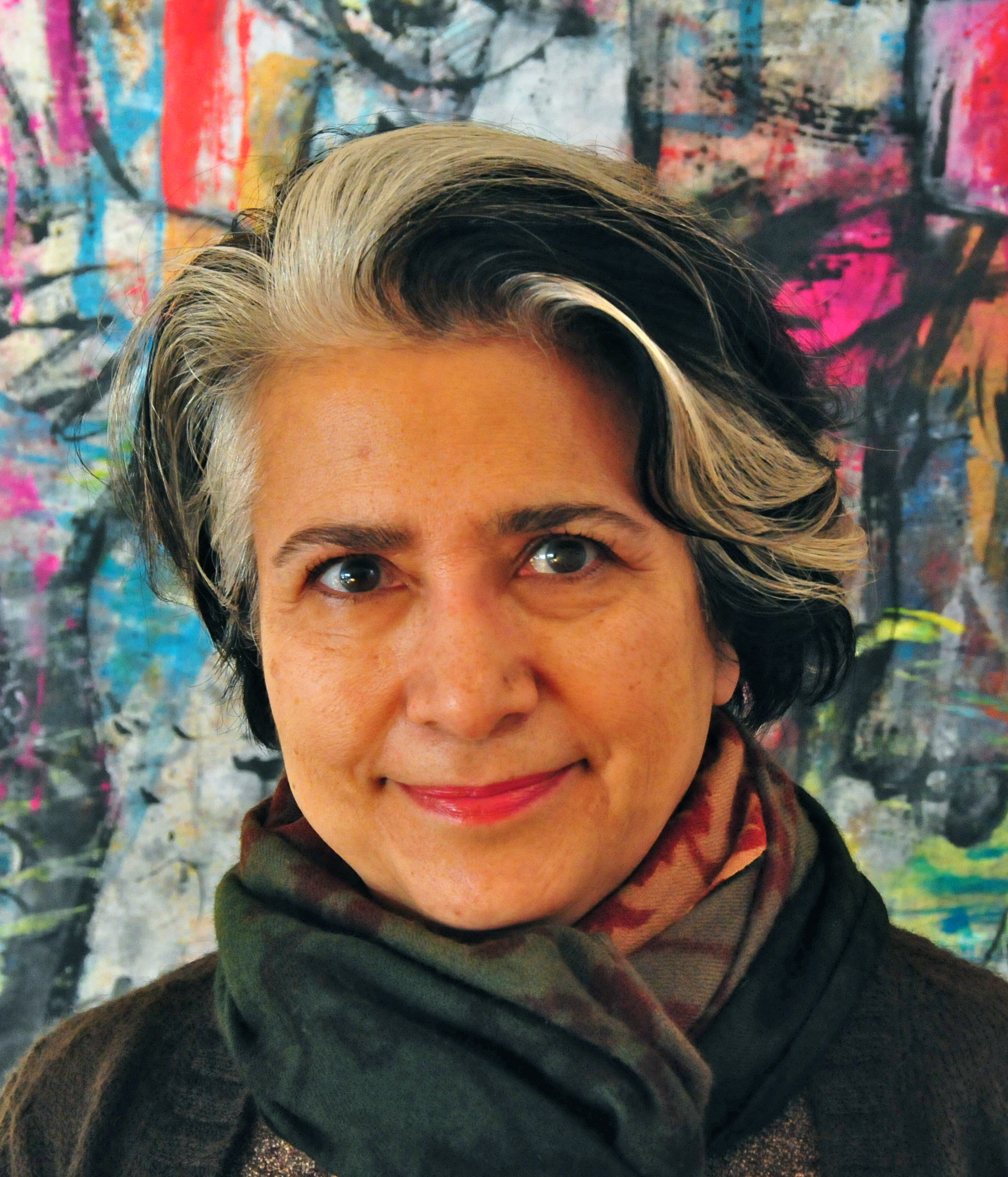
- Babaie in Edirne, Turkey (2012)
- Born: 1954 (age 71–72); Abadan, Iran
- Occupation: Art historian

Academic background
- Education: University of Tehran; The American University; New York University Institute of Fine Arts
- Thesis: Safavid Palaces at Isfahan; Continuity and Change (1590–1666) (1994)
- Doctoral advisor: Priscilla P. Soucek

Academic work
- Institutions: The Courtauld Institute of Art (2013–present)
- Main interests: Safavid dynasty, Islamic architecture Islamic art, Urbanism, Empire

Sussan Babaie (Persian: سوسن بابایی, born 1954) is an Iranian-born art historian and curator. She is best known for her work on Persian art and Islamic art of the early modern period. She has written extensively on the art and architecture of the Safavid dynasty. Her research takes a multidisciplinary approach and explores topics such as urbanism, empire studies, transcultural visuality and notions of exoticism. In her work as a curator, Babaie has worked on exhibitions at the Sackler Museum of Harvard University (2010), the University of Michigan Museum of Art (installation, 2002–2006), and the Smith College Museum of Art (1998).

She lived in the United States from 1979 until 2013. Since 2013, Babaie has been the Dr Andrew W. Mellon Reader in the Arts of Iran and Islam at The Courtauld Institute of Art in London.

== Biography ==
Babaie was born in Abadan, Iran, in 1954. She studied graphic design at the Faculty of Fine Arts at the University of Tehran with Iranian graphic designer Morteza Momayyez until the Iranian Revolution of 1979, when she moved to the United States. In the US, Babaie continued her studies at the American University in Washington DC, where she gained an MA in Italian Renaissance and American Arts after switching her focus to art history. In 1994 she completed her PhD at New York University Institute of Fine Arts under Priscilla P. Soucek. Her dissertation focused on the arts and architecture of Iran, and was titled "Safavid Palaces at Isfahan; Continuity and Change (1590–1666)".

Since the 1990s, Babaie has taught art history in Europe and the US. She was an assistant professor in the Department of the History of Art at the University of Michigan between 2001 and 2008 and a visiting professor at the Institut für Kunstgeschichte at LMU Munich between 2010 and 2012. In 2013, she took up a newly established research post in Asian art history at the Courtauld Institute of Art, which is designed to focus on the period 1000-1750 AD and questions of imperialism and artistic patronage from the perspective of non-Western empires. It marked a change in approach for the Courtauld Institute of Art, where since the Second World War the curriculum has focused primarily on the Western tradition.

Sussan Babaie is on the editorial board of the journal Muqarnas and the president of the Historians of Islamic Art Association (2017–19). Babaie is also a member of the Governing Council of the British Academy's British Institute of Persian Studies, as well as a member of the Editorial and Advisory Boards of the Oxford University's Journal of Islamic Material Culture, as well as the Journal of Iranian Studies.

== Research ==
Babaie's research has been supported by the National Endowment for the Humanities, the Fulbright Program and the Getty Research Institute in Los Angeles. Babaie's Isfahan and its Palaces: Statecraft, Shi'ism and the Architecture of Conviviality in Early Modern Iran (2008) was the Winner of the Houshang Pourshariati Iranian Studies Book Award in 2009.

== Books ==
- Persian Drawings in the Metropolitan Museum of Art with Marie Lukens Swietochowski (New York: Metropolitan Museum of Art, 1989) ISBN 0-87099-564-2
- Slaves of the Shah: New Elites of Safavid Iran co-edited and co-authored with Kathryn Babayan, Ina Baghdiantz and Massumeh Farhad) (London: I.B. Tauris, 2004) ISBN 978-1-86-064721-5
- Isfahan and its Palaces: Statecraft, Shi'ism and the Architecture of Conviviality in Early Modern Iran (Edinburgh: University of Edinburgh Press: 2008) ISBN 978-0-74-863375-3
- Shirin Neshat co-authored with Rebecca Hart and Nancy Princenthal) (Detroit Institute of Arts, 2013) ISBN 978-0-89-558166-2
- Persian Kingship and Architecture: Strategies of Power in Iran from the Achaemenids to the Pahlavis co-edited with Talinn Grigor (I.B. Tauris, 2015) ISBN 978-1-84-885751-3
- The Mercantile Effect: On Art and Exchange in the Islamicate World during the 17th and 18th Centuries co-editor with Melanie Gibson (Chicago; University of Chicago Press, 2017)
- The Idea of Iran: post-Mongol polities and the Reinvention of Iranian Identities editor (London: I.B. Tauris, 2018–19)
- The Idea of Iran: Crisis and Renewal in the Age of Mongol Prestige editor (London: I.B. Tauris, 2018–19)
- (editor) Iran After the Mongols (London: I.B. Tauris, 2019) ISBN 9781788315289

== Exhibitions ==
- Persian Drawings in the Metropolitan Museum of Art co-curated with Marie Lukens Swietochowski. Metropolitan Museum of Art (1989)
- Islamic Art from the Permanent Collection Smith College Museum of Art (1998)
- Treasures of Islamic Art from UMMA Collections University of Michigan Museum of Art (2002-2006)
- Strolling in Isfahan guest curator Sackler Museum, Harvard University (2010)
- Eid al-Fitr: Breaking the Fast curator Calouste Gulbenkian Museum (2017)
- Noruz: Feasting in Spring curator Calouste Gulbenkian Museum (2017)

== See also ==
- Arts of Iran
- Iranian Architecture
- Iranian Modern and Contemporary Art
- Women in the art history field
