= Robert Greenbury =

English artist

Robert Greenbury or Richard Greenbury (fl.1616–1650) was an English painter.

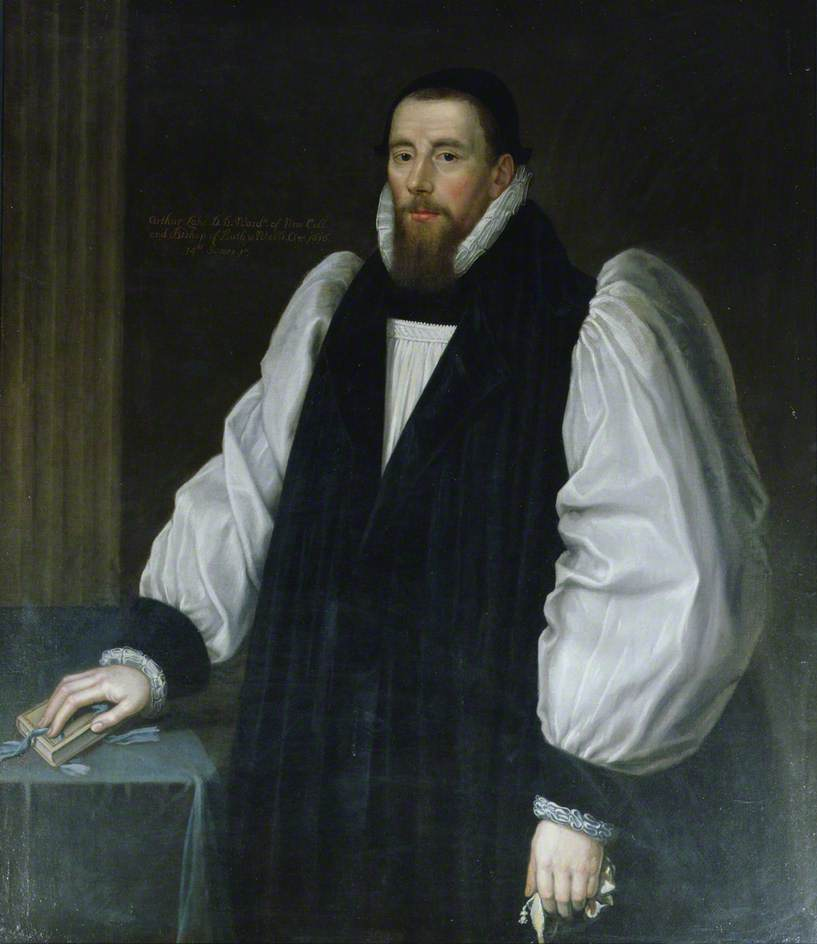
Greenbury's portrait of Arthur Lake

== Life ==
In 1626 Greenbury painted a well-known portrait, of Arthur Lake, bishop of Bath and Wells, for New College, Oxford; the college paid £4 for the work. It was exhibited at the National Portrait Exhibition in 1866. In 1625 Greenbury was employed by the East India Company to paint a large picture giving details of the cruelties inflicted on the English by the Dutch at Amboyna. The picture, which is said to have caused the widow of one of the victims to swoon, was intended to inflame popular passion, and was defaced from motives of foreign policy.

"Robert Greenberry, picture-drawer", figures in the lists of recusants returned by the Westminster justices to the crown in 1628. Among the pictures belonging to Charles I was one of 'Diana and Callisto, bigger than life, a copy after Grimberry,' sold to Captain Geere for 22l. This is more probably a copy by Greenbury, as the king also possessed 'Two copies of Albrecht Dürer and his father, which are done by Mr. Greenbury, by the appointment of the Lord Marshall.' John Evelyn in his 'Diary' writes on 24 Oct. 1664: 'Thence to New College, and the painting of Magdalen Chapel, which is on blue cloth in chiar'oscuro, by one Greenborow, being a Cœna Domini.' This is no longer in its place, and was probably removed in 1829.

Greenbury also painted a picture of William Waynflete, the founder of Magdalen College, Oxford, dated 1638, and one Richard Greenbury in 1632 contracted to supply the chapel there with painted glass. In 1636 Richard Greenbury patented a process for painting with oil colours upon woollen cloth, kerseys, and stuffs for hangings, also on silk for windows.
