= Shamlu =

Oghuz tribe in Iran

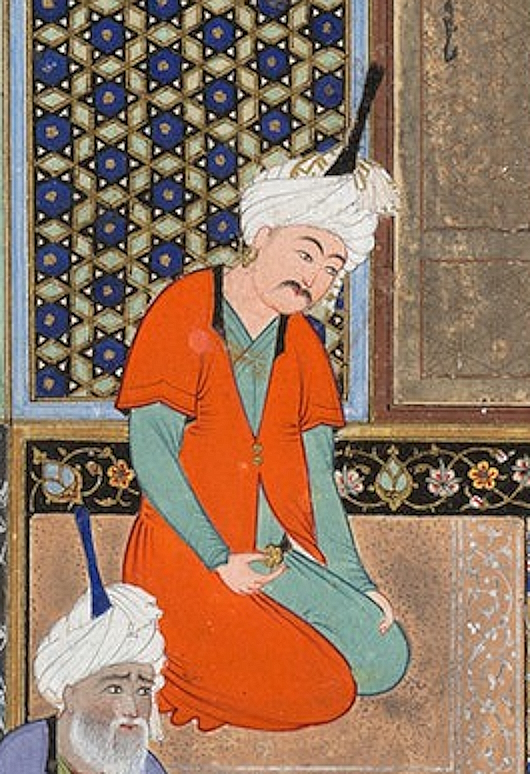
Likely depiction of Hoseyn Khan Shamlu seated, in the Sermon in a mosque scene of the Cartier Hafiz.

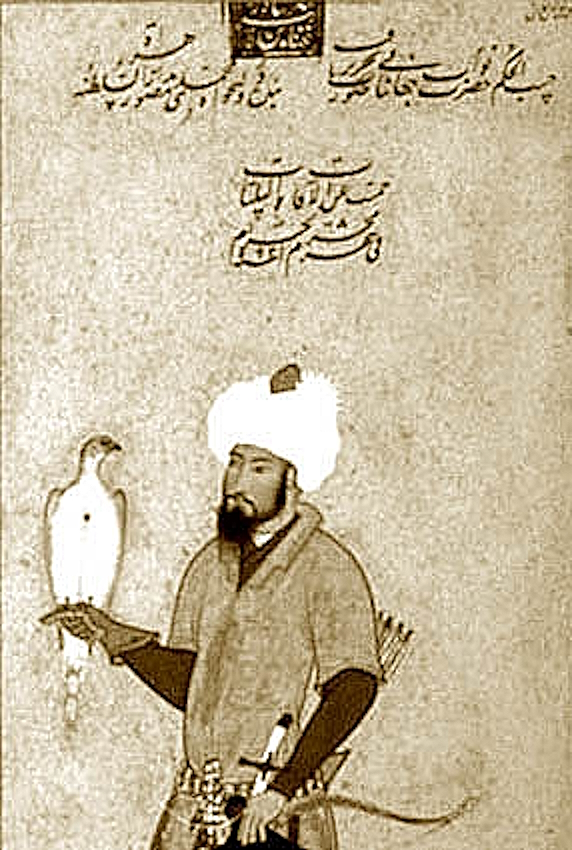
Portrait of Ali-Qoli Khan Shamlu (aka Haji Ali Qizilbash Mazandarani) Governor of Khorassan in 1576 and chief of the armies under Shah Abbas I in 1588.

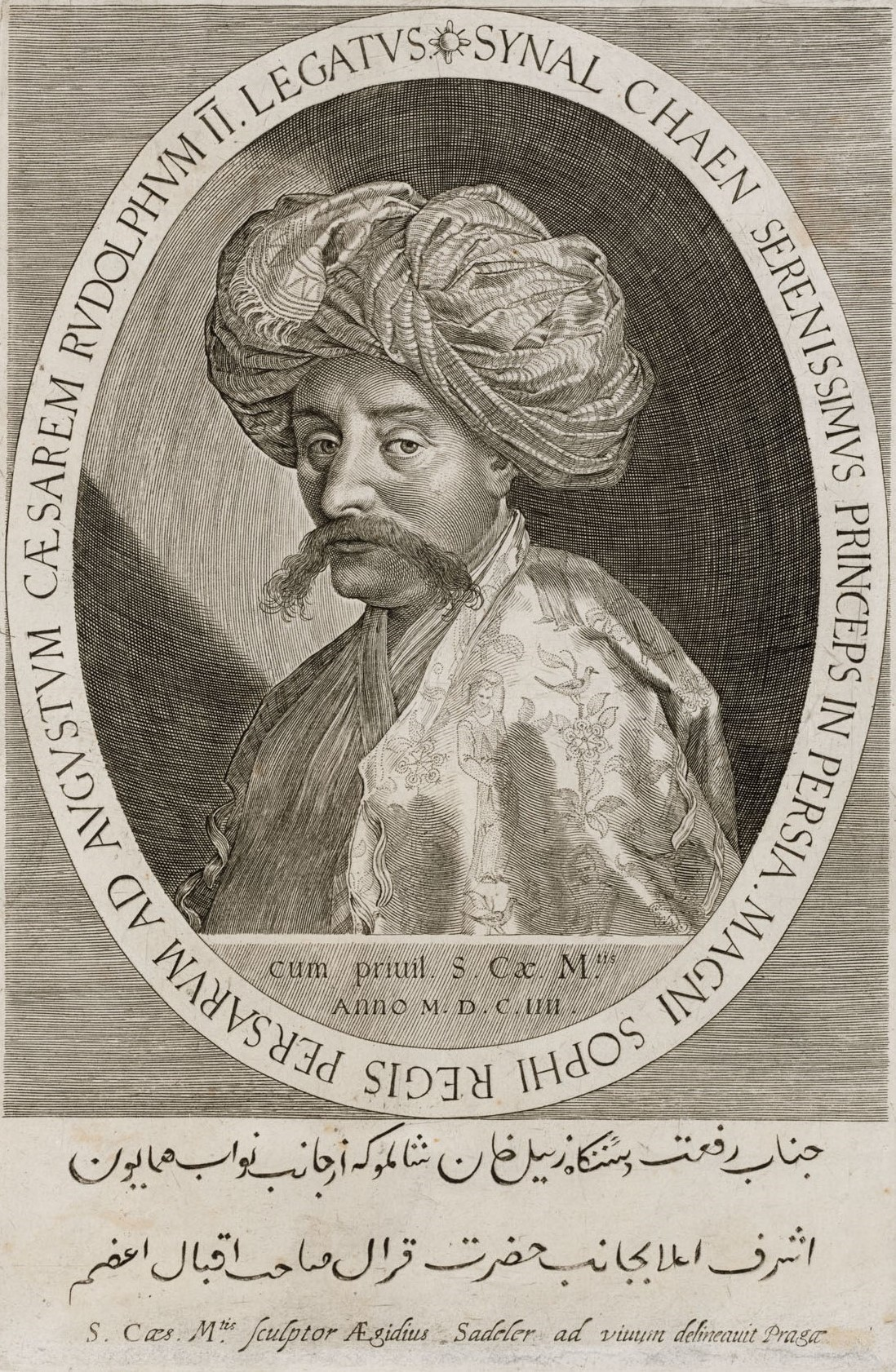
Portrait of Zeynal Khan Shamlu, Ambassador of Shah Abbas I to the Court of the Holy Roman Emperor Rudolf II

The Shamlu tribe (Persian: ایل شاملو; Azerbaijani: Şamlı, Şamlu), also known as the Shamli tribe, was one of the seven original and the most powerful Qizilbash tribes of Turkoman origin in Iran.

Heydar Gholi Khan Ghiaï-e Chamlou II, architect, dressed as Imperial Aide de Camp (Tehran, 1973)

== List of the Khans of Shamlu ==
- Ahmad Sultan Shamlu
- Abdu Beg Shamlu (father in law of Safavid Shah Ismail I)
- Hossein Beg Laleh Shamlu
- Husein Khan Shamlu (The most powerful Qizilbash Khan, executed by Shah Tahmasp I in 1534)
- Hossein Khan Shamlu (Governor of Lors Pushtkuh - Province of Lorestan)
- Hasan Khan Shamlu (Governor of Herat from 1598 to 1618)
- Mirza Vali Khan Shamlu (Governor)
- Ali Gholi Khan Shamlu (also known as Haji Ali Qizilbash Mazandarani, Governor of Khorassan in 1576, Governor of Herat 1577-1589 and military commander under Shah Abbas I in 1588)
- Jani Beg Khan Bigdeli Shamlu (d. 1645), ishik-āqāsi-bāshi (master of ceremony) and qurchi-bāshi (head of the tribal guards) under the Safavid Shah Ṣafi I (r. 1629–42) and Shah Abbās II (r. 1642–66)
- Sinan Khan Shamlu (Zaynal Khan Shamlu, Ambassador of Shah Abbas I to Emperor Rudolph II of the Holy Roman Empire)
- Muhamad Gholi Khan Bigdili-e Shamlu
- Dormish Khan Shamlu (Brother in law of Shah Ismail I and Governor of Isfahan )
- Murteza Gulu Khan Shamlu-Ardabili (invented the Nastaʿlīq calligraphy style, which is used to write many major Iranian languages today)
- Abbas Gholi Khan Shamlu-Shahsevan (Governor of Herat, 1812)
- Mu'min Khan Shamlu (1699–1707, Grand Vizier)
- Mohammed Zaman Khan Shamlu (1711)
- Muhamad Ali Khan Bigdili-e Shamlu (Grand Vizier c. 1722)
- Zaynal Khan Shamlu
- Murshid Gholi Khan Ustajlu-e Shamlu
- Heydar Gholi Khan Ghiaï-e Chamlou I
- Mirza Ali Akbar Khan Ghiaï-e Chamlou
- Manouchehr Ghiaie-e Shamloo (Governor of Tehran)
- Heydar Gholi Khan Ghiaï-e Chamlou II (Architect and Aide de Camp of the Imperial Court of Iran under Shah Mohammad Reza Pahlavi)
- Farhad Khan Ghiaï-e Chamlou (1957)

== Bibliography ==
- Blair, Sheila (2014). Text and image in medieval Persian art. Edinburgh: Edinburgh University Press. ISBN 978-0748655786.
- Yves Bomati and Houchang Nahavandi,Shah Abbas, Emperor of Persia,1587-1629, 2017, ed. Ketab Corporation, Los Angeles, ISBN 978-1595845672, English translation by Azizeh Azodi.
- Roman Ghirshman, Persia El reino immortal, Londres, 1971, p. 141
- J.P. Roux, " Histoire des Turcs", Paris, 1984, pp. 253–54
- David Morgan. "Shah Isma'il and the Establishment of Shi'ism"chpt. 12 of his Medieval Persia: 1040–1797, Longman, New York, 1988, pp. 112–123.
- Soucek, Priscilla (1990). "Sultan Muhammad Tabrizi: Painter at the Safavid Court". Persian masters: five centuries of paintings. Bombay: Marg Publications. pp. 55–58. ISBN 978-8185026107.

== See also ==
- Qizilbash
- Safavid dynasty
- Farhad Khan Ghiaï-e Chamlou (in French)
- Ahmad Shamlou
