= Kathryn Babayan =

American historian

Kathryn Babayan is a professor of early modern Safavid Iran at the University of Michigan. Her research is on the social and cultural history of the Persianate world with a particular focus on gender studies and the history of sexuality.

== Education ==
Babayan graduated with a Ph.D. from Princeton University in 1993 with a dissertation on the end period of the Qezelbash groups.

== Career ==
After her graduation, Babayan's research focus took an interest in mysticism and messianic beliefs in the early Persian world, with her publishing several academic articles on the subject in the mid 1990s. This would ultimately lead to her writing of the monograph titled Mystics, Monarchs, and Messiahs in 2002 that addresses the political, religious, and cultural society of premodern Iran that took a broad view on how each aspect created the resulting Persian understanding of their own history. Her studies then moved to Safavid Iran and how ghulam influenced the development of the Safavid Empire. This resulted in her collaborating on the 2004 book Slaves of the Shah with Sussan Babaie, Ina Baghdiantz McCabe, and Massumeh Farhad.

Earlier, during the May 2003 Radcliffe Seminar at the Harvard Center for Middle Eastern Studies, Babayan met with other academics to discuss current Middle Eastern studies disciplines and how they could be expanded to include elements of comparative literature and queer theory. The gathering decided to adopt the term "Islamicate" to encompass this new field, meant to mirror the already in use term "Italianate" in Italian studies. The aim of the term is to reflect research on Islamic history that isn't specifically about theological subjects. For Babayan, this meant an investigation into the ideas of gender and sexuality in historical Islamic societies, which she became an editor for and contributor to the resulting 2008 anthology named Islamicate sexualities.

Babayan's new dedication to the use of sexuality and specifically eroticism in the era of early Iran resulted in her studying anthologies written during the reign of Abbas the Great. These collected works also featured both the ideology and mystic beliefs of the Safavids. As each work was compiled by a separate commoner in the urban environment of Isfahan, Babayan argued that they together represented a viewpoint that was highly tinged with eroticism and understanding of sexual and romantic love from different classes of society. This research would culminate in her 2021 book The City As Anthology.

After the publication of this book, Babayan established the Isfahan Anthology Project at the University of Michigan to more extensively study such anthologies, referred to as majmu'a, alongside University of Isfahan historian Nozhat Ahmadi. The goal is to create a digital platform that academics around the world can contribute to and also access the combined anthologies for their own research. She also received in 2024 a National Endowment for the Humanities fellowship to fund her next book publication titled The Persian Anthology: Reading with the Margins, which investigates the differing reading practices within that early period of Isfahan.

== Bibliography ==
- — (1993). The Waning of the Qizilbash: The Spiritual and the Temporal in Seventeenth Century Iran. Princeton University Press. p. 692.
- — (2002). Mystics, Monarchs, and Messiahs: Cultural Landscapes of Early Modern Iran. Harvard University Press. p. 575. ISBN 9780932885289.
- —; Babaie, Sussan; Baghdiantz-MacCabe, Ina; Mussumeh, Farhad (2004). Slaves of the Shah: New Elites of Safavid Iran. I.B. Tauris. p. 256. ISBN 9780857716866.
- —; Najmabadi, Afsaneh, eds. (2008). Islamicate Sexualities: Translations Across Temporal Geographies of Desire. Center for Middle Eastern Studies of Harvard University. p. 376. ISBN 9780674032040.
- —; Pifer, Michael, eds. (2018). An Armenian Mediterranean: Words and Worlds in Motion. Springer International Publishing. p. 337. ISBN 9783319728650.
- — (2021). The City as Anthology: Eroticism and Urbanity in Early Modern Isfahan. Stanford University Press. p. 280. ISBN 9781503627833.
