= List of Safavid monarchs =

King of Kings of Iran
- Imperial
- Emblem of Iran (1423–1979)

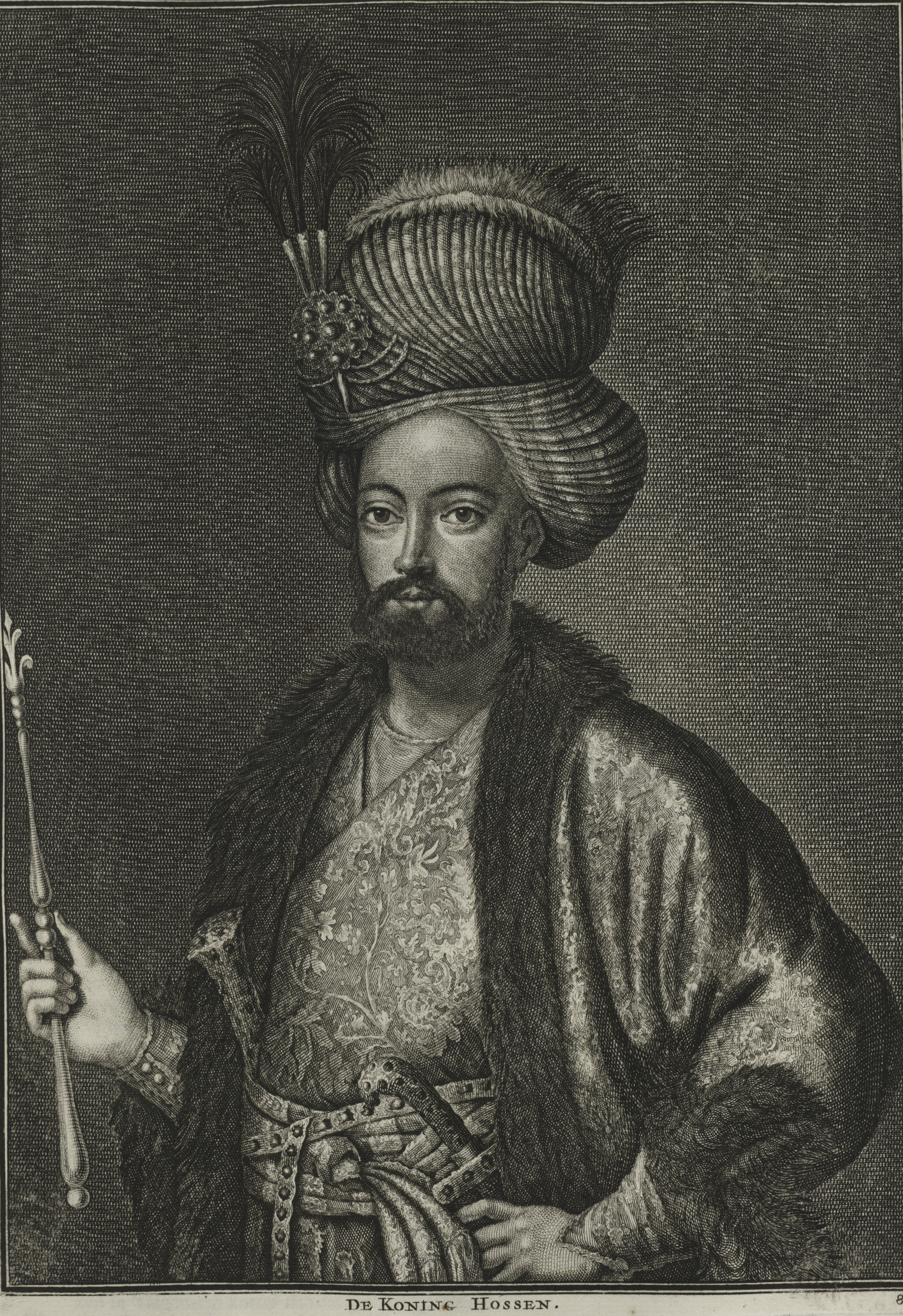
- Last to reign Soltan Hoseyn; 6 August 1694 – 21 October 1722

Details
- First monarch: Ismail I (1501–1524)
- Last monarch: Soltan Hoseyn (r. 1694–1722) (de jure); Abbas III (r. 1732–1736) (de facto)
- Formed: 22 December 1501
- Abolished: 8 March 1736
- Residences: Hasht Behesht (1501–1555); Chehel Sotun (1555–1598); Ali Qapu (1598–1736)
- Appointer: Hereditary

, The Safavid monarchs were the rulers of Iran after the establishment of the Safavid Empire by Shah Ismail I following his victory over the Aq Qoyunlu at the Siege of Tabriz in 1501.

The following table lists all the Safavid monarchs of Iran.

== List of Safavid monarchs ==
No.	Portrait	Name	Reign	Parents	Life details
1		Ismail I ابوالمظفر شاه اسمعیل یکم الحسینی الموسوی الصفوی بهادرخان; Abu’l Muzaffar Shah Ismail Yekom al-Husayni al-Musavi al-Safavi Bahadur Khan	12 December 1501 – 23 May 1524 (~23 years)	Shaykh Haydar; Alamshah Begum	17 July 1487 – 23 May 1524 (aged 36): Unified Iran under his rule, with Tabriz as the capital.; Declared Shi'ism as state religion.; Victory against the Uzbeks (1510); Defeated in the Battle of Chaldiran
2		Tahmasp I ابوالمظفر شاه تهماسب یکم الحسینی الموسوی الصفوی بهادر خان; Abu’l Muzaffar Shah Tahmasp Yekom al-Husayni al-Musavi al-Safavi Bahadur Khan	23 May 1524 – 25 May 1576 (~52 years)	Ismail I; Tajlu Khanum	22 February 1514 – 25 May 1576 (aged 62): Treaty of Amasya with Ottomans; parts of Georgia, Armenia and Iraq ceded.; Gave refuge to Humayun and Şehzade Bayezid.; Moved the capital to Qazvin.
3		Ismail II ابوالمظفر شاه اسمعیل ثانی الحسینی الموسوی الصفوی بهادر خان; Abu’l Muzaffar Shah Ismail Dovom al-Husayni al-Musavi al-Safavi Bahadur Khan	22 August 1576 – 24 November 1577 (~1 year)	Tahmasp I; Sultanum Begum	31 May 1537 – 24 November 1577 (aged 40): Defeated his brother Haidar Mirza in a war of succession with help of Qizilbash.; Executed most of his relatives after coming to power.; Possibly poisoned.
4		Mohammad Khodabanda ابوالمظفر شاه سلطان محمد الحسینی الموسوی الصفوی بهادر خان; Abu’l Muzaffar Shah Sultan Mohammad al-Husayni al-Musavi al-Safavi Bahadur Khan	11 February 1578 – 1 October 1587 (~9 years)	Tahmasp I; Sultanum Begum	1532 – 1595 (aged 64): Brother of Ismail II.; Secession of the Caucasus, Armenia and Azerbaijan to Ottomans.; Secession of Khorasan province to Uzbeks.; Defeated by his son for throne; imprisoned at Alamut for rest of his life.
5		Abbas I ابوالمظفر شاه عباس یکم الحسینی الموسوی الصفوی بهادر خان; Abu’l Muzaffar Shah Abbas Yekom al-Husayni al-Musavi al-Safavi Bahadur Khan	1 October 1587 – 19 January 1629 (~41 years)	Mohammad Khodabanda; Khayr al-Nisa Begum	27 January 1571 – 19 January 1629 (aged 57): Peace with the Ottomans.; Moved the capital to Isfahan.; Recapture of Tabriz, Urmia, and Armenia from Ottomans; conquest of Tbilisi, Iraqi Kurdistan and Baghdad.; Recapture of Kandahar from Mughals.; Invasion of Hormuz and expulsion of Portuguese from southern Iran.
6		Safi I ابوالمظفر شاه صفی یکم الحسینی الموسوی الصفوی بهادر خان; Abu’l Muzaffar Shah Safi Yekom al-Husayni al-Musavi al-Safavi Bahadur Khan	28 January 1629 – 12 May 1642 (~13 years)	Mohammad Baqer Mirza; Dilaram Khanum	1611 – 12 May 1642 (aged 31): Grandson of Abbas I.; Baghdad and Kandahar lost; Treaty of Zuhab with the Ottomans.
7		Abbas II ابوالمظفر شاه عباس دوم الحسینی الموسوی الصفوی بهادر خان; Abu’l Muzaffar Shah Abbas Dovom al-Husayni al-Musavi al-Safavi Bahadur Khan	15 May 1642 – 26 October 1666 (~24 years)	Safi I; Anna Khanum	30 August 1632 – 26 October 1666 (aged 34): Recapture of Kandahar.; Russo-Persian War (1651–1653)
8		Suleiman I ابوالمظفر شاه سلیمان یکم الحسینی الموسوی الصفوی بهادر خان; Abu’l Muzaffar Shah Suleiman Yekom al-Husayni al-Musavi al-Safavi Bahadur Khan	1 November 1666 – 29 July 1694 (~28 years)	Abbas II; Nakihat Khanum	February 1648 – 29 July 1694 (aged 46): Crowned as Safi II initially, and then later as Suleiman I (1668).; Construction of Hasht Behesht.
9		Hussain ابوالمظفر شاه سلطان حسین الحسینی الموسوی الصفوی بهادر خان; Abu’l Muzaffar Shah Sultan Husayn al-Husayni al-Musavi al-Safavi Bahadur Khan	6 August 1694 – 21 October 1722 (~28 years)	Suleiman I	October 1668 – 9 September 1727 (aged 59): Fall of Kerman province to Hotaks.; Forced to abdicate after the fall of Isfahan to Hotaks.; Executed on orders of Ashraf Hotak.
10		Tahmasp II ابوالمظفر شاه تهماسب دوم الحسینی الموسوی الصفوی بهادر خان; Abu’l Muzaffar Shah Tahmasp Dovom al-Husayni al-Musavi al-Safavi Bahadur Khan	10 November 1722 – 16 April 1732 (~10 years)	Hussain	1704 – 11 February 1740 (aged 36): Fled to Qazvin after fall of Isfahan and declared himself ruler.; Deposed by Nader Afshar in favor of his son.; Murdered by Reza Qoli Mirza.
11		Abbas III ابوالمظفر شاه عباس سوم الحسینی الموسوی الصفوی بهادر خان; Abu’l Muzaffar Shah Abbas Sevom al-Husayni al-Musavi al-Safavi Bahadur Khan	16 April 1732 – 22 January 1736 (~4 years)	Tahmasp II; Shahpari Begum	January 1732 – February 1740 (aged 8): Installed by Nader Afshar as nominal ruler; eventually deposed by him.; Murdered by Reza Qoli Mirza.

== See also ==
- Safavid dynasty family tree
- List of mothers of the Safavid shahs

== Sources ==
- Babaie, Sussan; Babayan, Kathryn; Baghdiantz-MacCabe, Ina; Farhad, Mussumeh (2004). Slaves of the Shah: New Elites of Safavid Iran. Library of Middle East History. London: I. B. Tauris. ISBN 9781788310864.
- Newman, Andrew J. (2006). Safavid Iran: Rebirth of a Persian Empire. Library of Middle East History. London, UK: I. B. Tauris. ISBN 1-86064-667-0.
- Savory, Roger M. (1980). Iran under the Safavids. Cambridge, UK: Cambridge University Press. ISBN 0-521-22483-7. LCCN 78073817.
- Thorne, John O., ed. (1984). "Abbas I". Chambers Biographical Dictionary. Edinburgh, UK: Chambers Harrap. ISBN 0-550-18022-2. LCCN 2010367095.
