= Shaykh 'Abbasi =

17th century Persian painter

Shaykh 'Abbasi (Persian: شیخ عباسی; fl. 1650–1684) was a Persian painter known for incorporating European and Indian influences into his illustrations, a practice later adopted by Mohammad Zaman and Aliquli Jabbadar. His style evolved to become more Indian as his career went on – he painted Mughal emperors and drew particularly Indian heads, using similar techniques. His work has been proposed as evidence of a cultural exchange between 17th-century Iranian artists and Golconda artists from the same time period.

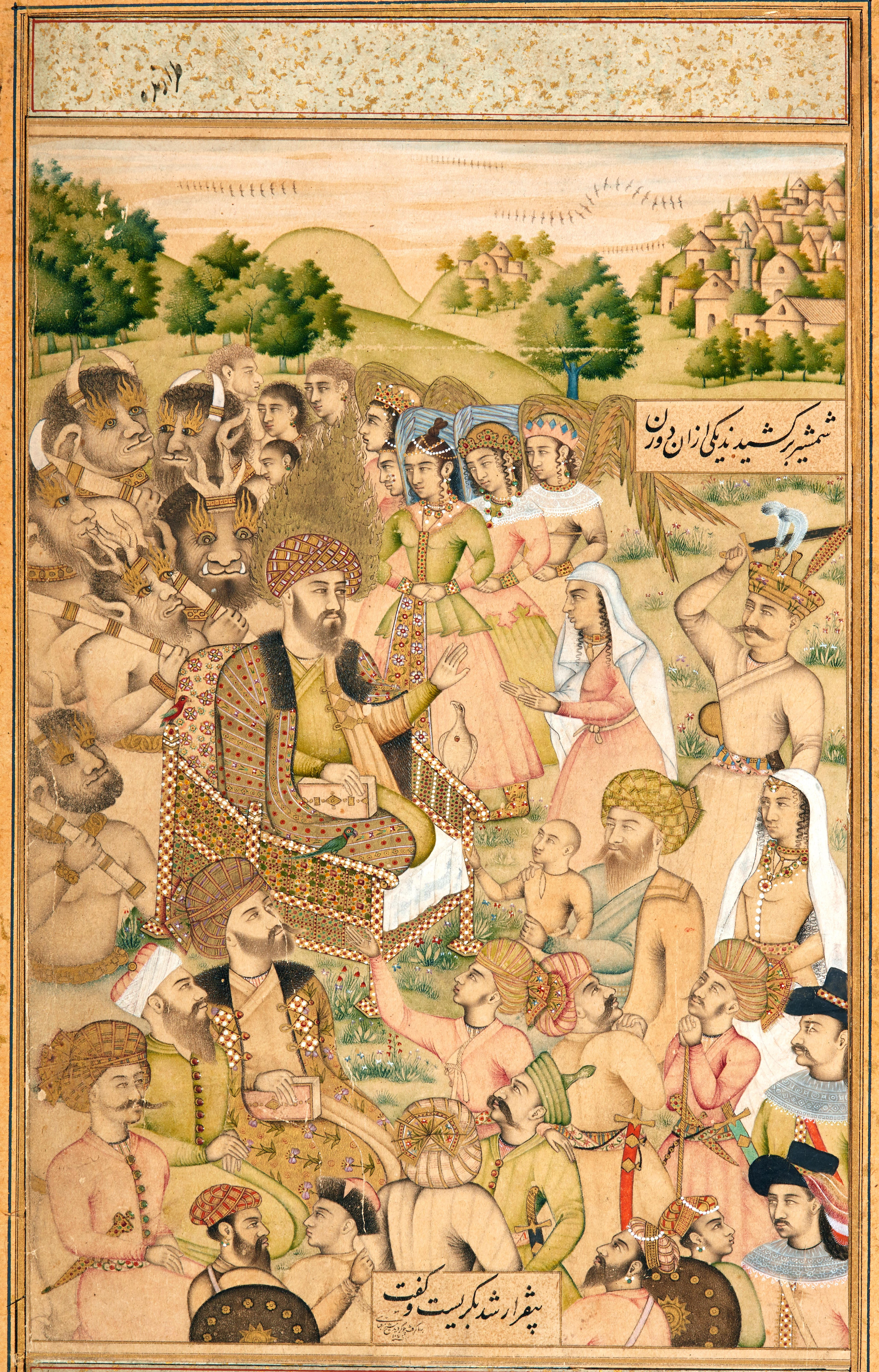
The Judgment of Solomon, Isfahan 1664. Davids Museum Copenhagen.

A total of 25 paintings have been attributed to Shaykh 'Abbasi, including illuminations from manuscripts and miniatures featuring, among other subjects, Safavid emperors and the Madonna and Child, colored in pale, transparent tones. Given the activities of contemporaneous artists, it is highly likely that he also painted on objects made from papier-mâché that was lacquered. He trained his two sons, 'Ali Naqi and Mohammad Taqi, in the same style.

== Gallery ==
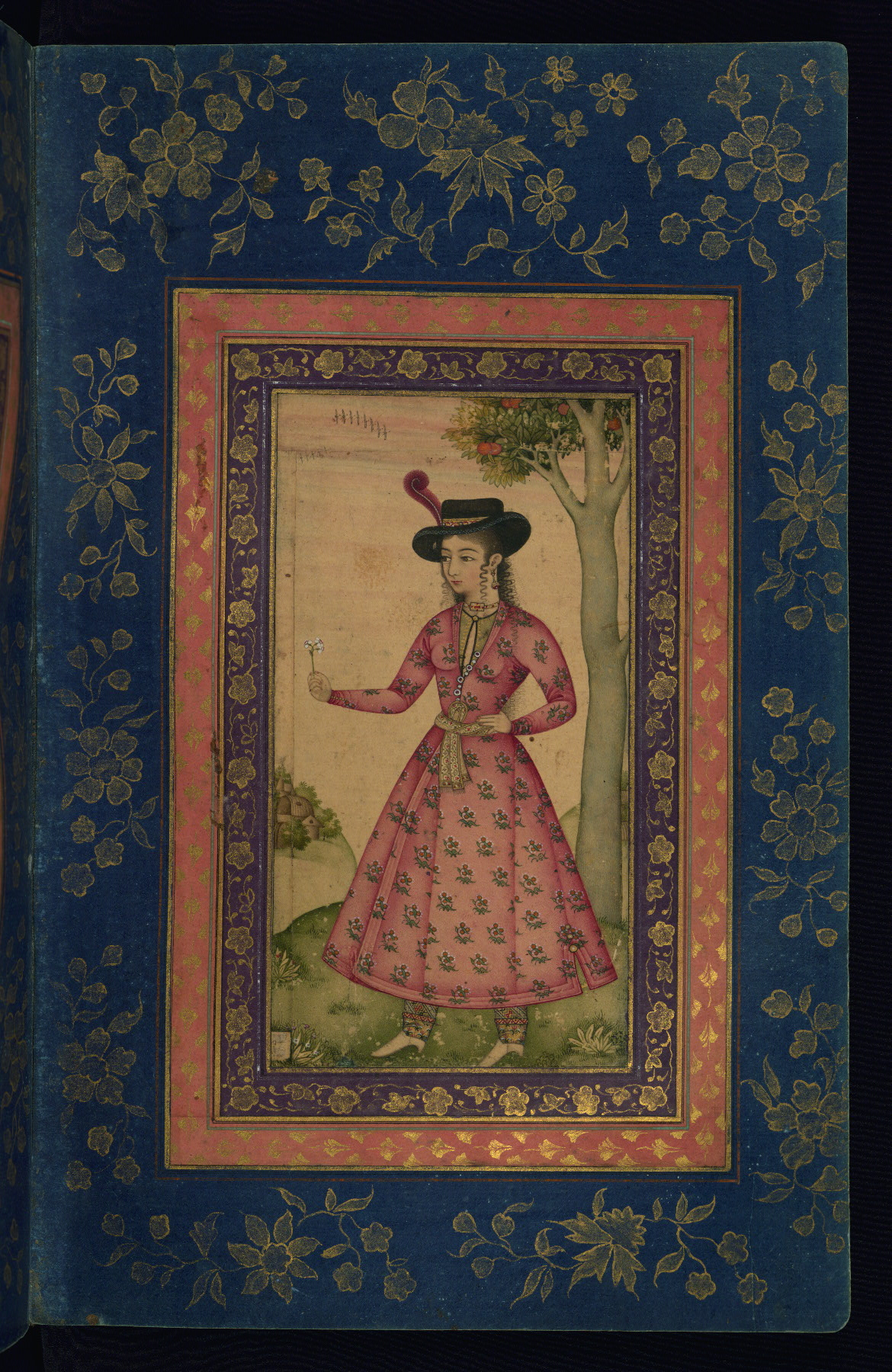
Woman in a European hat holding a flower, fol 18b from an album in the Walters Collection.

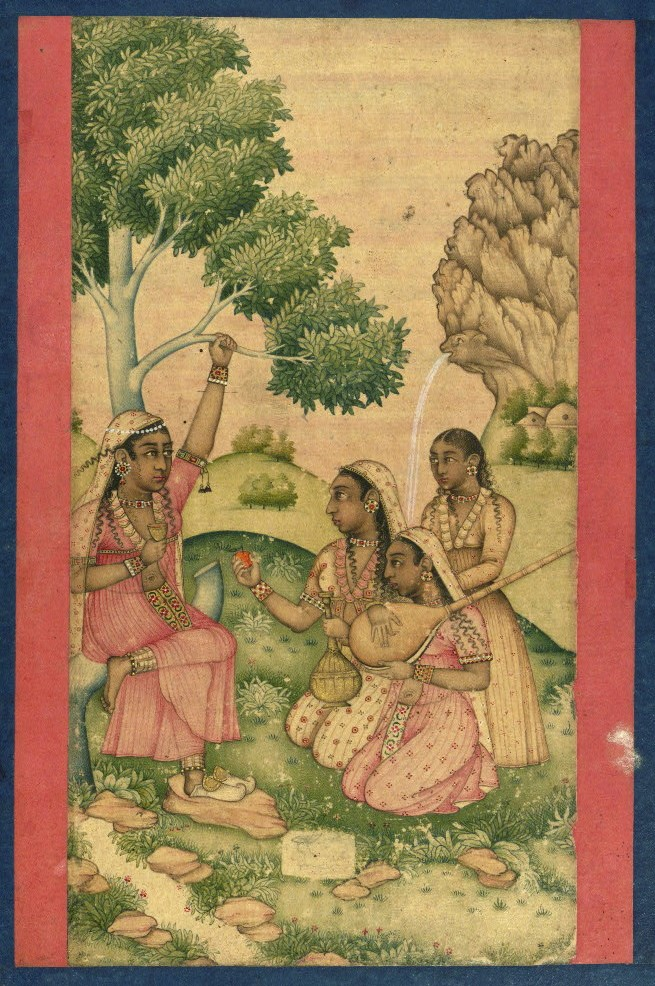
A young Indian woman entertained by female musicians. Fol 60b from an album in the Walters Museum collection.jpg

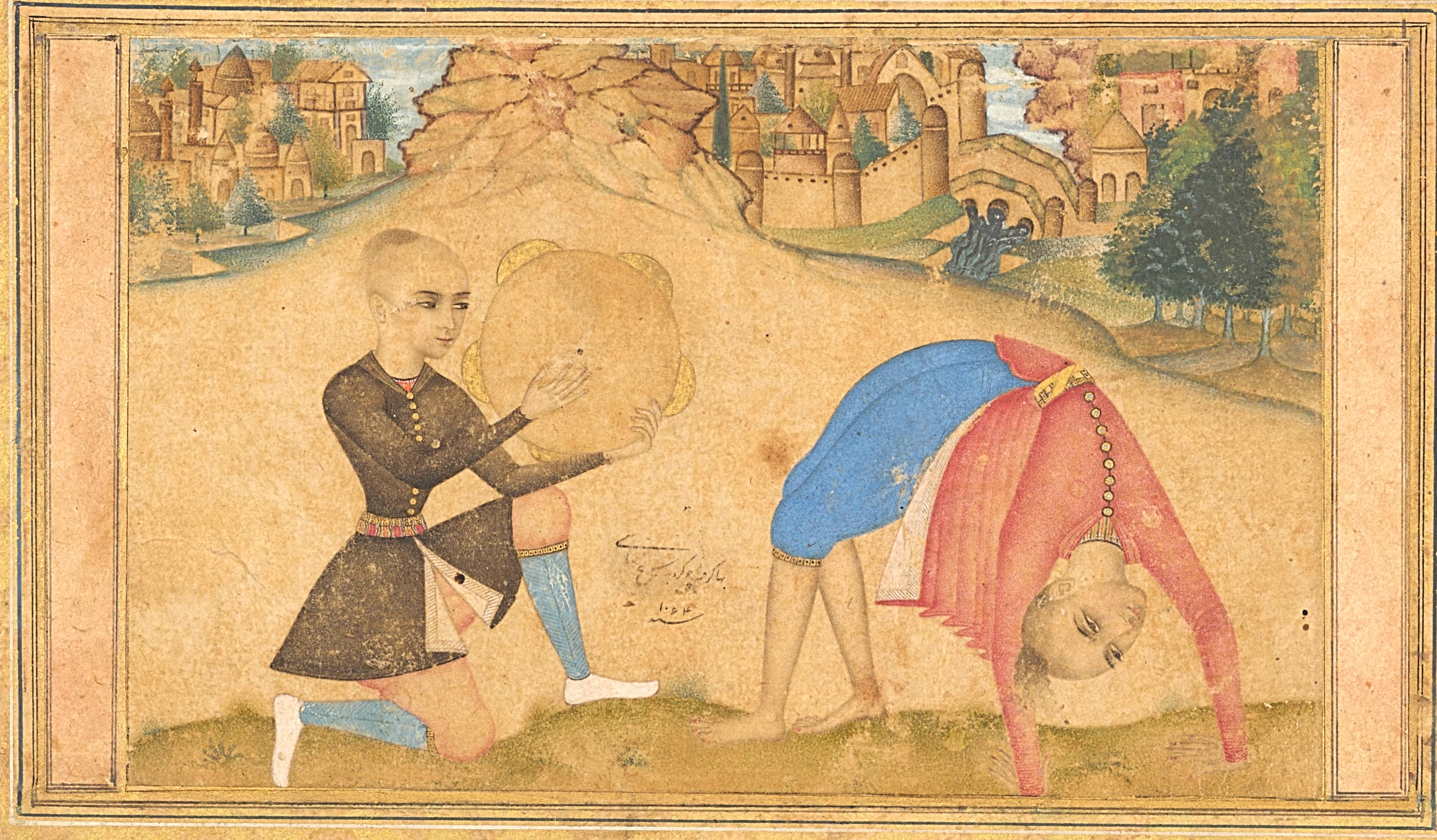
Musician & acrobat, 1653/54. Chester Beatty Library

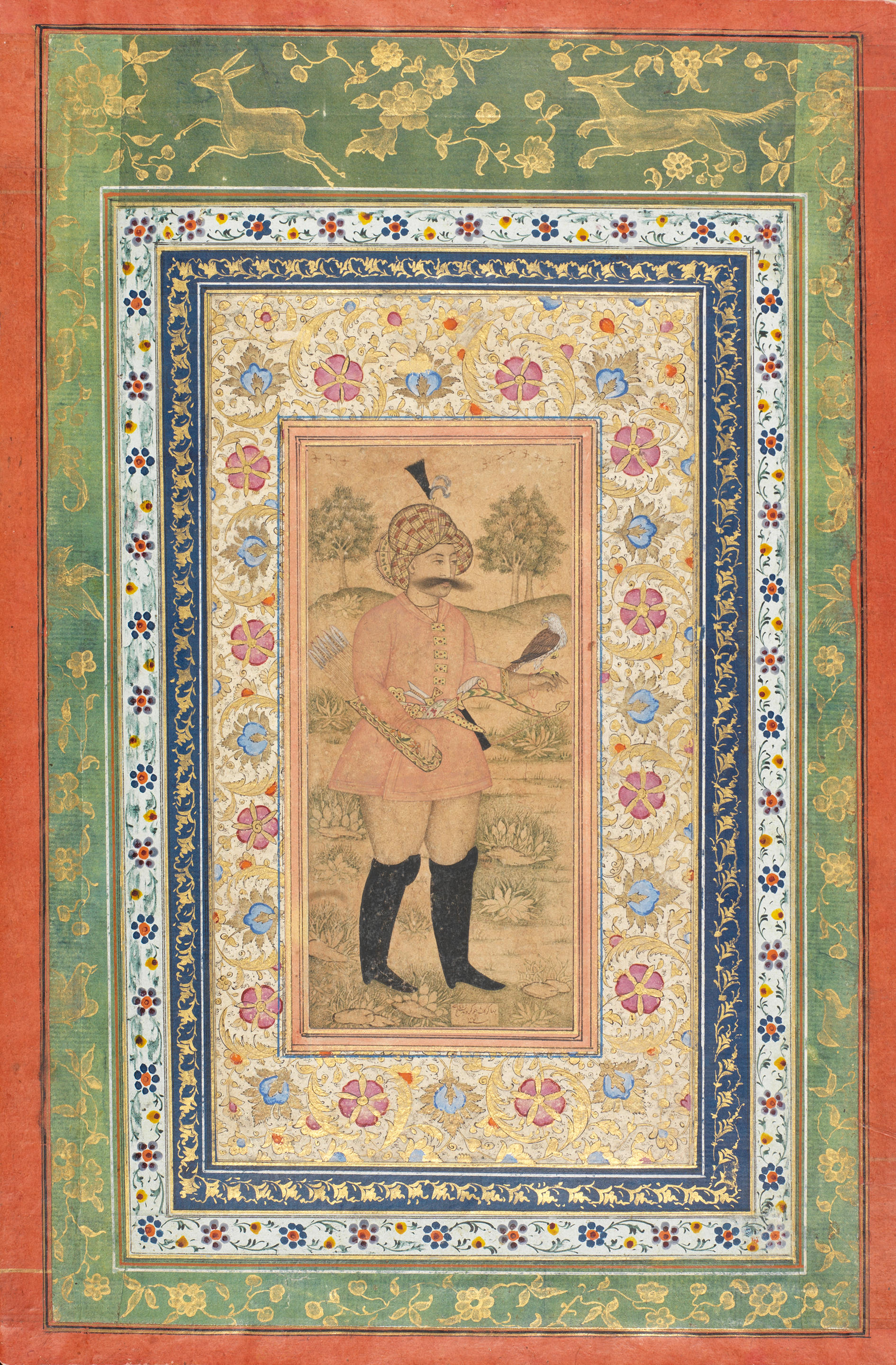
A Safavid nobleman standing in a landscape, 1660/61

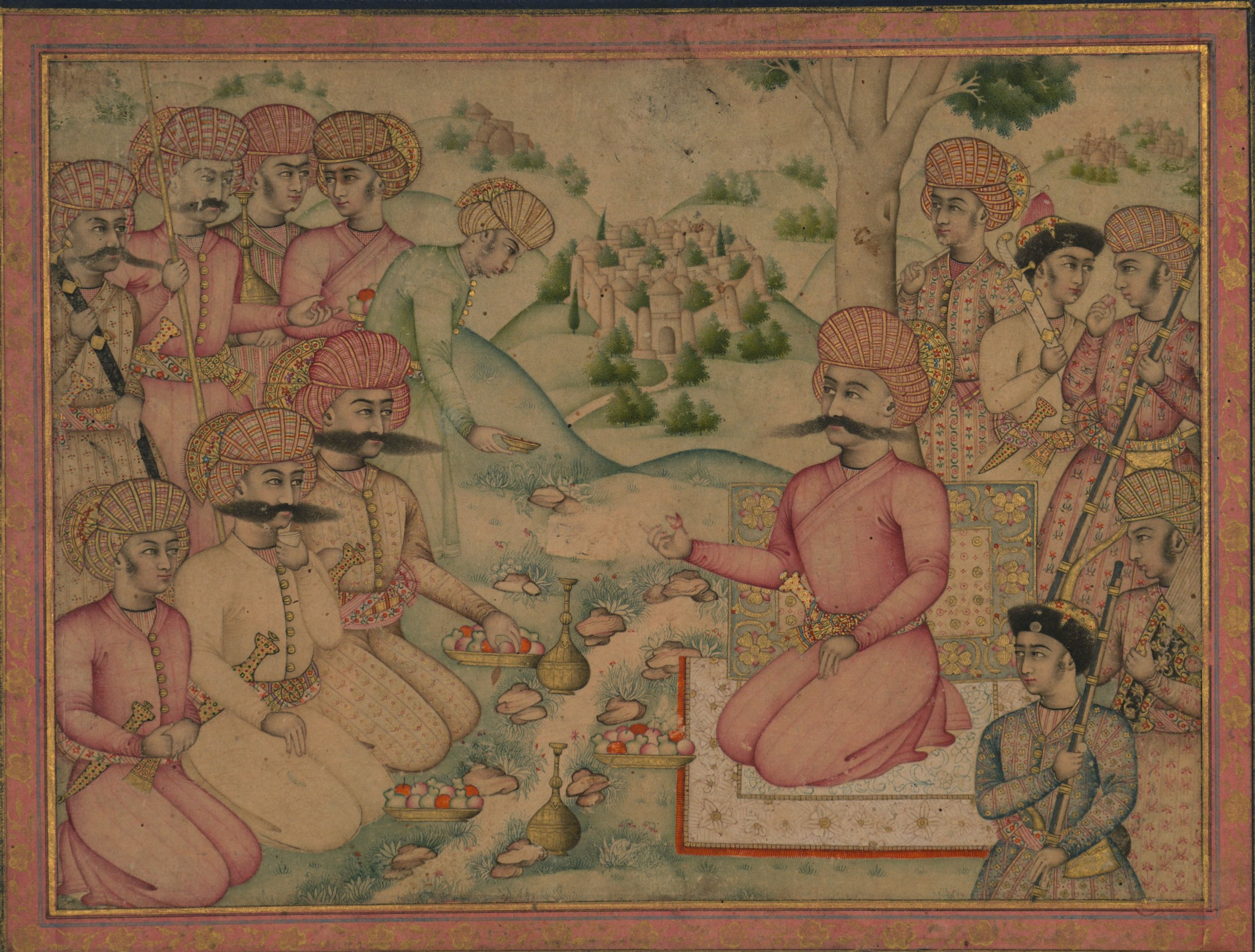
Court scene of shah Abbas II

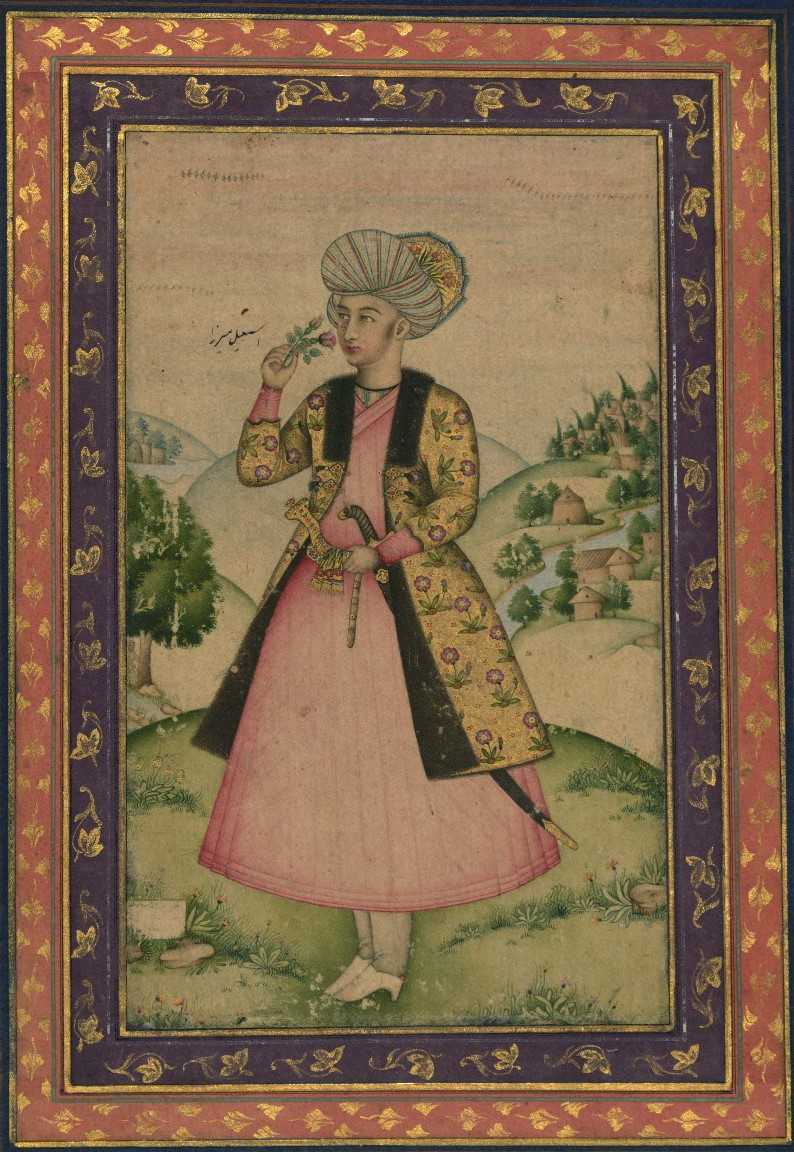
Portrait of Ismail Mirza

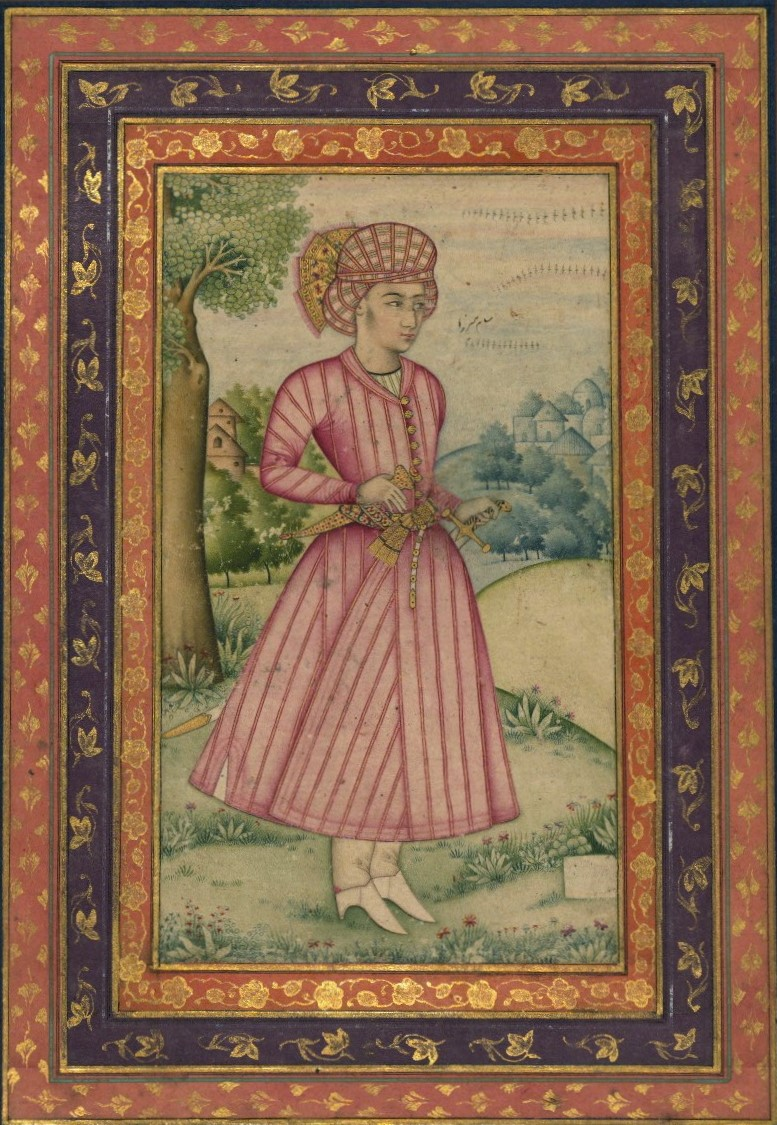
Portrait of Sam Mirza

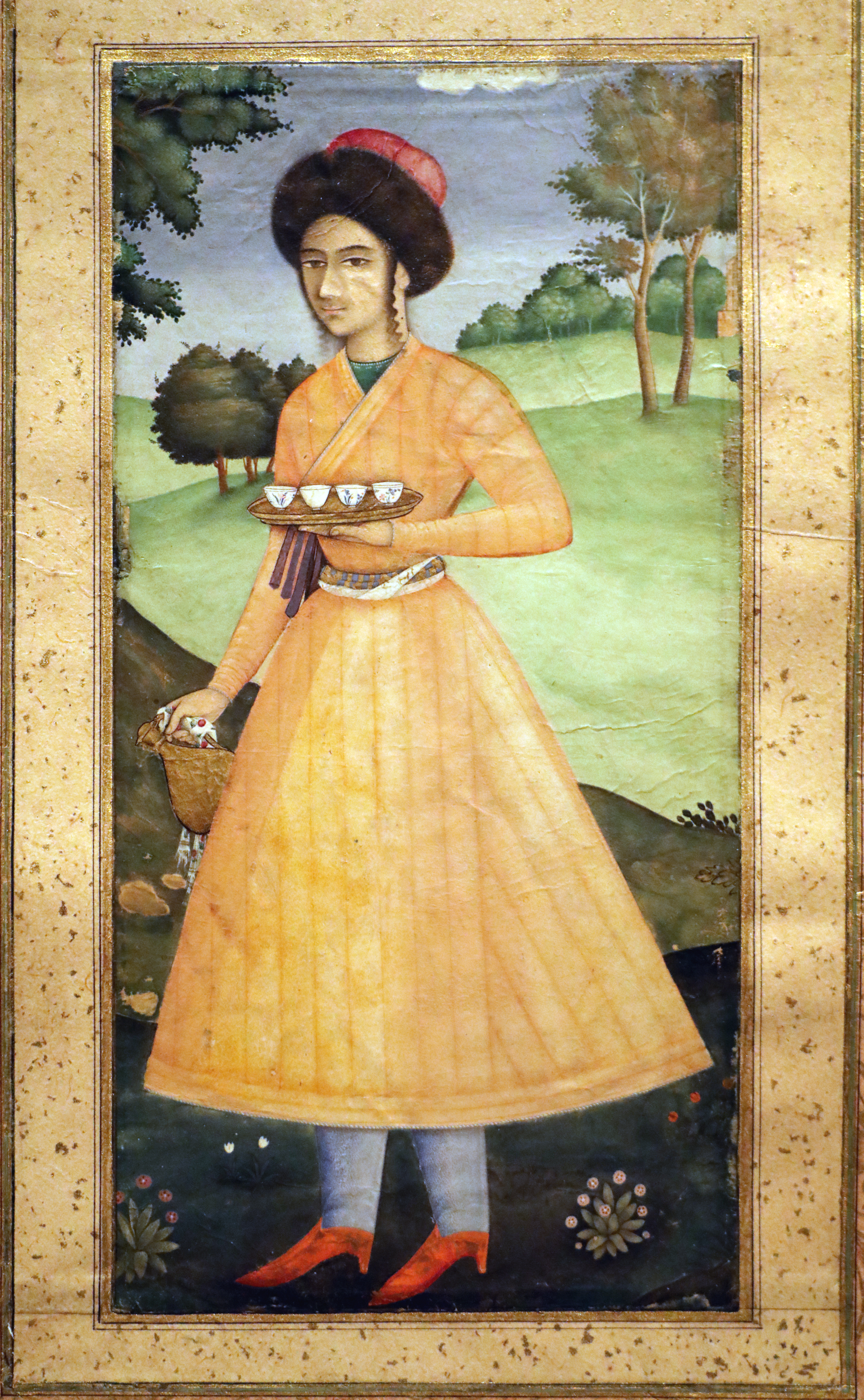
Portrait of a young man, 1650–75

== See also ==
Bahram Sofrakesh - another Iranian painter influenced by Deccan (Golconda?) art in the 17th century
