= List of mothers of the Safavid shahs =

This list includes the biological mothers of Safavid shahs. There were eleven shahs (kings) of the Safavid Empire in ten generations. Throughout 235-years history the shahs were all members of the same house, the house of Safavid.

Name (Birth Name)	Son	Ethnicity
Safavid Iran
Alam-Shah Begum (Halima, Mart[h]a)	Ismail I	half Pontic Greek - half Turcoman
Tajlu Khanum (Shah-Begi Khanum)	Tahmasp I	Turcoman
Sultanum Begum	Ismail II and Mohammad Khodabanda	Turcoman
Khayr al-Nisa Begum	Abbas I	Mazanderani
Dilaram Khanum	Shah Safi	Georgian
Anna Khanum	Abbas II	Circassian
Nakihat Khanum	Suleiman I of Persia	Circassian
Unknown	Sultan Husayn	Circassian
After the Siege of Isfahan
Unknown	Tahmasp II	Unknown
Shahpari Begum	Abbas III	Unknown
After Nader Shah
Shahrbanu Begum	Suleiman II	Unknown
Khan Aqa Begum or Maryam Begum	Ismail III	Unknown

== See also ==
- Safavid dynasty family tree

== Sources ==
- Matthee, R. (2012). "Sulṭān Ḥusayn". In P. Bearman; Th. Bianquis; C.E. Bosworth; E. van Donzel; W.P. Heinrichs (eds.). The Encyclopedia of Islam, Second Edition. Brill Online. doi:10.1163/1573-3912_islam_SIM_7180.
- Newman, Andrew J. (2008). Safavid Iran: Rebirth of a Persian Empire. I.B.Tauris. ISBN 978-0857716613.
