= Anna Khanum =

Royal consort of Safavid Shah Safi (died 1647)

Queen mother of Safavid Iran
- Tenure: 1642–1647
- Predecessor: Dilaram Khanum
- Successor: Nakihat Khanum
- Died: 9 September 1647
- Spouse: Safi of Persia
- Issue: Abbas II
- House: Safavid (by marriage)
- Religion: Shia Islam

Anna Khanum (Persian: آنا خانم; died 9 September 1647) was the consort of the Safavid Shah Safi (r. 1629–1642). She was the mother of her husband's successor, Shah Abbas II (r. 1642–1666).

== Early life ==
Anna Khanum was of Circassian origin. She came (likely via the Black Sea slave trade) to the Safavid imperial harem where she was given as slave concubine to Shah Safi, the son of Mohammad Baqer Mirza, the eldest son of Abbas I (r. 1588–1629). She became the mother of Abbas II. The Safavid shahs did not marry, but reproduced through slave concubines, who became their consorts.

== As queen mother ==
After Safi's death in 1642, his son Abbas II ascended the throne. A triumvirate consisting of Saru Taqi, Mohammad Ali Khan and Jani Khan Shamlu, worked in alliance with Anna Khanum and effectively wielded power at the court for the first three years of Abbas's reign. Saru Taqi maintained his position as grand vizier. Anna Khanum was his ally and the one to consolidate power within his faction. Jean Chardin, a French jeweller and traveller, noted their friendship and collaboration in his discussion after Abbas's accession to the throne in 1645. He said the following about them:

The power of mothers of Persian kings looms large when they [shahs] are at a young age. Abbas II's mother had much influence, which was absolute. She [the queen mother] was in close contact with the prime minister and they would help each other. Saru Taqi was the agent and confidant of the queen mother; he would gather immense fortunes for her. She governed Persia at her will through her minister.

Saru Taqi was assassinated by Jani Khan, probably with Abbas's consent who was attempting to gain independence from his mother and her slave allies. Anna Khanum was extremely angry at Jani Khan. She sent one of her principal eunuchs, probably the eldest, rish sefid of the harem to Jani Khan, asking him to explain his actions. He responded rudely calling Saru Taqi a dog and a thief, and then proceeded to insult Anna Khanum personally.

Following the murder, Jani Khan himself was betrayed by the royal sommelier, Safi Qoli Beg (son of Amir Beg Armani), who feared that the ultimate objective of the conspiracy was the overthrow of the Shah himself. But the real inspiration behind the terrible revenge that followed was Anna Khanum. Jani Khan was assassinated four days after he executed Saru Taqi.

== Sponsorships ==
Anna Khanum is known to have sponsored the construction of a mosque and a school in the Abbasabad suburb of the royal capital Isfahan.

== Death ==
Anna Khanum died on 9 September 1647.

== Sources ==
- Babaie, Sussan; Babayan, Kathryn; Baghdiantz-McCabe, Ina; Farhad, Massumeh (2004). Slaves of the Shah: New Elites of Safavid Iran. I.B.Tauris. ISBN 978-0857716866.
- Babayan, Kathryn (2002). Mystics, Monarchs, and Messiahs: Cultural Landscapes of Early Modern Iran. Harvard CMES. ISBN 978-0-932-88528-9.
- Newman, Andrew J. (2008). Safavid Iran: Rebirth of a Persian Empire. I.B.Tauris. ISBN 978-0857716613.
- Matthee, Rudi (2012). Persia in Crisis: Safavid Decline and the Fall of Isfahan. I.B.Tauris. ISBN 978-1-845-11745-0.
