= Aliquli Jabbadar =

Iranian painter (1666–1694)

Naqqash-Bashi Aliquli Jabbadar Beg
- علیقلی جبه‌دار
- Years active: 1666–1694
- Notable work: See gallery
- Style: Farangi-Sazi

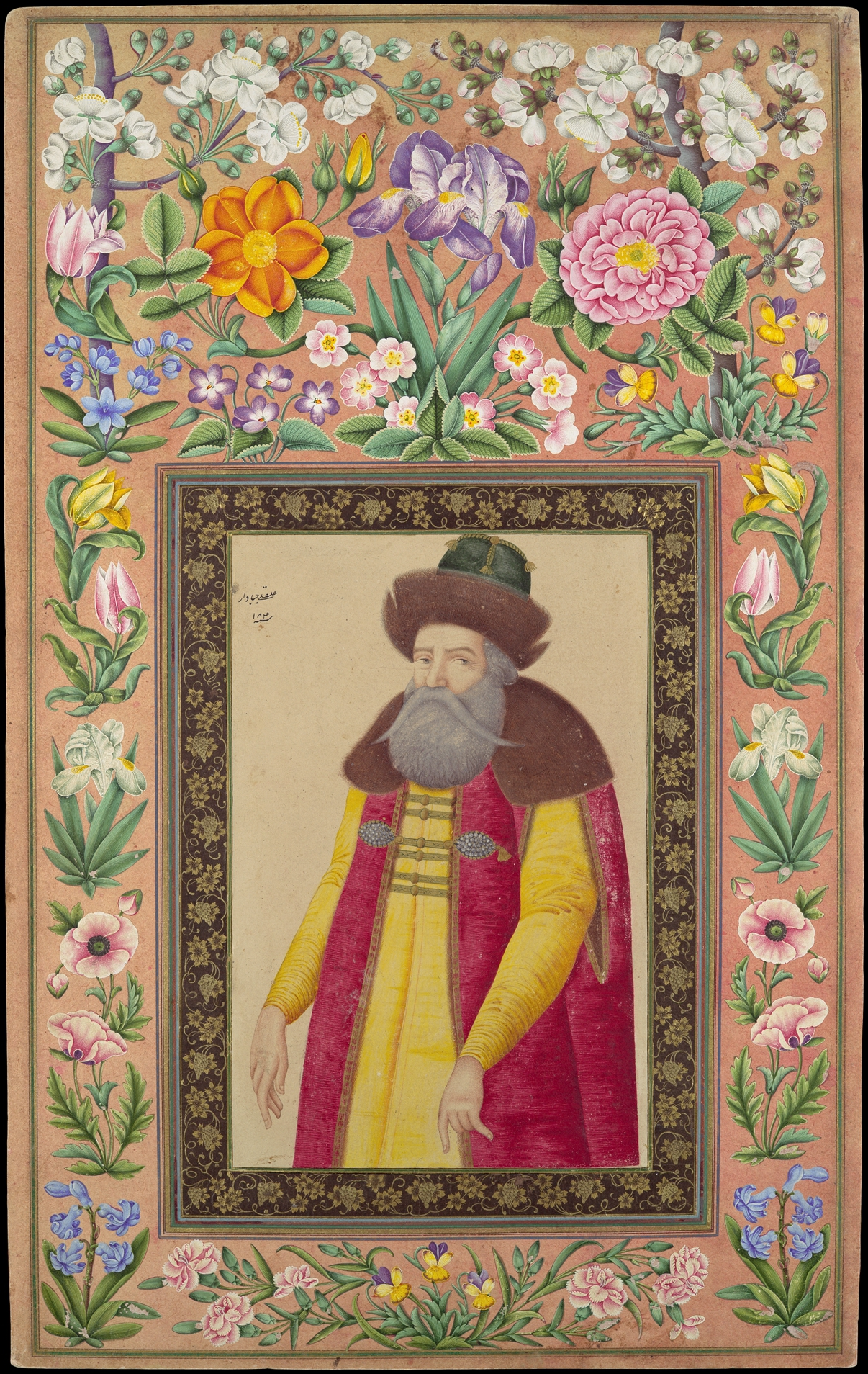
Portrait of the Russian Ambassador, Prince Andrey Priklonskiy, Folio from the Davis Album. Iran, 1673–1674. Metropolitan Museum of Art

Aliquli Jabbadar (Persian: علیقلی جبه‌دار, romanized: ‘Alī-qolī Jabbadār; fl. 1666 – 1694) was an Iranian Georgian artist, one of the first to have incorporated European influences in the traditional Safavid-era miniature painting. He is known for his scenes of the Safavid courtly life, especially his careful rendition of the physical setting and of details of dress.

Jabbadar's name appears on a number of miniatures dating from the 17th century, including four from the State Hermitage in Russia and four from the Metropolitan Museum of Arts in the United States. In one of the signatures, the artist refers himself to as farangi, "the Frank", a reference to his European, or more probably, to Georgian and Christian origin. Furthermore, two of his paintings bear Georgian inscriptions. He also referred himself as ghulāmzāda-i qadimi ("former slave"), beg ("lord"), naqqash-bashi ("head of mosaics") and jabbadār ("keeper of the armory"), suggesting that he was one of those ghulām, who rose to ranks at the Safavid court.

== Gallery ==
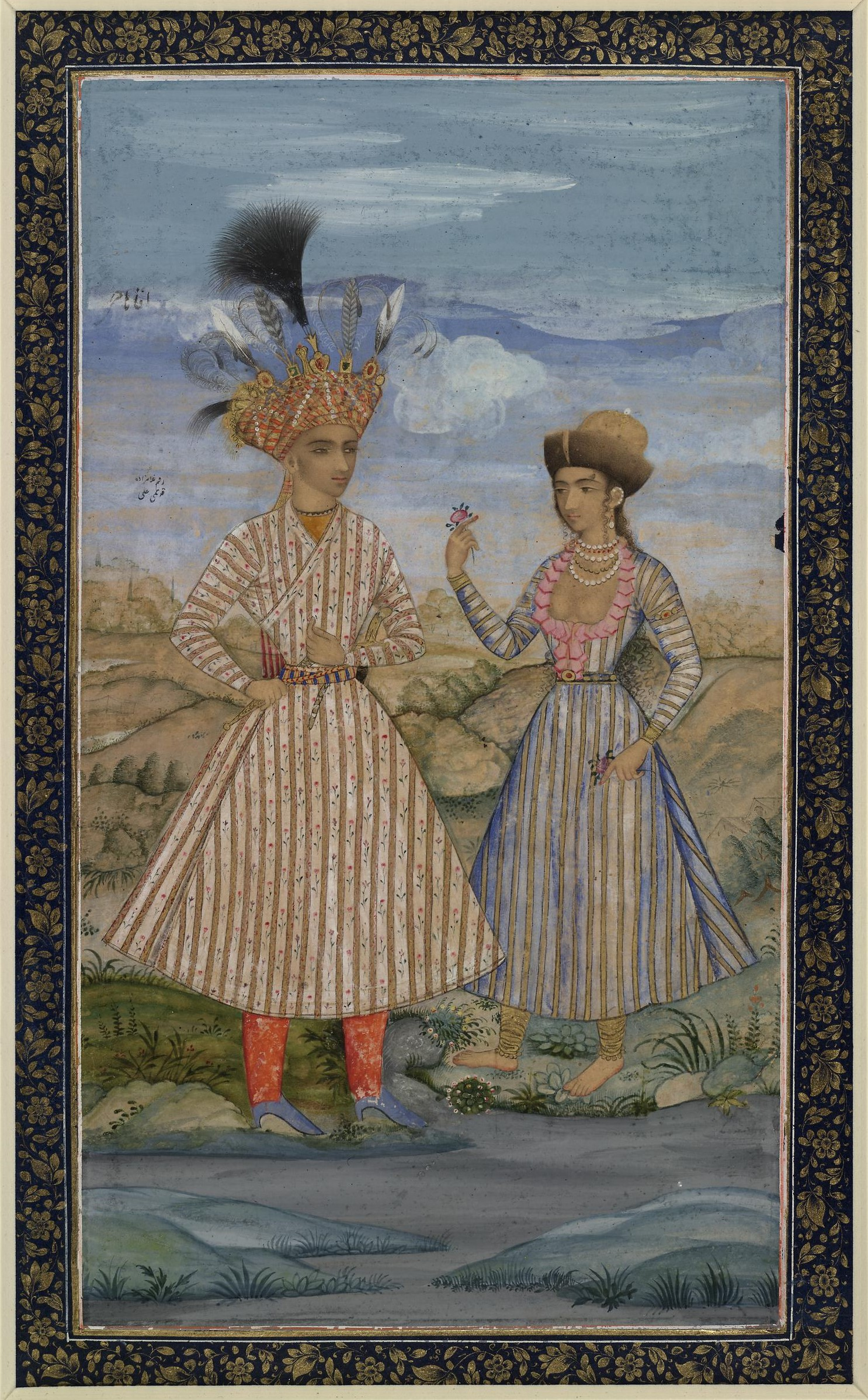
"A lady offering a flower to a prince". Isfahan, ca. 1660-1670. British Museum

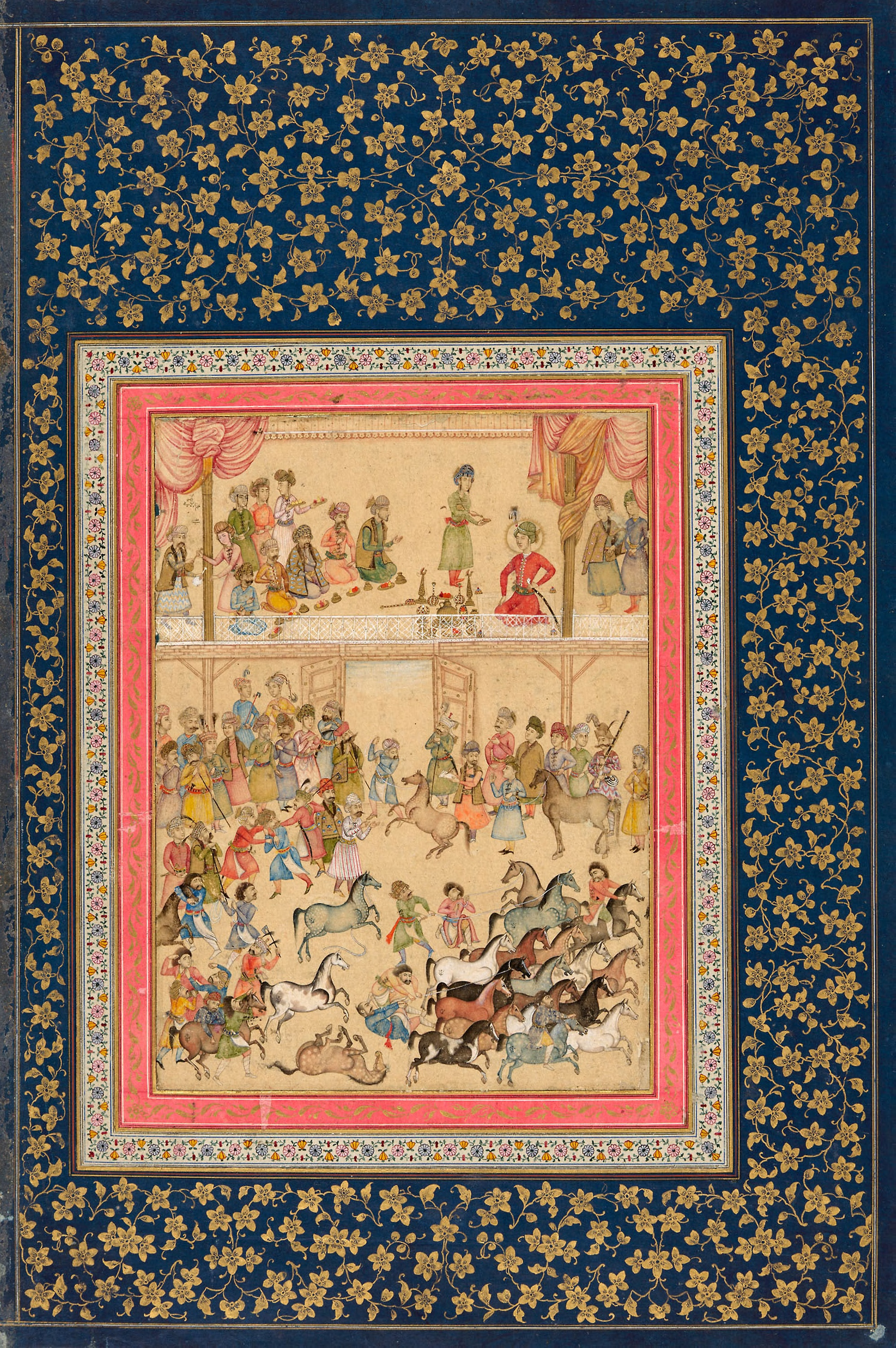
"Horse inspection". Probably Isfahan, late 17th century. Art Institute of Chicago

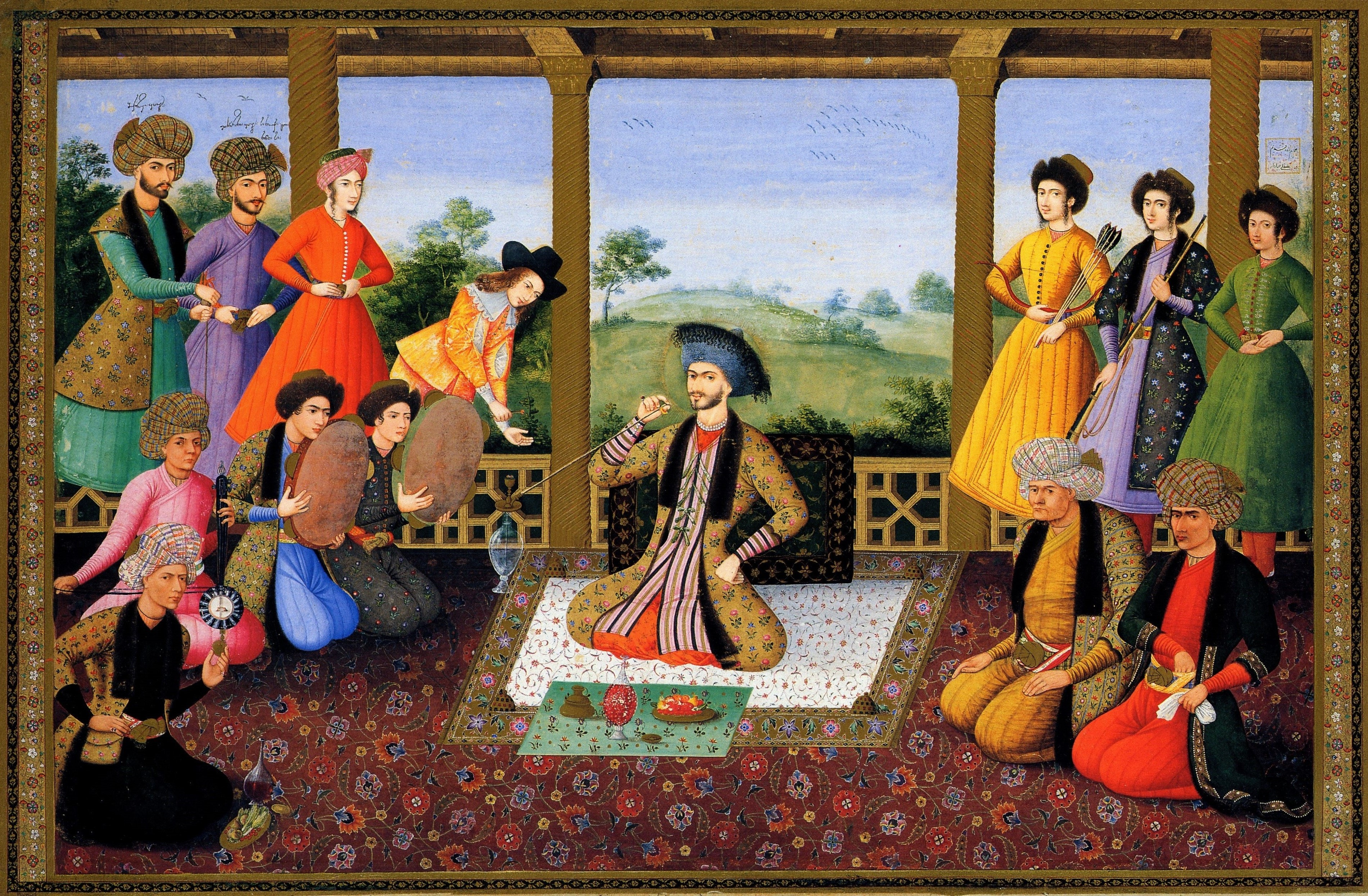
"Shah Suleiman I and his courtiers", Folio from the St. Petersburg Album. Isfahan, 1670. Two greatly distorted Georgian inscriptions are visible above the two figures at the top left. Institute of Oriental Manuscripts of the Russian Academy of Sciences

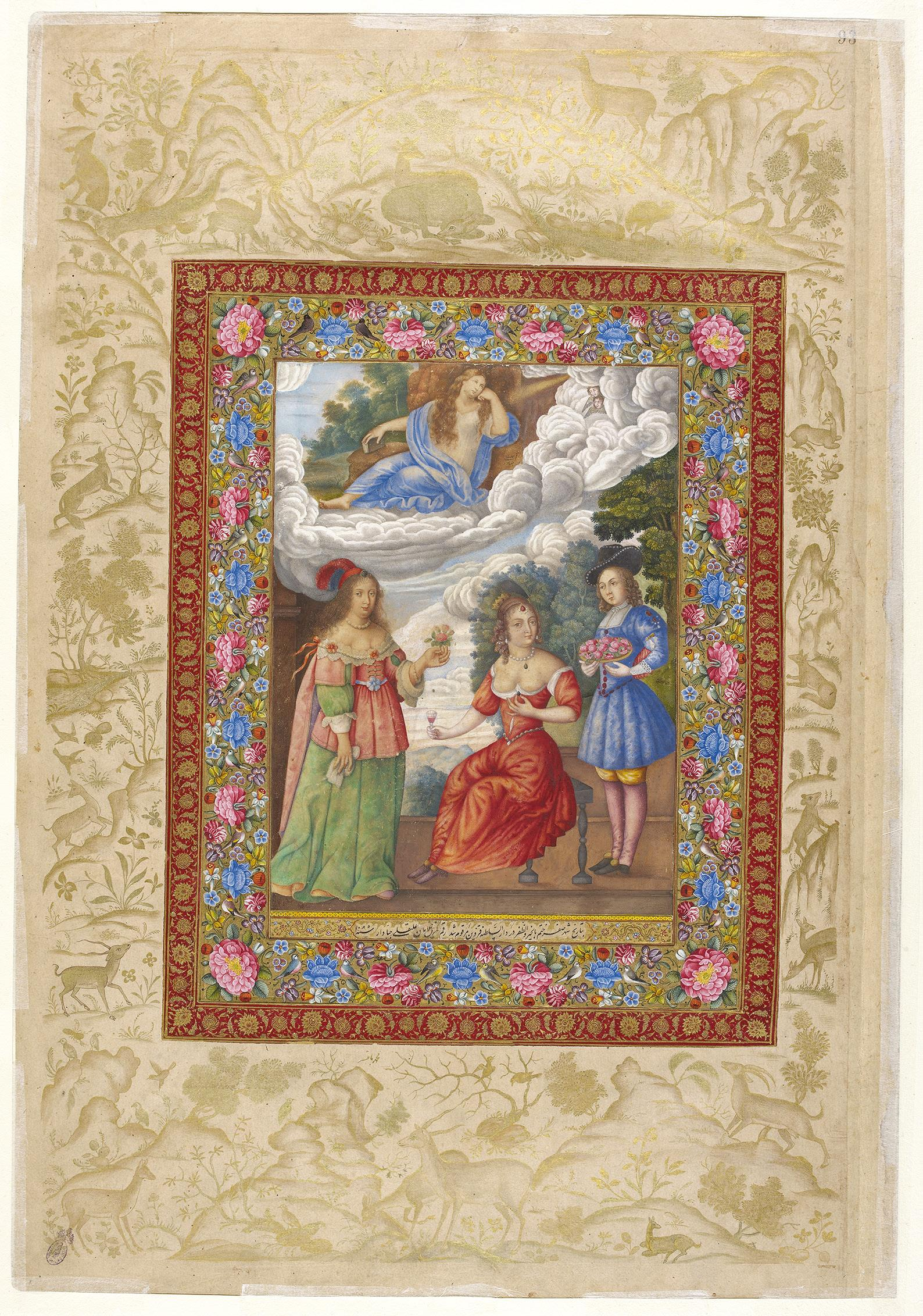
Miniature from the St. Petersburg Album. Allegorical figure, seen floating on a cloud above the three figures below, was executed separately and pasted onto the already painted page when the album was designed. Qazvin, 1674 (Miniature with Two Ladies with a Page). Institute of Oriental Manuscripts of the Russian Academy of Sciences

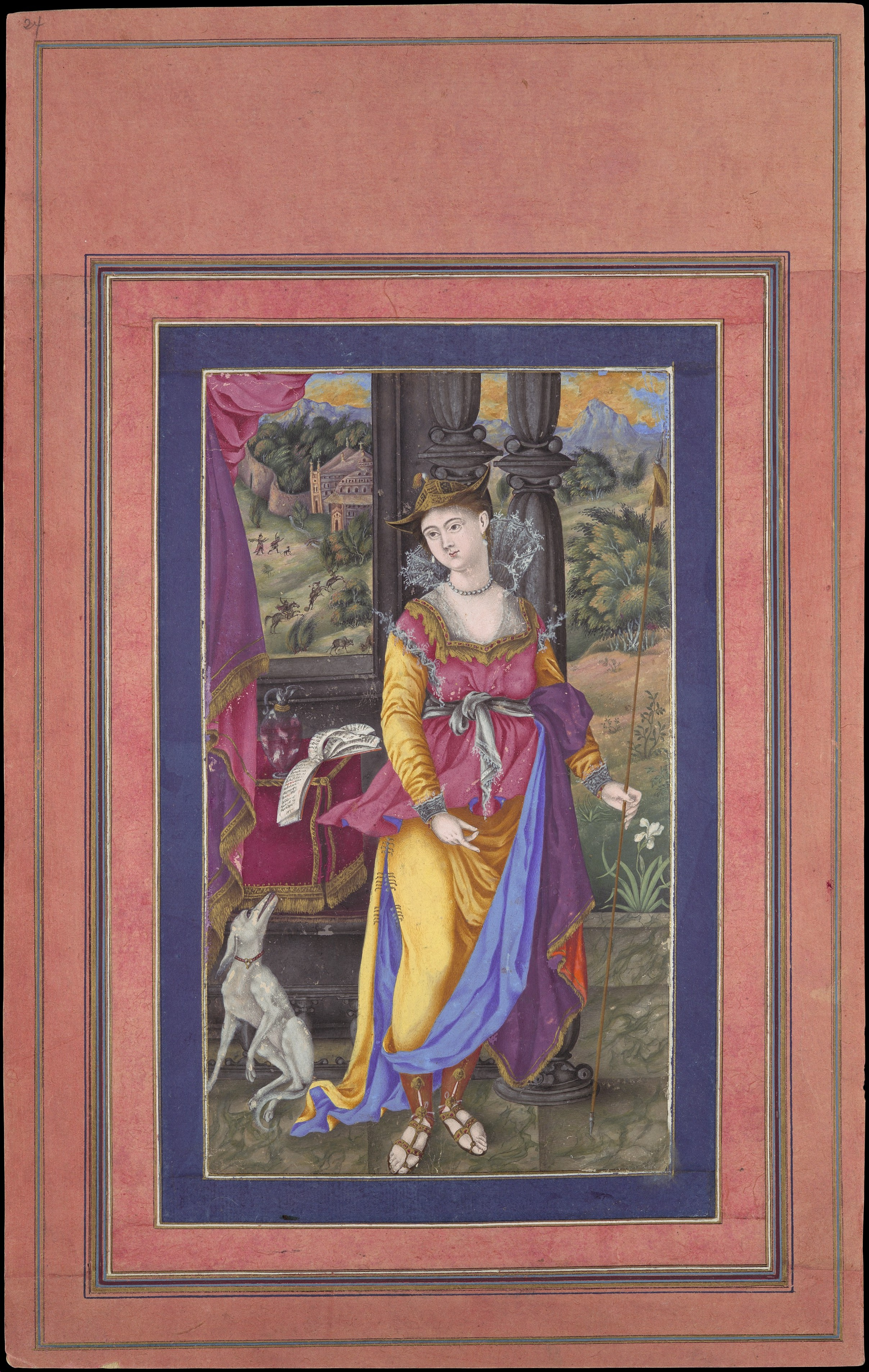
"Diana, Goddess of the Hunt", Folio from the Davis Album. Attributed to Isfahan. Metropolitan Museum of Art

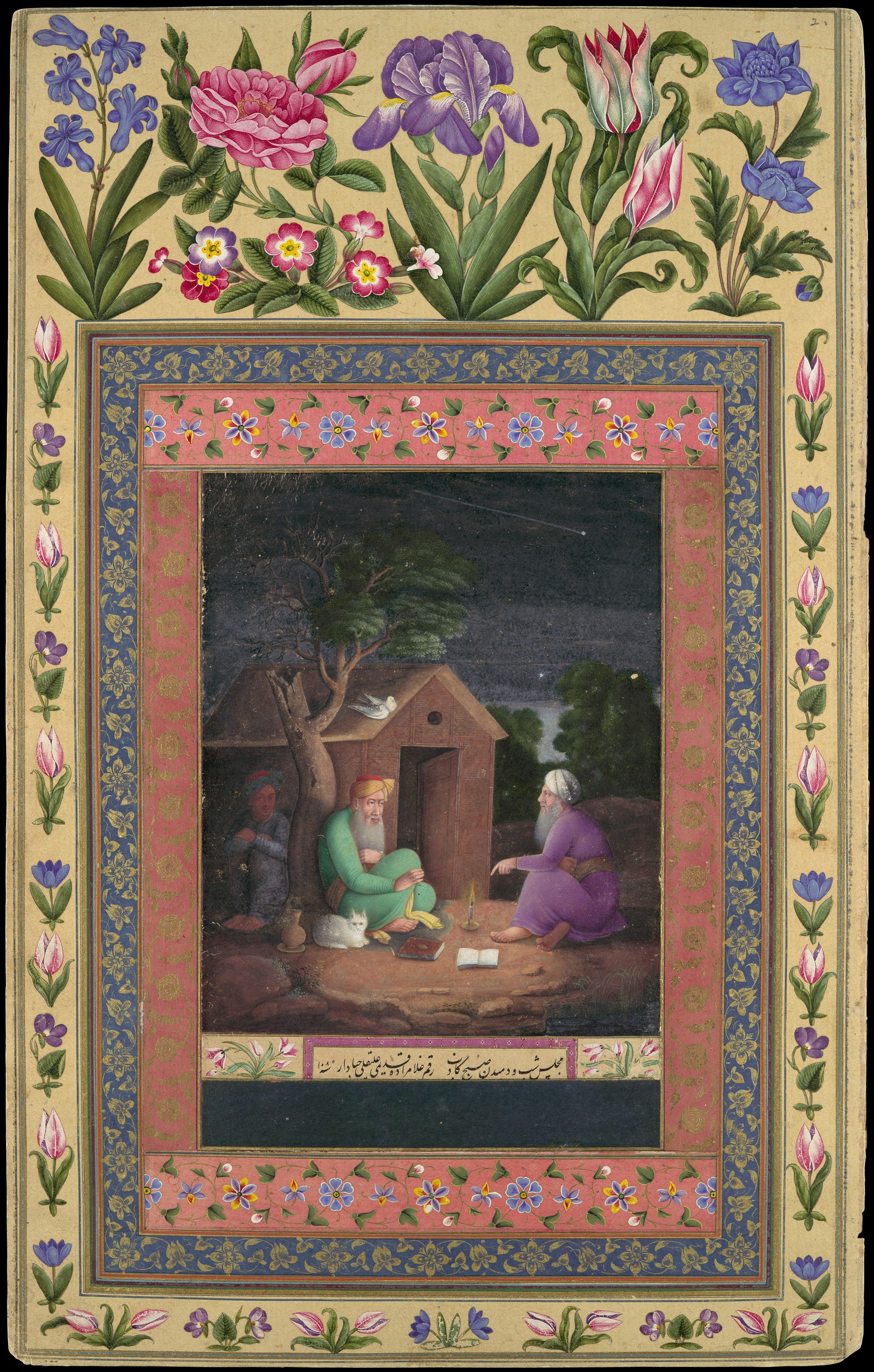
"Two Old Men in Discussion Outside a Hut", Folio from the Davis Album. Iran, 1674-1675. Metropolitan Museum of Art

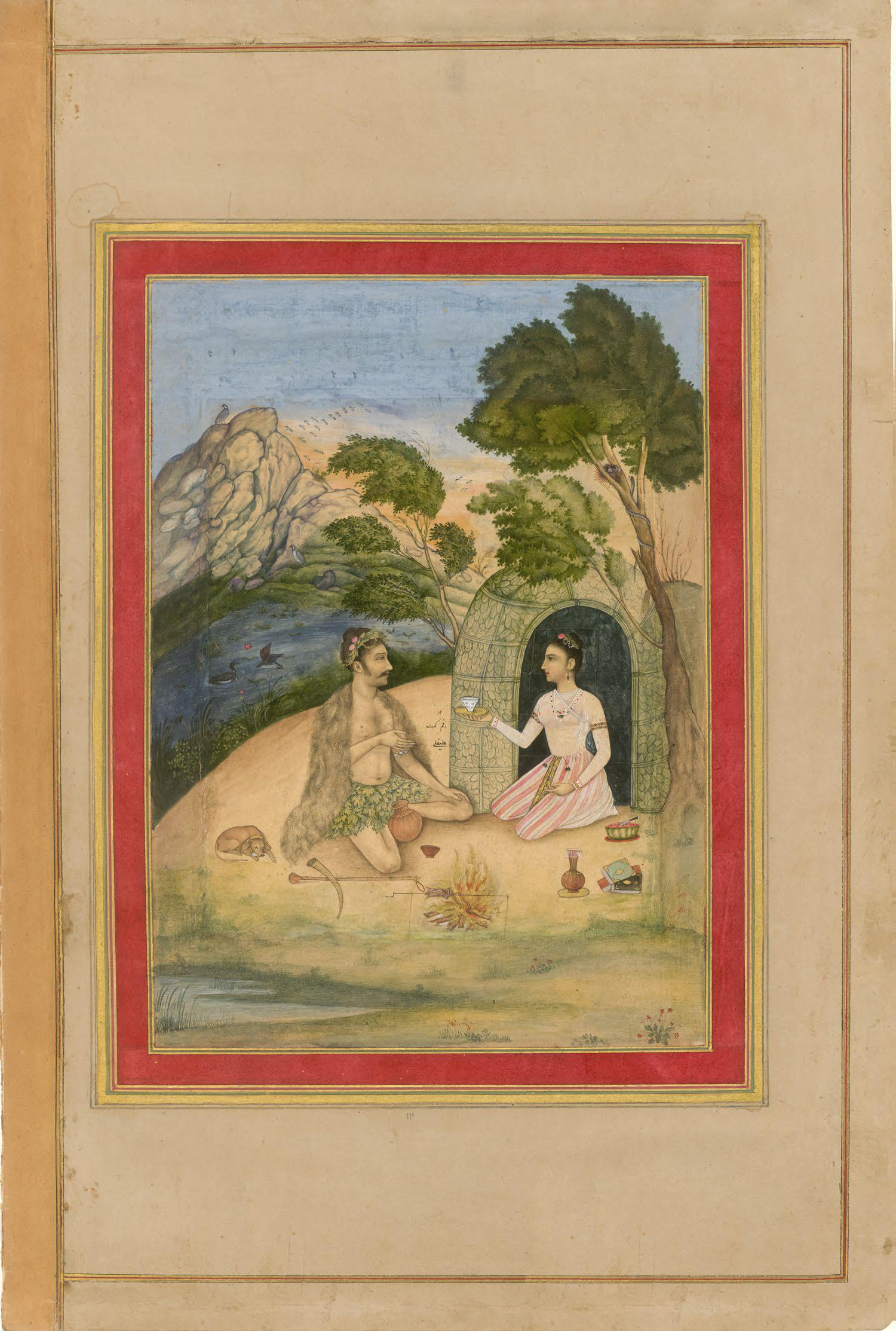
"Lady Offering Refreshments to a Tribesman" (attribution). Museum of Islamic Art, Doha
