= Nakihat Khanum =

First wife of Safavid Shah Abbas II

Queen mother of Safavid Iran
- Tenure: 1666–1680
- Predecessor: Anna Khanum
- Successor: Madar-e Shah (mother of Sultan Huseyn)
- Died: 1680
- Spouse: Abbas II of Persia
- Issue: Suleiman I Safavid
- House: Safavid (by marriage)
- Religion: Shia Islam

Nakihat Khanum (Persian: نکهت خانم ; died 1680) was the first consort of the Safavid king (shah) Abbas II of Iran (r. 1642–1666)."Safī Mirza, who later took the name Shah Suleiman, was under his mother's influence for about twenty years, as long as she was alive.She was one of the most powerful and influential queen mothers of the Safavid era.

She was of Circassian origin and came, probably as a victim of the Crimean slave trade, to the Safavid Imperial harem, where she became the concubine to Abbas II. She became the mother of Abbas II's successor, shah Suleiman I (r. 1666–1694).

Alike other females of the royal court, Nakihat bequeathed property to the Shia shrines in Iraq, which were "formally" under Ottoman control since the Treaty of Zuhab (1639).

== Queen consort ==
Nakht Khanum was of Circassian origin and a temporary wife (euphemism for concubine) of Shah Abbas II. When the Shah was only 16 years old, he consummated his relationship with her, and in February 1646, she gave birth to Sam Mirza. Nakht's beauty and extraordinary qualities had so completely captivated the Shah that she rose to the rank of the foremost lady of the royal harem.

She had a bad relationship with Nur al-Nesa Khanum, the mother of Hamzeh Mirza, and held her responsible for her son's removal from the line of succession.

Any attempt by Shah Abbas II to control power and thwart the intrigues of his wives, Naghat Khanum the Circassian and Nur al-Nesa Khanum the Georgian, against each other, and even to prevent their interference in governmental affairs, proved completely ineffective.

== Queen mother ==
When Abbas II passed away, the nobles of the country decided to place his youngest son, Hamzeh Mirza, on the throne. However, they faced opposition from the khwaja who was responsible for the prince's upbringing, and ultimately they voted for Sam Mirza to become king. When the news of the shah's death was delivered to Naghat Khanum and the request to bring Sam Mirza was made, she opposed the khwajas, fearing that they intended to kill the prince. In the end, however, through the mediation of some of the women of the harem, she consented to have her son taken.

The mother of Shah Suleiman can be regarded as the most powerful Queen Mother of the Safavid era. This was partly due to the special circumstances during Shah Suleiman's reign, such as the establishment of the Harem Council and the Queen Mother's participation in it, and partly due to her own charismatic personality. Her skill and competence became evident from the very beginning of her son's reign. Shah Suleiman, having grown up in the seclusion of the harem, knew little of the art of governance, and thus the Queen Mother quickly took control over him and managed state affairs from within the harem. The French traveler Jean Chardin wrote that Shah Suleiman had boundless respect for his mother and considered her intervention in governance appropriate. The rise to power of the Grand Vizier also demonstrates that, despite efforts to limit women's influence in politics, elite Safavid women still held significant and recognized positions in society.

When the country fell into crisis due to drought and natural disasters, compounded by the incompetence of the shah and his illness, the treasury ran empty. Shah Suleiman's mother, whom Chardin described as more fit to rule than her son, stepped in and took control of financial affairs, preventing her son's excessive and wasteful expenditures.

In addition to overseeing financial affairs, she also intervened in the appointment and dismissal of governors and officials in the provinces. For instance, her support for Hatam Beg in Kerman ensured that he retained the position of minister there for a full twenty-five years, despite the incompetence of Jazini, the previous minister. Beyond these powers, the custody of the shah's Great Seal, which was kept in the harem under the care of the khwajas, was also entrusted to Shah Suleiman's mother during this period.

Shah Suleiman's mother possessed an extraordinary influence over her son. At times, she used this power to restrain the shah's temper and uncontrolled desires. For example, when Shah Suleiman accidentally caused the death of one of his favorite wives during a walk and briefly descended into madness, attacking those around him with a dagger, it was only his mother who, with a single cry of anger, was able to restore him to his normal state.

Shah Suleiman's mother was one of the few women for whom a part of the city would be cordoned off, a testament to the peak of her authority. Chardin recounts one such occasion: 'One day, the Queen Mother wished to see the valuable objects that had been collected over time in the fortress of the city by former and recent kings—whether purchased or received as gifts from other monarchs. On this occasion, a part of the city was cordoned off for her, something that had never happened before.

During this period, Agha Mubarak was in charge of the Queen Mother's finances, and among his duties was overseeing the financial affairs of Julfa, which had been considered the Queen Mother's estate since the reign of Shah Safi. For this reason, the Queen Mother regarded herself as the patron of the Armenians of Julfa. Indeed, during Shah Suleiman's reign, when Ali Qoli Khan, the commander-in-chief, attempted to impose additional taxes on them, the people of Julfa submitted their complaint to the Queen Mother through Agha Mubarak, seeking her intervention.

In addition to the khwajas of the harem, the Queen Mother maintained connections with the court nobles, as she acted as the intermediary in arranging marriages between the harem's daughters and prominent figures of the court. According to Chardin, she held secret conversations, and the nobles sought, through these connections, to secure the Queen Mother's favor and attention

== Sources ==
- Bierbrier, Morris (1998). "The Descendants of Theodora Comnena of Trebizond". The Genealogist. 12 (1).
- Matthee, Rudi (2012). Persia in Crisis: Safavid Decline and the Fall of Isfahan. I.B.Tauris. ISBN 978-1845117450.
- Matthee, Rudi (2015). "SOLAYMĀN I". Encyclopaedia Iranica.
- Newman, Andrew J. (2008). Safavid Iran: Rebirth of a Persian Empire. I.B.Tauris. ISBN 978-0857716613.
