= Amir Beg Armani =

Amir Beg Armani was a 17th-century Safavid official, courtier, and gholam of Armenian origin. He served during the reign of the kings Safi (r. 1629–1642) and Abbas II (r. 1642–1666), and functioned as the royal sommelier (shirehchi-bashi) for several years, as well as governor (hakem) of Gaskar (1633-1643).

Amir Beg Armani was given the governorship of Gaskar after his predecessor, Manuchehr Khan, became a victim of king Safi's purges, who had just recently ascended the throne. He had a son named Safiqoli, who succeeded him as the shirehchi-bashi.

== Sources ==
- Baghdiantz-McCabe, Ina (2008). "Caucasian Elites and Modern State-Building in Safavid Iran". In Chaudhury, Shushil; Kévonian, Kéram (eds.). Les Arméniens dans le commerce asiatique au début de l'ère moderne. Maison des Sciences de l'Homme. p. 99. ISBN 978-2735112043.
- Floor, Willem M. (2008). Titles and Emoluments in Safavid Iran: A Third Manual of Safavid Administration, by Mirza Naqi Nasiri. Washington, DC: Mage Publishers. p. 188. ISBN 978-1933823232.
- Matthee, Rudolph P. (1999). The Politics of Trade in Safavid Iran: Silk for Silver, 1600-1730. Cambridge: Cambridge University Press. p. 120. ISBN 978-0521641319.
- Matthee, Rudolph P. (2005). The Pursuit of Pleasure: Drugs and Stimulants in Iranian History, 1500-1900. Princeton University Press. p. 57. ISBN 978-0691118550.
- Matthee, Rudi (2012). Persia in Crisis: Safavid Decline and the Fall of Isfahan. I.B.Tauris. pp. 43, 258. ISBN 978-1845117450.

Preceded by Manuchehr Khan	Governor of Gaskar; 1633–1643	Succeeded by Barbideh Beg
