= Dilaram Khanum =

Safavid princess and mother of Shah Safi (died c.1647)

Dilaram Khanum دلارام خانم

Queen mother of Safavid Iran
- Tenure: 1629–1642
- Predecessor: Sultanum Begum
- Successor: Anna Khanum
- Died: c. 1647; Safavid Iran
- Burial: Imam Reza Shrine
- Spouse: Mohammad Baqer Mirza (died 1614)
- Issue: Safi Mirza
- Dynasty: Safavid

Dilaram Khanum (Persian: دلارام خانم, also spelled Del Aram or Delaram; died c. 1647) was a Georgian concubine of Safavid Crown Prince Mohammad Baqer Mirza, and the mother of Shah Safi (r. 1629–1642).

== Life ==
Dilaram Khanum was of Georgian origin and came to the Safavid Imperial harem as a slave concubine to Mohammad Baqer Mirza.

In 1632, a court intrigue came to light that involved opposition to Safi's rule originating in the shah's harem. Subsequently, the shah ordered the massacre of forty women of the harem as well as the blinding and killing of almost all the sons of the daughters of Abbas I (r. 1588–1629). Prior to the 1632 event, one of Abbas I's aunts, Zeynab Begum, was the leading female in the harem.

After the event, Dilaram became the most influential matriarch. When Dilaram's son Safi died in 1647, he was succeeded by her grandson, who was known by his regnal name of Abbas II (r. 1642–1666). In the early years of Abbas II's reign, when he was still young, grand vizier Saru Taqi functioned as his regent, with Dilaram's strong support.

== Sponsorings ==
Dilaram Khanum sponsored the construction of two schools, in 1645/6 and 1647/8 respectively. The "Jaddeh caravanserai" (Jaddeh means grandmother) in Isfahan, constructed during the vizierate of Saru Taqi and being one of the largest in the city, referred to Dilaram Khanum, the grandmother of Shah Abbas II. In total, there are two caravanserais in Isfahan that are attributed to Dilaram Khanum's sponsoring.

== Sources ==
- Babaie, Sussan; Babayan, Kathryn; Baghdiantz-McCabe, Ina; Farhad, Massumeh (2004). Slaves of the Shah: New Elites of Safavid Iran. I.B.Tauris. ISBN 978-0857716866.
- Bierbrier, Morris (1997). "The Descendants of Theodora Comnena of Trebizond". The Genealogist. 11 (2).
- Blow, David (2009). Shah Abbas: The Ruthless King Who became an Iranian Legend. London, UK: I. B. Tauris & Co. Ltd. p. 20. ISBN 978-1845119898. LCCN 2009464064.
- Newman, Andrew J. (2008). Safavid Iran: Rebirth of a Persian Empire. I.B.Tauris. p. 186. ISBN 978-0857716613.
