= Suleiman I of Persia =

Shah of Persia from 1666 to 1694

Suleiman I
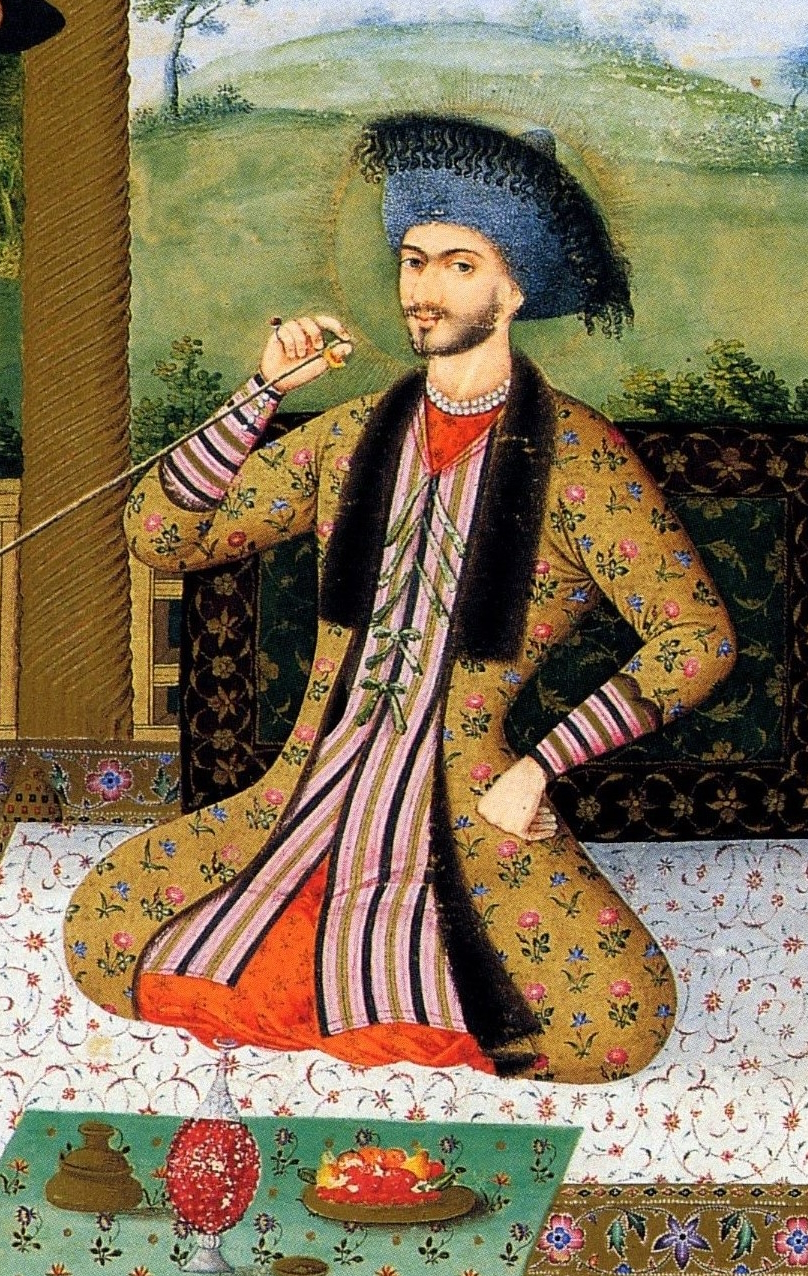
- Suleiman I, painted by Aliquli Jabbadar in 1670.

Shah of Iran
- Reign: 1 November 1666 – 29 July 1694
- Coronation: First coronation: 1 November 1666; Second coronation: March 1668
- Predecessor: Abbas II
- Successor: Soltan Hoseyn
- Born: Sam Mirza; February/March 1648
- Died: 29 July 1694 (aged 46); Isfahan, Iran
- Burial: Fatima Masumeh Shrine, Qom, Iran
- Issue: Soltan Hoseyn; Zobeydeh Khanum; Shahrbanu Begum; Sultan Morteza Mirza
- Dynasty: Safavid
- Father: Abbas II
- Mother: Nakihat Khanum
- Religion: Twelver Shia Islam

Suleiman I (Persian: شاه سلیمان, romanized: Shah Solayman; born Sam Mirza, February or March 1648 – 29 July 1694) was the eighth Shah of Safavid Iran from 1666 to 1694. He was the eldest son of Abbas II and his concubine, Nakihat Khanum. Born as Sam Mirza, Suleiman spent his childhood in the harem among women and eunuchs and his existence was hidden from the public. In 1666, after the death of his father, the nineteen-year-old Sam Mirza was crowned king under the regnal name, Safi II, after his grandfather, Safi I. He had a troublesome reign as Safi II, which convinced his court astrologers that he should undergo a coronation once again. Thus, in 20 March 1668, simultaneously with Nowruz, he was crowned king with a new name, Suleiman I.

After his second coronation, Suleiman retreated into his harem to enjoy sexual activities and excessive drinking. He was indifferent to the state affairs, and often would not appear in the public for months. Suleiman's reign was devoid of spectacular events in the form of major wars and rebellions. For this reason, Western contemporary historians regard Suleiman's reign as "remarkable for nothing" while the Safavid court chronicles refrained from recording his tenure. Suleiman's reign saw the decline of the Safavid army, to the point when the soldiers became undisciplined and made no effort to serve as it was required of them. At the same time, the eastern borders of the realm were under the constant raids from the Uzbeks, and the Kalmyks.

On 29 July 1694, Suleiman died from a combination of gout and his chronic alcoholism. Often seen as a failure in kingship, Suleiman's reign was the starting point of the Safavid ultimate decline: weakened military power, falling agricultural output and the corrupt bureaucracy, all were a forewarning of the troubling rule of his successor, Soltan Hoseyn, whose reign saw the end of the Safavid dynasty. Suleiman was the first Safavid Shah that did not patrol his kingdom and never led an army, thus giving away the government affairs to the influential court eunuchs, harem women and the Shi‘i high clergy. Perhaps the only admiring aspect of his reign was the appreciation of art, for the Farangi-Sazi, or the Western painting style, saw its establishment under Suleiman's sponsorship.

== Background ==
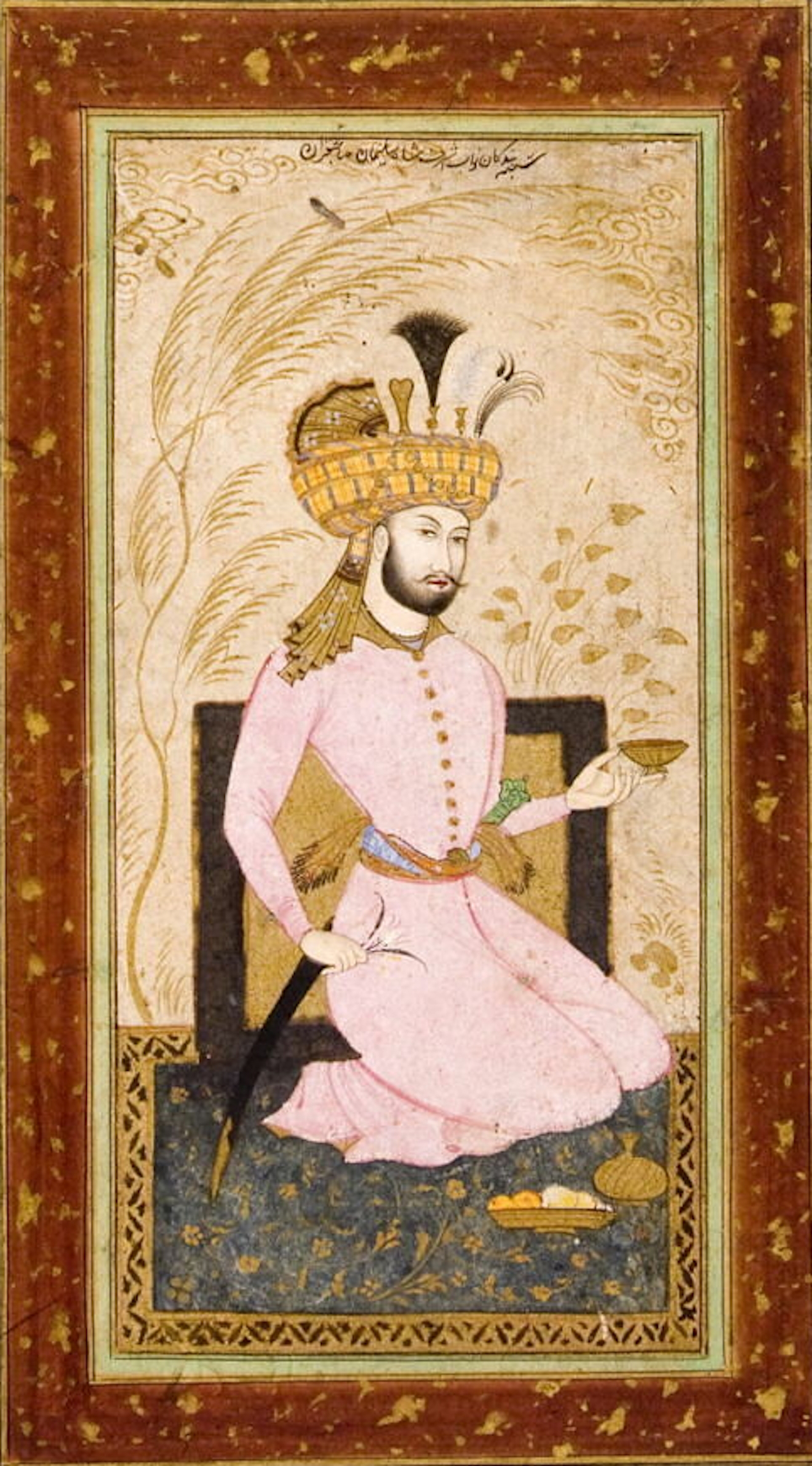
A contemporary portrait of a young Shah Suleiman I. Isfahan, circa 1660-1680. Louvre Museum.

Suleiman's father, Abbas II, was the seventh Shah of Safavid Iran. In 1649, Abbas led an army to retake Kandahar, a bone of contention between the Safavid and the Mughal Empire originating back to Tahmasp I's reign. The war, though successful, was one of the reasons for an economic decline later in his reign which plagued the Safavid Empire until its dissolution. After the war for Kandahar, the Safavid army during Abbas' reign undertook two further military campaigns in the Caucasus: one in 1651 to destroy the Russian fortress on the Iranian side of the Terek River (which the Safavids considered as part of their realm), and one in 1659 to suppress the Georgian rebellion. The rest of Abbas' reign lacked any further rebellions and was relatively peaceful. A consequence of this peace was the decline of the army, which started during his reign and saw its peak in the reign of his successors.

Abbas' relations with the Uzbeks were peaceful. He made arrangements with Uzbeks of Bukhara under which they agreed to stop raiding into Iranian territory. Relations with the Ottoman Empire were likewise peaceful, despite tensions during Abbas' reign in Transcaucasia, where the risk of war was so acute that the governor of the Turkish border provinces had evacuated the civilian population in expectation of an Iranian attack, and in Basra, where the shah's aid had been sought to settle a struggle for the succession.

The Farangi-sazi style blossomed under Abbas' patronage who supported two prominent painters of this style, Mohammad Zaman and Aliquli Jabbadar. He was a tolerant monarch. He frequently attended Armenian church services and ceremonies, and gave permission for the Jesuits to establish a mission in Isfahan in 1653. Although at various times between 1645 and 1654, the Safavid authorities forced the Iranian Jews to convert to Islam, there is no evidence to support that Abbas himself set them in motion.

== Early life ==
Sam Mirza was born in February or March 1648 as the eldest son of Abbas II and his concubine, Nakihat Khanum. He grew up in the royal Safavid harem under the guardianship of a black eunuch named Agha Nazer. According to Jean Chardin, the French traveler, Sam Mirza was known for his arrogance. His first language was Azeri Turkish, and it is unclear to what degree he was able to understand Persian. Reportedly, Abbas II was not on good terms with Sam Mirza — it was rumoured that the shah had blinded the young prince — and favoured Sam Mirza's younger brother, Hamza Mirza, the son of a Circassian concubine.

At the end of 1662, Abbas II showed the first symptoms of syphilis. On 26 October 1666, while in his winter residence at Behshahr, he died of a combination of syphilis and throat cancer as a result of his excessive drinking at the age of thirty-four. It was said that on his deathbed, Abbas II foretold the fate of his successor to be one of perpetual turmoil and disaster.

== Reign as Safi II ==
=== First Coronation ===
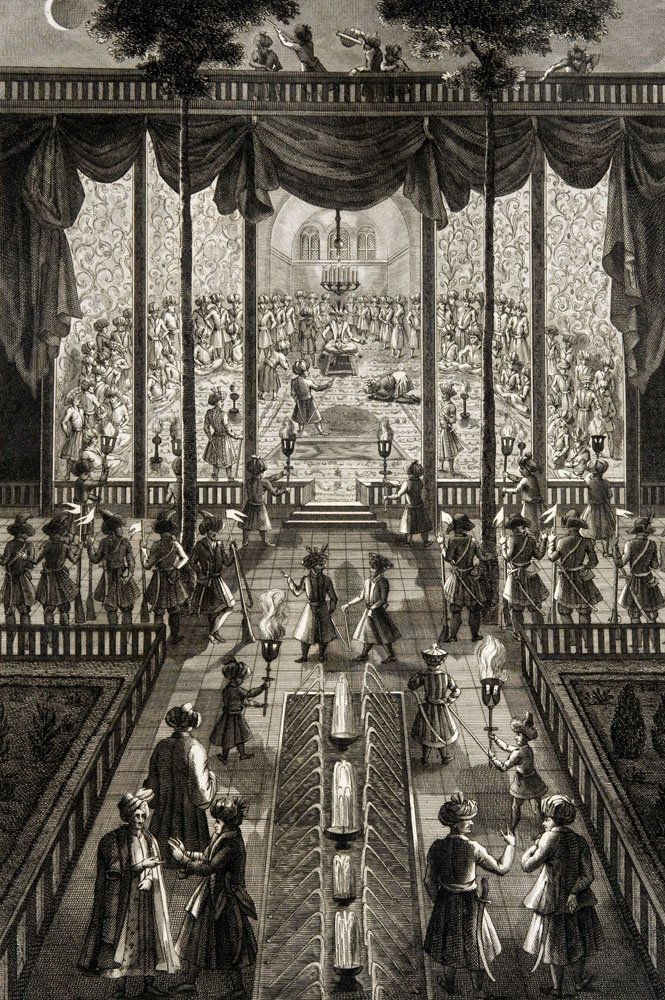
The coronation of Safi II, engraved by Engelbert Kaempfer, Isfahan, 1 November 1666

In the hours after the death of Abbas II, the yuzbashi (Note: The commander of the young gholam units.) Sulaman Aqa called for a meeting between the notables presented in the shah's camp. Behind the close doors, he told them that the shah was dead and that they should choose his heir before leaving for the capital, Isfahan. The shah's grand vizier, Mirza Mohammad Karaki, responded with "What do I know?" and "I have no knowledge of what goes on in the interior of the palace." when asked about the shah's offspring. It was the eunuchs of the inner palace that informed the notables of the existence of two sons, the nineteen-year-old Sam Mirza, and Hamza Mirza, who was only seven-years-old.

The eunuchs, who were eager to have a pliable child on the throne and believed the rumour about Sam Mirza's blindness, announced their support for Hamza Mirza. The grand vizier also declared his support for Hamza Mirza's claim. At this point, Agha Mubarak, Hamza's lala (guardian), made an argument in favour of Sam Mirza, against his own interests and those of his eunuch colleagues. He accused the eunuchs of opting for Hamza Mirza for selfish reasons. He pointed out that Sam Mirza was not blinded by the orders of his father and argued that he was more worthier than a mere child. And at last, Agha Mubarak's argument prevailed.

The Tofangchi-aghasi, (Note: The commander of the Safavid army's musketeer corps.) Khosrow Soltan Armani, by reputation the least trustworthy among the eunuchs, was chosen to go to Isfahan to announce the new heir before word of the death of Abbas II could spread. Sam Mirza, who had been surrounded by women and eunuchs all his life and had not seen the world outside of the harem, was then brought out of the inner palace, dazzled and unsure what to do with the responsibility thrust upon him. He was seized with panic when asked to appear before the throne room for the coronation, and reluctantly accepted the invitation because he assumed that he was being lured there simply to be murdered or blinded.

On 1 November 1666, six days after Abbas II's death, Sam Mirza was crowned king under the name Safi II, after his grandfather, Safi I, at one o’clock in the afternoon in a ceremony persisted by Mohammad Bagher Sabzevari, the shaykh al-Islam of Isfahan. The new king received the heads of killed Uzbeks and rewarded the slayers with money. He also allotted money to 300 Turkish refugees from the Ottoman Empire, who had sought shelter in Isfahan. As a sign of smooth transition of power, Isfahan remained peaceful: the shops remained open and started doing their business with the new coins of Safi II, and everyday life remained unchanged. Foreign residents, who had locked their houses in fear of uprisings and looting, again emerged into the city.

=== Turmoil and disasters ===
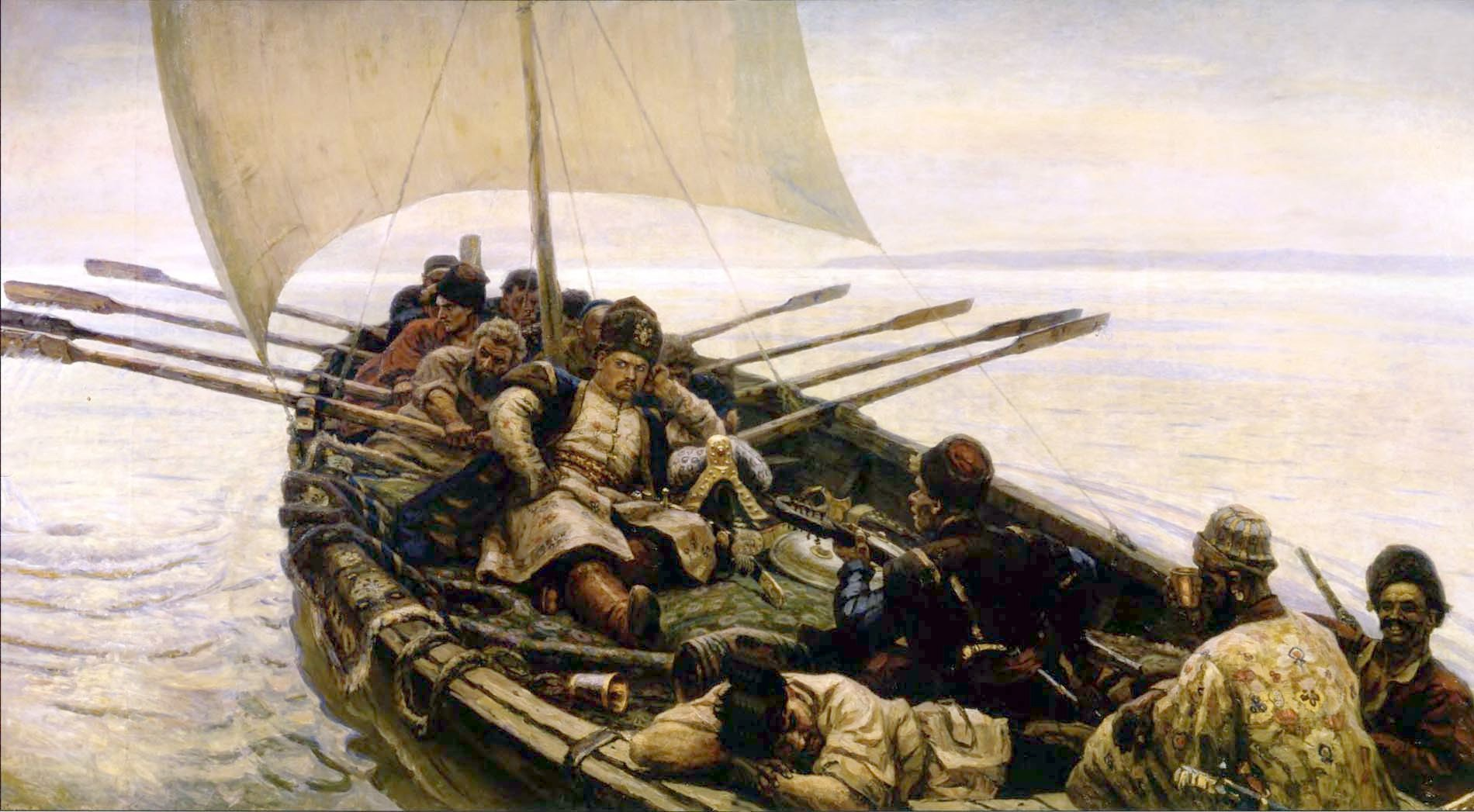
Stepan Razin Sailing in the Caspian Sea by Vasily Surikov, 1906. The Russian rebel, Stenka Razin, led numerous raids on the Northern provinces of Iran during 1667.

Soon after his coronation, Safi faced problems. Two barren harvests left the central parts of the realm under famine and an earthquake in November 1667 in Shirvan led to the death of more than 30,000 in the villages and around 20,000 in its capital city, Shamakhi. In the following year, the Northern provinces of the realm endured raids by Stenka Razin's Cossacks, whom the Safavid army was unable to subdue. The Cossacks had raided these provinces before, in 1664, when they were defeated by local forces. Now, under the leadership of Razin, they ransacked Mazandaran and attacked Daghestan. Razin went to Isfahan to ask Safi for land in his realm in exchange for loyalty to the shah, but departed to the Caspian Sea for more pillaging before they could reach an agreement. The tsar of Russia, Alexis, sent a delegation to Isfahan in order to apologise for the damages done and later in 1671, hanged Razin as a rebel.

Meanwhile, there were internal problems. Safi caught an unspecified illness, which by August 1667, had convinced everyone that he might die, causing the grandees of the court to arrange a public prayer for his well-being while giving out 1,000 tomans to the poor. The shah squandered his government’s resources as part of endowments to the poor. As a result of his naive belief that the royal coffers could never end, the treasury became empty and the money, already scarce in Isfahan, became even scarcer.

=== Second Coronation ===
During Safi's time of illness, a physician who was trying to cure the shah suggested that his misfortune must have come from a miscalculation in determining the date of the coronation. Soon, a court astrologer confirmed this assumption, and the court, the queen mother, Nakihat Khanum, and the leading eunuchs, with the consent of the shah, concluded that the coronation should be repeated and Safi should be crowned king under a new name. Thus, in March 1668, at nine o'clock in the morning, simultaneously with Nowruz, a second coronation for the shah was held in the Chehel Sotoun Palace. The ceremony was preceded by an unorthodox ritual. As told by Jean-Baptiste Tavernier, who witnessed it, a Zoroastrian, "descended from the old kings", was put on the Shah's throne with his back tied to a wooden statue. The attendants paid their respects to him until an hour before sunset, the time for the real coronation. At that point an official came up from behind and cut off the head of the statue, whereupon the Zoroastrian fled and Safi II appeared. The Safavid bonnet was next put on his head, and he was girded with a sword, and Safi II took on the name Abu'l-Muzzafar Abu'l-Mansur Shah Suleiman Safavi Mousavi Bahador Khan, with the name Suleiman referring to King Solomon.

After the coronation, new royal seals and coins were made under the name Suleiman I and within twenty-four hours a large quantity of new money was struck. At the same time, a comet appeared in the sky, which was taken as a sign of the event's auspiciousness.

== Reign as Suleiman I ==
=== Royal isolation ===
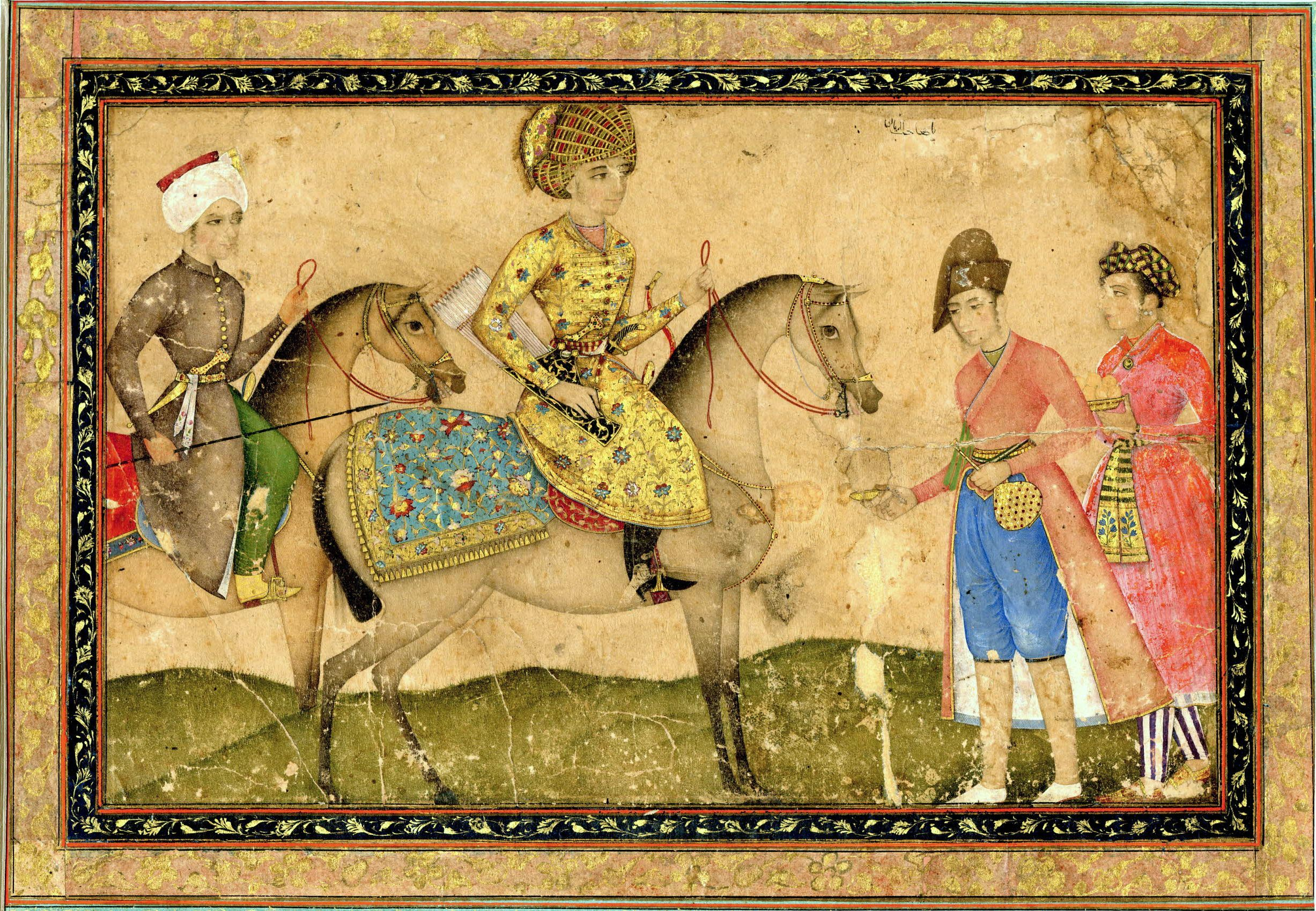
Suleiman I, and three of his attendants, during one of his quruqs. Painting by Mohammad Zaman, circa. 1670-85

It was soon proven that a repeated coronation and a new name was not a step closer to the improvement of the state. Suleiman, after his coronation, retreated into the depths of the harem and began a policy of royal isolation. He would not appear in public and often preferred to stay in Isfahan rather than travel throughout the country. (Note: He only once travelled beyond Isfahan, in March 1674, when he left the city for Qazvin and from there spent some time in the northern cities such as Behshahr and returned to the capital in July 1676.) He only went out of the palace in form of a quruq, meaning he would order the people of a neighbourhood to vacate their district and move away to a different one so that Suleiman and the women of the harem as his entourage, could ride freely in that district. No male older than six was allowed to be in that district when the shah and his companions came riding, if a man was caught, he would be executed. Suleiman, unlike his father, no longer allowed his subjects to enter his palace and petition him. In fact, he would not emerge from the inner palace for periods of up to twelve days, during which he would not accept anyone outside the harem to disturb him. For the first fifteen years of his reign, women were still allowed to accost him during his quruqs: in 1683, this access was formally abolished altogether.

Contemporary observers often considered Suleiman's reign after his second coronation to be devoid of any notable events, and who refrained from recording the period in chronicle form. Mohammad Shafi Tehrani, the Qajar historian, claims that the Uzbek and Kalmyk raids of Astarabad were the only significant events of his reign. Modern historians, however, argue otherwise. It has been suggested that Suleiman may have had greater control over the state than its generally assumed: out of eleven firmans collected in a compendium by Heribert Busse, seven were directly issued by Suleiman, and three of them are of his own wording while four were clearly worded by his grand vizier. Suleiman was self-aware enough to choose a competent grand vizier who would rule in his stead while Suleiman enjoyed his lavish lifestyle. His choice was Shaykh Ali Khan Zanganeh, a statesman who served as his grand vizier for twenty years.

=== Grand Vizierate of Shaykh Ali Khan ===
Shaykh Ali Khan was the Amir of the Zanganeh tribe and succeeded Mirza Mohammad Karaki (who had maintained his position after Suleiman's ascension) as the grand vizier in 1669. Faced with an empty treasury after a series of misfortunes, Shaykh Ali immediately commenced a financial policy that combined cutting expenses with increasing revenue. He sought a stricter observation on the annual silk supply to the VOC, who, using the chaos in the capital, took a greater supply of silk than had initially been agreed upon. Moreover, he attempted to take control of the monopoly of sugar and instituted a five-percent tax on the merchants who shipped sugar to India. Shaykh Ali imposed new taxes on the New Julfa churches and the Armenians who lived in the villages around Isfahan. Through all of his projects, Shaykh Ali showed diligence, and, in contrast to many of his colleagues, refused to accept bribery, and soon became known for his incorruptibility. It is true that few of his projects were completely successful, nevertheless, Shaykh Ali was highly effective in collecting revenue for the royal treasury.

Shaykh Ali Khan's policies made him enemies amongst the courtiers, who disliked his attempts to curb the lavish lifestyle of the court. He also urged Suleiman to follow a path of frugality, which further infuriated his adversaries who were dependent on the shah's generosity. Shaykh Ali's fall from the shah's grace took place in early 1672, when the shah ordered his grand vizier to drink wine: when he refused, Suleiman forced him to drink and spent hours humiliating him. Shaykh Ali Khan was soon arrested, and the realm fell into turmoil. In the same year, one of his sons took refuge with the Ottomans, raising fears of a potential war. Fourteen months after his removal, Suleiman reappointed Shaykh Ali as his grand vizier to quiet the rumours of the war. Having resumed his position, Shaykh Ali started to curb the military outlay and sent tax-collectors to the provinces, demanding taxes and imposing fines for unpaid obligations. Shaykh Ali decided to no longer inform the shah about state affairs, and he started shunning his own responsibilities, handing requests to Suleiman and urging him to ratify them without first reading them. Shaykh Ali still provoked Suleiman's wrath from time to time by refusing drinks from him: the shah's outbursts would always result in humiliation of the grand vizier, but normally, Suleiman would feel remorse for his mockery and would send the grand vizier a robe of honour as a token of appreciation for his efforts.

As the years went by, Suleiman showed less and less desire to partake in the frequent meetings with his grand vizier regarding state affairs. Hence, the grand vizier was left on his own when important decisions were to be made, while Suleiman would discuss the state affairs with his wives and the eunuchs, who were his confidants. His wives and eunuchs thus exercised a dominant influence upon the shah, and guarded their influence and were keen to prevent the shah from communicating with anyone but themselves. Suleiman even set up a privy council in the harem, to which the most important eunuchs belonged. Even when the shah would discuss the state affairs with his grand vizier, it was impossible to discuss them in detail because Suleiman was impatient and resentful of the problems that had risen throughout the realm.

=== The vacant court positions ===
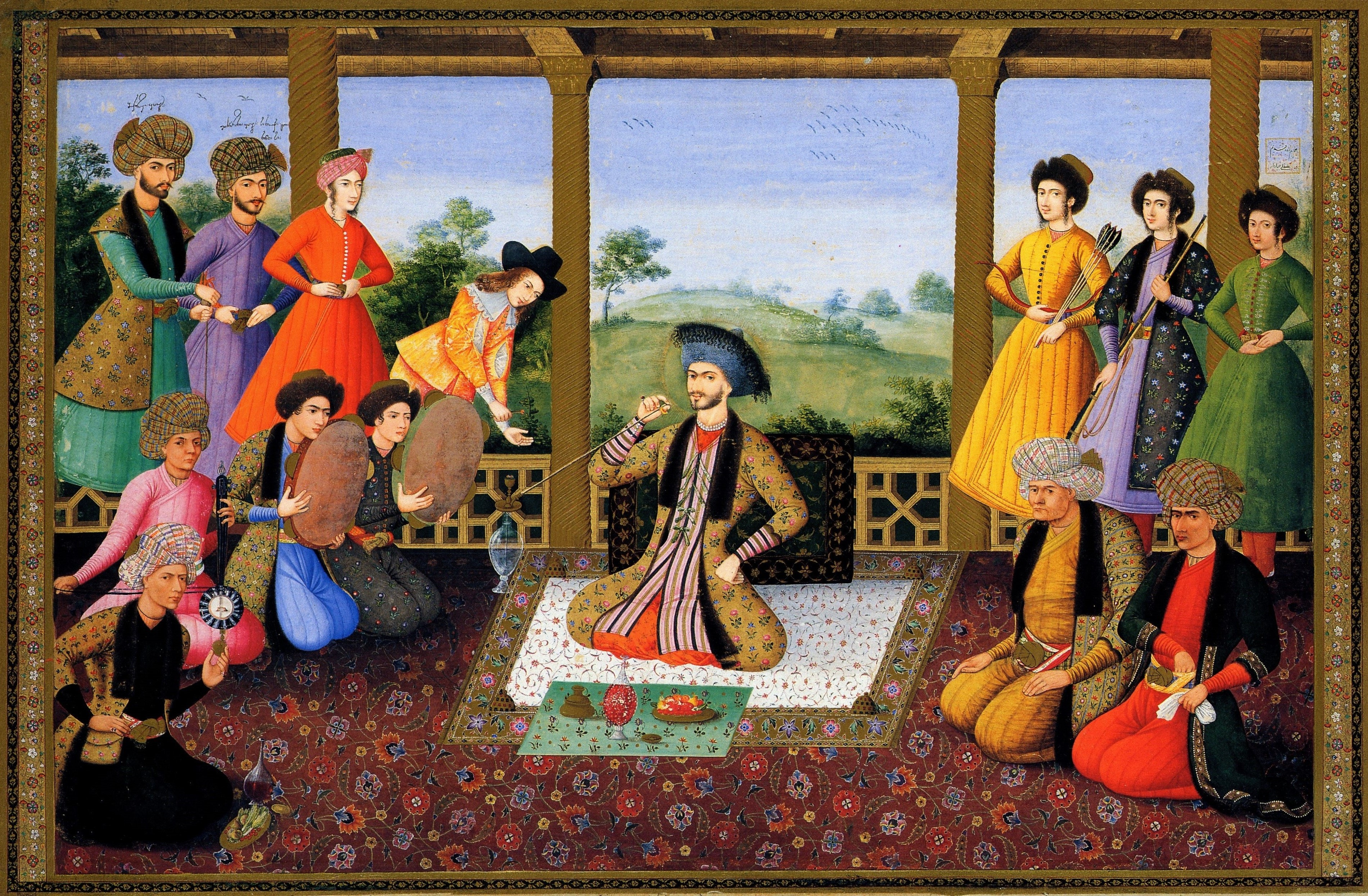
"Shah Suleiman I and his courtiers", Folio from the St. Petersburg Album. Aliquli Jabbadar, Isfahan, 1670.

After Shaykh Ali's reappointment, the shah's court grew intimated and afraid of him. Suleiman showed extreme cruelty towards his courtiers: in 1679, he forced Shaykh Ali to shave his beard (so that he would look like Georgians, whom he despised for their Christianity), and because the beard was not cleanly shaven, he had the barber executed as well; in 1680, he blinded the divan-begi, (Note: The Imperial Chief Justice or the Lord High Justice of the realm.) Zaynal Khan; and, he had Shaykh Ali and one of his royal secretariats bastinadoed; in 1681, he killed one of his sons, who was fourteen years old at the time. The boy had spent his whole life in the harem wearing women’s clothes at the prompting of astrologers, who had seen a prophesy that he would depose Suleiman. Many of the courtiers were so afraid of the shah that they would leave the court with the excuse of undertaking hajj. In early 1681, Shaykh Ali made a request to make a hajj that was rejected for an unknown reason. The shah’s erratic and unpredictable behavior encouraged sycophantic behavior by the courtiers, flattering the shah and hiding unpleasant news from him, while also forsaking their duties and embracing corruption. The army, in general, became undisciplined and its military standards fell, as soldiers came to regard their pay as little more than a gratuity. Some military formations existed only on paper.

Despite his continued insecurity and his limited contact with the shah, Shaykh Ali Khan maintained his position even during 1680s, when most of the court positions were vacant and unfilled. In 1680, the shah took the position of sadr-i mamalik (minister of religion) for himself; the royal secretariat were all dismissed in 1682. In the same year, the position of sepahsalar became vacant after the death of its holder, and remained as much until the end of Suleiman's reign. In addition, the positions of divan-begi, qurchi-bashi, (Note: The head of the qurchis (the loyal bodyguards of the shah).) shaykh al-Islam, and mirshekar-bashi (master of the hunt), all became vacant in the same year. Shaykh Ali Khan died in 1689 while still occupying the grand vizier position. Saddened by his death, Suleiman, who had mistreated his grand vizier for twenty years, did not leave the inner palace for a full year and did not choose a successor for two years. In 1691, Mohammad Taher Vahid Qazvini, a poet and court historian, was chosen as the grand vizier.

=== Later years and death ===
The new grand vizier was given full and unprecedented executive powers to overcome the realm's most urgent needs and problems. However, Vahid Qazvini proved to be a venal and ineffective grand vizier: He was extremely old, being seventy years old at the time, and lacked the energy to administrate. Moreover, he freely took bribes. Vahid also made many enemies in the court: his main rival was Saru Khan Sahandlu, the new qurchi-bashi. Saru Khan was from the Zanganeh tribe and was Suleiman's absolute favourite. In 1691, he killed forty members of his tribe, but the shah's favor meant that his crime was overlooked. However, he incurred Suleiman's wrath when it was discovered that he had started an affair with Maryam Begum, the shah's aunt. Suleiman ordered his death during an assembly in late 1691, during which he had offered wine to all the members presented except Saru Khan, and had him executed shortly after.

During his later years, Suleiman became more and more reclusive and his drinking finally made him infirm. In 1691, per the suggestions of the astrologers, he did not leave the palace for nine months. Simultaneously, the realm saw much unrest: in 1689, the Uzbeks raided along the Khorasan borderline and rebellions broke out in Balochistan. In 1692, Suleiman Baba took up arms against the Safavids in Kurdistan and rebellions are recorded in Kerman, Kandahar, Lar, and Georgia. Meanwhile, Suleiman was suffering from foot pain and in August 1692 it was rumoured that he had not left the palace for more than eighteen months. He did not appear in the hall of the Ali Qapu palace for the Nowruz festivities on 20 March 1694, and even declined to accept the customary gifts from governors and other grandees. The last time he was seen was on 24 March, when he presided over a very brief meeting, after which he returned to his harem. He did not leave the inner palace again before his death on 29 July. Many reasons have been suggested for his death, among them being having a stroke during a carousing session, dying from gout or from the decades of debauchery. According to the French cleric, Martin Gaudereau, his last words were: "Bring me wine." He was buried in Qom, like many of his ancestors, and was succeeded by his eldest son, Soltan Hoseyn, the third to the last Safavid Monarch.

== Policies ==
=== Religion ===
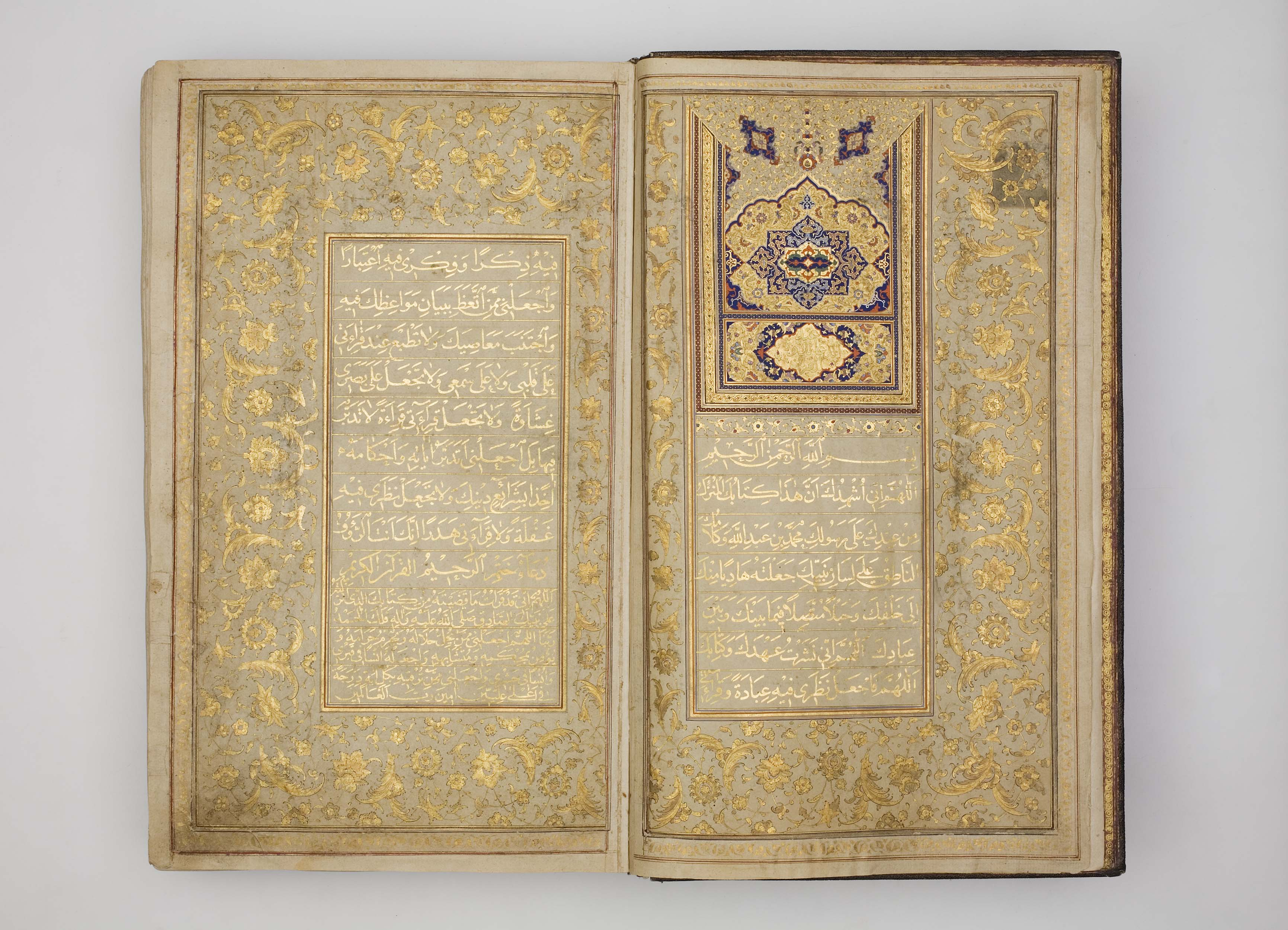
Single-volume Quran, belonging to Suleiman. Dated 1689–90, Isfahan.

Unlike his father, Suleiman was more religiously minded: he did not share his father's interest in Christianity, issued several decrees to ban the drinking of alcohol. His erratic behaviour makes it difficult to speculate how zealous he was towards the Shia tradition: he only once gave up drinking, in 1667: not for any religious reasons, but for his health and in particular an inflammation of the throat. During Suleiman's reign, Shia Islam was institutionalised as a functional arm of the state, however, dissent towards the shah was still heard. On numerous times, Shia scholars tried to dissuade Suleiman from drinking. One of these scholars, Mohammad Taher Qomi, the shaykh al-Islam of Qom, was almost executed for criticising Suleiman. Suleiman also continued to practice and expand upon local and popular religious beliefs. He ensured that the Muharram ceremonies were more of a festival than purely ‘devotional’. Cursing Yazid (Umayyad caliph responsible for execution of Husayn ibn Ali in Battle of Karbala) and the Ottomans on these ceremonies was encouraged. The shah took upon himself to embellish several imamzadehs and other ‘popular’ religious sites. Furthermore, he continued to insist on the leadership of the Safavid ancestral Sufi order, the Safaviyya.

In the struggle between the three main spiritual communities in this era (advocates of popular Sufism, philosophically-minded scholars, and sharia-minded ulama) the last group gained the upper hand in Suleiman's court. The ulama became ever more assertive and took advantage of Suleiman's indifference towards matters of state. Their new-found power manifested itself in the continued pressure on non-Shia Iranians; anti-Sufism essays increased greatly during this era. In 1678, the ulama of the capital accused Armenians and Jews of responsibility for the drought that afflicted much of the country in that year. Several rabbis were murdered and the Jews of Isfahan only escaped death by paying 600 tumans.

=== Diplomacy ===
Connections with foreign nations reduced greatly during Suleiman's reign. Like his father, he avoided doing anything that might lead him into diplomatic difficulties. Even when it was possible to wage war against the Ottomans (who were themselves fighting against nations during this era), he steadfastly refused to violate the peace treaty which his grandfather, Shah Safi, had made with the Sublime Porte in 1639, despite repeated offers from Mesopotamia (in 1684 and 1685) and from Basra (in 1690) that invited him to re-establish Iranian suzerainty there. On the same premise of keeping the peace with the Ottomans, Suleiman avoided relations with Europe except for a letter in 1668 or 1669 sent via the British East India Company to Charles II of England, asking him for skilled craftsmen. Suleiman even dismissed the Russian emissaries who arrived in Isfahan in 1670s to seek anti-Ottoman cooperation. The various European envoys who visited in 1684–1685 received the same response. No reciprocal missions to Europe have been recorded in this period.

During Suleiman's reign, envoys from the Mughals, Ottomans and Uzbeks arrived in Isfahan. However, only the Ottomans received a response. In 1669 and 1680, King Narai of the Siamese Kingdom of Ayutthaya sent envoys to the court of Suleiman. Their intentions were to request Safavid naval assistance against the Kingdom of Pegu. An Iranian delegation under the command of Mohammad Rabi' ibn Mohammad Ebrahim was sent to the court of Narai in 1685. The details of this mission were recorded by Ibn Mohammad Ebrahim in his account, Safine-ye Solaymani. The book consists of four parts and narrates the Iranians' journey to Siam and the Iranian community which existed in that country from the times of Abbas II. During Suleiman's reign, Iran continued to be a shelter for exiled notables of its eastern neighbours: for instance, in 1686, Suleiman offered shelter to Muhammad Akbar, the rebellious son of Aurangzeb.

=== Arts ===
Paradoxically given his intermittent relations with the west, the Farangi-Sazi or the Western painting style saw its zenith during Suleiman's reign. He was an outstanding connoisseur and, as the patron of arts, influenced directly or indirectly some of the most impressive works of the three greatest painters of the late 17th century Iran: Aliquli Jabbadar, Mohammad Zaman and Mo'en Mosavver. Suleiman inherited these painters from the patronage of his father, and promoted their works further by patronising both traditional Persian miniature, at which Mosavver was a master, and the new tendencies inspired by Western painting which characterise the work of Aliquli and Mohammad Zaman. Suleiman's sense of aesthetics, if it had blossomed during more favourable circumstances, could have led to the development of a new artistic era in Iranian history.

Suleiman's patronage also extended to architecture. He built the Hasht Behesht palace in Isfahan and ordered the repair of a number of buildings in Mashhad, including the shrine of Imam Reza, damaged during an earlier earthquake, and several schools. Moreover, many of courtiers during his reign began sponsoring buildings: Shaykh Ali Khan personally funded a caravanserai in the northwest of Isfahan (built in 1678) and in 1679 patronised a mosque in Khaju quarter of the city. He also built a school in Hamadan which he dedicated as a vaqf from his new-founded revenue.

== Personality and appearances ==
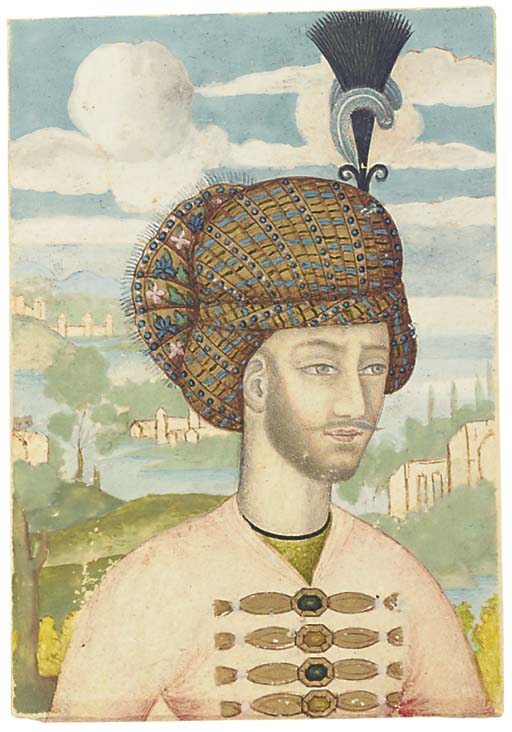
Portrait of a young ruler, probably Suleiman I, painted by a student of Aliquli Jabbadar, circa 1670-80

Suleiman lacked the best qualities his father was known for: energy, courage, decisiveness, discipline, initiative and an eye for the national interest, and after his second enthronement, it became clear that he neither desired nor was able to acquire them. Most of the contemporary observers speak of Suleiman's character as idle, gluttonous and lascivious, and also mention his tendency to extort his subjects for money. Throughout his life, Suleiman increasingly cherished wine and women, to such a degree that foreign observers asserted that no Persian ruler had ever indulged so greatly in both. He spent many an evening drinking with high court officials and during the royal Nowruz festivities, by his order, wine-drinking was excessively encouraged. Suleiman's drunken states often led into unpleasant consequences, such when he ordered the blinding of one of his brothers. As for lasciviousness, Suleiman's harem included at least 500 women.

Suleiman was generally described as mild-mannered, yet, there were times when he showed great rage, and even cruelty, especially when drunk. He enjoyed humiliating his courtiers by forcing them to drink alcohol. For the enforced drinking, a huge gold goblet was used, the capacity of which is variously given as about a pint and almost a gallon.

Regarding appearances, Jean Chardin described him as “tall and graceful, with blue eyes and blond hair dyed black and white skin.” This description seems to concur with that of Nicolas Sanson, who called Suleiman “tall, strong and active; a fine prince, a little too effeminate for a monarch who should be a warrior, with an aquiline nose, large blue eyes, a beard dyed black”.

== Coinage ==
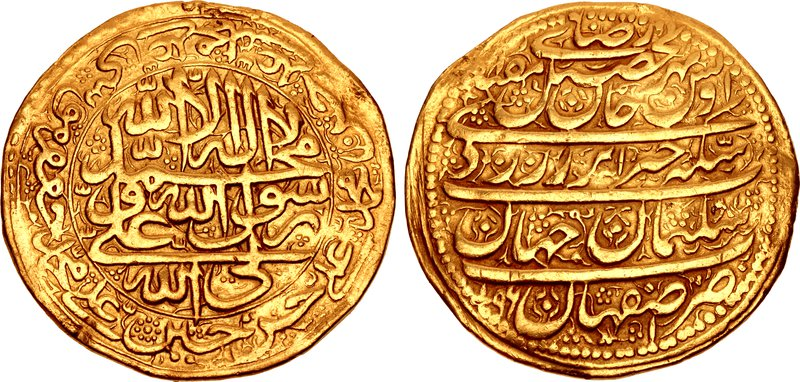
Gold coin of Suleiman I, dated 1684/5, minted in Isfahan.

Suleiman's reign saw the final stages of Iran's monetary unification system. The larin currency was discontinued during his reign, and only the mohammadis currency from Hoveyzeh, which gained special fame in Iran and abroad, was officially minted until the end of the shah’s rule.

There are no surviving Safi II coins left. Apparently, they were replaced by heavy silver coins issued for the first time in Safavid history. After his second coronation, Suleiman issued coins with the distichs, "Soleymān banda-ye shāh-e velāyat" (Suleiman, the servant of the realm's majesty). Gold coins (weighing about 57 grams) were rarely minted whereas silver coins were struck throughout his reign, usually in Isfahan and, less often, in Qazvin.

== Legacy ==
The reign of Suleiman I is often seen as the start of the final decline of the Safavid realm. According to the modern historian Rudi Matthee, Suleiman was what the British historian Hugh Kennedy calls an "internal absentee" (in reference to the tenth-century Abbasid caliph Al-Muqtadir), a ruler who "had no real appreciation of the constraints and limitations of the financial resources". He was a king who never reached “political adulthood” and was considered a weak and cruel ruler whose indifference and debauchery influenced the decline of the state of his realm. Jonas Hanway, who visited Iran decades after the Siege of Isfahan, calls Suleiman's reign "remarkable for nothing but a slavish indolence, a savage and inhuman cruelty." Modern historians who unanimously see him as a failed king. According to Hans Robert Roemer, the only redeeming aspect of Suleiman's personality and regnant was his patronage of arts.

Suleiman gave up on the concept of siyast or the ruler’s punitive capacity, an indispensable ingredient of statecraft, and instead led his grand vizier rule for him. As long as he had a competent grand vizier by his side, and as long as he himself intervened decisively at crucial moments, an idle shah was not necessarily fatal to good governance. With Shaykh Ali Khan, Suleiman chose a competent grand vizier. Yet, instead of supporting him wholeheartedly, he abused Sheykh Ali and forced him into inactivity. Suleiman was the first Safavid king who did not patrol his kingdom and never led an army; in these circumstances, power became concentrated in the hands of court eunuchs, harem women and the Shia high clergy, precluding a forward-looking policy based on a realistic assessment of challenges and opportunities.

Suleiman I of Persia Safavid dynasty Born: February/March 1648 Died: 29 July 1694
Iranian royalty
| Preceded by Abbas II | Shah of Iran; 1666–1694 | Succeeded by Soltan Hoseyn |
