= Persian clothing =

Traditional and historical Iranian costume of the courtly and urban population of Iran

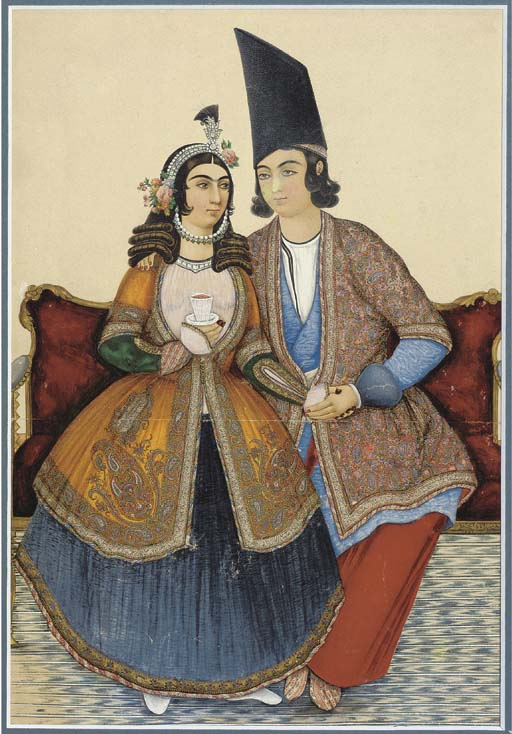
19th century Iranian couple in traditional costume

Traditional Persian clothing or traditional Iranian clothing is the historical costume of the courtly and urban population of Iran (Persia), before the Pahlavi dress reforms of the 1930s. Clothing in Iran can be divided into several historical periods, however little is known about its earliest history. The exact date of the emergence of weaving in Iran is not yet known, but it is likely to coincide with the emergence of civilization. There are historical discoveries in northern Iran from about 6,000 BC that refer to wool weaving at the time. Other discoveries in central Iran dating back to 4200 BC have shown that the animals' skin has not been the only clothing worn on the Iranian plateau since those years. The clothing of ancient Iran took an advanced form, with the fabric and color of clothing becoming very important, and over time Iranian civilization accepted various influences on its clothing from other cultures. Depictions of Iranian clothing can be found in Persian miniature and other artistic traditions across history in vivid or muted colors, though these pigments often do not match utilized dyes. Traditional Iranian clothing is seldom worn in urban areas in modern times but has been well preserved in texts and paintings throughout history. The earliest period of Iranian history from which a substantial corpus of garments survive to the present is Safavid Iran

Clothing from Achaemenid period is known from reliefs, glazed bricks, statues, seals, and coins, as well as Greek textual and visual sources. Clothing varied depending on social status, eminence, the climate of the region, and the season, while generally consisting of headgear, overgarment, shirts, tunics and trousers, and could be generally divided into a Perso-Elamite court dress, and cavalry costume primarily of Median origin, with headgear being the most well documented. As for the Arsacid dynasty most historical evidence originates from abroad, particularly in ancient Mesopotamian cities and vassal Kingdoms of the Parthians such as Hatra. In this period shalvār or trousers are the most common and distinctive feature, coupled with tunics fastened at the belt. The foundational elements of clothing in the subsequent Sassanian period were the continuation of Arsacid and Median traditions.

Following the Arab conquest, Iranian dress remained notably conservative for several centuries, retaining Sasanian and Central Asian forms despite the introduction of Turkic fashions and a gradual shift toward more androgynous styles. Under the Umayyads, Sasanian-style fitted coats and trousers gained favor at court alongside Byzantine influences, contrasting with earlier untailored Arab robes. Evidence for costume under the Iranian dynasties of the ninth and tenth centuries is comparatively scarce, especially for women. By the late Seljuk and post-Seljuk periods, ceramics, metalwork, wall paintings, manuscript illustrations, and stucco sculpture provide a much fuller picture of elite dress, in which newer Turkic fashions were combined with older Iranian forms and patterned textiles became especially prominent. Court ateliers consequently provide much of the surviving visual evidence for costume. Under the Ilkhanids, court dress was further shaped by extensive exchanges of khilʿat with the Mamluks and by centralized textile production, with artisans from Varamin, Nishapur, and Tus attached to princely workshops, while Tabriz, Kerman, and Yazd emerged as major textile centers supplying the Mongol court.

Iranian attire from the Safavid period onwards generally consisted of a pirāhan (shirt) and thick shalvār (trousers) worn beneath a long qabā, over which wealthier individuals wore fur lined outer garments such as kaftāns, kātebis and kolijehs, secured at the waist with a shāl or kamarband. Distinctions between social classes were expressed chiefly through the quality of textiles, embroidery, and ornament rather than through different garment forms. Women's dress likewise followed many of the same structural principles, differing primarily in head coverings such as the dastār and rūband, while many underlying garments remained closely comparable in construction, while for the most part, many women in this period would use male clothing articles. Following the collapse of the Safavids, clothing under the Afsharid and Zand dynasties remained largely a continuation of late Safavid fashions, although contemporary observers described it as less luxurious and characterized by greater practicality and restrained elegance. The most visible changes occurred in headwear, as Safavid turbans gradually gave way to the Afsharid kolāh-e Naderi, the Zand shāl-kolāh, and eventually the tall black Qajar kolāh. By the early Qajar period, this continuity was still evident in both men's and women's clothing. Men retained the established layered costume, while women increasingly distinguished between andarūnī dress worn within the household and bīrūnī dress worn in public. In larger cities, public dress came to consist primarily of the black chādor, a long rūbandeh, and chāqchur, whereas rural and smaller urban communities preserved more colorful local traditions such as Arkhāleq and Shaliteh.

Iranian Clothing Across Time

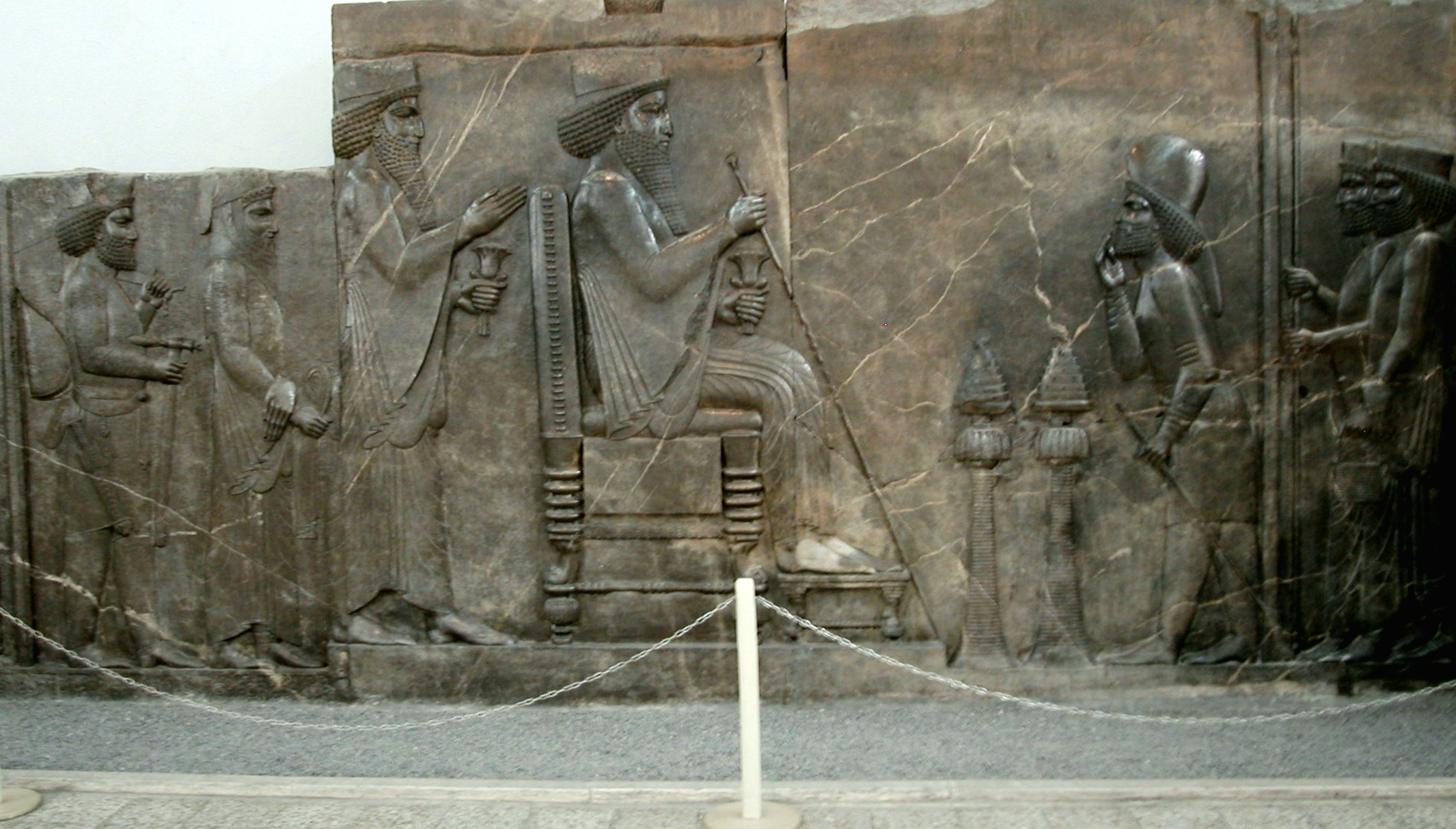
Achaemenid period

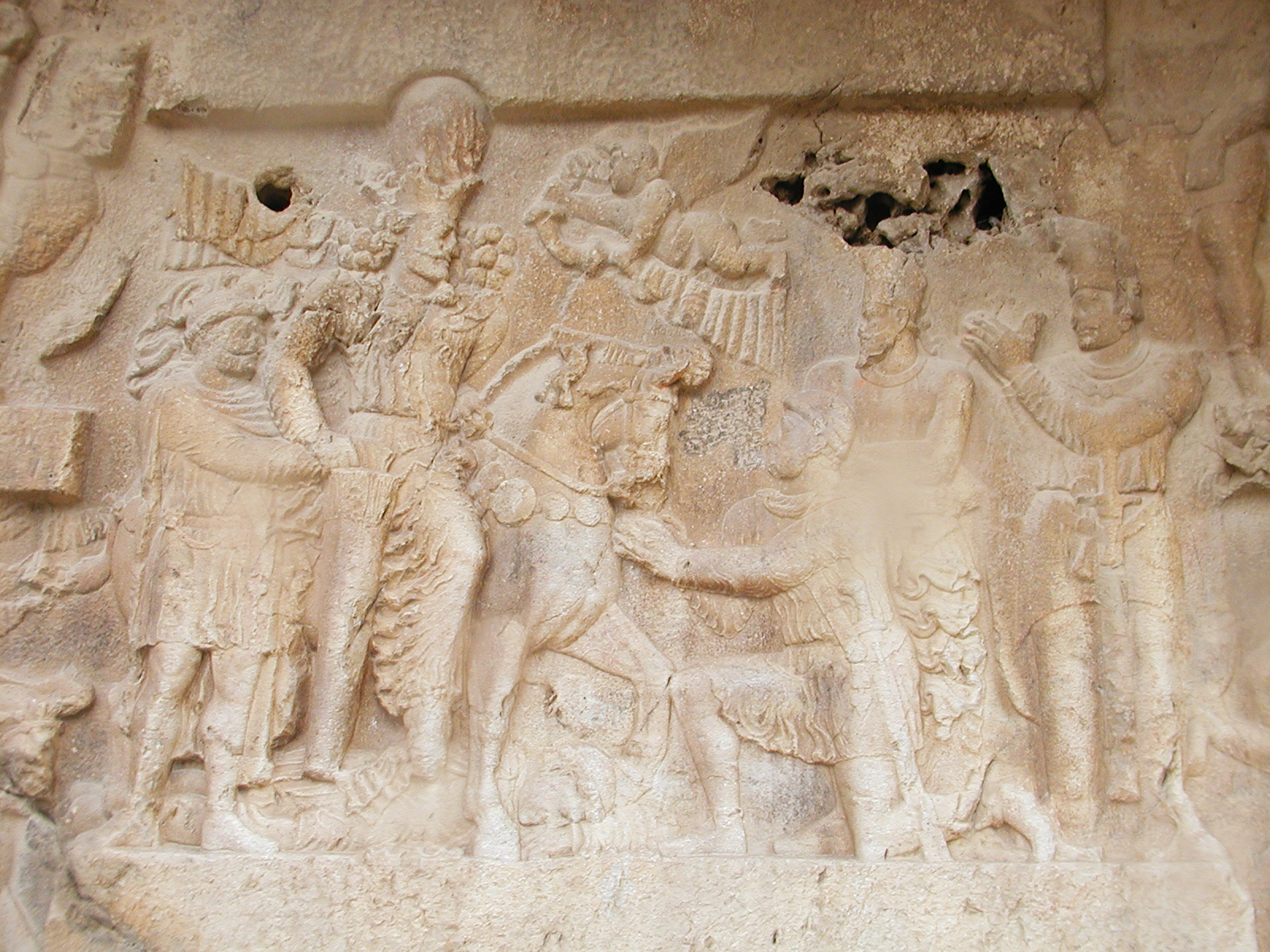
Sassanid period

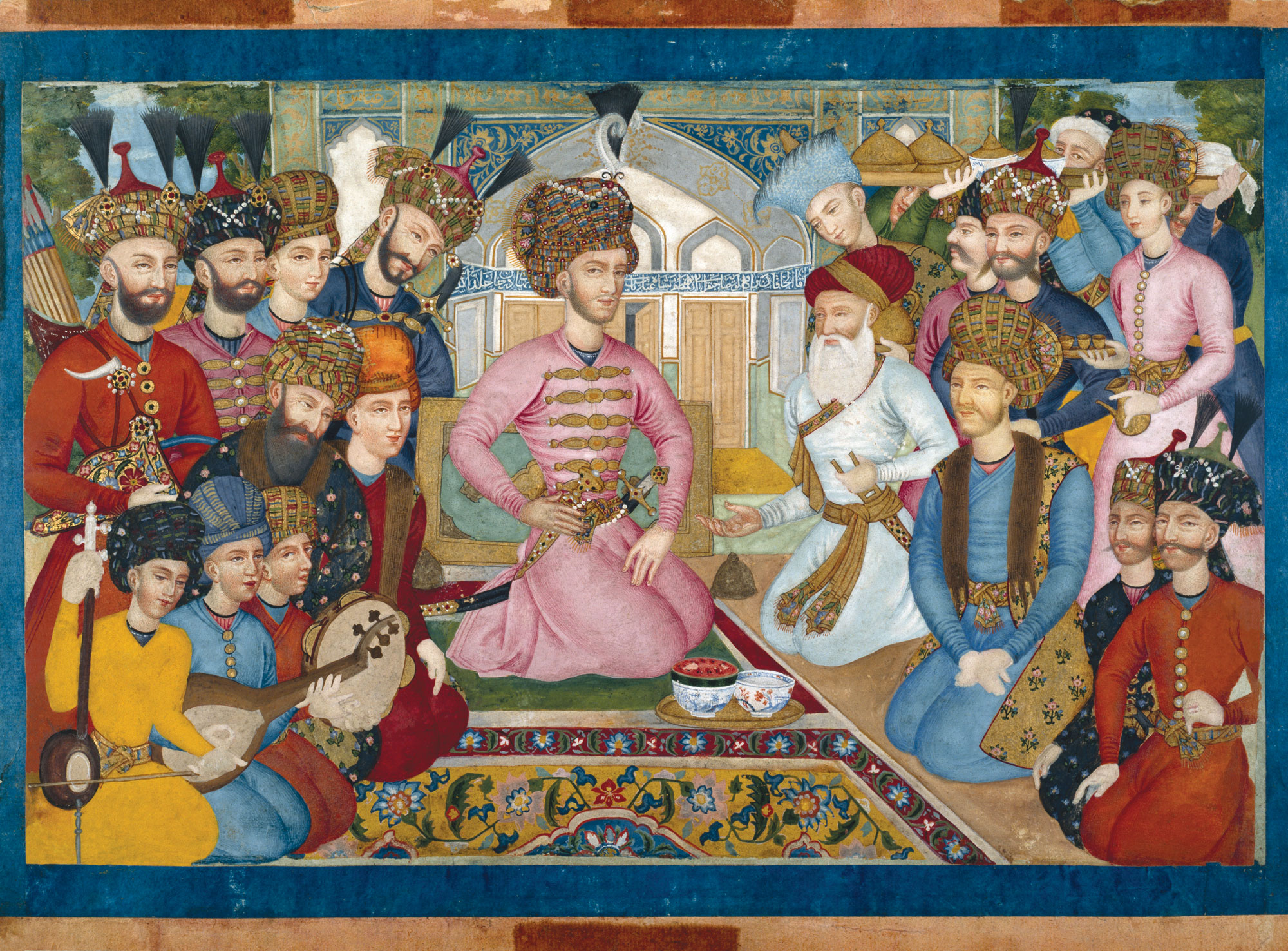
Safavid period

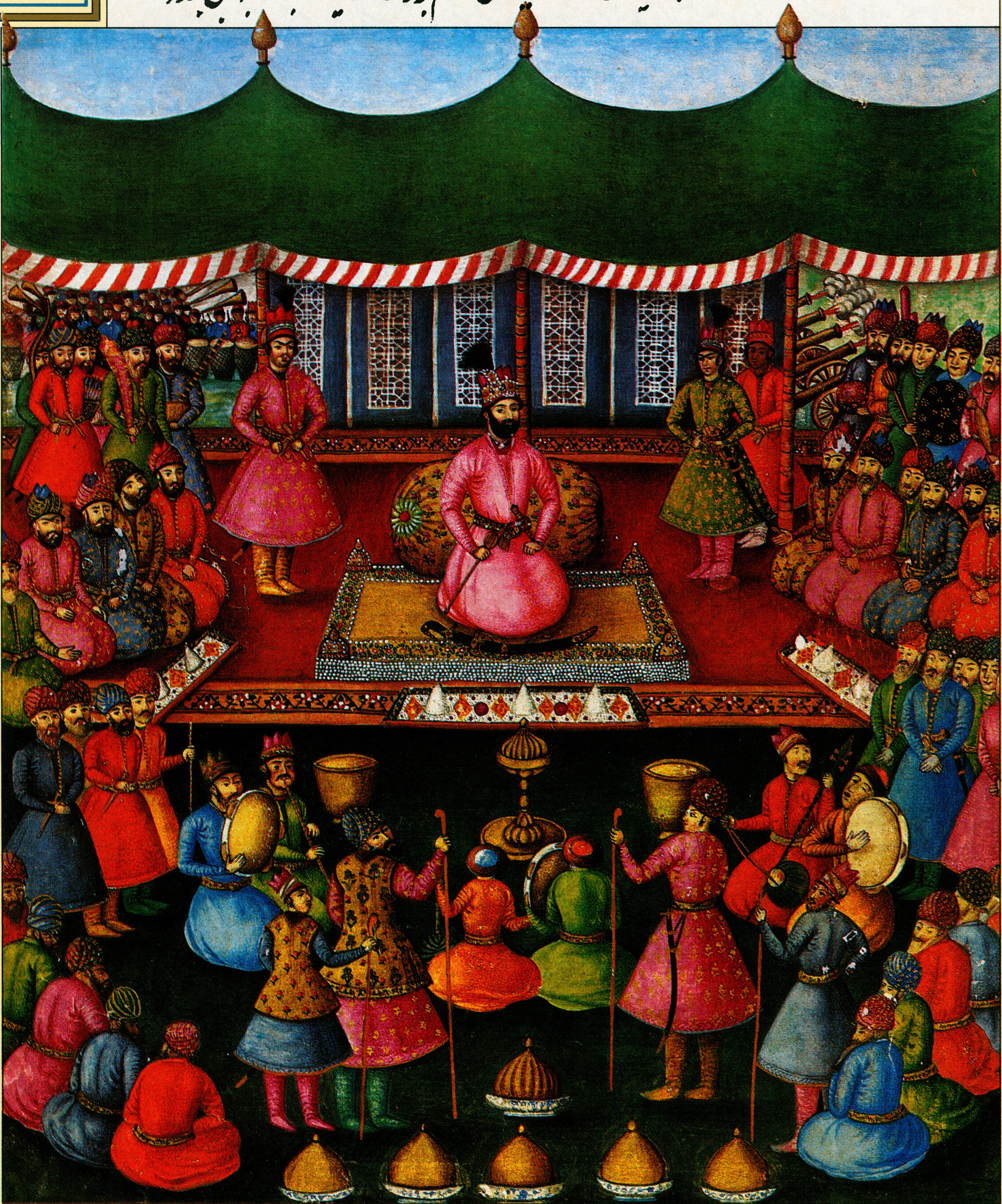
Afsharid period

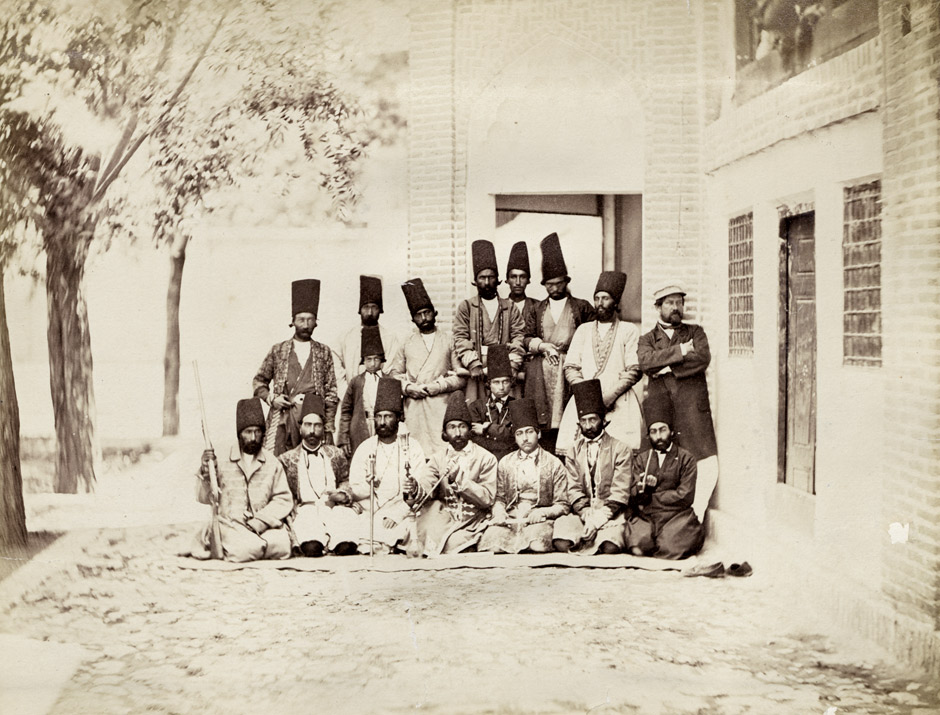
Qajar period

== Achaemenid Period ==
=== Court Dress ===
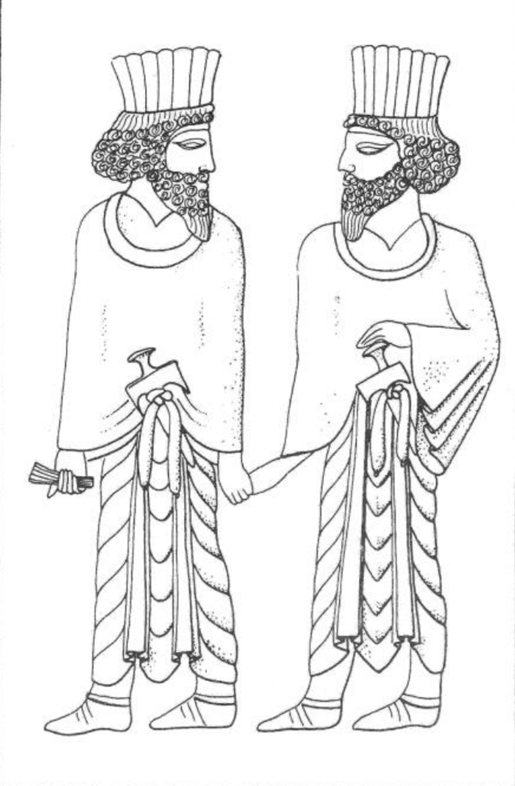
Persian men wearing pleated robes

The pleated robe is formed from a rectangular cloth, typically with a width of about 120–150 cm and a length exceeding the wearer’s height. It is tailored with two main components: the pleated outer garment and a lower skirt or underpiece. The main cloth is pleated in the chest and shoulder areas, leaving the arms free and forming a flowing drape down the body. It is usually tied at the waist and gathered in the back, where it creates tiered waves or ridged folds, giving it both volume and shape. Some depictions suggest a front-slit design or a V-shaped neckline, while others show it as completely wrapped. The lower section consists of either one or two additional pieces that wrap around the waist and hips, often secured with a leather belt or cord, resulting in a skirt-like appearance underneath the pleated top layer. In some cases, the robe may be worn in a single-piece configuration, but it also appears as a combination of upper and lower garments, creating a layered effect. Achaemenid Persian clothing was a structured and symbolic extension of the wearer’s rank, function, and geography. The garments varied in color, fabric, and cut based on social class, region, climate, and the season. Clothes were made from fine materials such as silk, linen, or wool, and were often dyed in vibrant colors like saffron, white, purple, and orange, each signifying different social or symbolic meanings. Notably, purple was reserved for royalty and those of elevated rank, often decorated with golden threads.

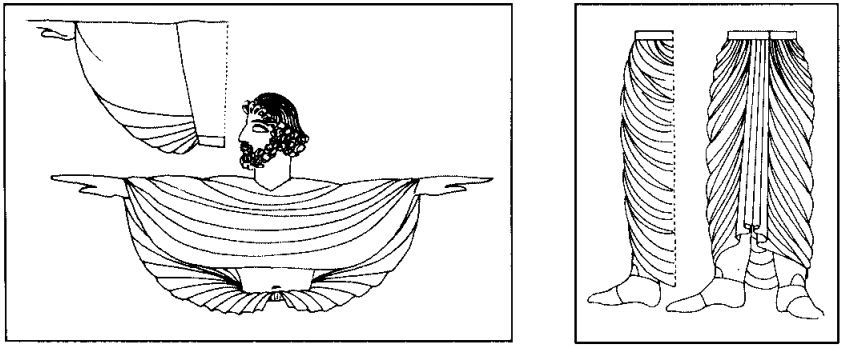
Sketch depicting the structure of the Persian robes

The structure of the robes are contested in various sources, with some describing them as one piece and others as two piece, but Mehrasa Gheibi gives the following description of the garments:

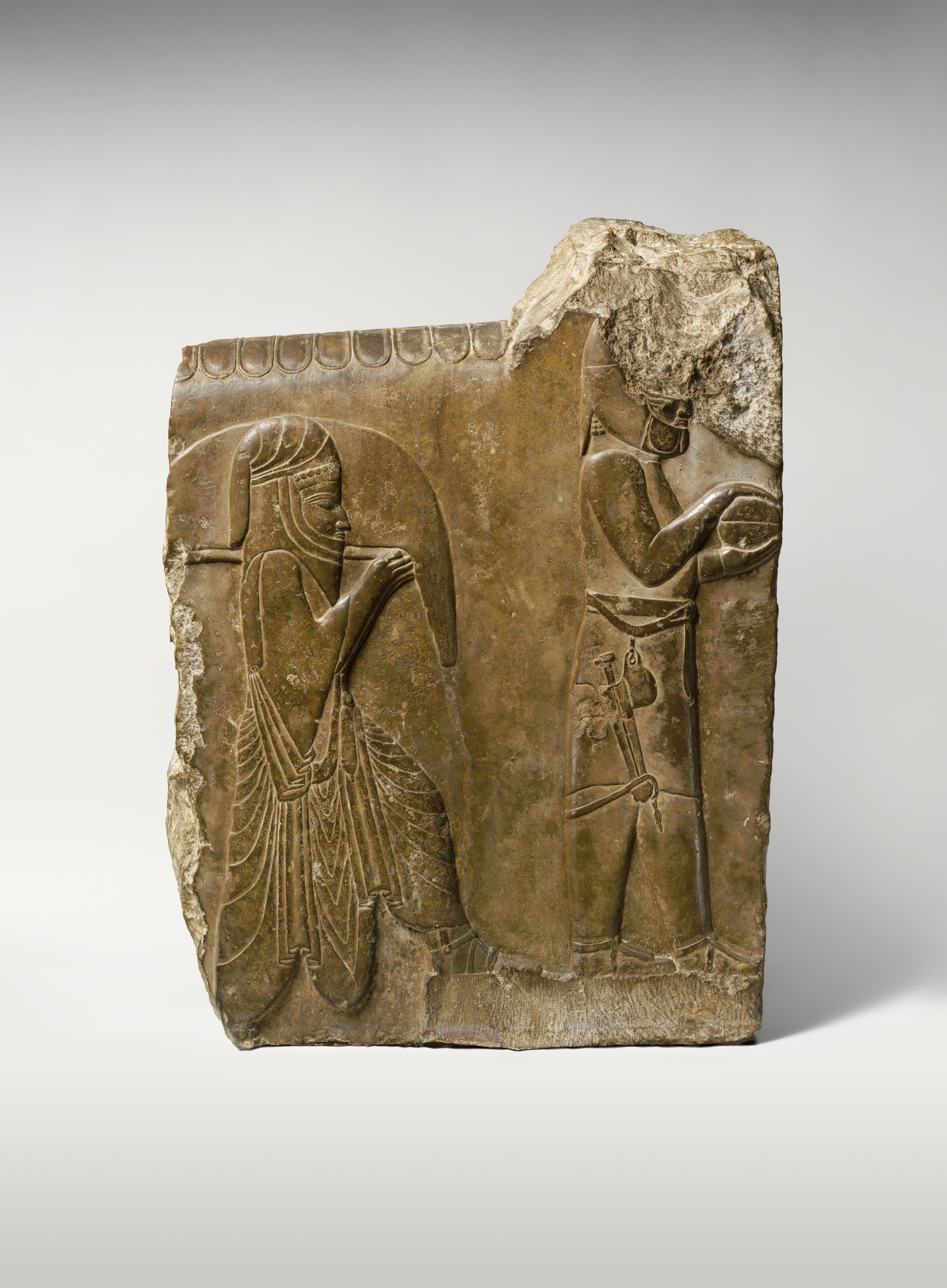
Example of the Achaemenid long scarf headwear

"It is my opinion that Achaemenid robes were likely made from a single rectangular cloth, sewn closed at the sides except for an underarm opening. The sleeves and pleats were shaped by structured stitching and tucking, creating layered folds similar to those seen in stone reliefs. Horizontal pleats on the chest do not indicate a two-piece garment but rather a continuous design with added front panels."

Despite the existence of their own distinct costume, the Persians frequently wore Median attire.

Achaemenid court headwear could consist of simple, twisted headbands, displayed on the heads of the royal guard in the reliefs of Persepolis, a circlet or fillet commonly dawned by Elamites or Persian soldiers, with a wider variant decorated with floral designs and embroidery, a round cap used to distinguish the Medes, a long scarf of wool, silk or linen wrapped tightly around the head and neck, with only the facial center exposed, often worn in reliefs by royal towel bearers and various stairway attendants and servants, and cylindrical hats of smooth or fluted construction, with the former associated with royalty and the latter with Persian dignitaries, both referred to as "mitra" by Herodotus.

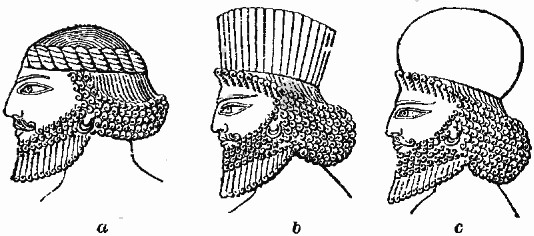
a. Twisted headband, b. Fluted mitra, c. kolāh namadi

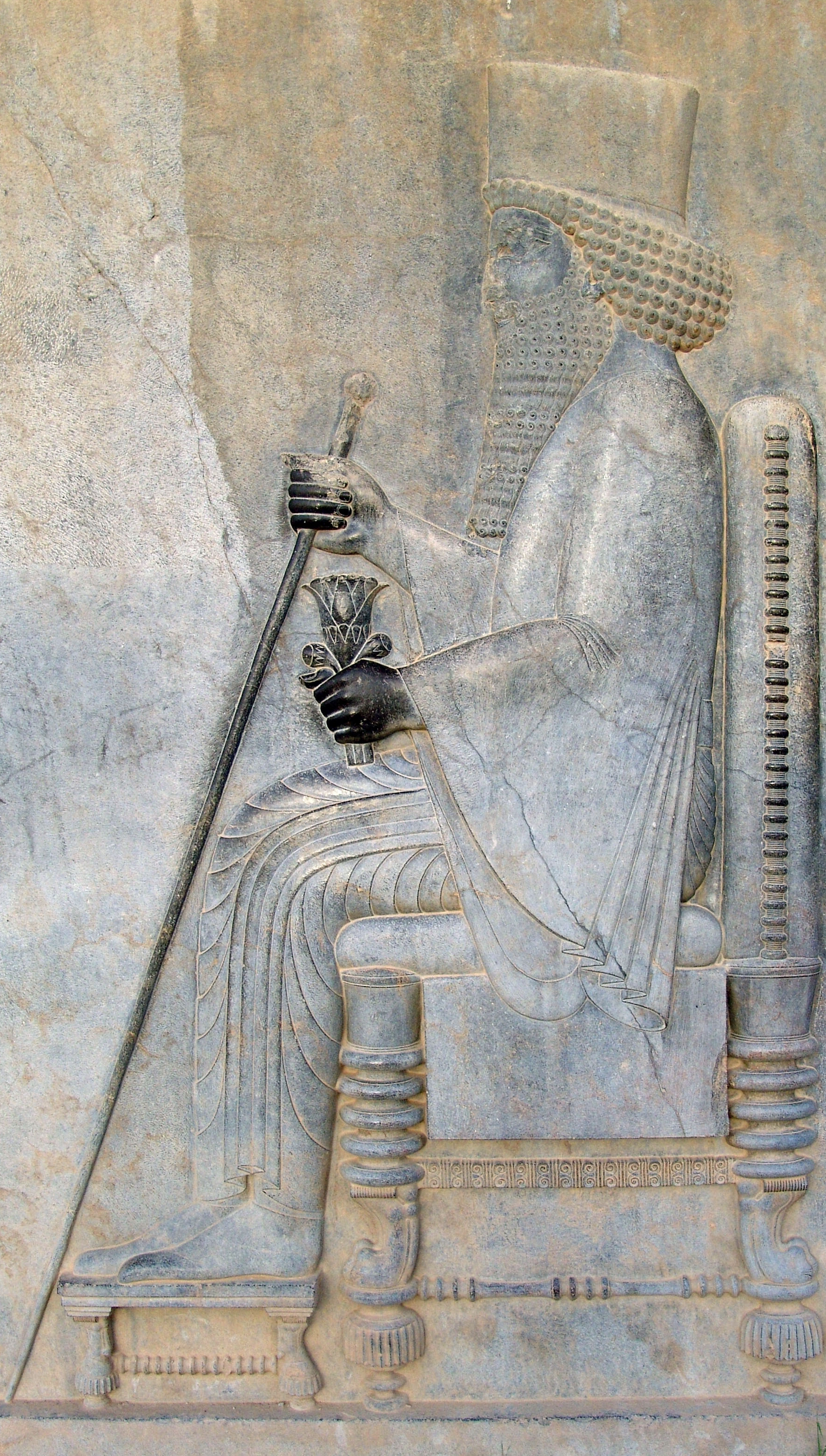
Relief of Darius I in pleated robes and a smooth mitra

The mitra was the primary royal crown of the Achaemenids, a tall, cylindrical or fluted symbolic headdress often referred to as a “semi-crown” or “helmet-crown.” It resembled a stylized cylinder with 18 to 22 vertical flutings or ribs and was secured with a cloth band (ribbon or turban) tied around it. Though appearing ceremonial, this structure was tightly bound and firmly seated on the wearer’s head. In artistic depictions, especially on reliefs from Persepolis—the cylinder is often shown worn by the Shah and high-ranking individuals during official ceremonies. In wartime, a sturdier version was fashioned for the king, functioning like a helmet or protective headgear, distinguishing it from general noble headwear. This war-version was likely made of bronze or hard leather, showing durability and symbolic authority. The primary garment of women, similar to men, was the Persian robe. The robe could vary in form: some versions lacked diagonal front folds, while others had broad panels falling behind the back like a cape, possibly gathered or tied. Hair was typically worn long and fastened with a wide barrette, while headgear ranged from decorated tiaras and diadems to bordered veils and serrated headscarves, though full veiling was uncommon among noblewomen. Accessories included neckbands, bracelets, penannular earrings, and, in domestic contexts, perfume birds and incense burners. Decorative elements such as dog-tooth borders, gold embroidery, spangles, and stitched trims embellished the robes, and silk or light wool, dyed in Mesopotamian fashion, was likely used. While the robe could be adapted for different occasions, its consistent structural complexity and ornamental detail made it a clear marker of class, hierarchy, and ceremonial function within the empire's upper stratum, distinguishing noblewomen from flower-carrying attendants or handmaidens, who wore simpler versions and often lacked ornate tiaras.

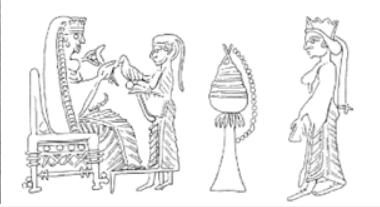
Impression of Achaemenid seal depicting Persian women

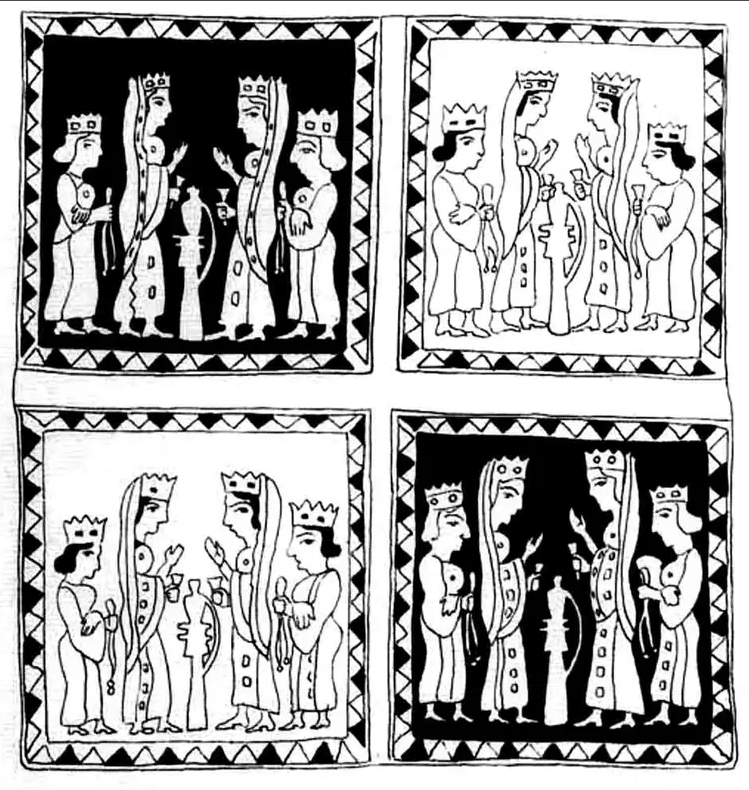
Depiction of Persian women on saddle cloth

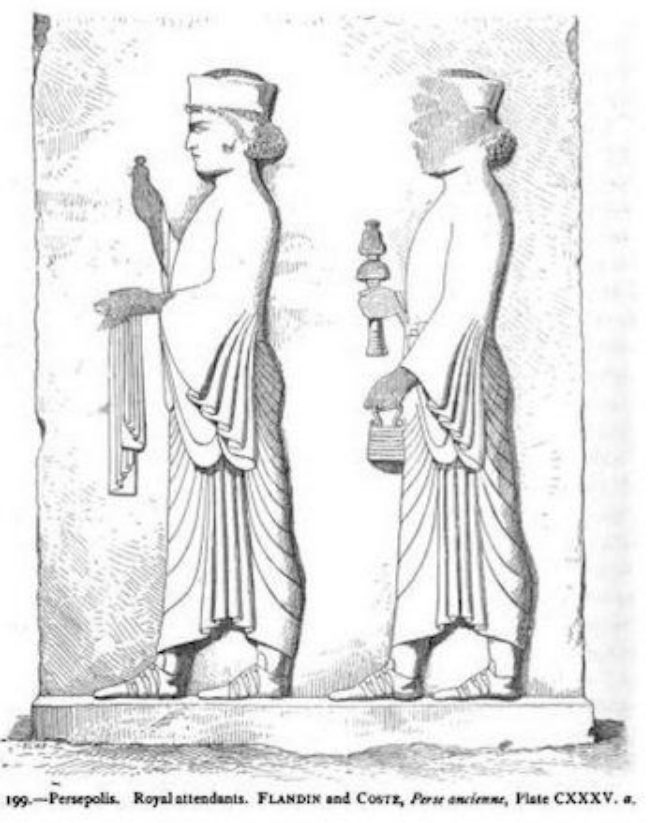
Achaemenid women in Persepolis - wearing pleated robes and short mitras

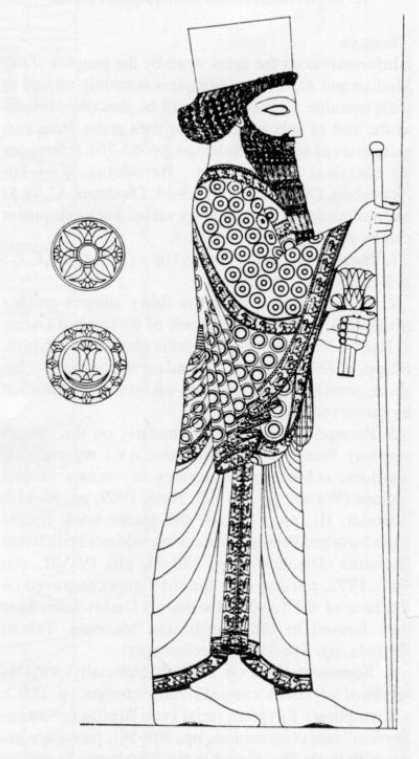
Sketch of Xerxes depicted wearing the pleated robe and a mitra - Persepolis

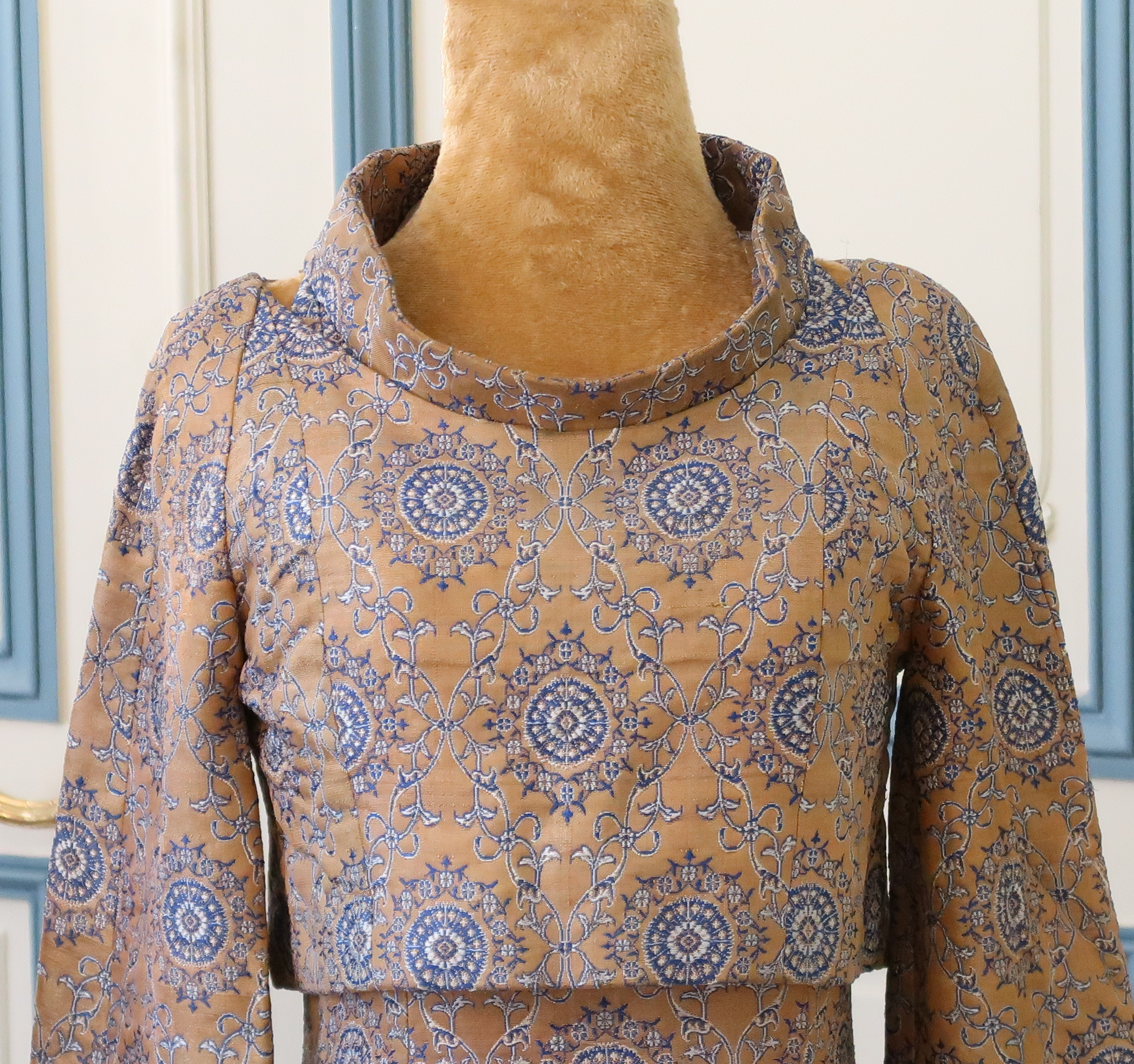
A modern two-piece dress inspired by the Achaemenid style - Queen Farrah Pahlavi

=== Cavalry Costume ===
The various Median forms of headwear largely consisted of simple bands wrapped around the head, kolāh namadi and varieties of the kurpāsa, the latter of which was popular among the Achaemenid satraps and often part of the infantry uniform.

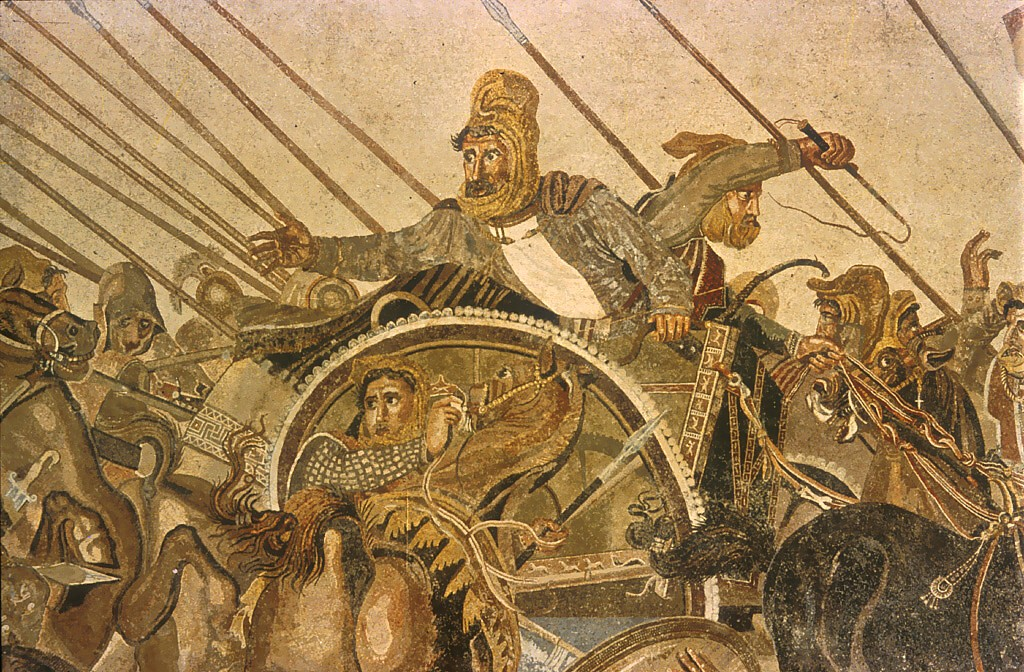
Darius III depicted wearing a kandys and upright kurpāsa

The kurpāsa, or kyrbasía -- which may or may not have been identical to the kídaris, tiara, kítaris (Lat. cidaris) -- was a head covering made from felt, leather, silk, or soft fabric, worn primarily by Iranian peoples such as the Persians, Medes and Scythians, it was later adopted and modified in Europe as the Phrygian cap. It covered the head, neck, ears and the cheeks, with very long side flaps that could be tied over the chin, at either side of the neck or hung loose over the ears, with the bonnet encircled by a deyhīm, which looked like a band knotted at, and falling down the back. The deyhīm was used to distinguish the kinsmen of the great king, with the satraps allowed to knot theirs at the front side of their kurpāsa. The top of the kurpāsa could be sharp and tall or shaped like a sack bent backward or forward. The Achaemenid kurpāsa looked like a hood and was often lined with fine animal fur inside. Most people wore it flat, with the top either folded into three bumps at the front or hanging down to either side of the head. Only the Great King could wear his kurpāsa standing upright, probably supported internally. It was often used for travel, horseback riding, or speaking with the King, in order to prevent breath from being exhaled toward the king's face. Additionally, the Magi wore a loose cloth over the nose and mouth to prevent their breath from defiling the sacred fire. the kurpāsa is variously identified by scholars as a satrapal headdress or Persian cap.

The Scythians wore the kurpāsa so tall that its tip bent backward while one group became known to the Persians as the "Saka Tigraxauda" (the pointed-hat Scythians) because of their tall, pointed headgear. Research in Turkology and Iranology suggest continuity in the use of the kurpāsa between the ancient Iranian and Turkic peoples, with the garment being referred to in Turkish as Bashliq (Persian: باشلیق/باشلِق, Turkish: Başlık), enjoying prevalence among Turkic populations. The kurpāsa became widespread from Tibet to the Hellenistic world, the Middle East, and various nomadic peoples.

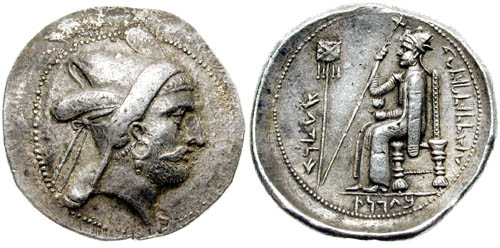
Portrait of Bagadates, ruler of Persis, wearing a kurpāsa with the ear flaps pulled backwards and held with a deyhīm (left) and a kandys (right)

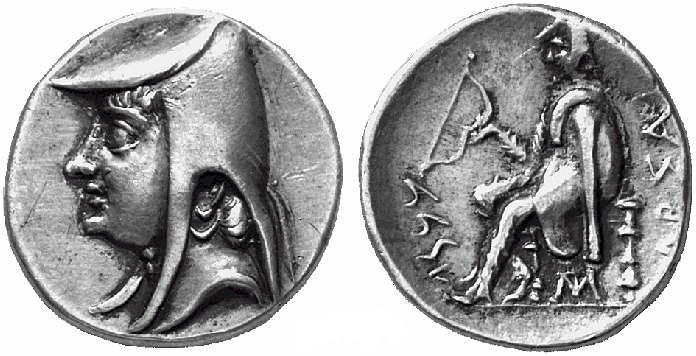
Arsaces I of Parthia wearing a loose kurpāsa with the earflaps left down

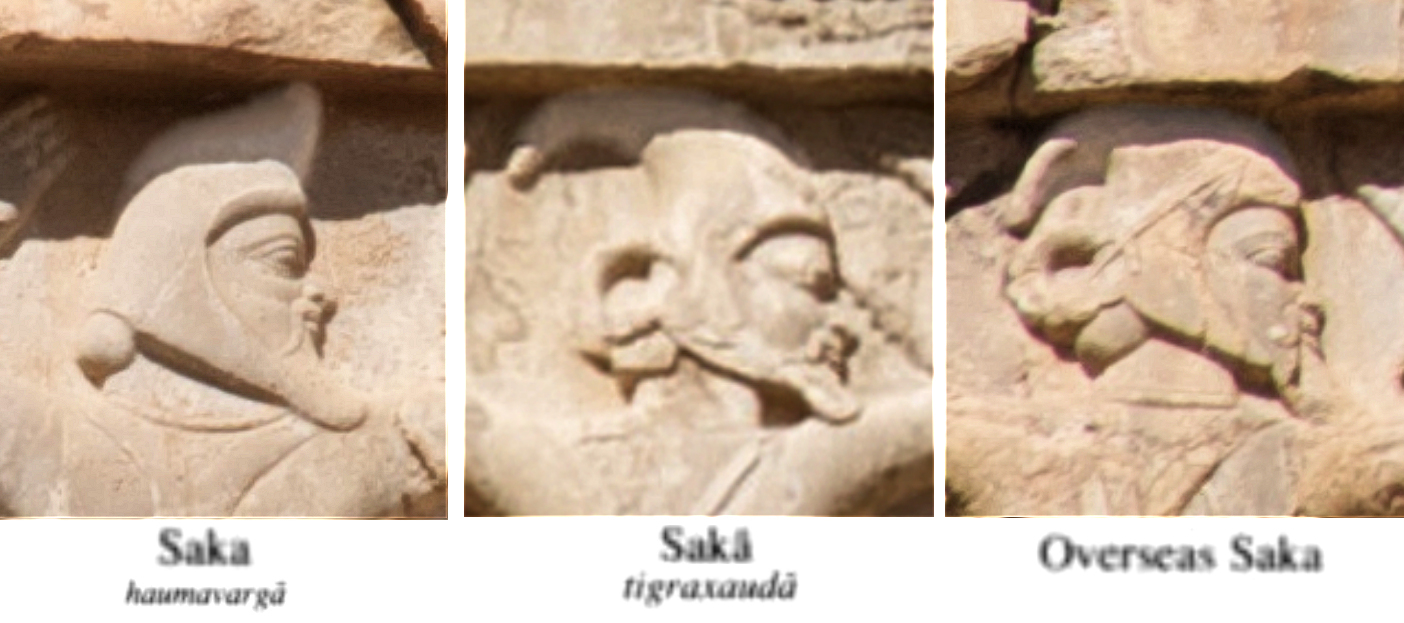
3 types of Saka wearing variations of kurpāsa depicted in Xerxes's relief

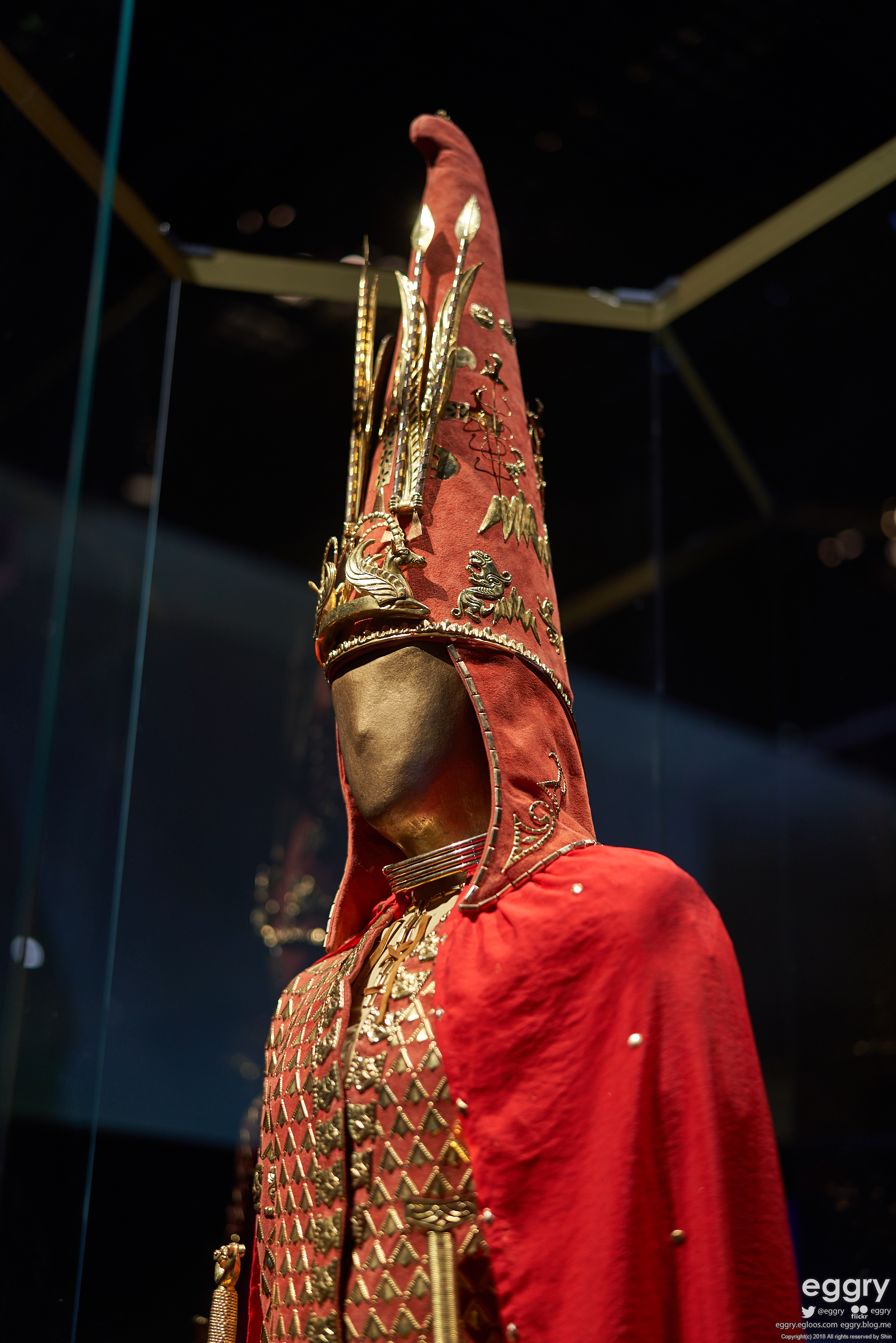
An ornate, tall Scythian kurpāsa - golden man

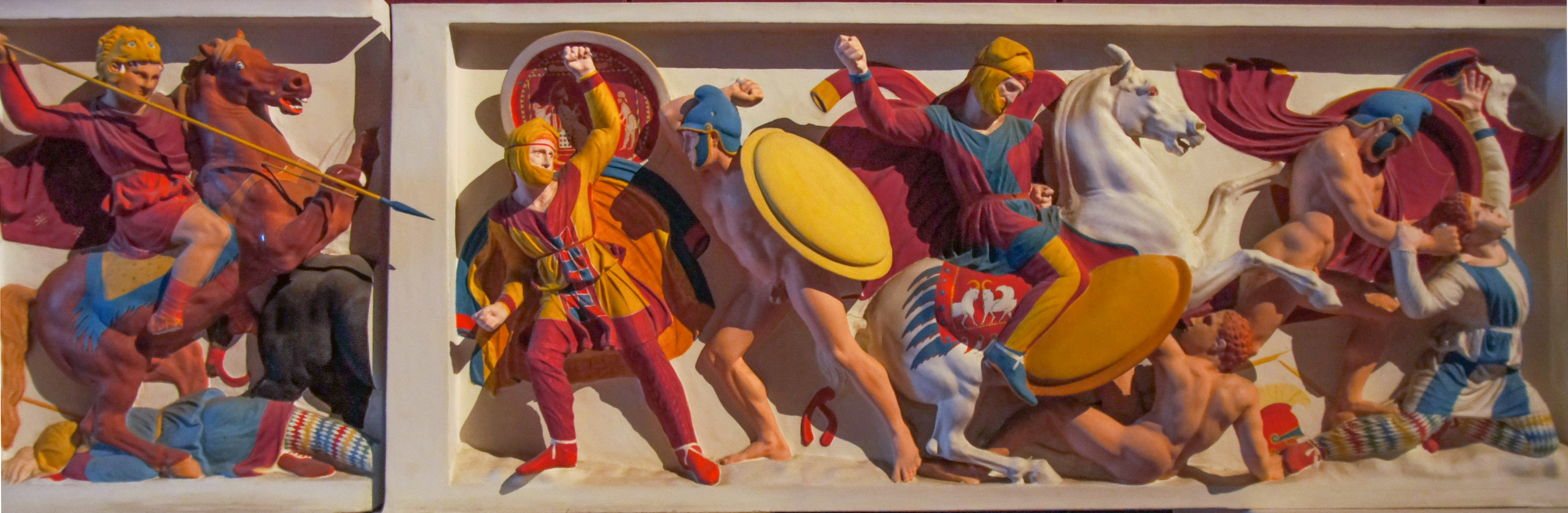
Greek depictions of the kurpāsa in the Alexander Sarcophagus

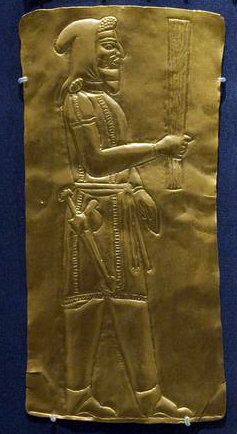
A kurpāsa-wearing Magi carrying a barsom - Oxus treasure

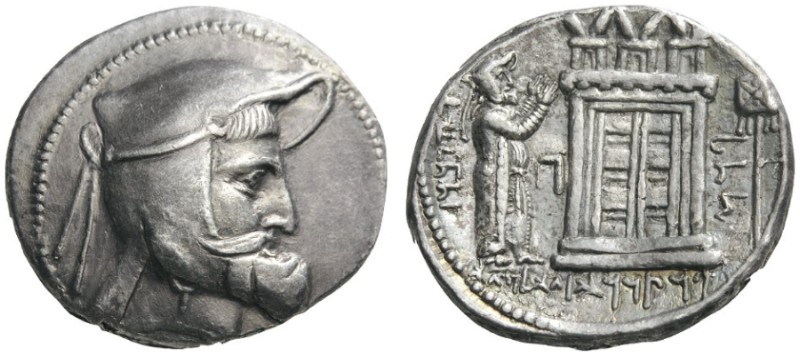
Coin of Vahbarz, wearing a stylized satrapal kurpāsa with flaps wrapped around the chin

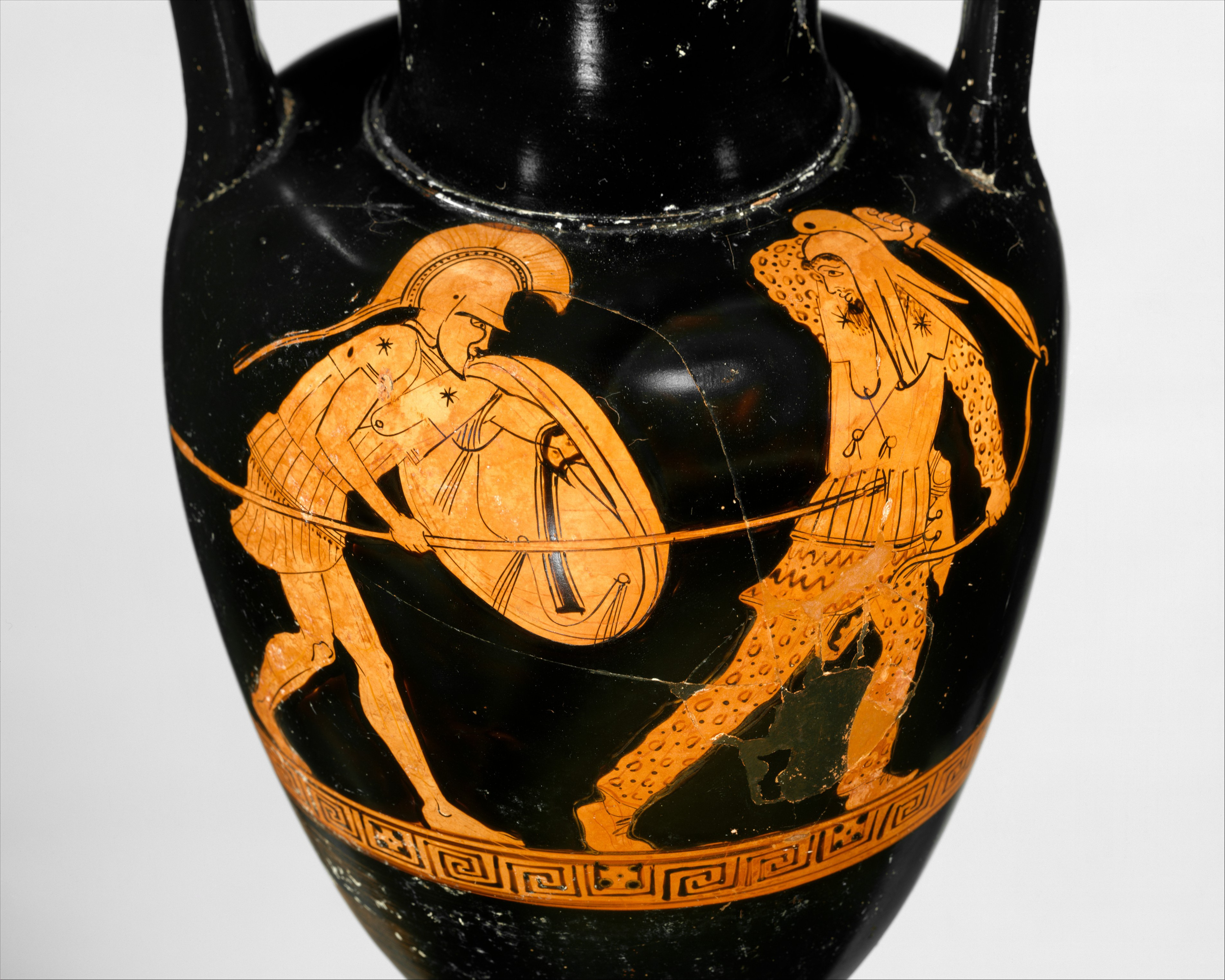
Depiction of a Persian (right) on a Greek vase - wearing a loose kurpāsa with a curved top

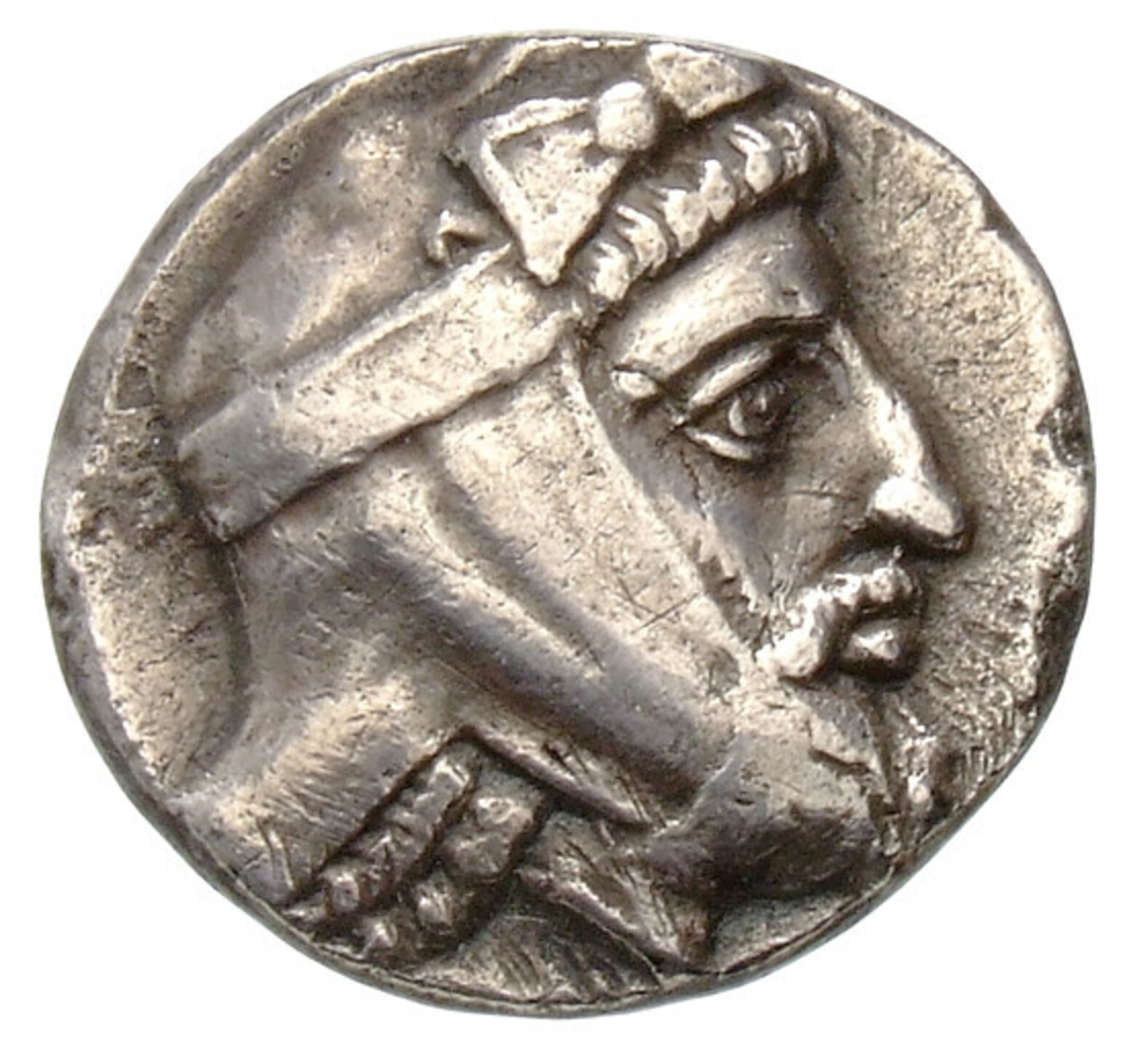
Tissaphernes depicted with a kurpāsa, the deyhīm knotted at the front of the head instead of the back

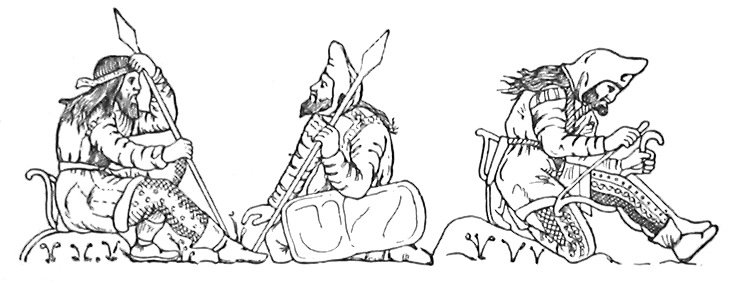
Depiction of Scythians wearing short-flapped, simple kurpāsa

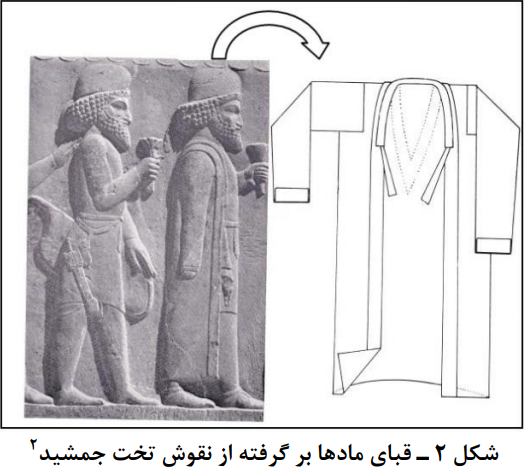
sketch of a kandys

The candys also written as kandys was a Median qabā and a ceremonial Persian outer garment, likely derived from Old Persian kandu- (“to cover”), with related forms in Elamite, and Parthian languages. It was a full-length cloak with long, often unused sleeves, draped over the shoulders rather than worn like a fitted coat. Made from fine materials, sometimes edged with fur, and dyed in purples or mixed royal colors (red, blue, white), the candys signified noble or royal status.

Although in its earliest known form in 4th–5th century BC it was shaped more like a cloak which could have decorative sleeves, only used formal settings. The Persian candys were often purple color, or made from leather and skins. Encyclopædia Iranica has stated many scholars believe candys, along with a long-sleeved tunic called a sárapis and long trousers called anaxyrides, formed the riding dress of the Median people; which was portrayed in the Persepolis reliefs. It's possible it was an article of clothing associated with nobility.

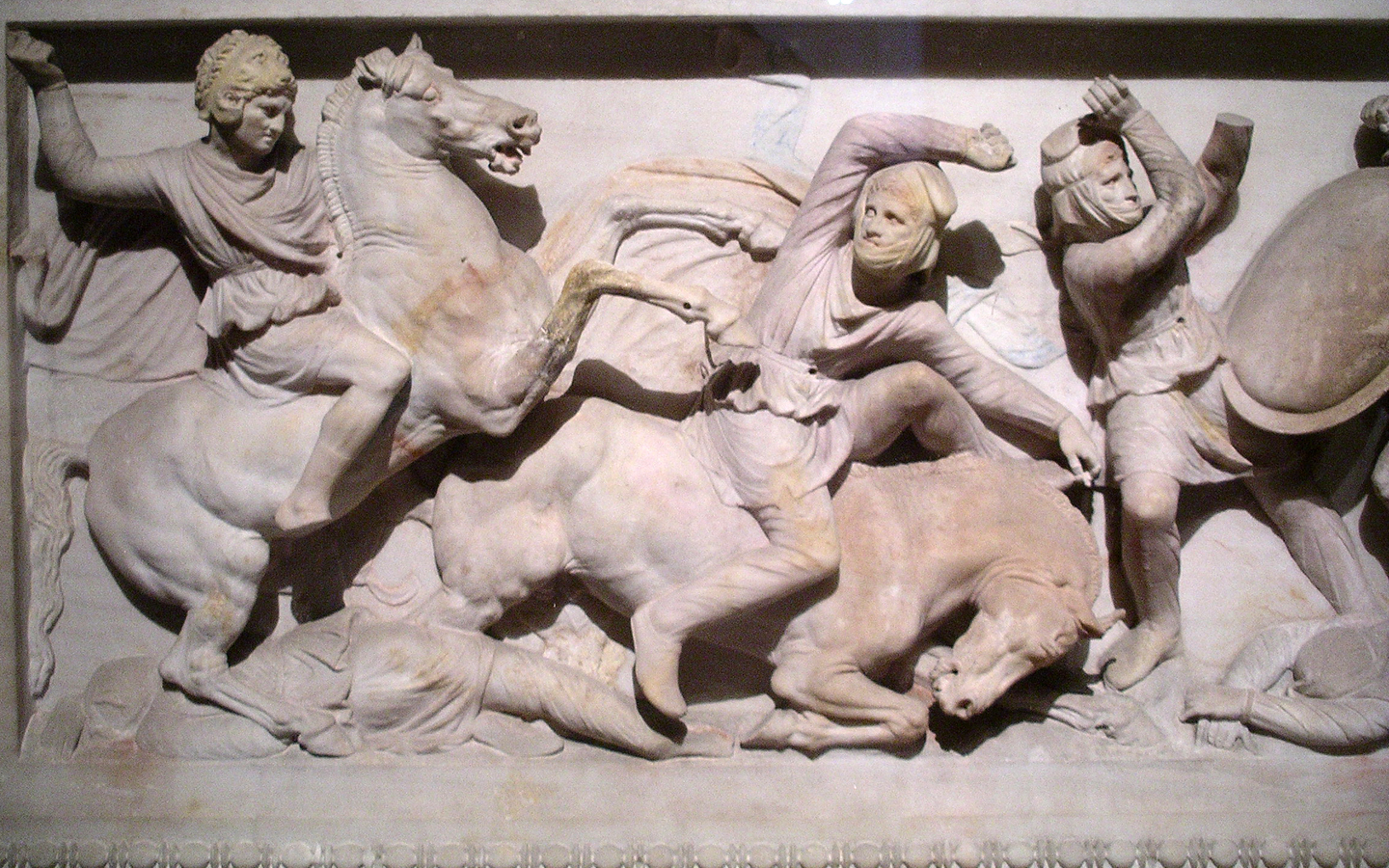
Persians (right) depicted in sárapis and Shālvār

The Median dress consisted of a plain, unpleated tunic that was closed in the front and had no seams, reaching as far as the knees, with tight sleeves, a simple hem, and no collar; it was pulled over the head to wear. Later, a more detailed version made of cloth became common. This new style had long sleeves, a wide V-shaped collar, and is clearly seen in artworks like the Alexander Mosaic and Sarcophagus. The belt sat high on the waist, and the lower part of the tunic could be tucked into it during battle. Some Greek vases also show Persians wearing sleeveless versions of the tunic. The tunic is referred to as chitón by the Greeks and the Persian equivalent for the term is believed to be sárapis. Possibly that as early as the end of the 2nd millennium BCE, the migrating Iranians brought with them the sárapis that had been developed in Eurasia, where the climate fluctuated sharply and life depended on cattle raising and the use of the horse, particularly in fighting

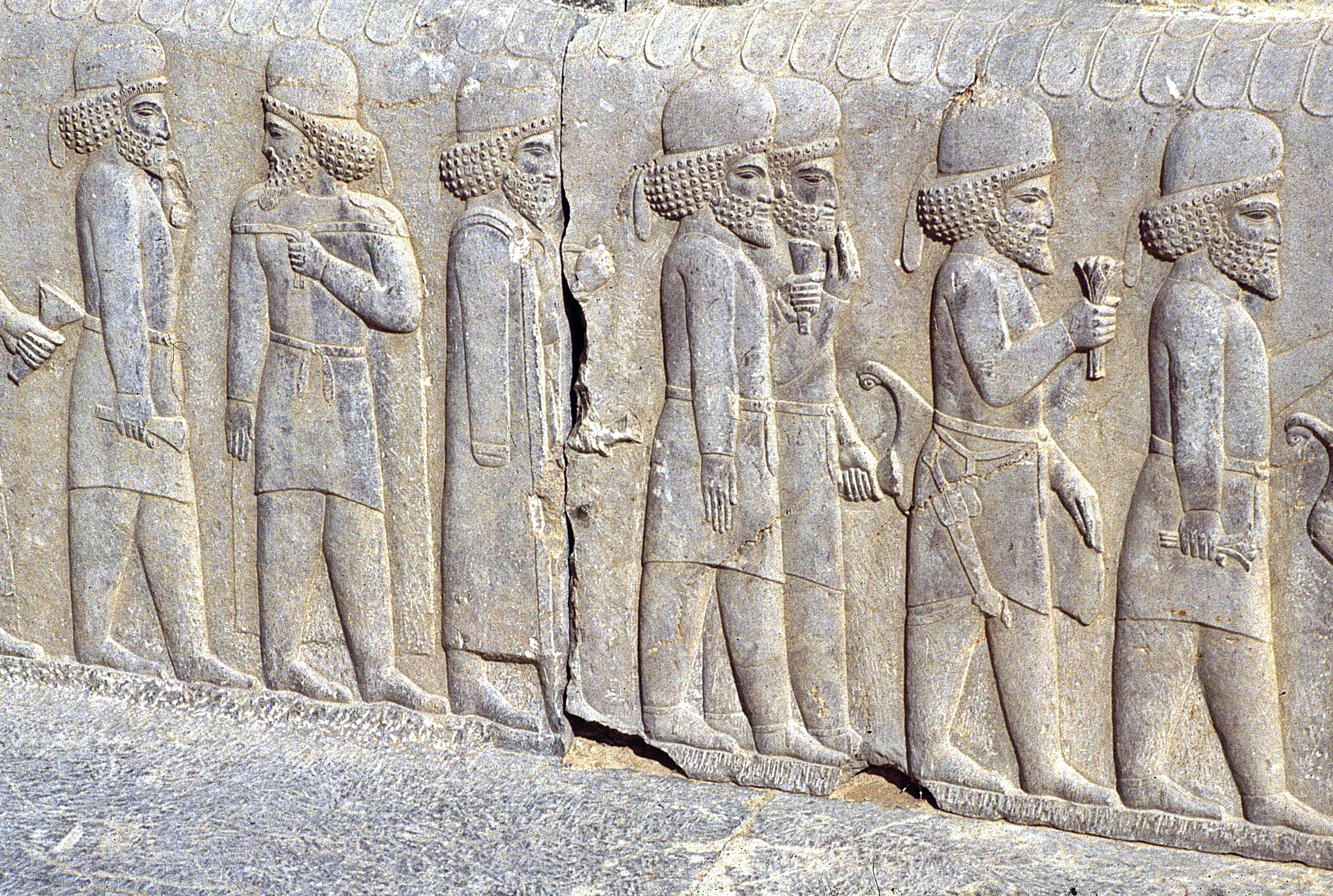
Depiction of Medes in Persepolis - Wearing Shālvār, sárapis, and kolāh namadi

Shālvār (Persian: شلوار, Old Persian: šaravāra) is a form of trousers introduced from Persia to other Middle Eastern regions. The Greeks often referred to the colorful trousers of the various Iranian peoples as anaxyrides. The Median trousers are long, and the width of each leg tapers gradually as it approaches the ankle, becoming narrower and more fitted. A thin strip of cloth is wrapped around the lower part of the trousers, allowing the fabric to be gathered and secured. This strip is tied around each leg, on either side of the trousers, providing a complete fit below the knee and preventing creases or folds. This style is similar to what is seen in modern tapered trousers. The simplicity of this design, combined with the use of belts or sashes, results in a very soft and finely tailored garment. These trousers typically feature a waistband twice the width of the belt.

=== Middle class clothing ===
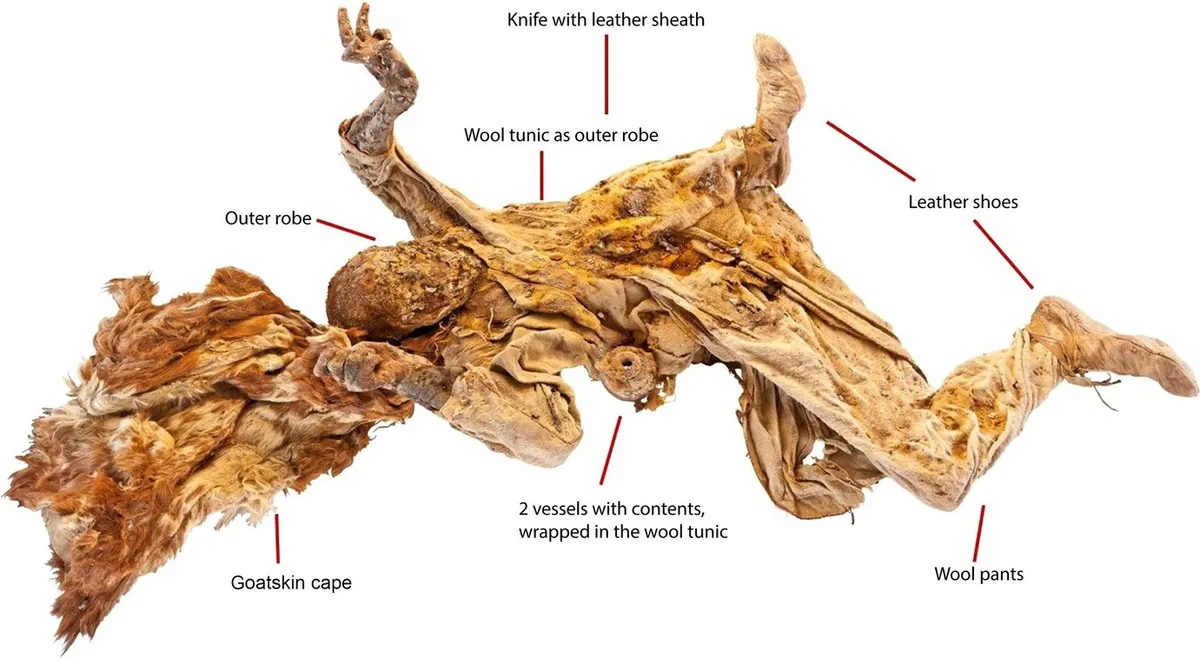
Remains of Saltman 4 with clothing in tact

The naturally mummified remains known as the "Saltmen" suggest that the clothing of working and middle social strata was functional, technologically advanced, and adapted to environmental and occupational conditions. This is in contrast with Greek representations which emphasize elements intended to reinforce cultural and ideological distinctions between Greeks and Persians.

The Saltmen's clothing reveals a coherent and highly functional system of dress. Garments were made of dense woolen textiles, arranged in multiple layers to provide insulation and durability. Trousers and long-sleeved tunics allowed for mobility and protection. Leather boots with complex construction techniques supported working on uneven and cold environments. Decorative elements, such as embroidery and colored threads, were applied selectively along seams and structural points.

== Middle Iranian Period ==
=== Kulaf ===
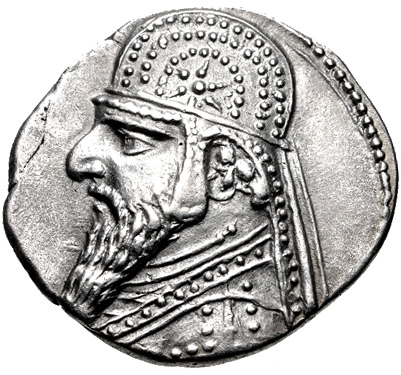
Coin of Mithradates II, depicted with an ear-flapped, decorated Miter-kulāf and deyhīm

The kulāf (Persian: کلاف, Middle Persian: kwl'p) or kolāh, also referred to as a miter or tiara in modern scholarship, was a form of elite headgear used in the Middle Iranian period. It functioned as a marker of royal, noble, and official status and underwent significant formal variation over time. Variations in style and structure of the kulāf exist simultaneously in the Phrygian-like, Sassanian, Arsacid Miter, and Hatran designs.

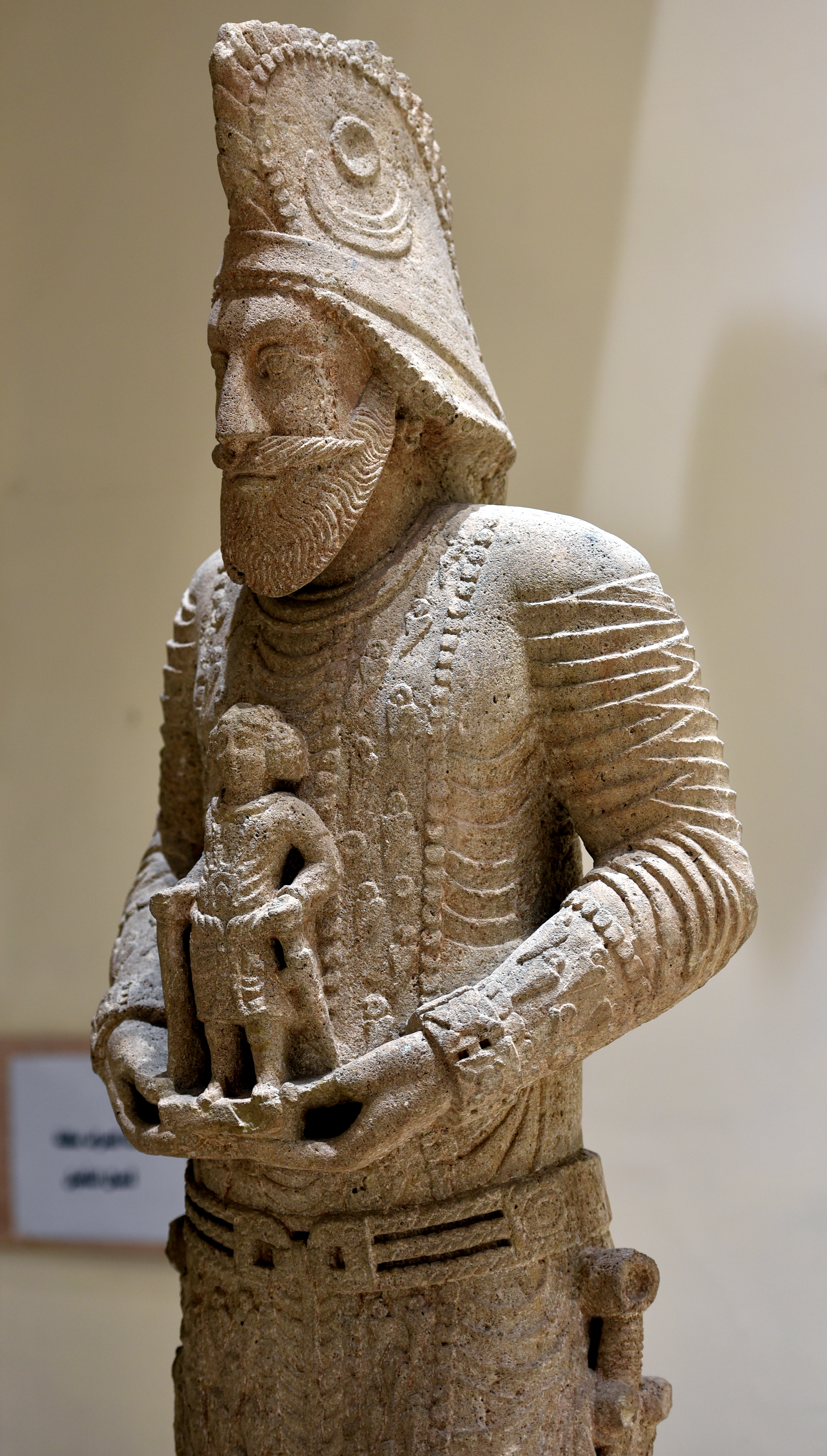
A limestone statue from Hatra, depicted with a Hatran-style Miter

The Arsacid style kulāf (or Miter) is best known from coinage and is characterized by a tall, rounded form, sometimes equipped with earflaps and sometimes without. These caps were commonly made of felt with certain examples showing additional decorative projections along the border or upper sides, extending downward to cover the back of the head and ears. The ceremonial Miter first appears in the late coinage of Mithradates II as an original royal creation. It was outlined by rows of pearls or scalloped bands and decorated laterally with six- or eight-pointed stars, while retaining the diadem as a constant element. Although the basic form of the miter and the use of the diadem remained stable, crests, side devices, and color schemes were altered by successive rulers, indicating that these headpieces were personalized rather than hereditary; when a form was reused, its color was typically changed to preserve individual distinction.

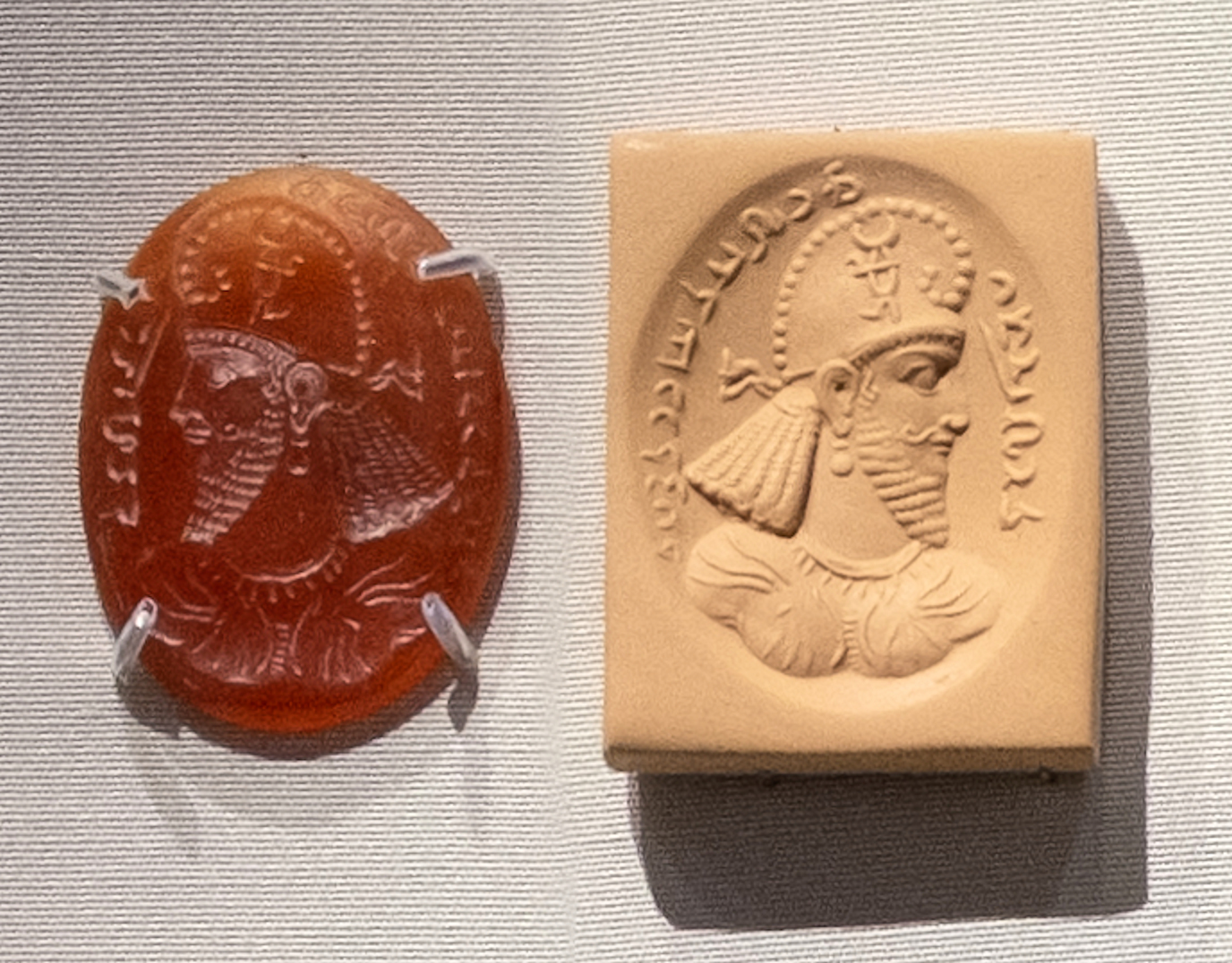
Seal of a Sassanian official depicted wearing a decorated Phrygian-style kulāf and short-ribboned deyhīm

A related but regionally distinct form is the Hatran style, visible in royal sculpture from Hatra. These miters appear tall, narrow, and tapering, sometimes almost pointed when viewed from the front. Scholarly interpretations differ regarding their construction. some suggest they were made of soft material and reflect a Semitic tradition, while comparable Arsacid representations on coins imply the use of rigid or reinforced fabrics, possibly derived from helmet forms. Over time, the ribboned diadem associated with earlier forms was in some contexts replaced by rigid bands composed of rows of gems positioned above an ear-and neck-covering guard. Sculptural representations, such as Hatran royal statues with flame-shaped medial crests, may reflect simplified versions of more elaborate crown designs known from coinage rather than literal depictions of everyday court attire.

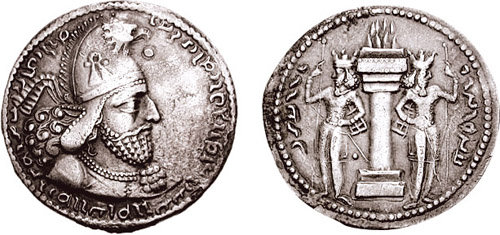
Coin of Shapur I with an animal-headed Kulaf

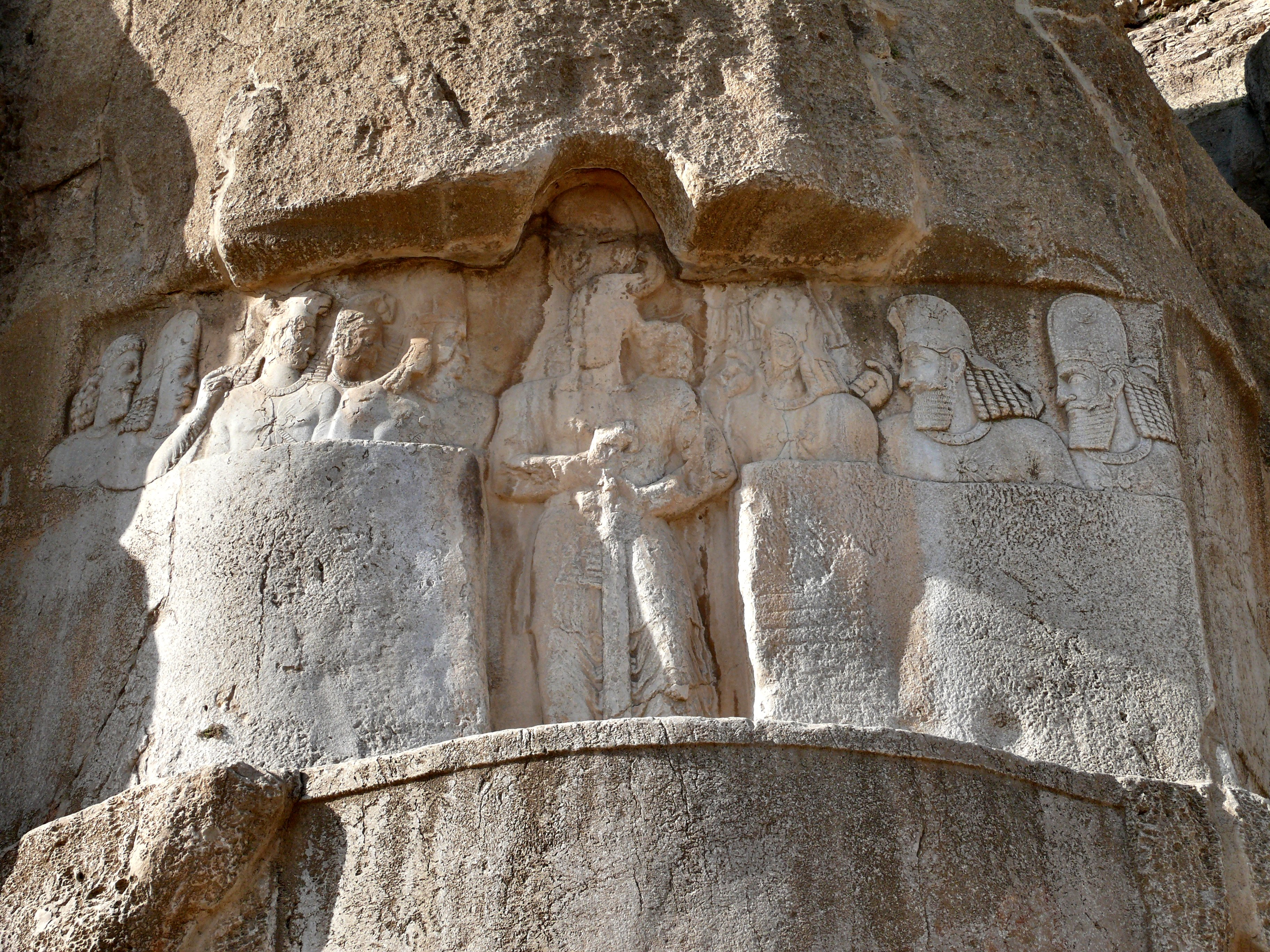
Naqsh-e Rostam relief featuring Bahram II flanked by his nobles, depicted with a variety of Sassanian-period kulāf

The Sasanian style kulāf shows further structural development, particularly in the treatment of the ears and hair. Reliefs and sculptures depict felt caps constructed to descend downward and obliquely, enclosing or covering the ears and overlapping the hair. In some cases, a guard-like extension protected the neck. These features suggest a combination of ceremonial display and functional coverage, reinforcing the role of the kulāf as a visual marker of noble or official authority in Sasanian Iran. Another variant is the Phrygian kulāf style, which took the form of a soft cap with a bent-forward or drooping tip. This type could be worn independently or combined with a taller conical structure and was frequently ornamented to indicate rank or royal ideology. In elite or symbolic contexts, the terminal point of the cap could be shaped into animal or bird forms, while thin ribbons, knots, or insignia were occasionally attached as markers of social distinction

=== Deyhim ===
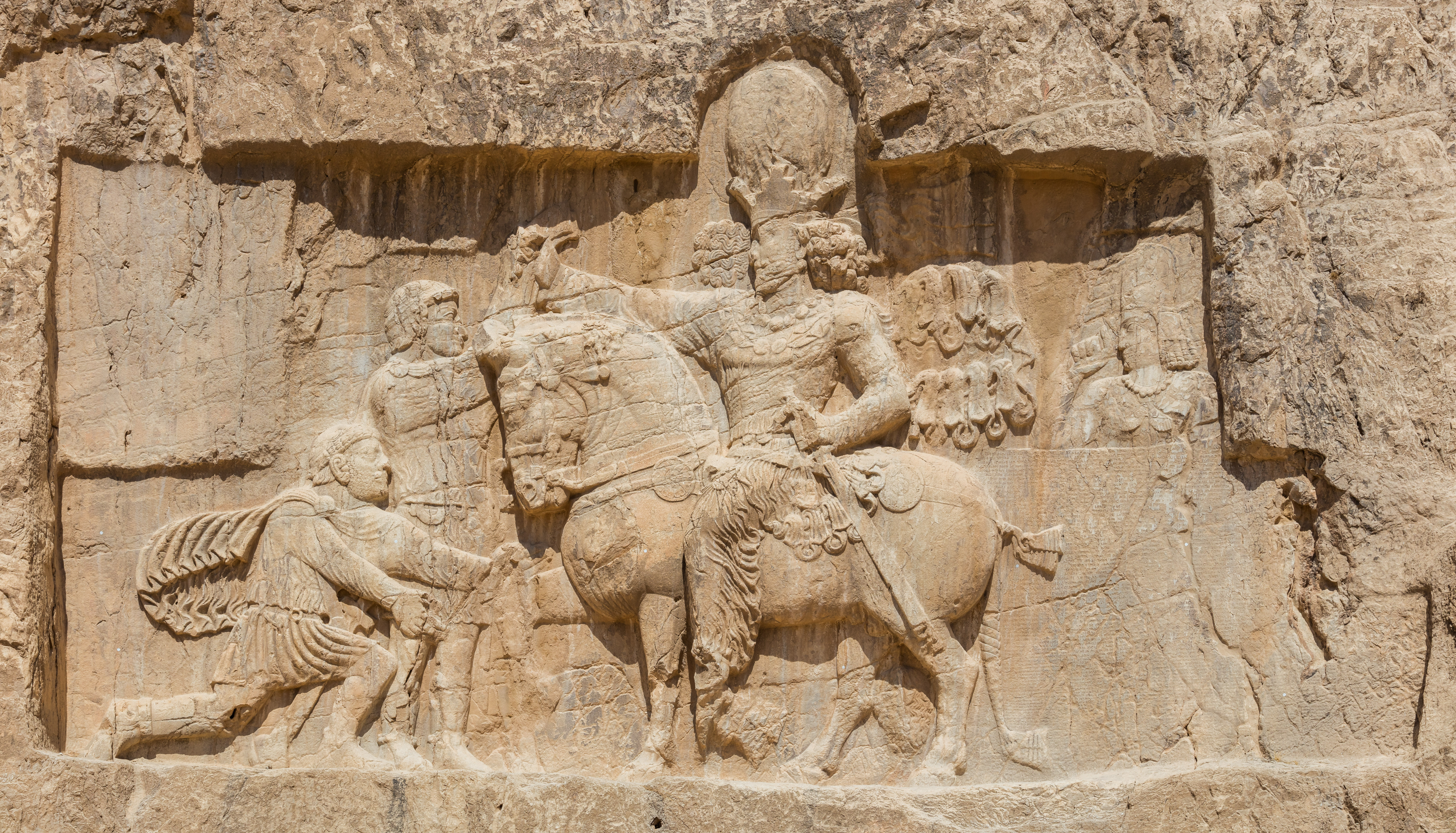
Triumph relief of Shapur I, depicted with floating, pleated deyhīm around his crown and ankles

The diadem or deyhīm (Persian: دیهیم). was a ribboned headband that functioned as a visible marker of royal authority in the Iranian world. In its basic form, a deyhīm consisted of a ribbon ending in a knot with two fringe strips, often wrapped around the head and allowed to drape down the back or shoulders. From the Parthian to the Sasanian periods, the deyhīm developed from a Hellenistic-derived insignia into a distinctively Iranian emblem of kingship and rank.

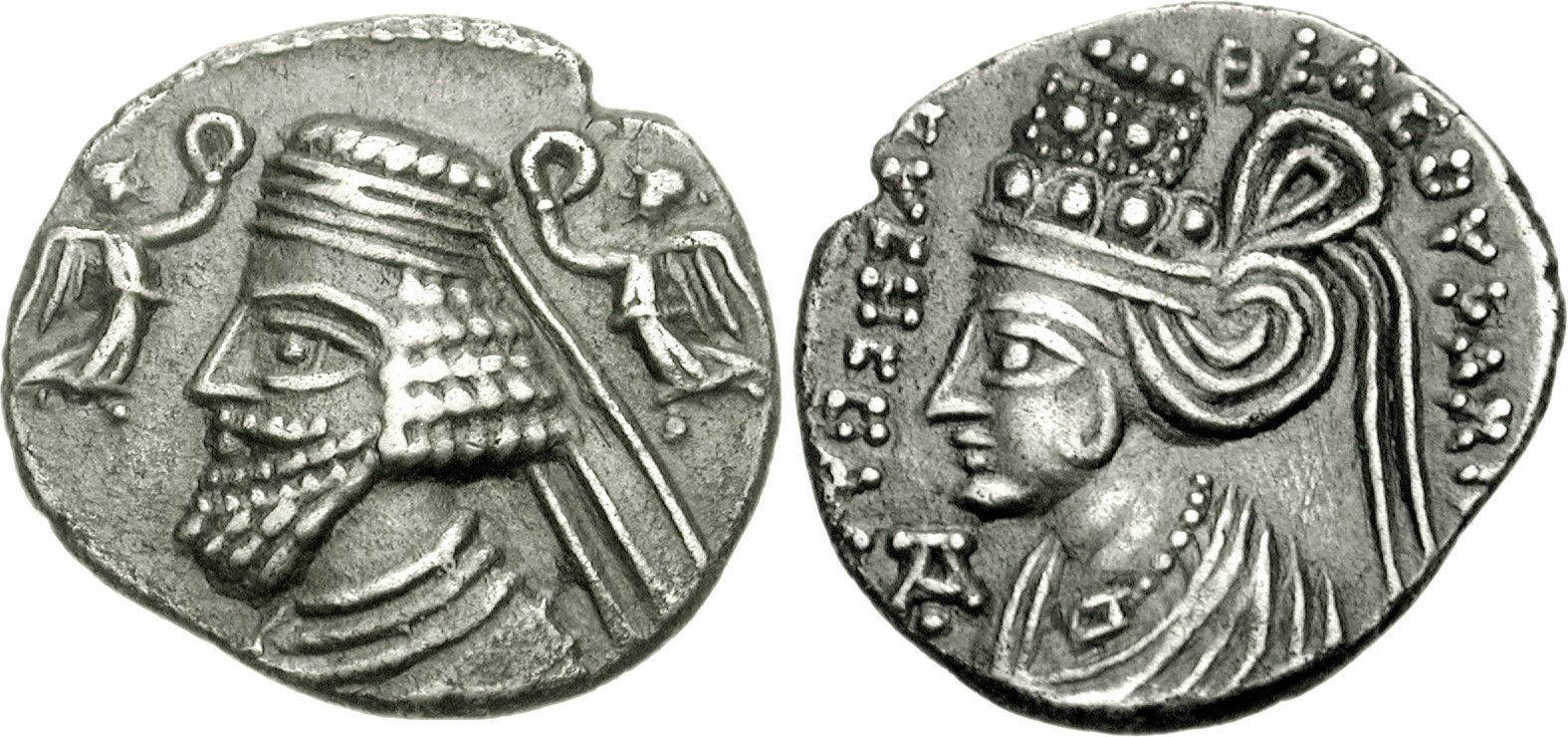
Parthian Shah Phraates V and queen Musa depicted with looped and simple multi-banded deyhīm

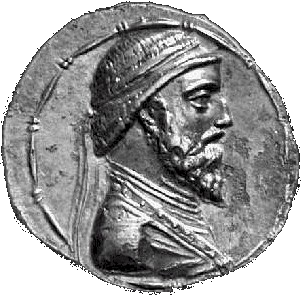
Artabanus II with a simple Hellenistic deyhīm

One of the essential outward signs of Arsacid royal power was the deyhīm, which served as a primary insignia of kingship. Early Parthian rulers adopted the Greek deyhīm as heirs to Seleucid traditions. Beginning with the reign of Phraates III, however, the Parthian deyhīm became distinct from its Hellenistic-inspired predecessors, marking a shift toward an independent Arsacid royal visual language. Over time, the Parthian deyhīm increased in complexity, consisting of multiple bands wrapped around the head and worn with longer ribbons. These longer ribbons were sometimes looped at the back of the head rather than hanging freely. In later Parthian representations, kings wore the multi-band deyhīm in conjunction with a curled topknot and globular bunches of hair over the ears, a configuration regarded as a precursor to later Sasanian royal hairstyles.

Under the Sasanians, the deyhīm with floating pleated ribbons became a constant element of royal crowns, typically shown flying outward at the sides. In contrast to Parthian practice, where floating ribbons were often attributed to divine figures, the Sasanian deyhīm firmly established such ribbons as markers of royal authority. Shorter ribbons in the Sasanian period signified lesser rank and could be beaded or jeweled, indicating hierarchical differentiation within the court. Ribbon symbolism extended beyond headgear, as Sasanian royal figures are also depicted wearing leggings or trousers gathered at the ankles and tied around the insteps with fluttering ribbons similar in form and function to the deyhīm, reinforcing their association with royal authority.

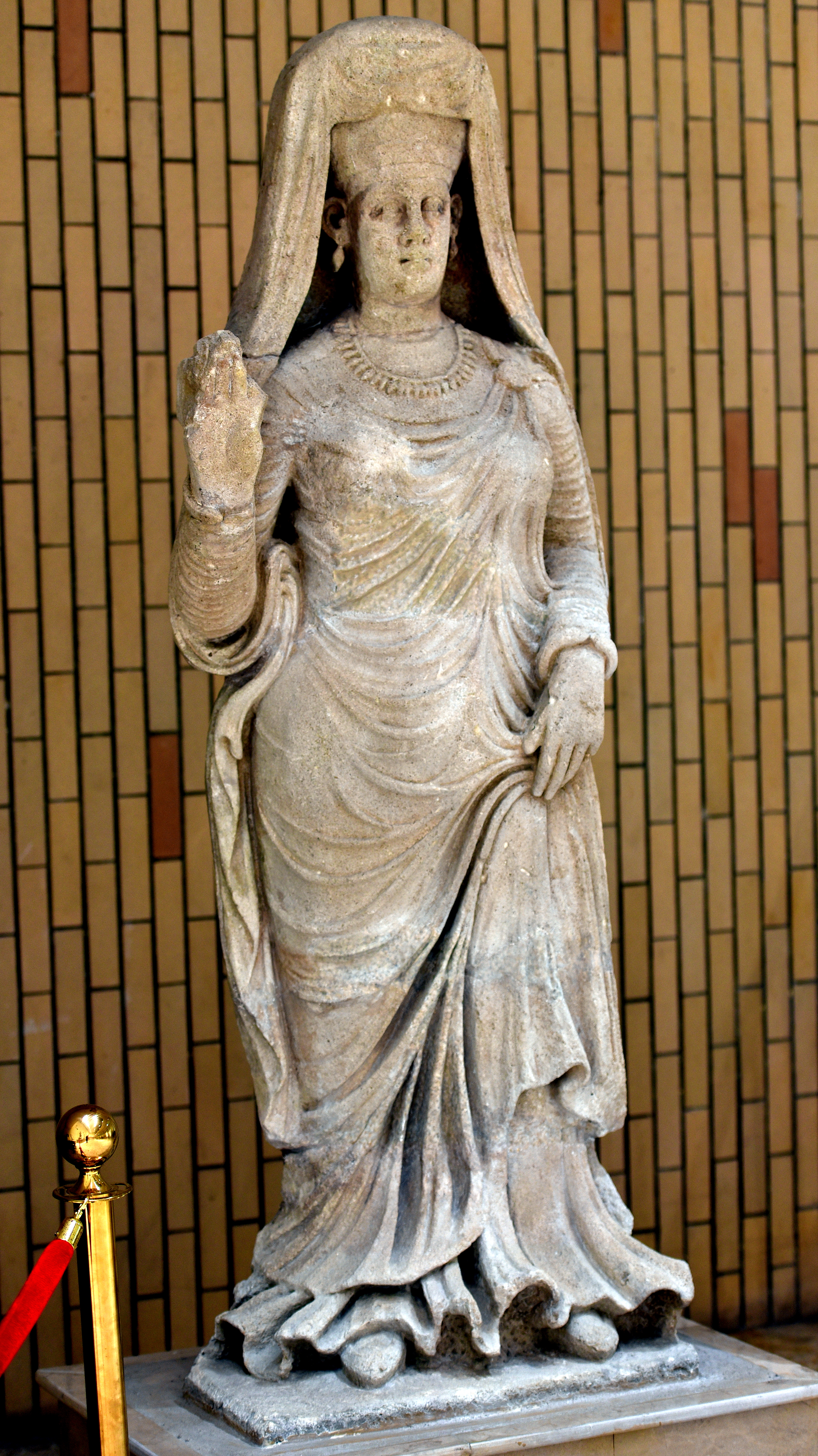
Example of women's headwear from the Arsacid period

Women's headwear included decorated headbands, turbans, caps, and more elaborate crowns. Thick decorated deyhīms were worn to hold the hair in position, while Arsacid women could also wear turbans or elaborate crowns beneath veils that descended over the shoulders and lower body. Sasanian women commonly wore the hair combed back from the forehead and temples and carried behind the shoulders in spiral curls or braids. One characteristic arrangement consisted of one or more thick plaits reaching from shoulder length to the small of the back, usually held in place by a deyhīm.

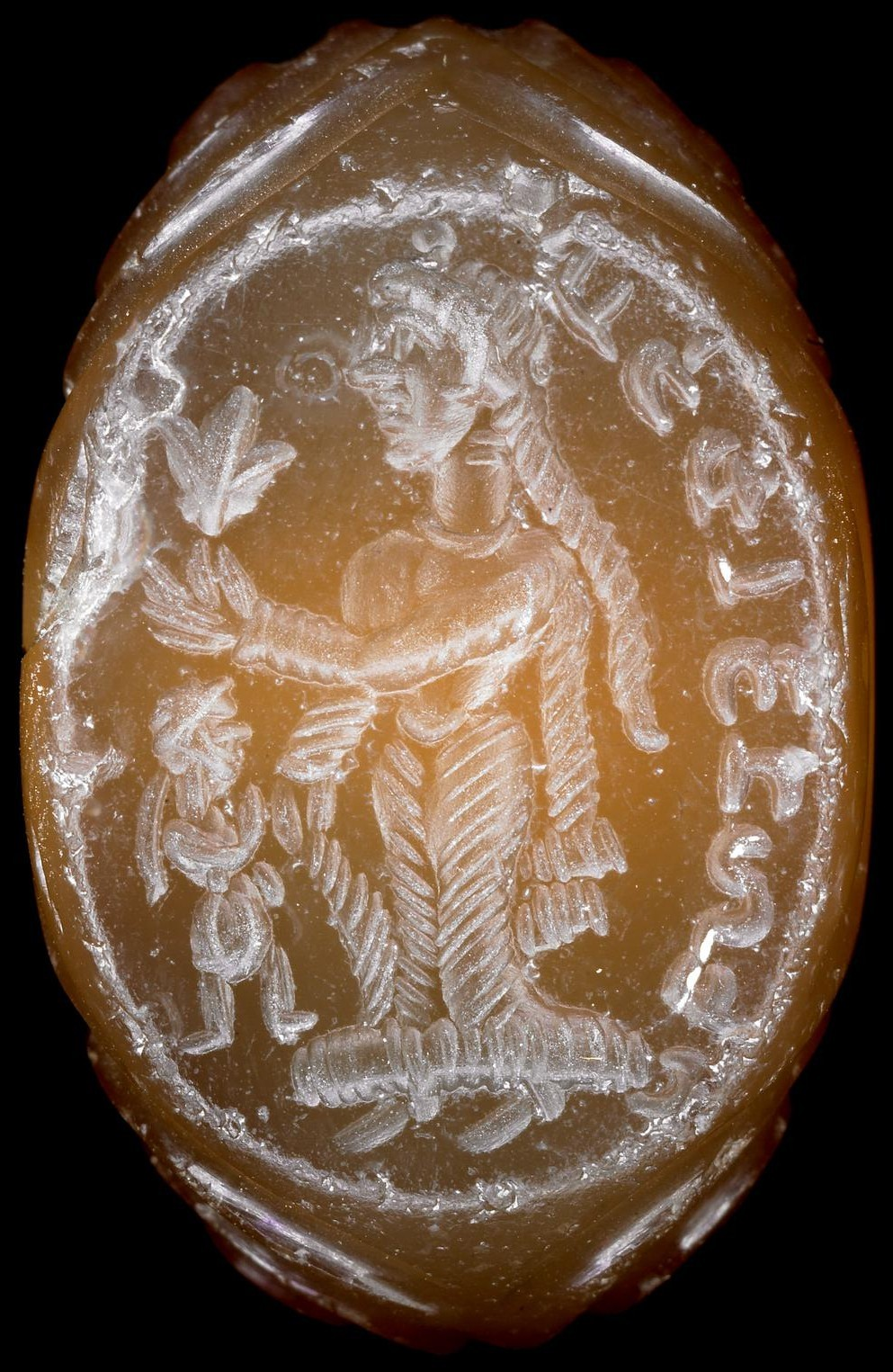
Goddess Daena in Sassanian costume depicted with multiple braids

The female harpists represented at Taq-e Bostan provide rare evidence for the head coverings of women below royal or divine rank. Two wear soft turbans, comparable in general form to those represented on third century Gandharan female musicians from Peshawar. Other harpists wear rectangular headdresses accompanied by broad pendant bands of cloth or ribbon decorated with repeating panels. Another rectangular type was constructed from two narrow bands joined at the back in a bow, with decorated ribbon ends hanging behind. Comparable hats with long ornamented ribbons appear on sixth and seventh century female donors in the wall paintings at Ming Öi near Qïzïl in Chinese Turkestan.

=== Paymog ===
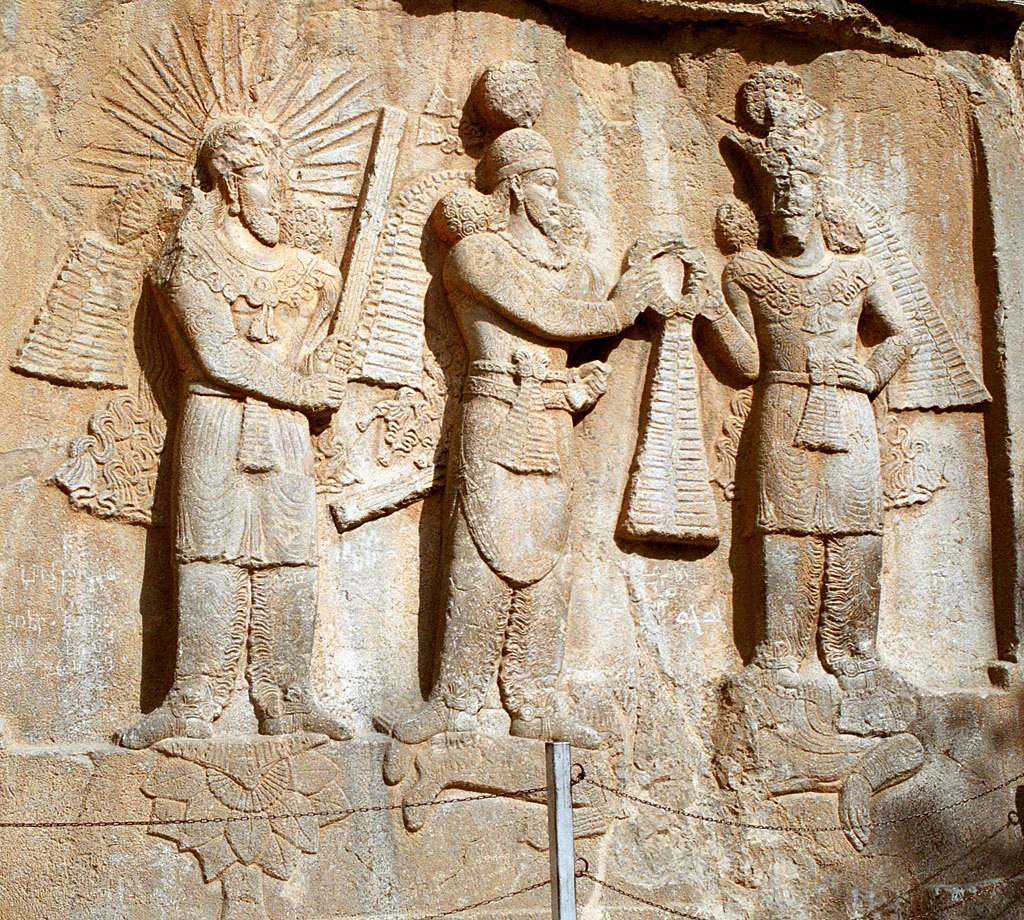
Taq-e Bostan investiture depicting several variants of ǰāmag with deyhīm and cloaks

Upper garments worn in the Sasanian period, broadly referred to as paymōg (Middle persian: ptmwg) formed part of a broader category of clothing encompassing tunics, coats, and cloaks worn over trousers. These garments were constructed in layered systems and shared decorative conventions including patterned triple circles, stippled triangles, and trellis designs. Clothes were also trimmed with beads and square gems and strewn with ovoid gems dangling from smaller beads and disks, as well as gold settings and pearls. The principal forms of paymōg were the tunics, coats, qabā and cloaks.

The ǰāmag (Middle Persian: yʾmk) was a short tunic worn over trousers, fastened with a ribbon belt secured by round clasps . It became standard royal attire under Shapur I and appears consistently in early Sasanian reliefs and sculpture. The ǰāmag exhibited several structural variants. By the late fourth century, one form gathered the hem at the sides with rings and ribbons, producing a rounded apron like panel at the front. Other variants included tunics with decorated folded hems at the sides and front, and constructions employing semicircular lower hems formed from large front and back panels with quarter circle extensions. These variations reflect both chronological development and rank differentiation within the court.

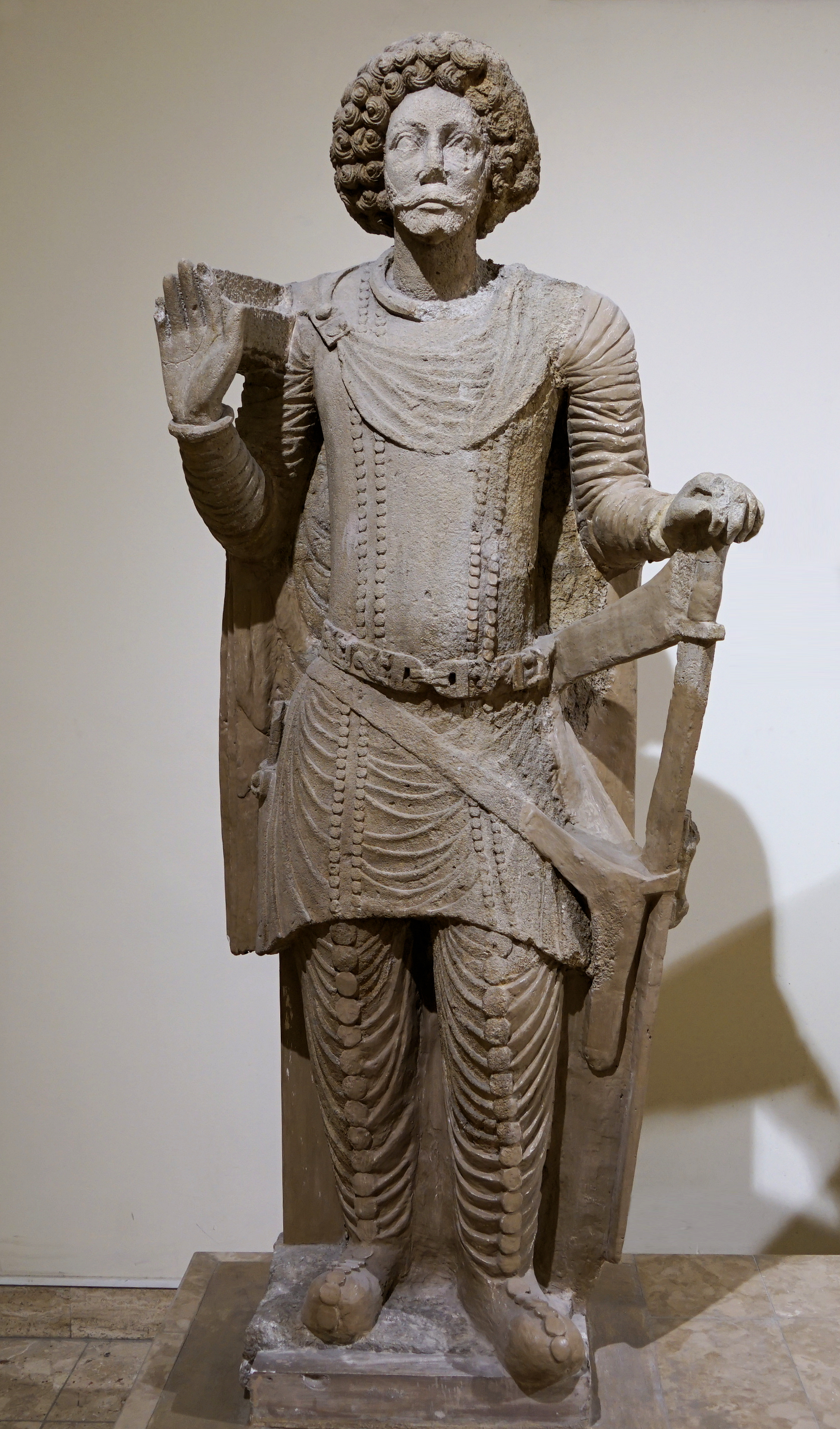
Example of Arsacid jamāg with a cloak and curved hem

The Parthian Jamāg was sleeved, loose-belted at the waist and covered with horizontal folds. It was worn by both royal and non royal figures and could be worn either by itself or beneath a qabā . The garment was patterned with diamond shaped designs and ornamented with bands, embroidery, or woven decoration at the wrists and neckline. One to three ornamental strips often ran vertically down the front of the tunic. In some Parthian examples, the hem of the jamāg was shaped in a semicircular form rather than falling straight.

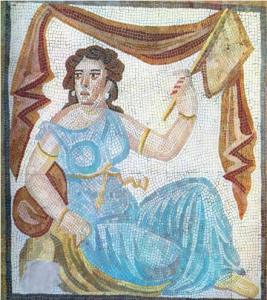
Mosaic depicting a Sassanian woman wearing a sleeveless Jamāg girdled below the breast

In the Arsacid period women's Jamāg was a long, full garment reaching the ankles in fine pleats and was distinguished from the corresponding male tunic chiefly by its greater length. It could have long sleeves or be sleeveless and was worn either loose or girded below the breasts, a form thought to derive from the Greek chiton. During the Arsacid period a sleeveless rū-pirāhani, or over tunic, also appears worn over the jamāg. In Sasanian representations the basic robe remained a full length shift or gown with long sleeves, sometimes finished with decorative cuffs, usually cinched immediately below the breasts and cut from light fabric so that it fell loosely beneath the belt. Some examples carried roundels enclosing dotted rosettes on the shoulders, a decorative feature more commonly associated with earlier male garments.

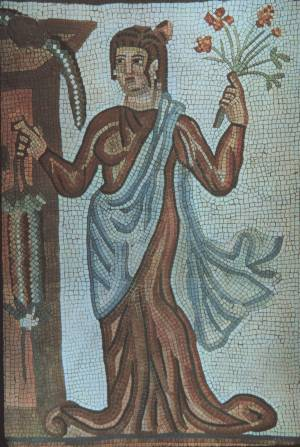
Example of a Sassanian woman from Bishapur wearing a mantle draped over her shoulder

A related mantle could be wrapped once around the torso over the sleeved shift and carried over one shoulder. It could then be brought upward around one arm, held by one corner in the hand, or secured around the body with a waistband. In Arsacid dress one end of the mantle could also be drawn over the head as a veil, and the same use of the mantle as a head covering continued among Sasanian women.

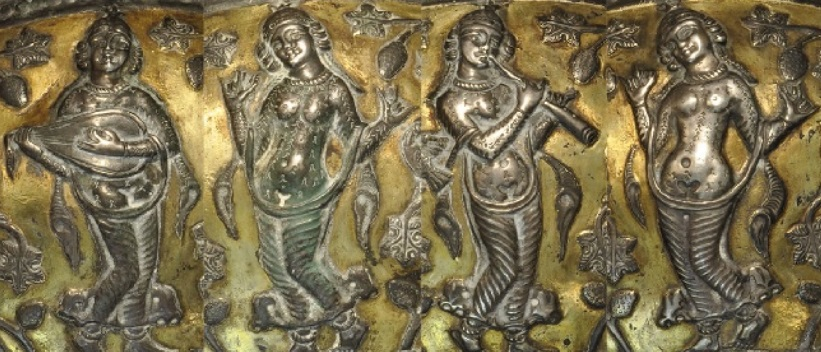
Dancers and musicians on a Sassanian bowl depicted with their mantles dropped below the hips

The veil formed an important part of women's dress in both the Arsacid and Sassanian periods and could be wrapped around the body or allowed to fall freely behind the head. One form was worn over the sleeved tunic, draped around the lower body and passed over the left shoulder, and may have descended from the Greek himation. It could either be fastened at the shoulder or pulled over the head. In other variants the veil was draped below the hips, with its ends wrapped around the arms, exposing a close fitting, diaphanous, belted tunic with long sleeves that could be patterned with circles or groups of three dots. This arrangement could be traced to second and third century costume of the eastern Mediterranean while the tunic and veil combination can be dressing associated particularly with noblewomen, court musicians and dancers.

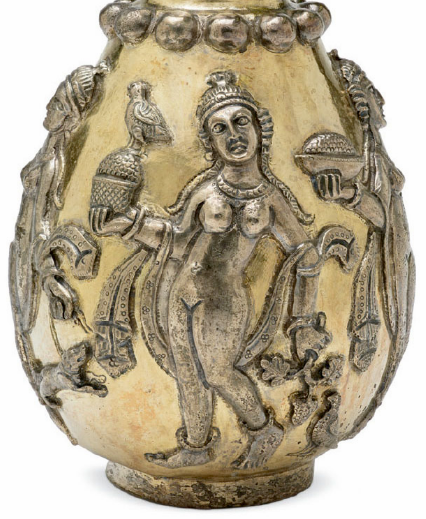
Dancer with a flowing veil, reminiscent of Buddhist celestial imagery

Female dancers were depicted holding their scarves in both hands so that they formed a narrow arc above the head, following the Greco-Roman convention of windblown shawls arranged in a crescent shape. In other variations, the scarf fell behind or in front of the body, forming a thin U-shaped arc. These Sasanian scarf motifs, themselves derived from the Greco-Roman tradition of the windblown shawl, helped shape the floating-scarf imagery of Central Asian Buddhist art, particularly depictions of apsaras and other celestial figures. Through Buddhist art, the motif then traveled to China, where the long, thin floating scarf became closely associated with deities and developed into a symbol of divinity and ethereal grace. Over time, the scarf also entered everyday Chinese women’s fashion, developing during the Tang and Five Dynasties into garments known as the pibo or peibo.

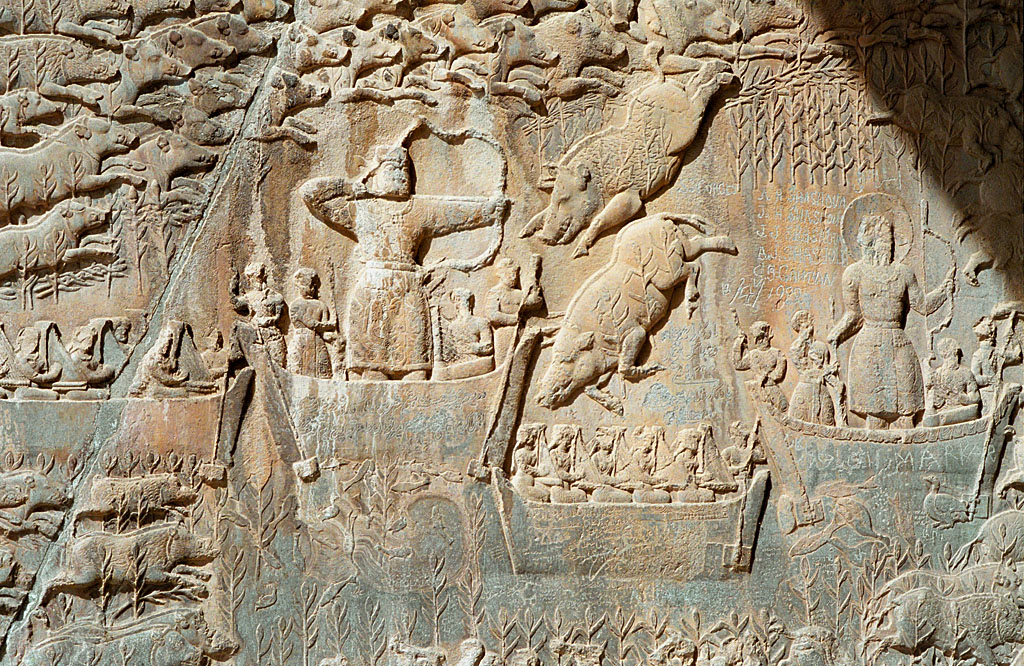
Taq-e Bostan boar hunt scene depicting figures wearing the late Sassanian kaftān

The kabāh (Middle Persian: kpʾh ) was a long sleeved coat descended from the Median kandys. It was worn over the Jāmag with trousers and fastened at the waist. The earliest known depiction of the kabāh appears in the Babak graffiti at Persepolis, where the coat is tied at the breast with ribbons and ornamented with radial medallions at the shoulders, A common variant was a lighter coat worn open over a long tunic and leggings, fastened at the breast with circular clasps or ribbons, as seen in reliefs of Shapur I and Bahram II. A further development of the kabāh is the Sasanian kaftān, a front opening garment constructed as a single piece split vertically, with overlapping panels left open at the front and belted at the waist. These coats often employed a four gore arrangement and were ornamented at the waist or with additional fabric. High collars with central fastenings, long fitted sleeves, and embroidered and jeweled cuffs are characteristic features, made of heavy materials with dipping and pointed hems. The kabāh appears exceptionally in representations of Sasanian women and seems to have functioned primarily as a luxury garment associated with noblewomen and goddesses represented in aristocratic dress. Its manner of wear differed from that of male courtiers. Men placed their arms through the sleeves, whereas women could drape the coat over the shoulders like a cape and leave the sleeves hanging freely.

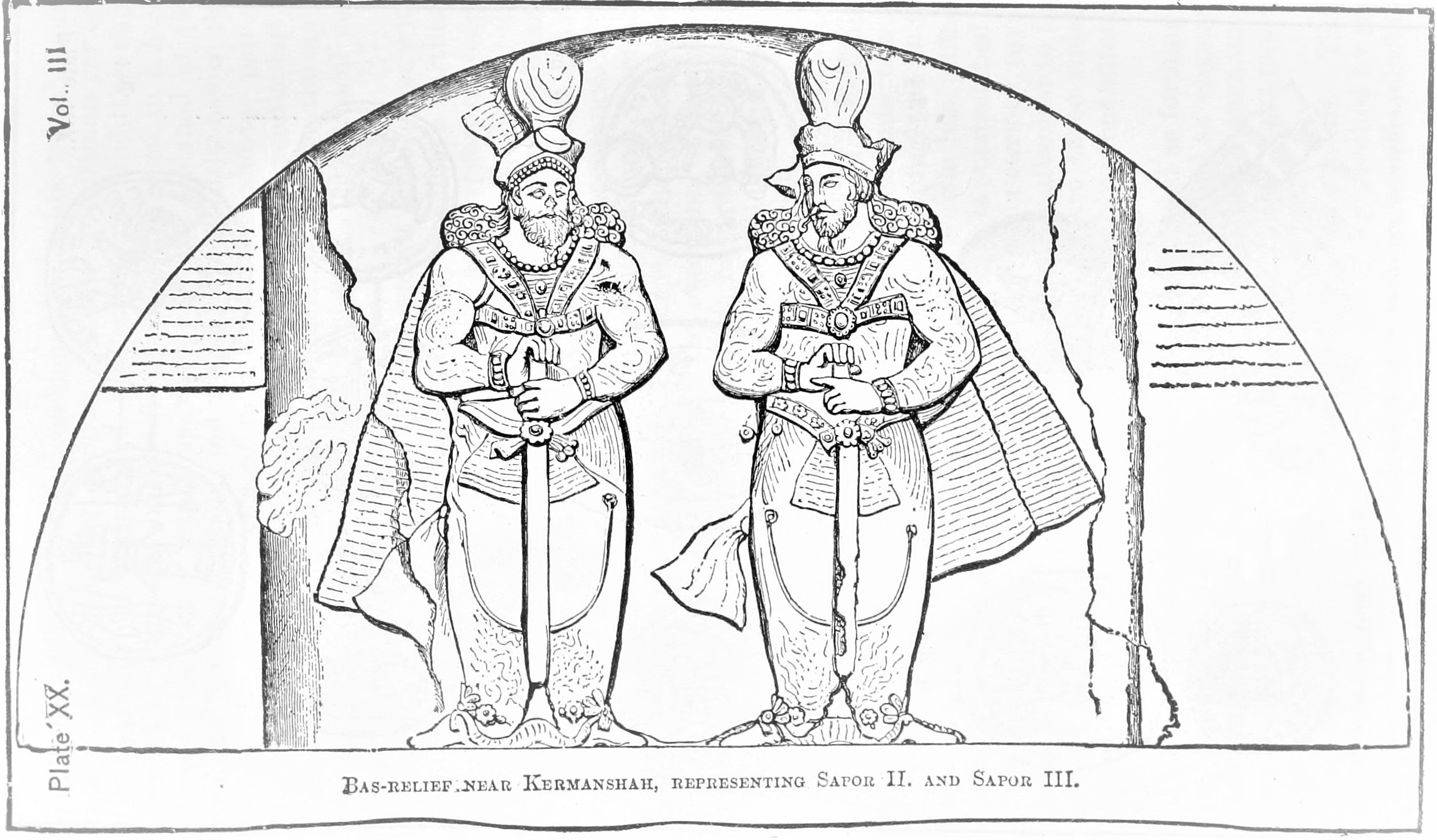
Shapur II and Shapur III in royal attire

Another staple of Sassanian and Parthian garment was a light cloak secured at the front with short ribbons and clasps at the breasts, and was closely associated with power and authority. It may derive from the Greek himation, though an alternative origin has been proposed in Parthian Elymais, where longer and more elaborately ornamented cloaks fastened at the front with elaborate clasps are attested. In the early Sasanian period, the royal cloak was worn together with a broad jeweled collar interpreted as a chain of office, sometimes composed of flat jewels or disks similar to Parthian neck ornaments. From the reign of Shapur I onward, this chain of office was replaced by necklaces of round gems or pearls, which became a mark of royalty until the end of the dynasty, and the cloak was fastened with deyhīm ribbons. From the fifth century onward, the necklace could be replaced by a heavy collar with two rows of beads and a central pendant.

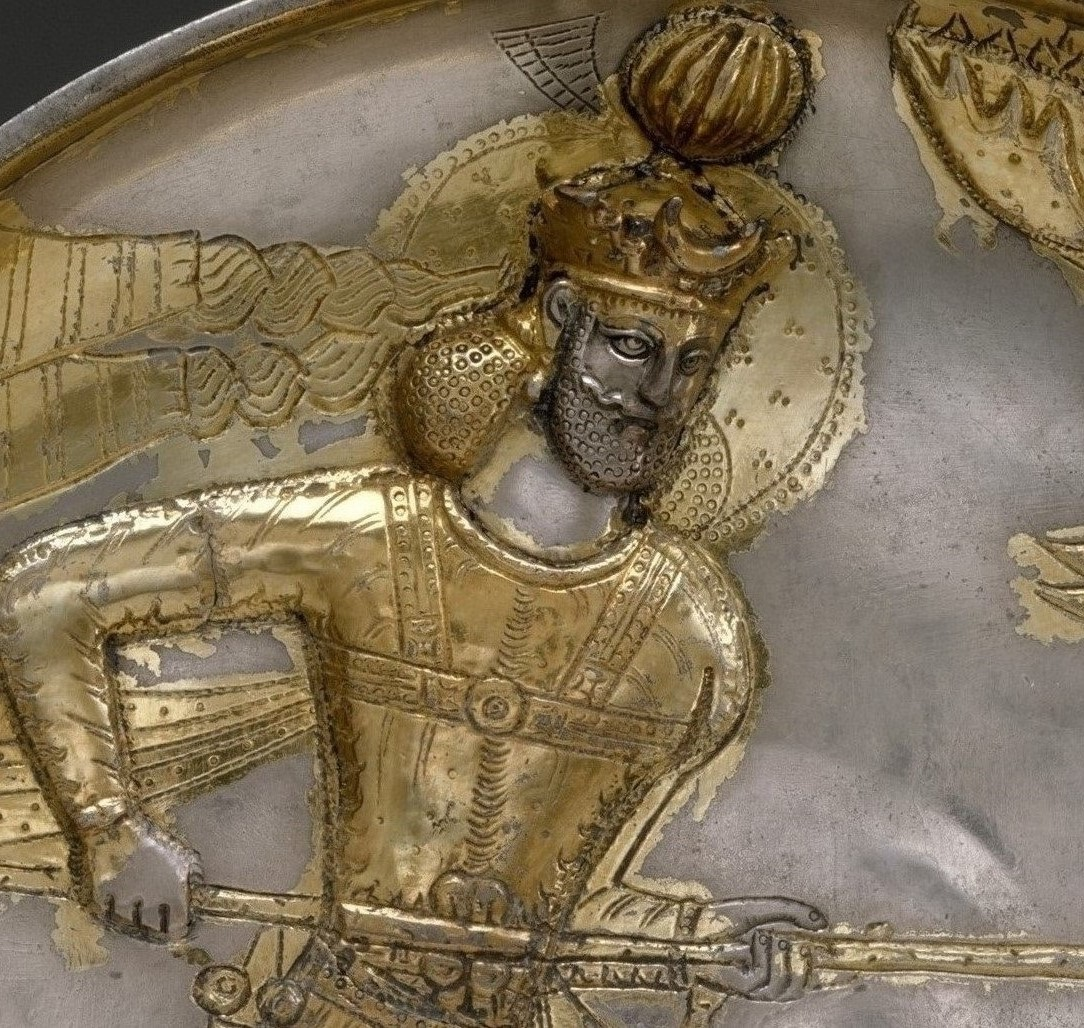
Example of Sasanian chest harness

The harness was the most important symbol of royalty and consisted of a set of bands worn on the upper torso. It was composed of diagonal shoulder straps attached to a horizontal strap encircling the upper chest, with the junction at the front marked by a central boss or rosette that served as a mark of high rank. The straps could be beaded or banded and were tied at the back with two long ribbons ending in jewels or bells, a feature consistently represented in Sasanian royal imagery. On the two earliest rock reliefs of Ardeshir I, the king is shown wearing crossed bands with a central boss, indicating the early canonical form of the harness.

The qabā in the Sasanian period took the form of a tunic with a diagonal closing edged with beads. This style, worn with or without an inner shirt, had earlier been used in Parthian and Kushan contexts. Despite its earlier prevalence, the diagonally closing qabā never became truly popular in Sasanian dress and appears only sporadically in Sasanian visual material. In the Arsacid period, the qabā was similarly sleeved and closed at the front, typically short and hip length and wrapped diagonally across the chest. It was particularly suited for activities such as hunting and horseback riding. A variant of the Arsacid qabā extended to knee length and was worn open at the chest front to reveal the tunic worn beneath. Jewelry accompanied these garments according to status and context. Dancers and other women of lower rank are represented without the beaded necklaces characteristic of higher status figures and instead wear heavy collars carrying single, double, or triple pendants.

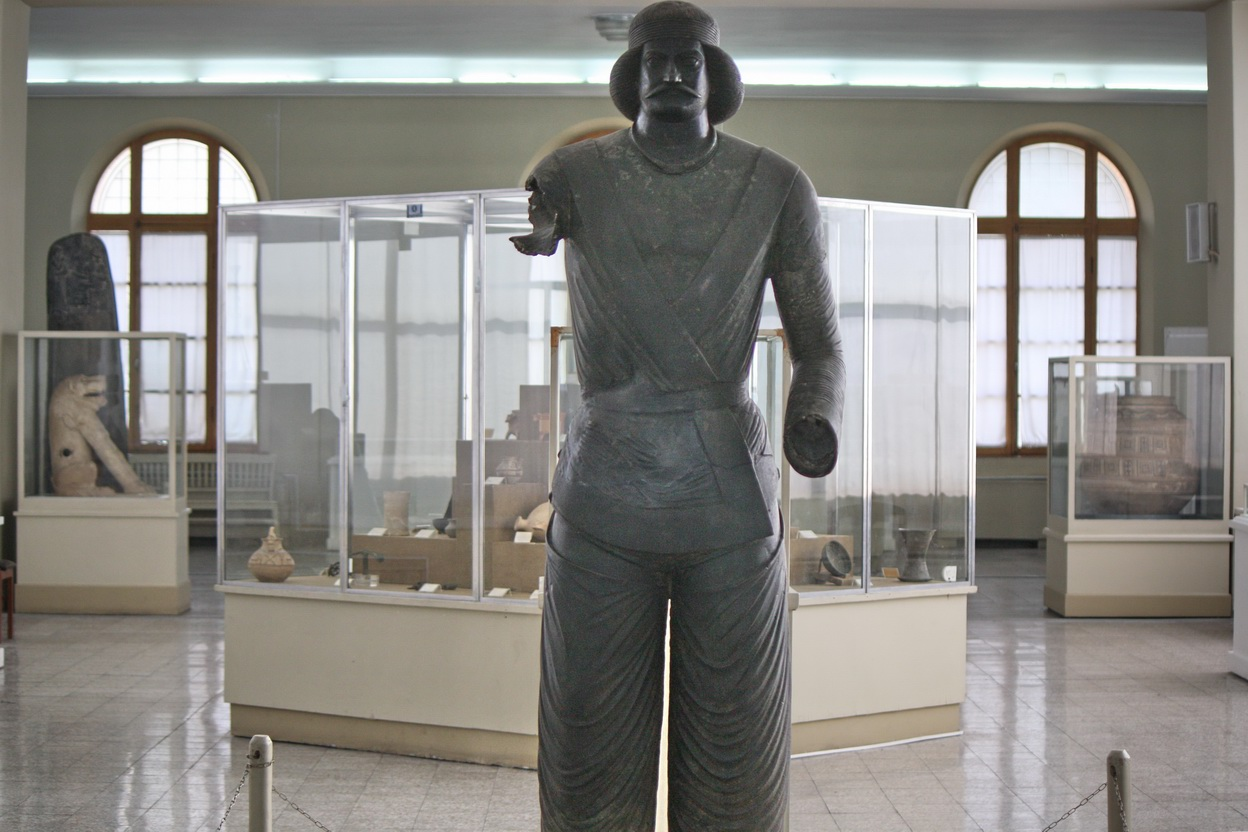
Statue depicted with Parthian qabā

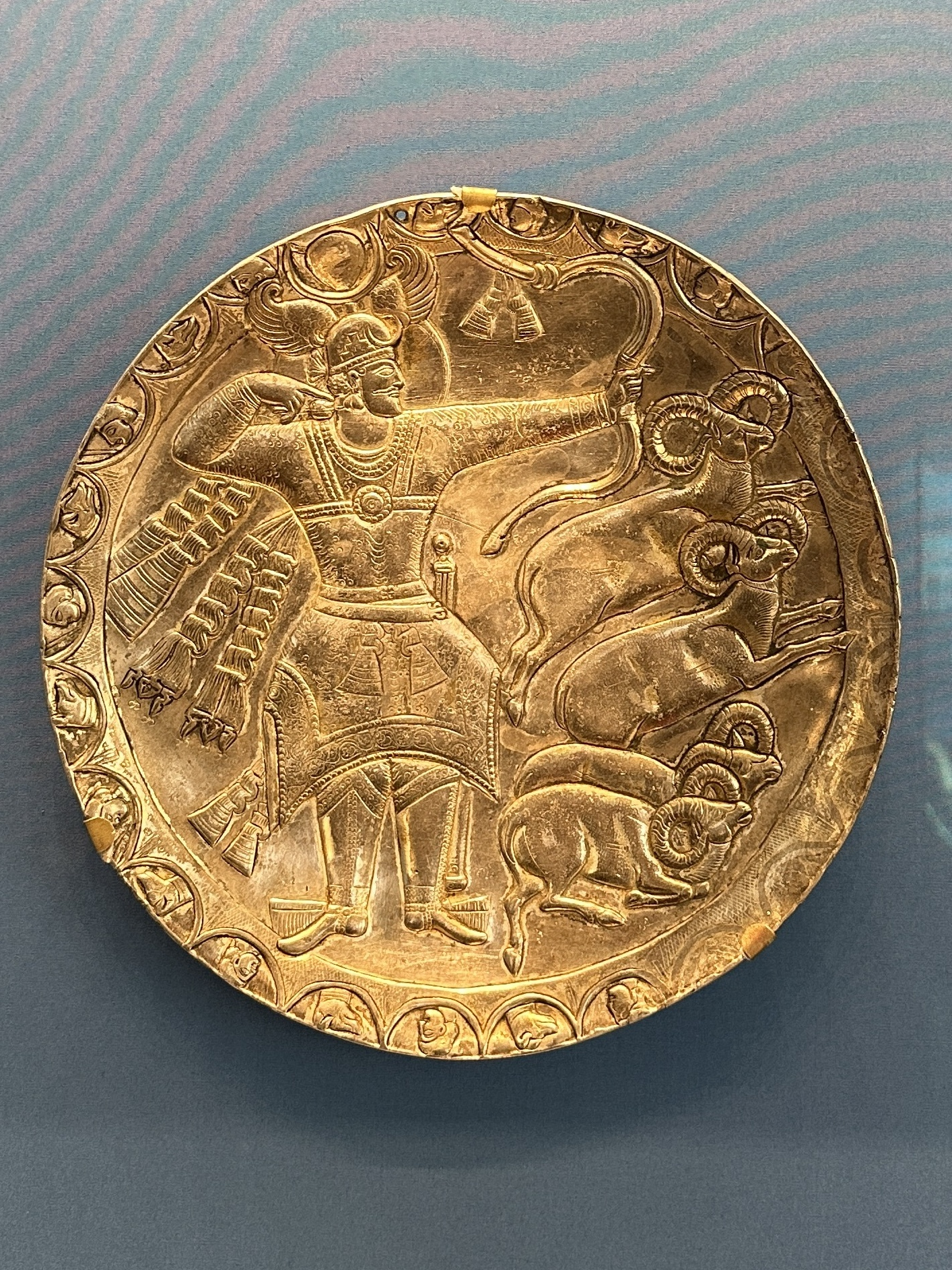
Sassanian plate depicting figure wearing a jamāg with a curved hem

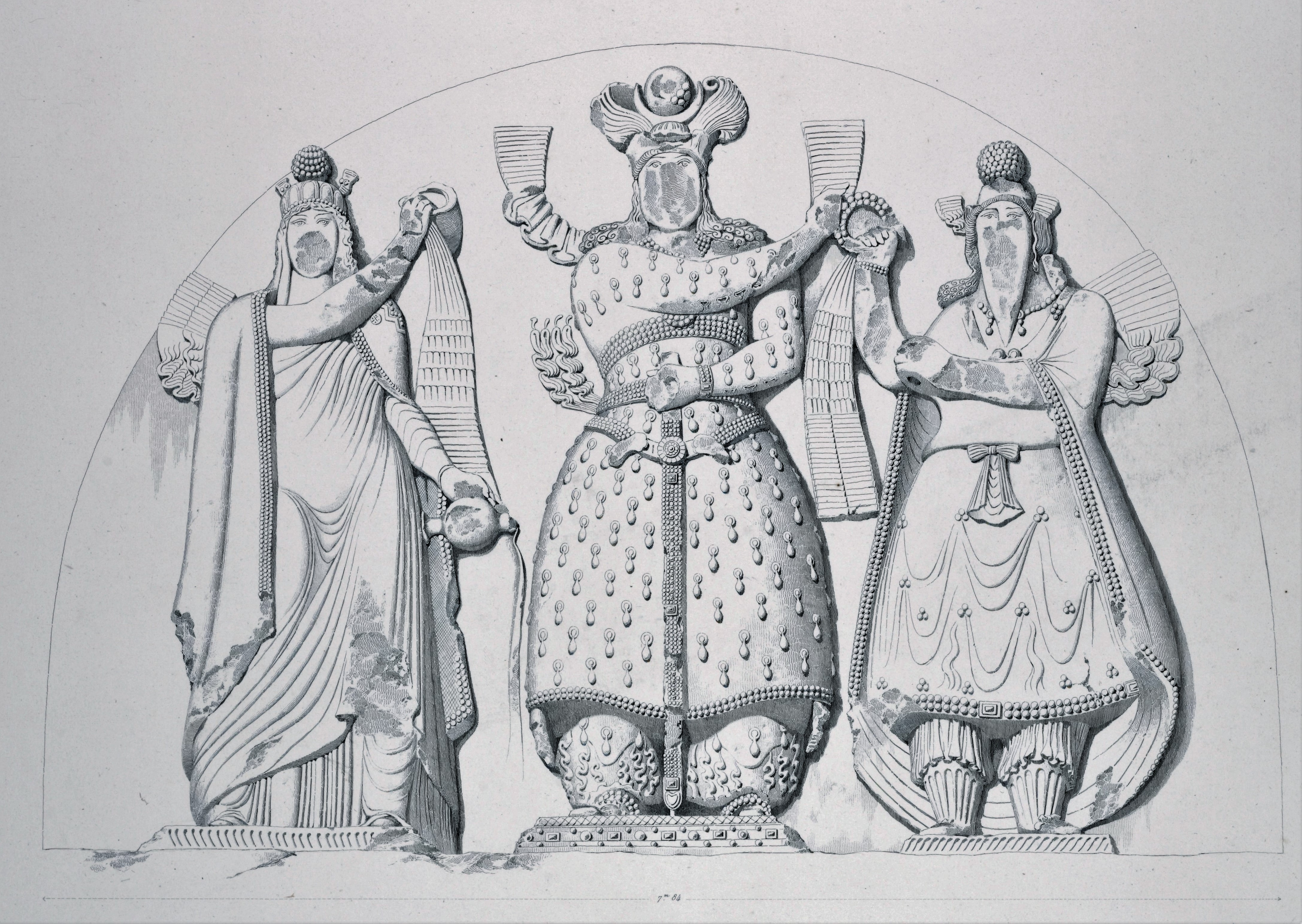
Investiture of Anushirvan depicting Sassanian dress decorations

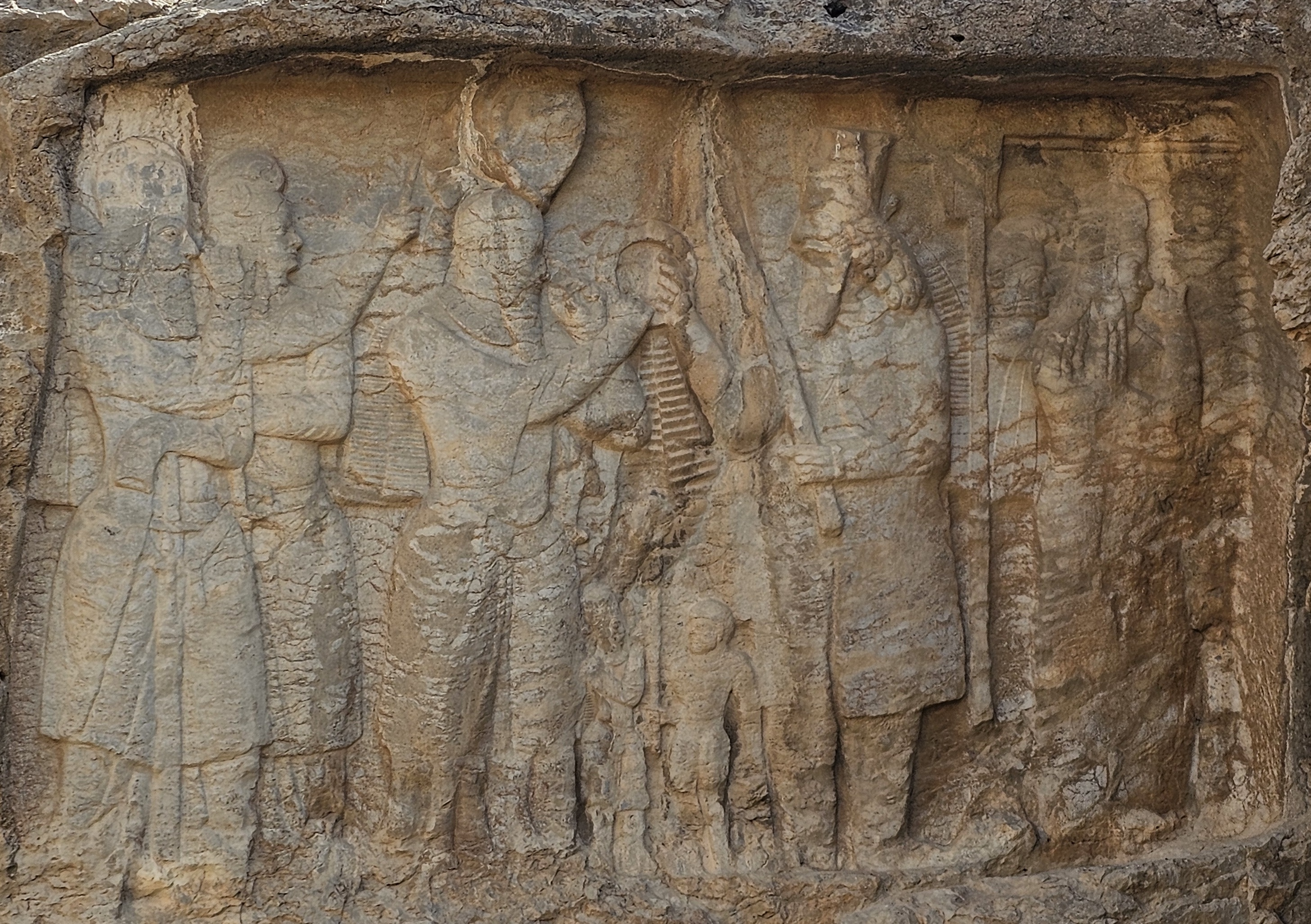
Coronation of Ardeshir I, figures depicted with kabāh

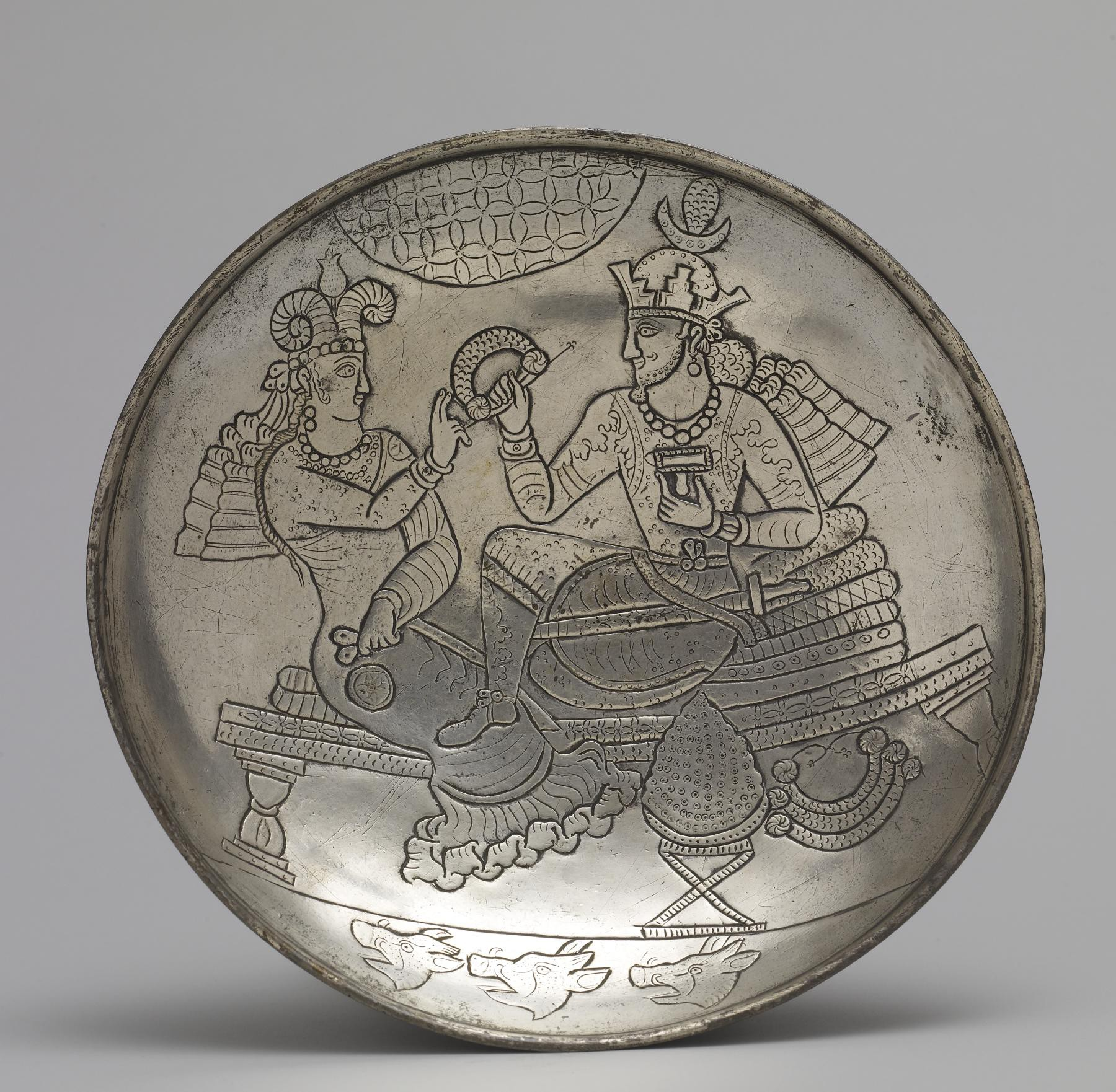
Sassanian jamāg (right) with decorated shoulder medallions and apron hem

Crown of Shapur I with ending in an eagle's head

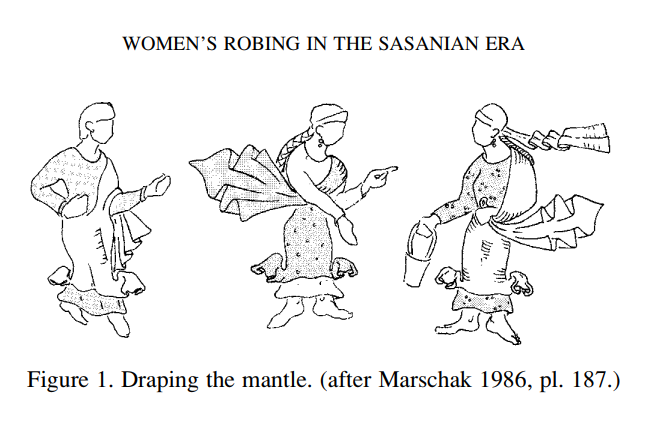
Variations of Sassanian women's mantles

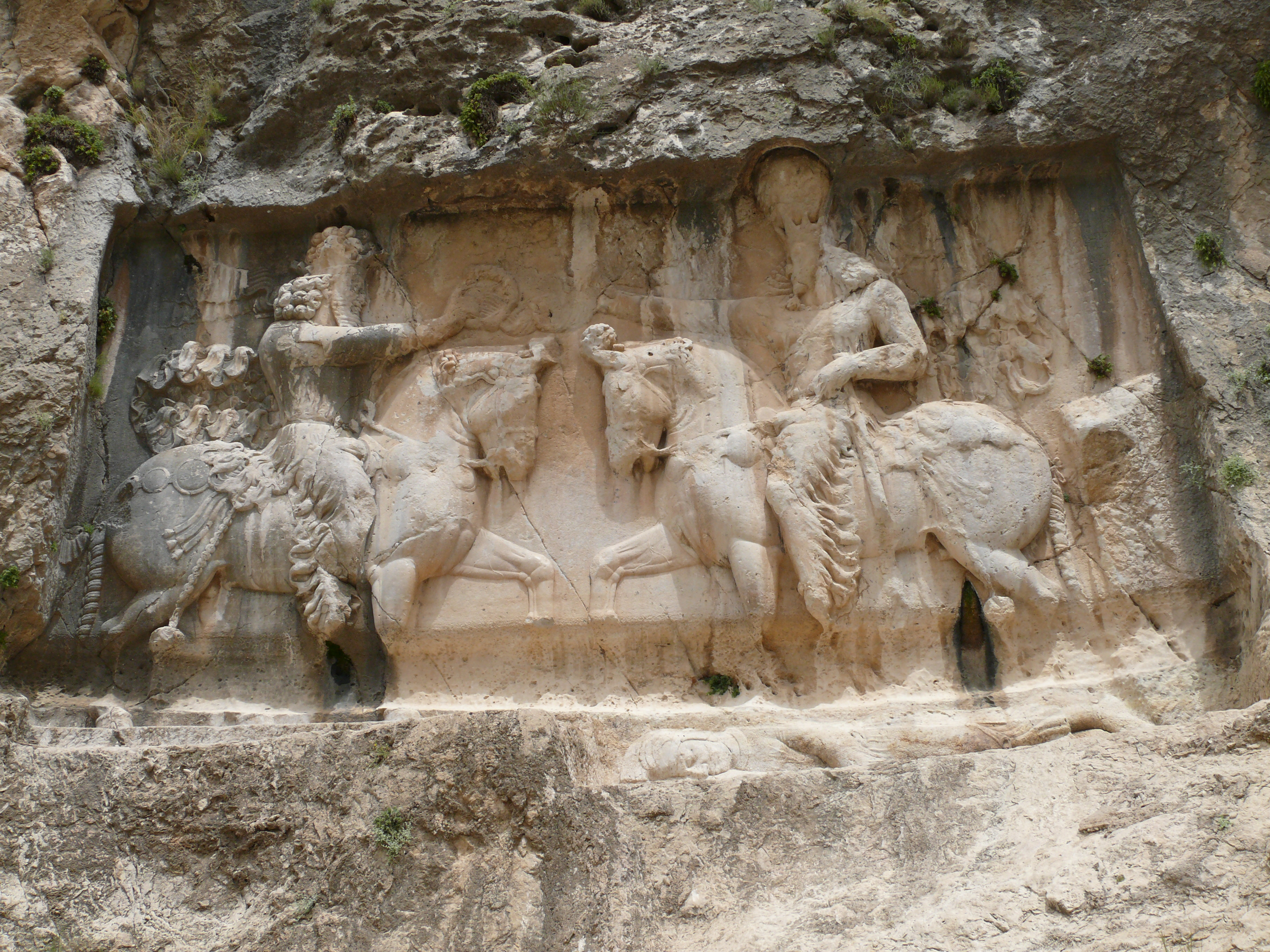
Investiture of Bahram I depicting Sassanian cloaks

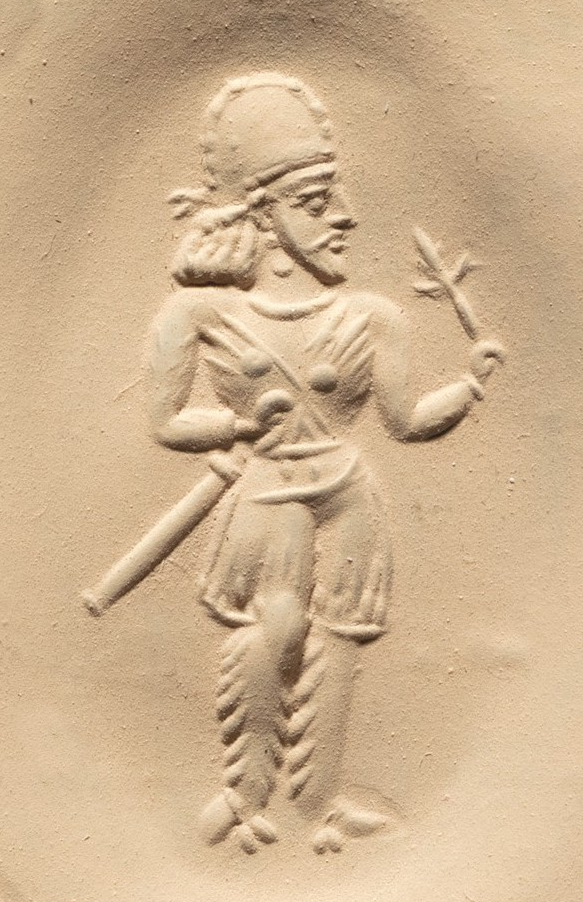
Example of Sassanid qabā

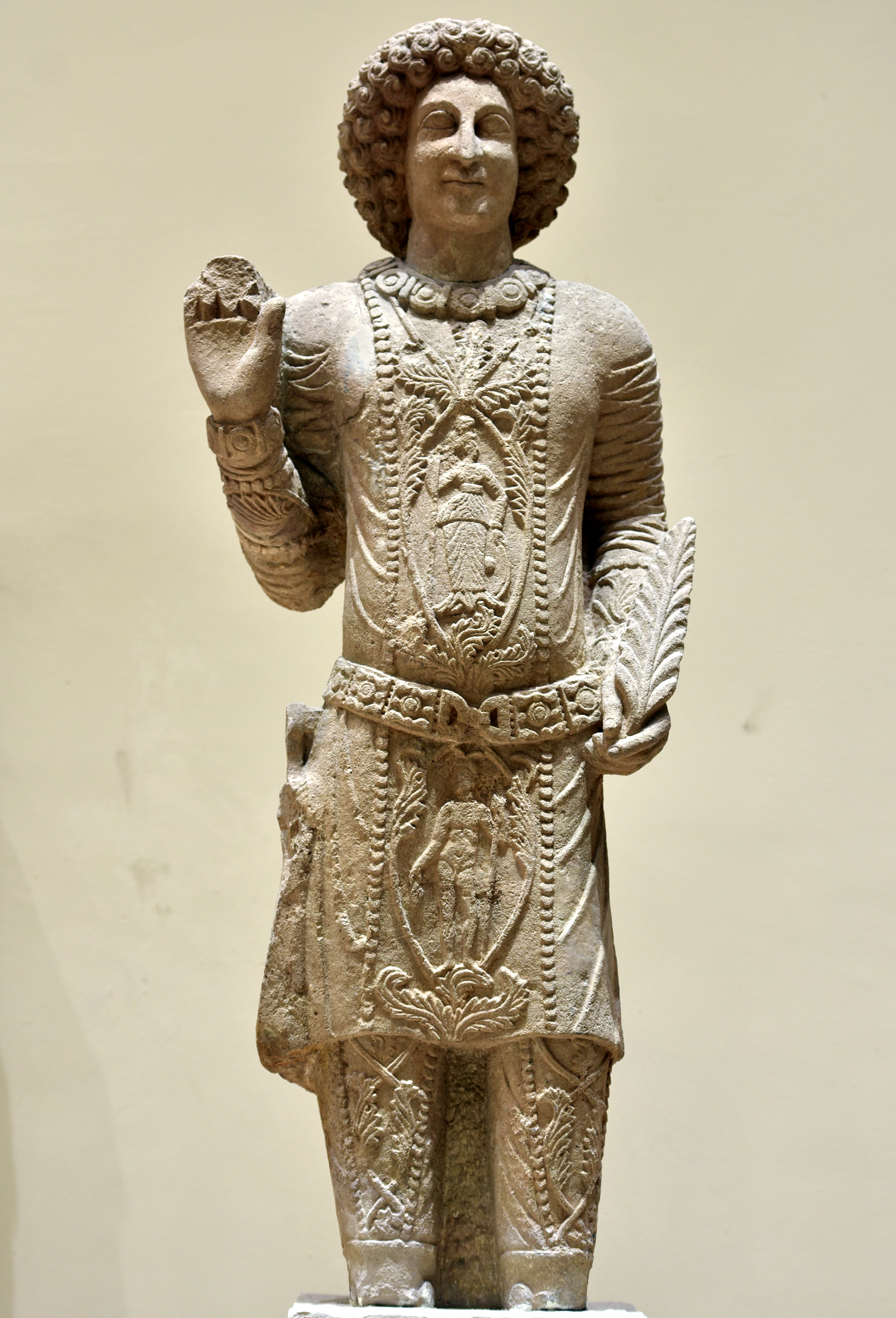
A variant of Arsacid period Jamāg

== Medieval period ==
=== From the Arab invasion until the Seljuk conquest ===
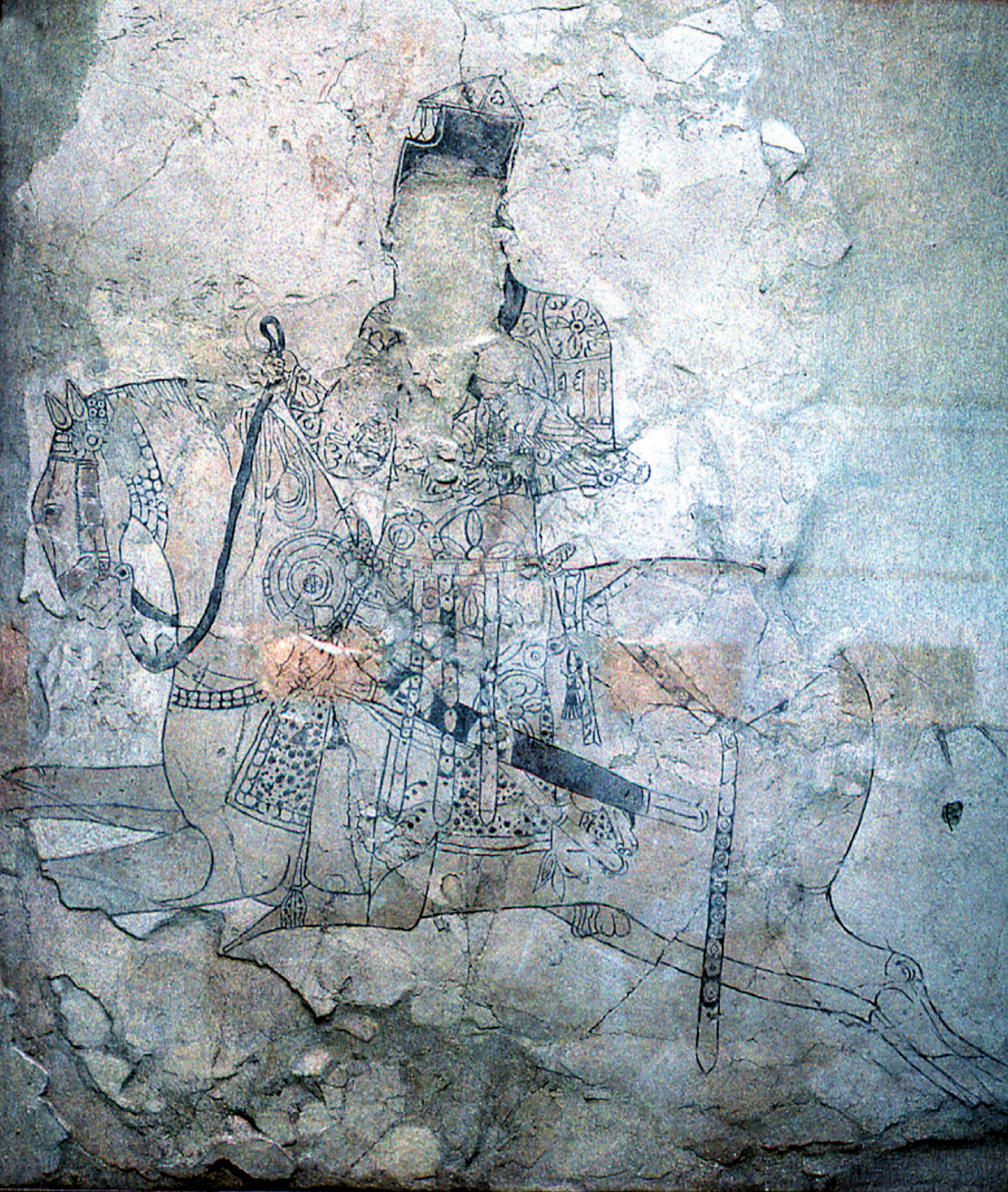
A Samanid falconer from 10th century Nishapur - example of belt with lappets

The ninth and tenth-century Iranian costume, particularly during the Iranian Intermezzo, consisted primarily of decorated kaftans with stiff skirts and long, tight sleeves. They were girdled at the waist with belts, featuring three long, metal-tipped lappets from which swords were suspended. The kaftans were worn with ornamented shalvars (a distinctly nomadic article of clothing descended from Achaemenid, Arsacid, and Sasanian costume) tucked into high, pointed-toe boots, possibly of Central Asian origin. These kaftans functioned as khil'at and were distinguished by tiraz brassards inscribed with pseudo-Kufic inscription of the sultan or caliph's titles, with plain early variants originating in pre-Islamic Iran. Silk and quilted raw silk could be used as lining material in earlier kaftans during winter, while later Buyid tunics were made of softer material. Samanid kaftans closed diagonally from left to right and had lapels, while some examples of buff ware from Nishapur depict wing-like sleeve attachments terminating in narrow points. A variant of the kaftan introduced by the Buyids closed from the right side, leaving the garment more open at the front and below the waist, and was worn with looser shalvars that covered the heels. In the Ghaznavid court, the kaftan remained popular and could have lapels only on the right side of the opening, although examples of double-lapelled kaftans were still present during this period.

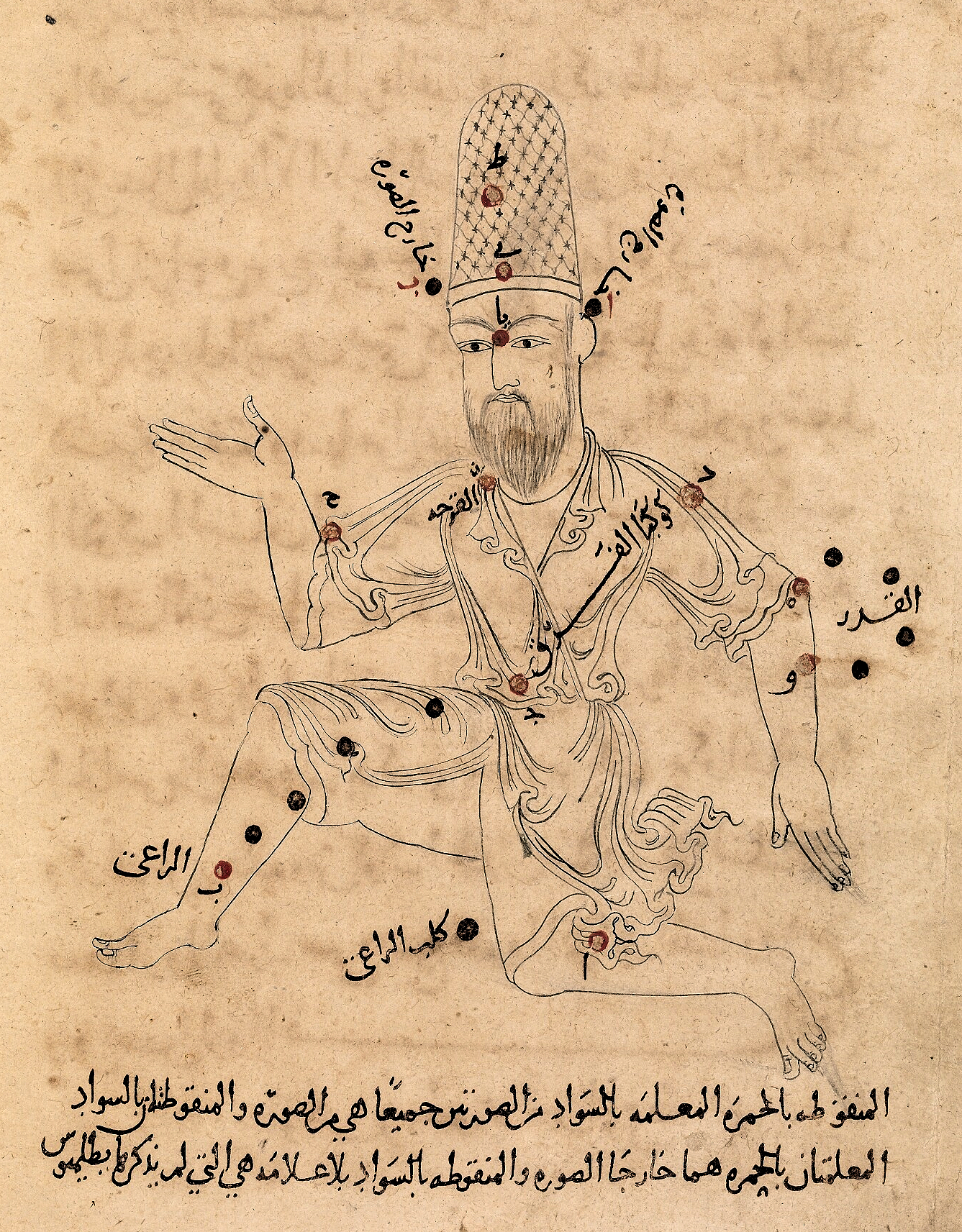
Representation of the qalansuwa

In the early Islamic period, the Sasanian kulāf, a rounded cap with a beaded brim and ribbons tied to the sides, continued to be used, particularly in the Abbasid Caliphate, but it later gave way to the turban, which was wrapped around a conical cap in the shape of an onion. In the Buyid period, the turban was soft and round and sat squarely on the head with a flat silhouette. Simultaneously, the qalansuwa, a tall hat rounded at the top and covered with lattice patterns, became popular with the Buyids, having originated as the official headgear of Umayyad and early Abbasid caliphs, with possible descent from Achaemenid or Sasanian headgear. The royal association of the qalansuwa gradually diminished, and it was worn by individuals of non-Muslim and non-royal status as late as the fourteenth and fifteenth centuries, with shorter variants often wrapped in a turban.

Women's costume shared its basic structure with male dress, consisting of long-sleeved, hip-length kaftans worn with long skirts and soft shoes. The tunics were girdled at the hips with two strands of beads, while scarves were draped over the arms and across the front. Samanid women's kaftans were fastened diagonally from right to left, girdled with heavy belts, and worn with simple undergarments, while in Buyid depictions their coats usually lack the lapels of their male counterparts and feature short, scalloped sleeves and hems over ankle-length dresses. Decorated trousers were sometimes worn underneath as well. Women's jewelry and golden diadems were similar in style to those of Sasanian court dancers. They also wore rounded caps and strands of pearls in their hair, which was arranged in long plaits, with additional pearl drops suspended from their ears.

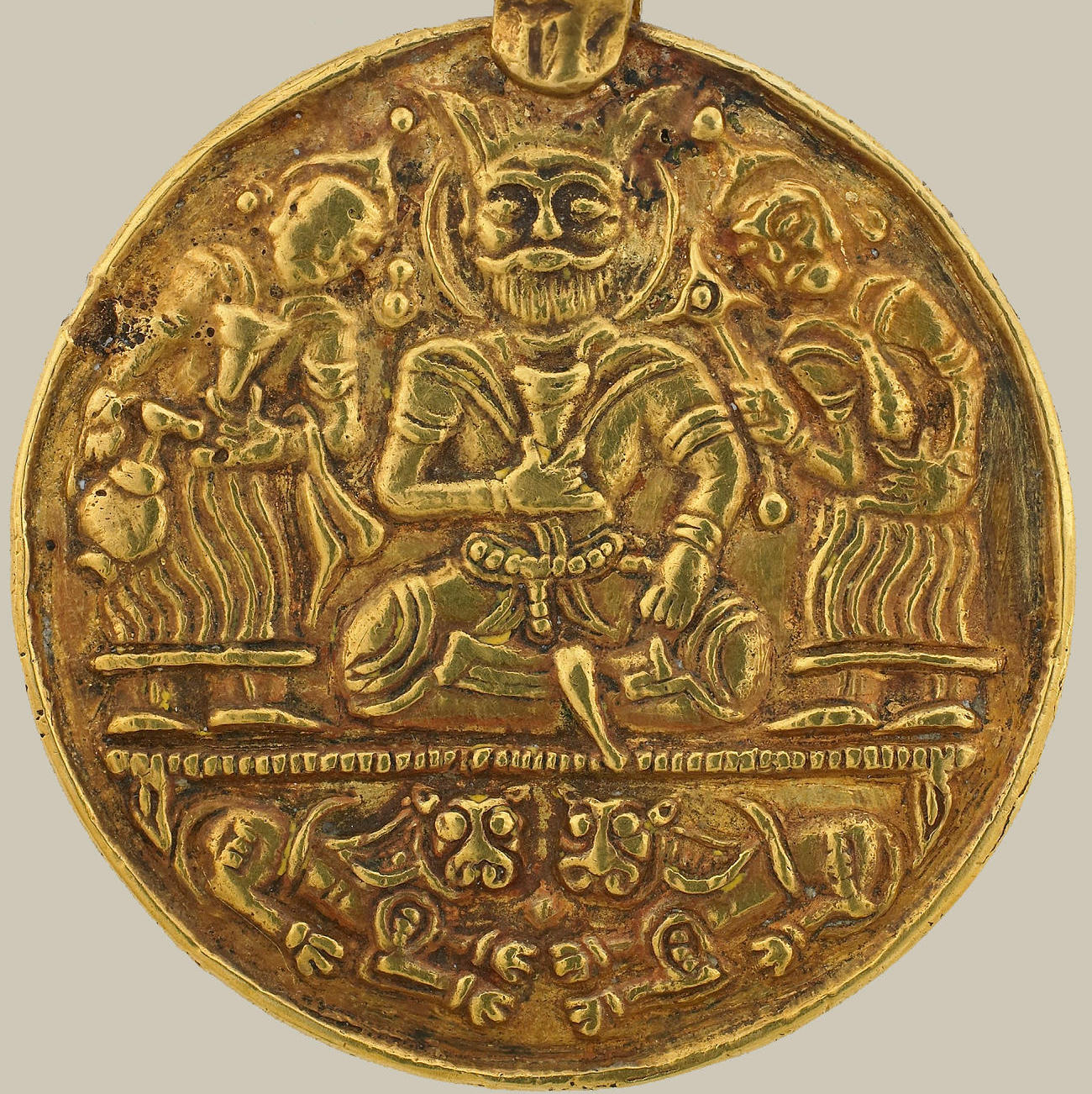
Gold medallion of Fana Khosrow depicting Buyid clothing

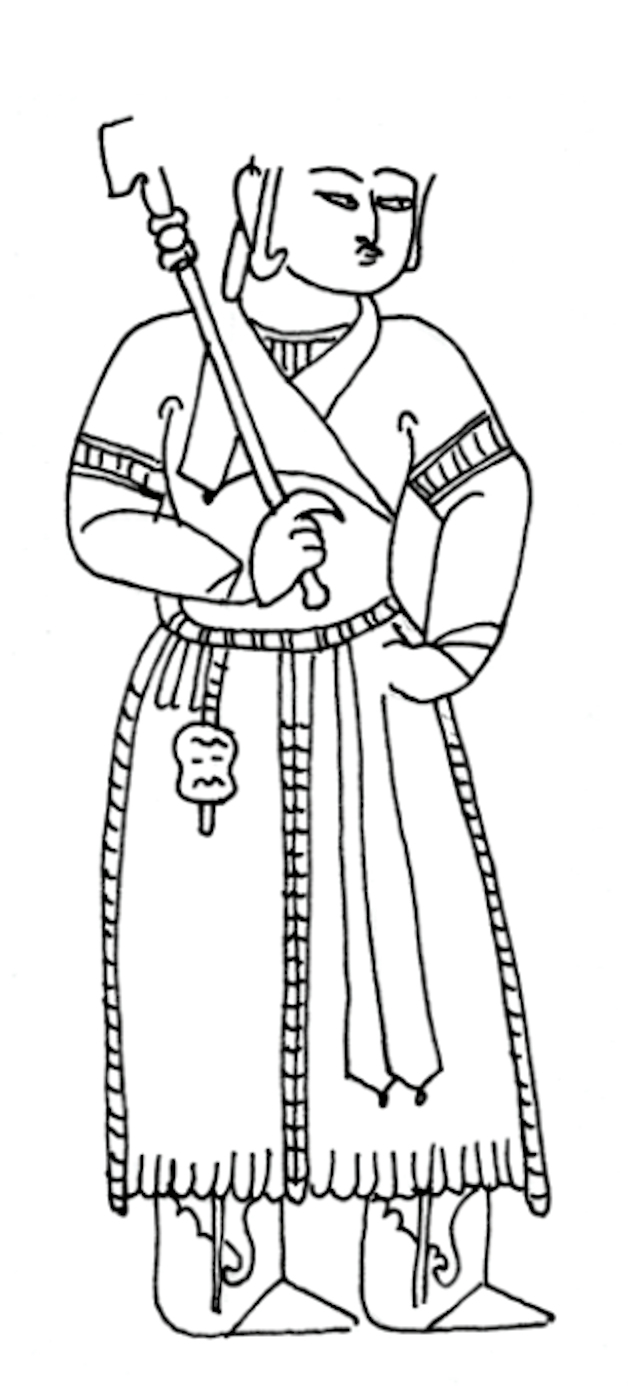
Single-lapel kaftan from a wall painting in Lashkari Bazar

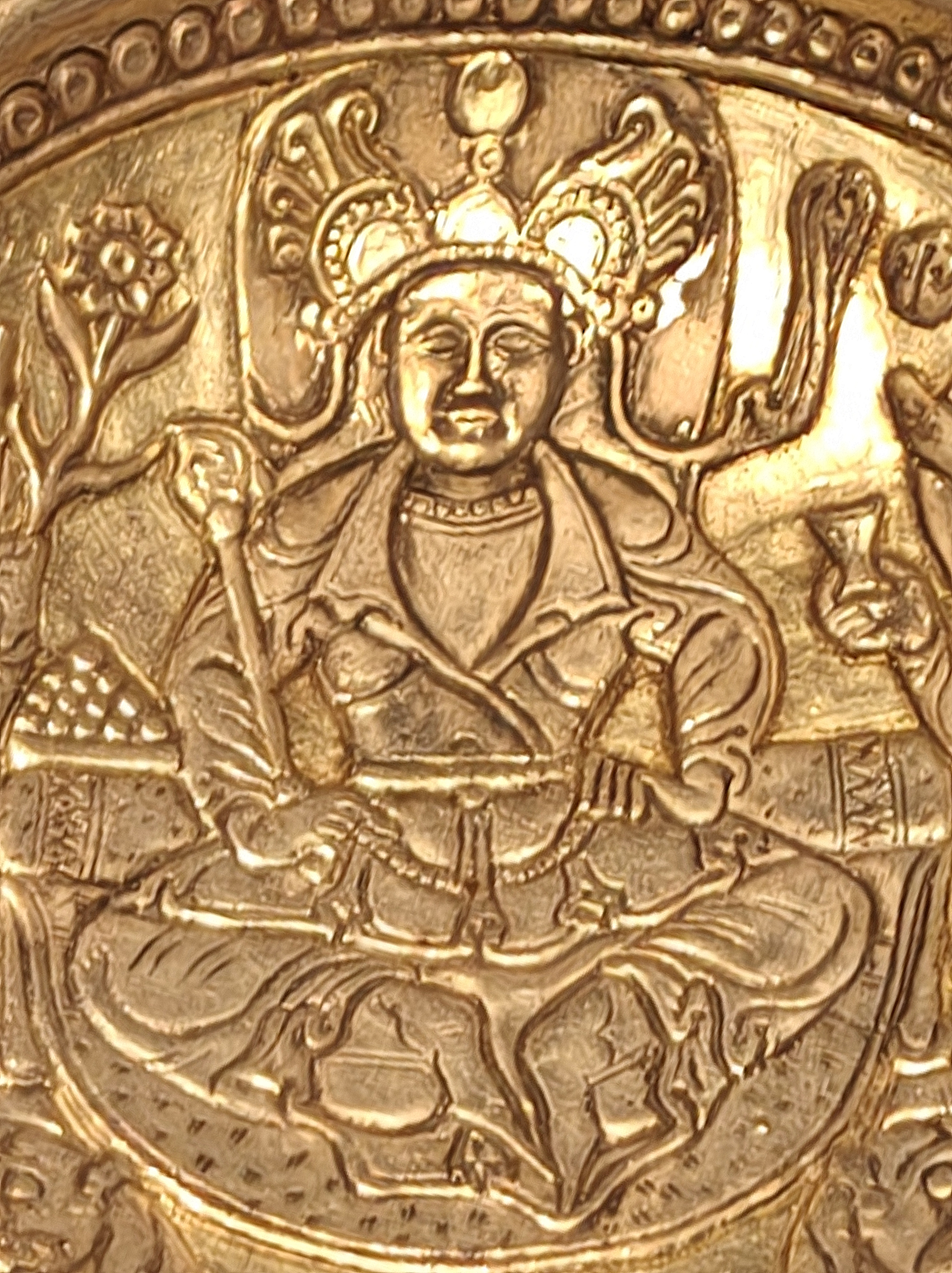
Example of early 11th century Iranian attire - Ghaznavid period

Four Human Figures around a Horse and Cheetah - Samanid period

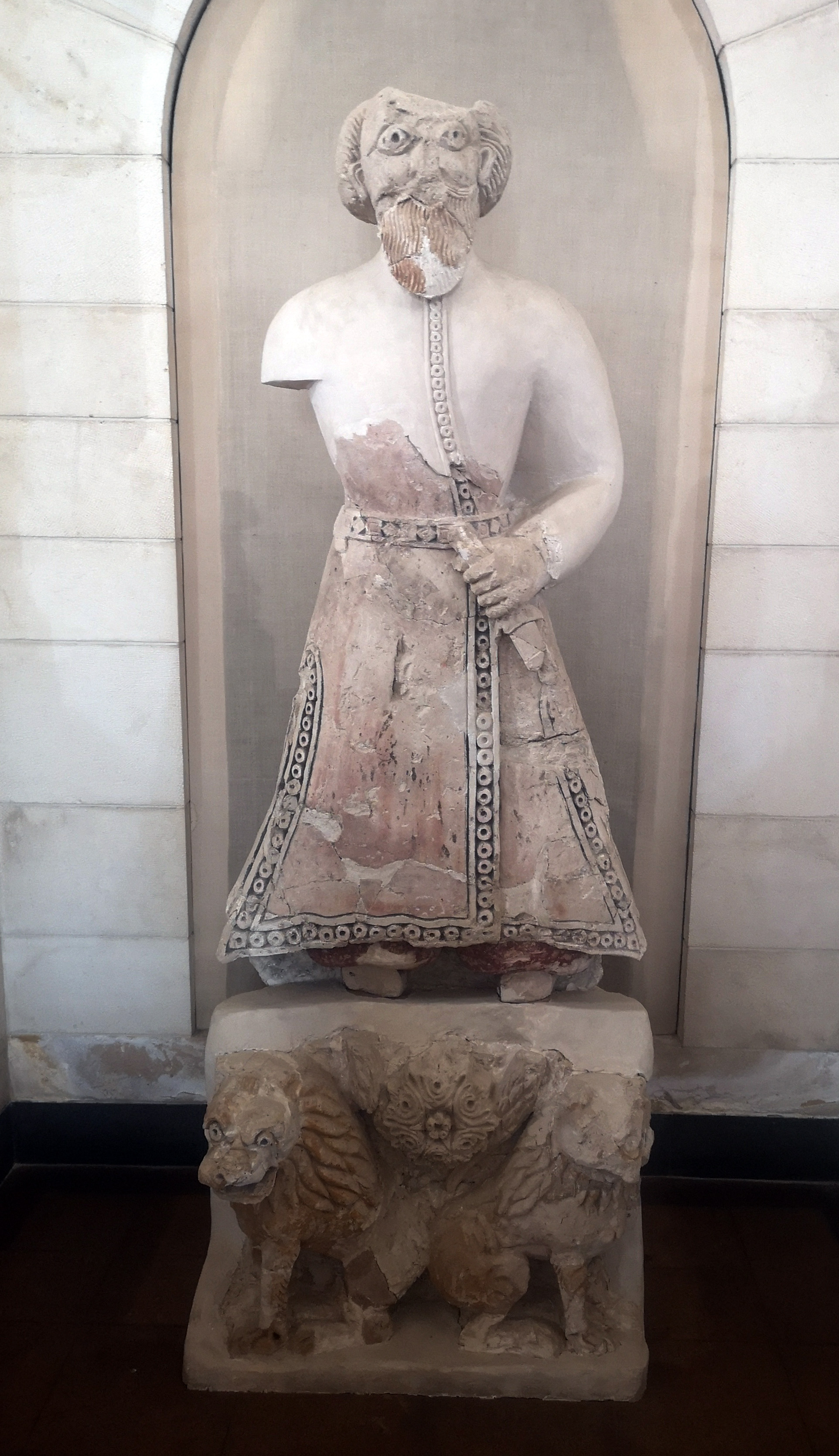
Umayyad statue of the "Standing Caliph" wearing a kaftan

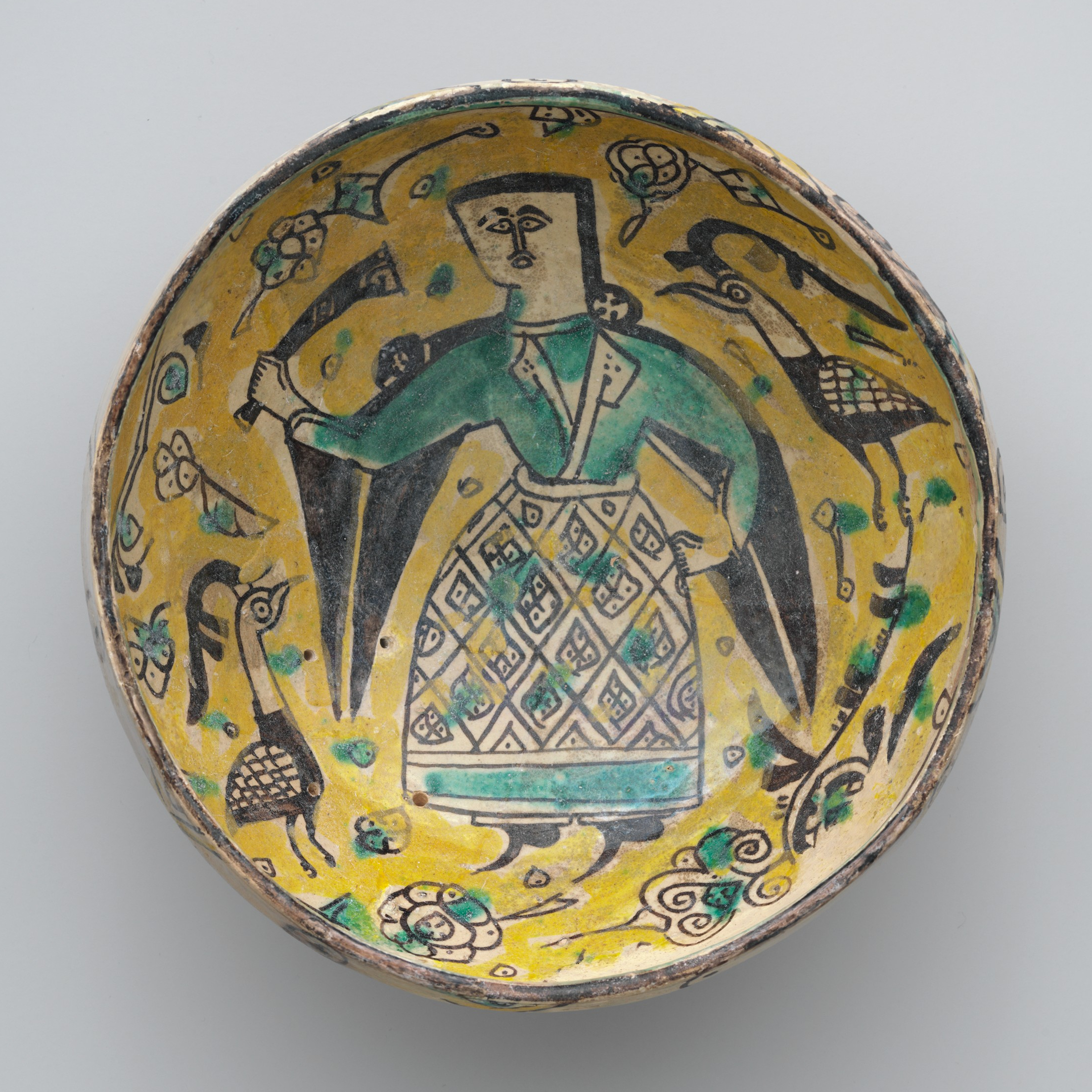
Samanid bowl depicting a figure wearing a double-lapel kaftan and wing-like sleeves

=== Under Turkic and Mongol rule ===
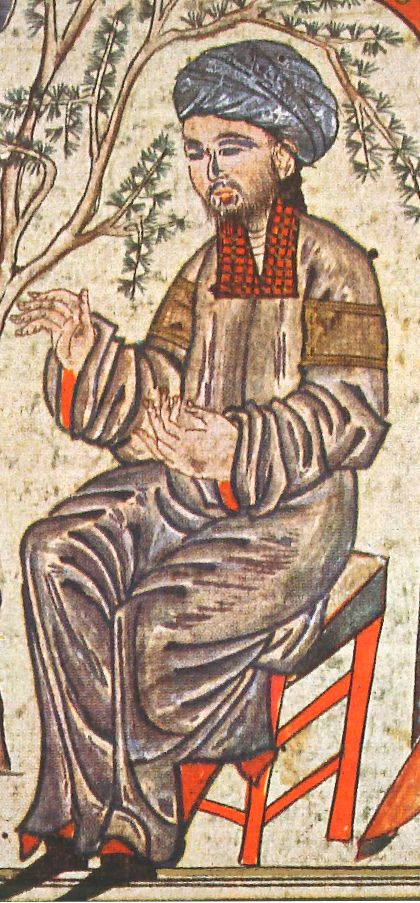
Iranian costume under the Ilkhanate - Jami al-Tawarikh

From the eleventh century onward, artworks and manuscripts increasingly distinguished East and Inner Asian, particularly Mongol and Turkic, attire from that of the Muslim West Asian world. Persian subjects were often clearly set apart through features such as beards and turbans. Despite this distinction, pre-Islamic Iranian shahs and heroes were frequently depicted in Turco-Mongol dress. Figures such as Rostam, Hushang, Jamshid, Zahhak, Manuchehr, Luhrasp, Gushtasp, Kay Kawus, Iskandar, and Tahmuras were Mongolized in Ilkhanid manuscripts, a convention that continued to influence later illustrations of the Shahnameh long after the fall of the dynasty.

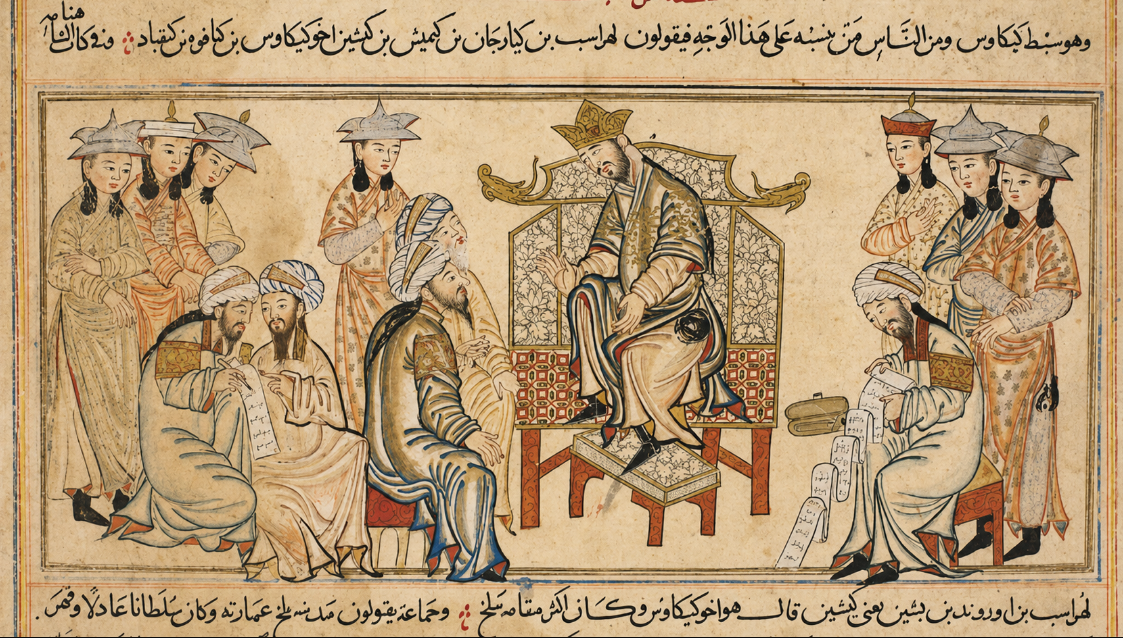
The Iranian shah Lohrasp depicted with Turkic attire with Persian scribes represented by robe and turban

The dress of Persian officials during this period generally consisted of a long, untailored robe and a turban. The robe could be bestowed as khilʿat and resembled the kaftan of the early Islamic period. It featured wide sleeves and polygonal necklines, while tiraz brassards remained a common decorative element shared with earlier kaftan styles. The cut of the robe recalled styles particularly associated with Fatimid Egypt, while Iranian variants are depicted in highly decorated versions in contemporary ceramics and manuscripts. The wider and longer sleeves, in contrast to the tight-sleeved kaftans of earlier periods, may alternatively reflect Chinese influence.

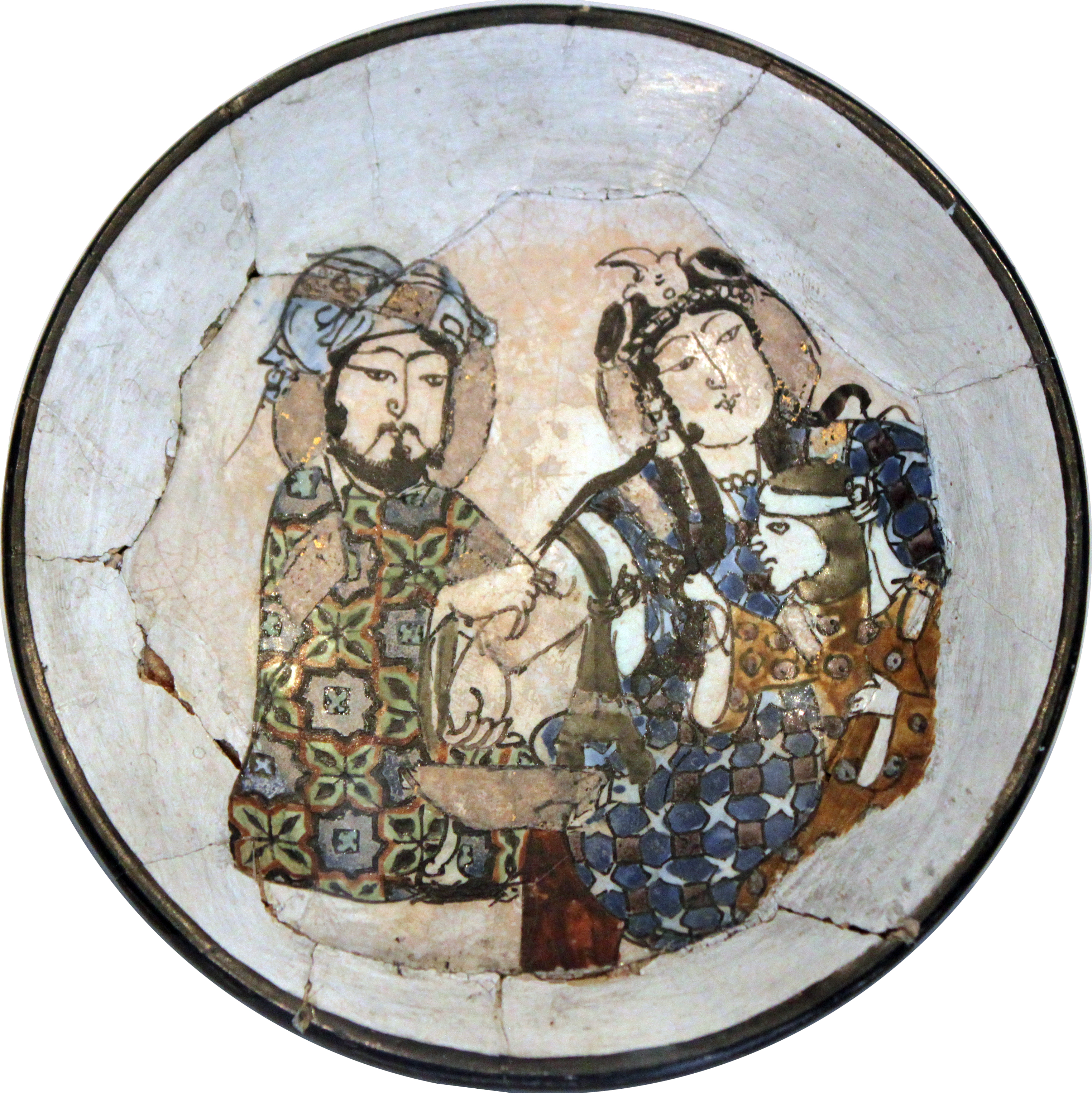
Costume of an Iranian man (left) from the Seljuk period

The turban, itself a continuation of earlier styles, consisted of a small cap wrapped in muslin cloth, the ends of which bore bands of white silk decorated with elaborate golden tiraz inscriptions in Kufic script. It was generally worn by high-status Muslim men of non-Turkic and non-Mongol background. Turbans grew larger over the course of the twelfth century, with some variants becoming more rounded and featuring long ends that hung down behind the head. Such variants appear to have been especially popular in Syria and Mesopotamia, although turbans continued to be worn in Persia well into the late thirteenth century. Certain variants found in Arabic-speaking regions, however, do not appear to have been adopted in Persia.

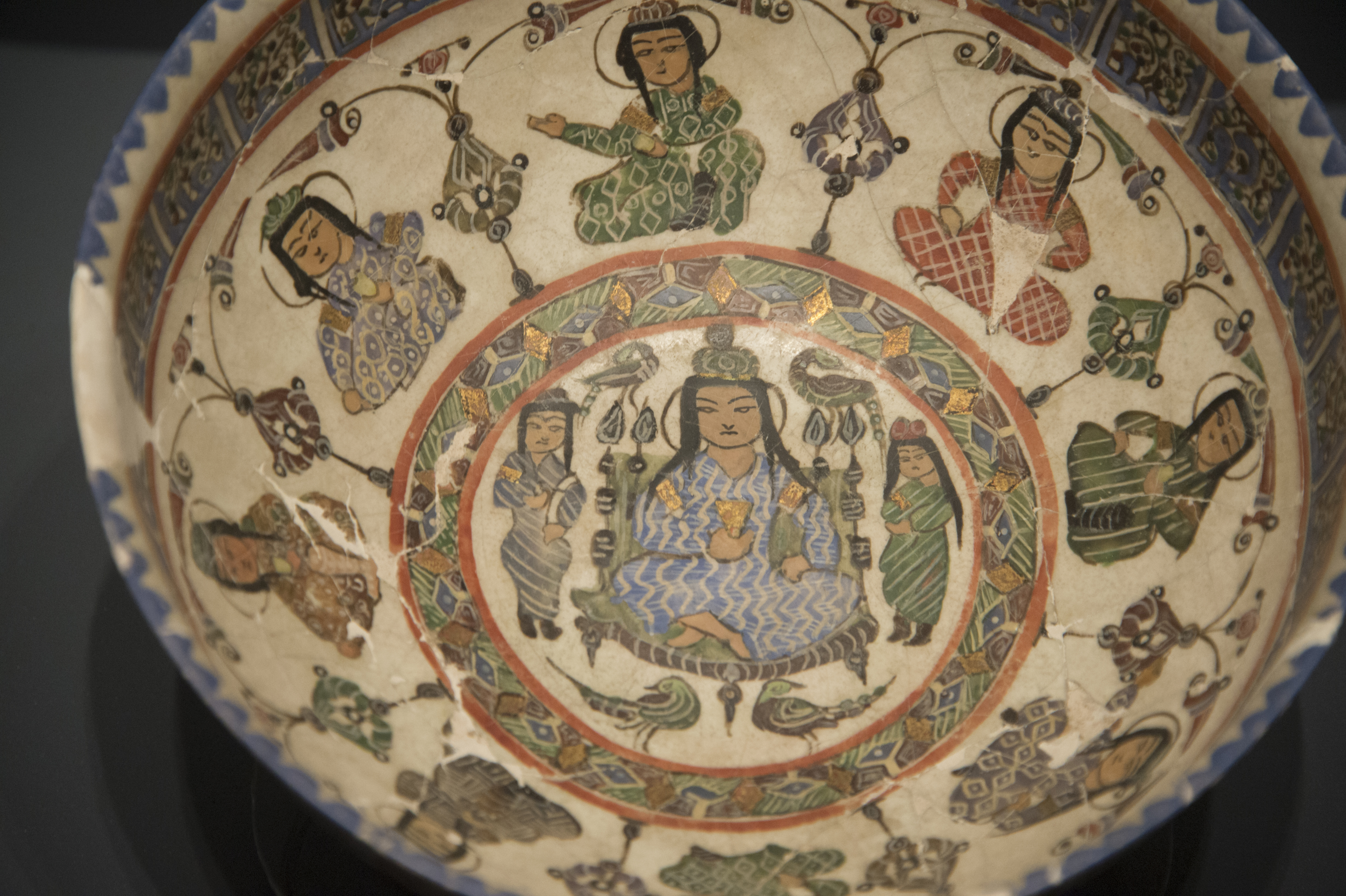
Women's dress in the Seljuk period

In contrast to Iranian costume, Seljuk Turks and Mongols are routinely depicted wearing belted, short-sleeved coats that either closed diagonally from right to left across the front and fastened beneath the right arm, or closed at the center with straight lapels and elbow-length sleeves. These were worn over a long-sleeved inner coat. During the Turkish period, kaftans with long, narrow sleeves and tiraz brassards, similar to those of earlier periods, were more frequent. Some closed vertically at the front and were bordered with jewelry, while others featured shoulder epaulettes recalling Sasanian attire.

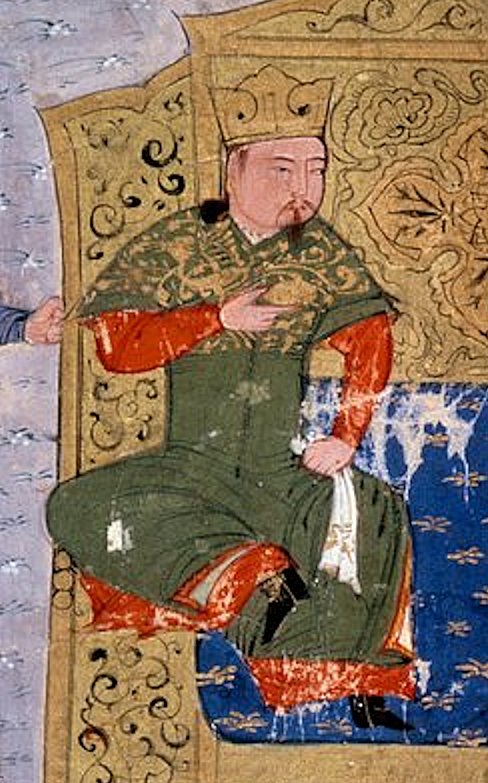
Hulegu Khan - shown in Turco-Mongol dress featuring a cloud collar and a Seljuk-style triconical crown.

Women's coats were constructed similarly to those of men and decorated with patterns of dots, scrolls, geometric designs, or figural motifs. Depictions of women became more numerous during this period, although Seljuk women could be difficult to distinguish from beardless male youths, except through characteristic female looped earrings. Women also wore coats with wider sleeves, whereas men were depicted exclusively with tight sleeves. An ornamental crown derived from Sasanian crowns, with the Buyids serving as an intermediary, was also popular among women. It consisted of a jeweled diadem decorated with a lotus bud or trefoil-shaped jewel, sometimes bound with long, decorated ribbons. Over time, this crown became a staple of the lower nobility and courtiers.

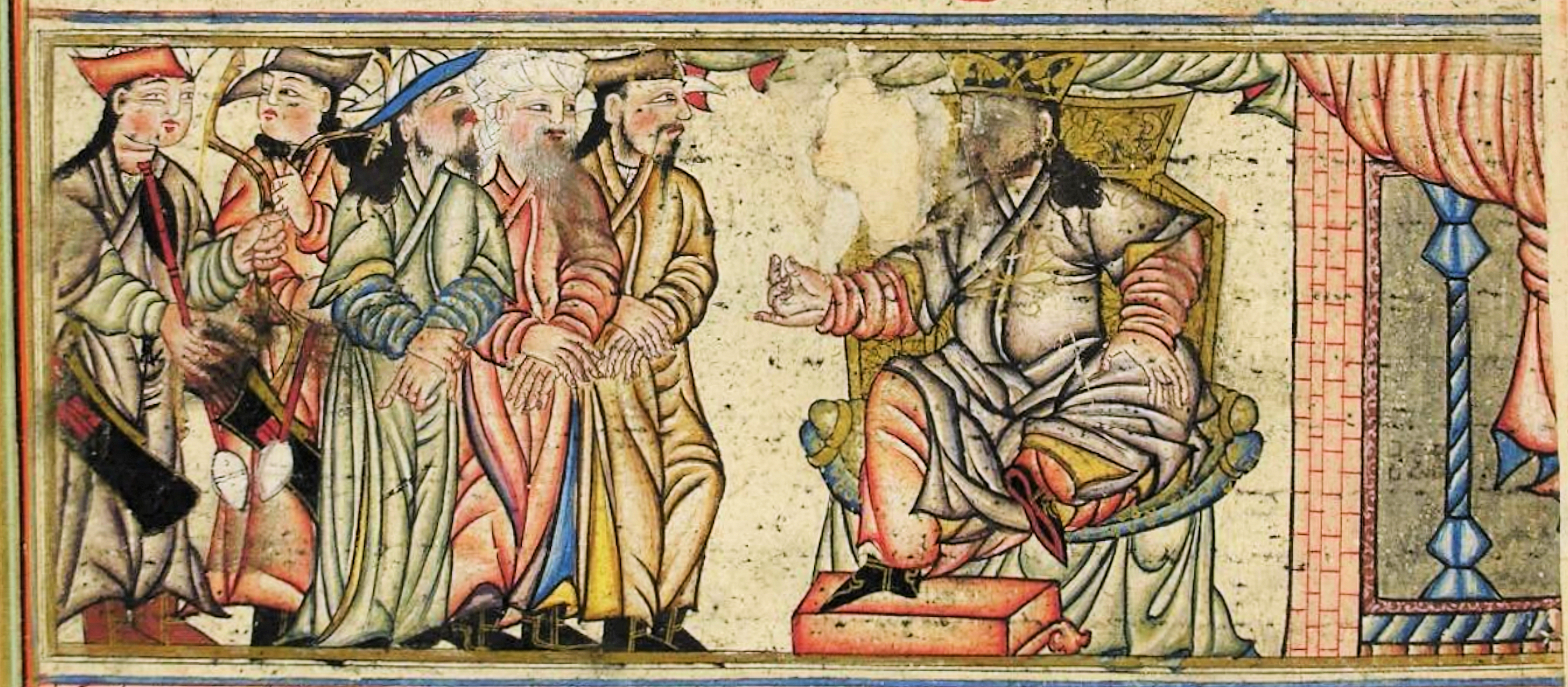
Seljuk sultan Malik-Shah depicted wearing a diagonally wrapped Turkic coat decorated at the center with a mandarin square.

The pointed boots of the Seljuks likewise followed Sasanian tradition. They were close-fitting, made of leather, and worn with the trousers tucked inside; the boots rose to a point at the knee. In some examples, this upward point was elongated into straps attached to the belt, recalling Arsacid and Sasanian leggings. Seljuk sultans also wore a triconical crown. During the Ilkhanate, clothing was most often described in terms of robes of honor and belts bestowed on various occasions and followed some precedents of Abbasid and Fatimid court dress. Ilkhanid men also wore large-brimmed hats with slits at the sides for flexibility. A qaba was typically worn beneath the outer coat, while outer coats could feature decorated yokes recalling the cloud collar, or central badges and ornamentation on the chest, possibly corresponding to the “mandarin square”.

== Guarded domains of Iran ==
Safavid Iran in 1660

Iranian clothing from the 16th-19th century typically consisted of a pirahan (tunic or shirt) and shalvar (trousers), worn beneath a qaba (long robe) secured at the waist with a shawl or sash. An outer coat or rada could be worn over the ensemble, while various forms of headwear, including turbans, taj (crown) or kolah (hat), completed the attire. These basic forms practiced since the Safavid period remained dominant until the gradual adoption of European fashions in the later nineteenth century. Safavid clothing preserved the traditional Iranian structure of dress inherited from earlier periods while developing a distinctive identity through advances in textile production, the revival of Sasanian artistic motifs, and the flourishing of the royal arts under the Safavid state. Shah Abbas I further standardized dress by regulating the relationship between sarpūsh and social rank, making headwear an important indicator of official status. Although garments became increasingly elaborate in their fabrics and decoration, the fundamental forms of Iranian dress remained remarkably conservative, and many clothing types continued with only gradual modification until the Westernizing reforms of Naser al-Din Shah in the nineteenth century.

=== Headwear ===
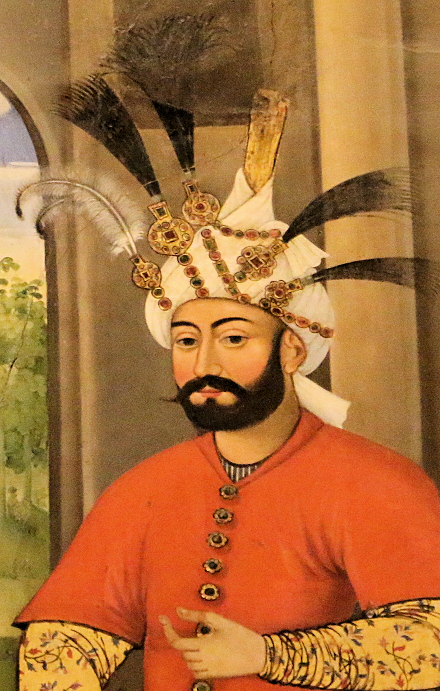
Shah Tahmasp I wearing a Taj-Tumar

The Taj-e Haydari (Persian: تاج حیدری, "Crown of Haydar"), was a twelve-gored cap with a tall, pointed top, symbolizing the twelve Shiʿite imams The hat was typically red, though other colors were also used to match the rest of the outfit. It might be adorned with nothing more than gold chains or feathers, but more often it was wrapped in a turban made from a long white scarf, draped in elegant layers and finished with a fan-shaped ornament. This scarf, woven from silk or fine cotton, could be plain with decorated ends or entirely embellished with intricate embroidery. Taj-e haydari was often decorated with chains, feathers and jeghe. The Jeqeh (Persian: جقه), jighe, parak or til, named after paisley is an ornamental piece made of feathers and jewels that was used atop the crowns, hats, and turbans of Iranian Shahs and several other rulers of the Islamic world, including the sultans of the Ottoman Empire and the Mamluks of Egypt. The Jeghe, featuring the motif of a bent cypress (a symbol of humility), represents Iran and the Iranian people. Jeghe was heavily used in earlier Qajar headwear for both men and women. These jeghe-decorated variants were referred to as Taj-Tumar (Persian: تاج طومار).

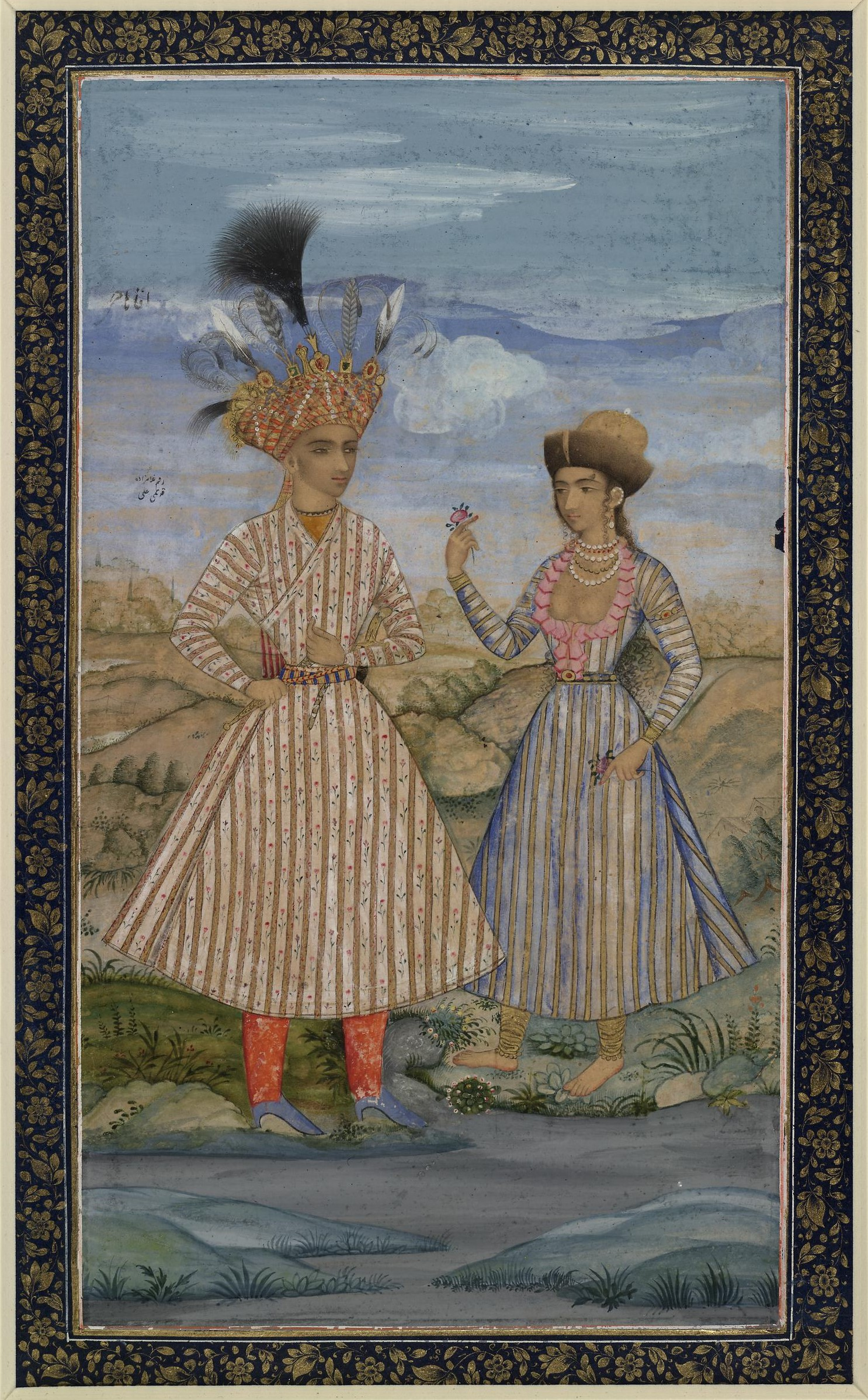
Painting by Aliquli Jubbadar depicting a young man wearing the Taj-e Qizilbash highly decorated by jeghe

The Taj-e Qizilbash (Persian: تاج قزلباش, "Qizilbash Crown") was a Safavid ceremonial headgear consisting of a short kolāh wrapped in a wide Khorasani-style turban draped to give maximum width and size, furnished with a projecting baton broadened or bulbous at the tip, sometimes secured by a narrow contrasting cloth band, with loose sash ends falling to the shoulders and, in some depictions, a black fan-shaped plume. Its earlier form, the taj-e haydari, was associated with Shaykh Ḥaydar, Shah Ismail I, and Shah Tahmasp, having had a very tall red baton and became the emblem of the Qizilbash, while under Shah Tahmasp the baton became longer, more slender, and round rather than faceted, and the overall silhouette more symmetrical and ovoid. Shah Abbas I later reinstated the custom of wearing a special hat which demonstrated the allegiance of the wearer to his person and to the traditions of the Safavid state, and the new taj he introduced derived its wide shape and encompassing cloth tie from a type of turban associated with Khorasan in the 1580s.

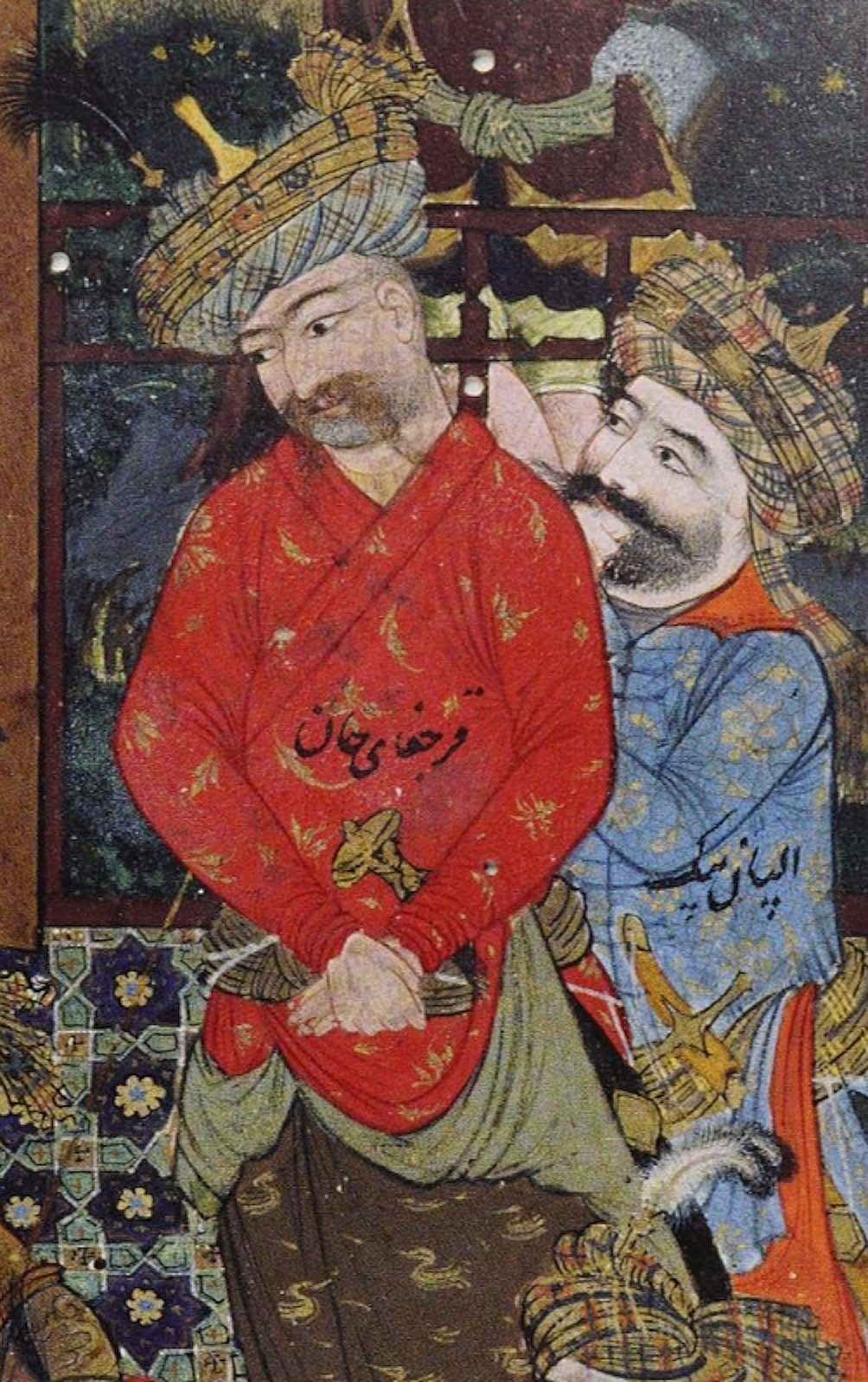
Qarachaqay Khan and Alpan Beig depicted wearing the Taj-e Qizilbash

The headgear was not normally worn by the Shah himself, but by men whose allegiance to him was immediate and visible, including high military officers, selected noblemen of the court, armed guards, governors, generals, and Safavid envoys abroad, for whom the special Qizilbash taj formed part of the appropriate seventeenth-century diplomatic costume. During the reigns of Shah Soleiman and Shah Sultan Husayn, it appears to have been largely confined to members of the Shah’s bodyguard who functioned as directors of court ceremonies, although a more ornate and crown-like version also survived in coronation ritual. Contemporary evidence, especially passages in Iskandar Beg Munshi and later discussion of Shah Abbas's symbolic policies, indicates that the Qizilbash hat marked a special relationship between its wearer and the monarch, so that its restoration under Shah Abbas functioned as a visual reaffirmation of loyalty to both the ruler and the Safavid state

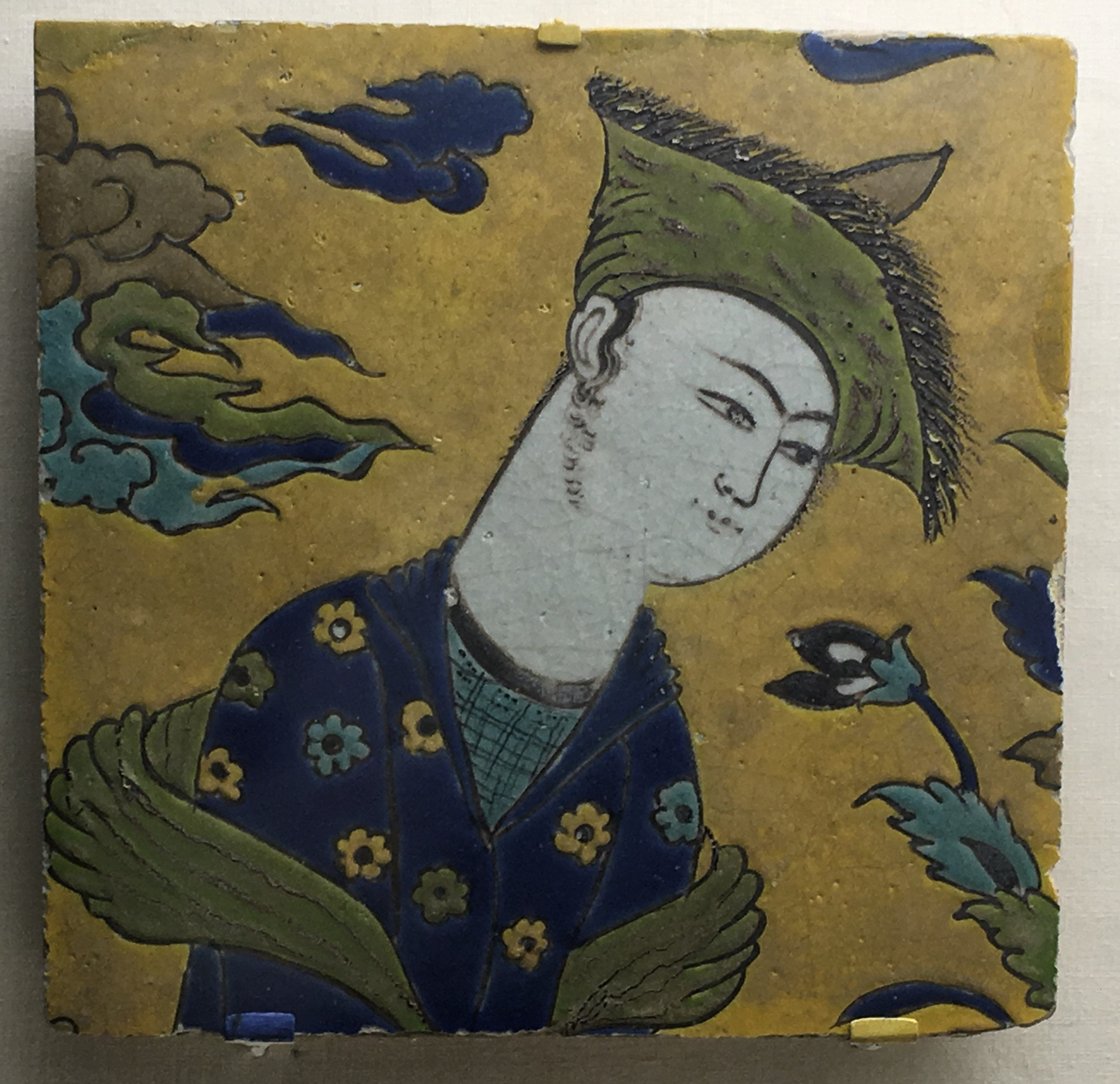
Safavid youth wearing the Bushireh kolāh

The Bushireh kolāh (Persian: بوشیره کلاه) was a Safavid fur hat associated particularly with royal runners and footmen as well as Jazayerchi musketeers, and was said to have been brought into fashion by Shah Abbas the great. It was a hat made of fur and cloth, with a pointed tip and wide or slit brims lined with fur. Some examples incorporated gold and silver into the fabric, indicating that the form could range from functional service headgear to a more ornamented courtly type. In some descriptions, the outer part was made of cloth while the interior was lined with sable fur, and the hat was usually placed tilted on the head. It could also appear with a pyramidal profile, with fur trimmed edges turned upward.

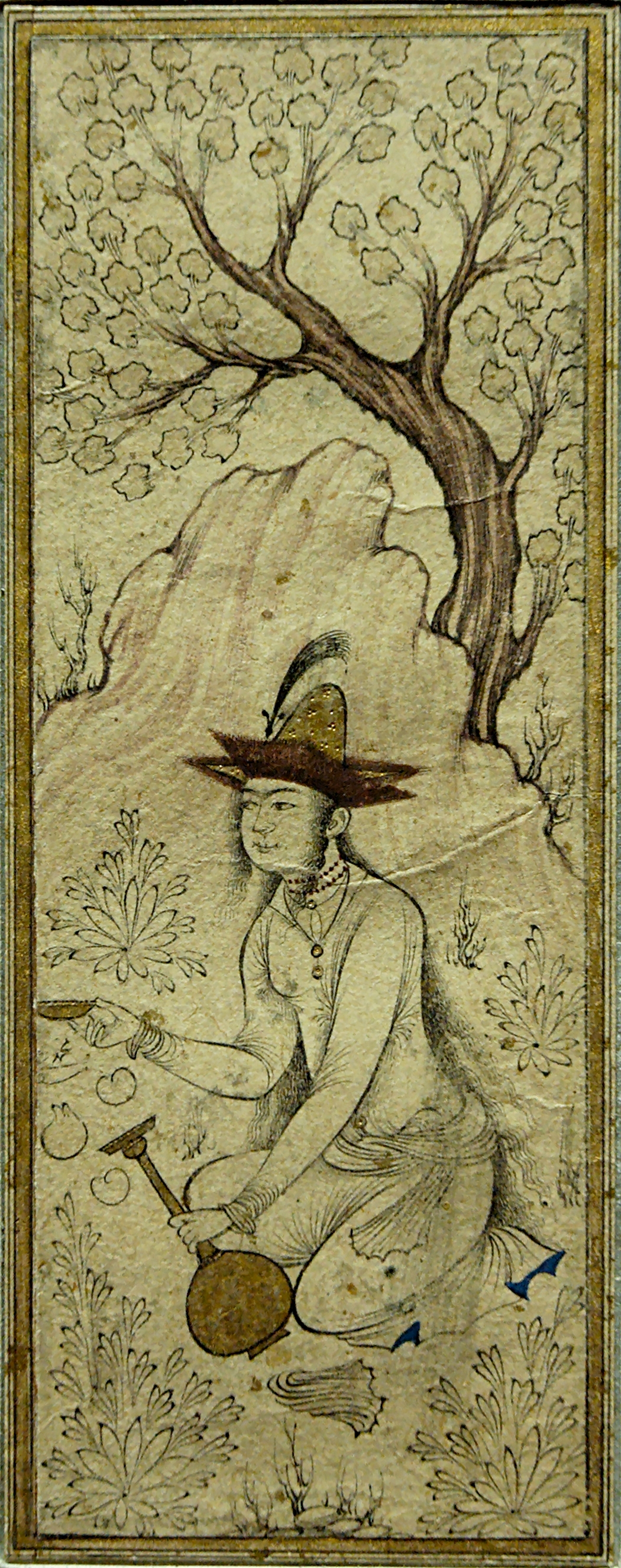
Example of Safavid Saraquj - the brim sometimes depicted lined with fur

The Saraquj was a high, pointed, conical hat of Central Asian origin. It usually had a brim that was turned upward, although the brim could also be turned downward. The hat was most often white or light tan, but could also be two toned, with a light brim and a colored crown. The conical crown could be simple or divided into vertical panels, and a colored takhfifa could be crossed around it and fixed with a brooch or plaquette at the point where the cloth overlapped. The point of the crown could remain plain or be finished with a metallic knob, pointed plaquette, tuft, or long plumes.

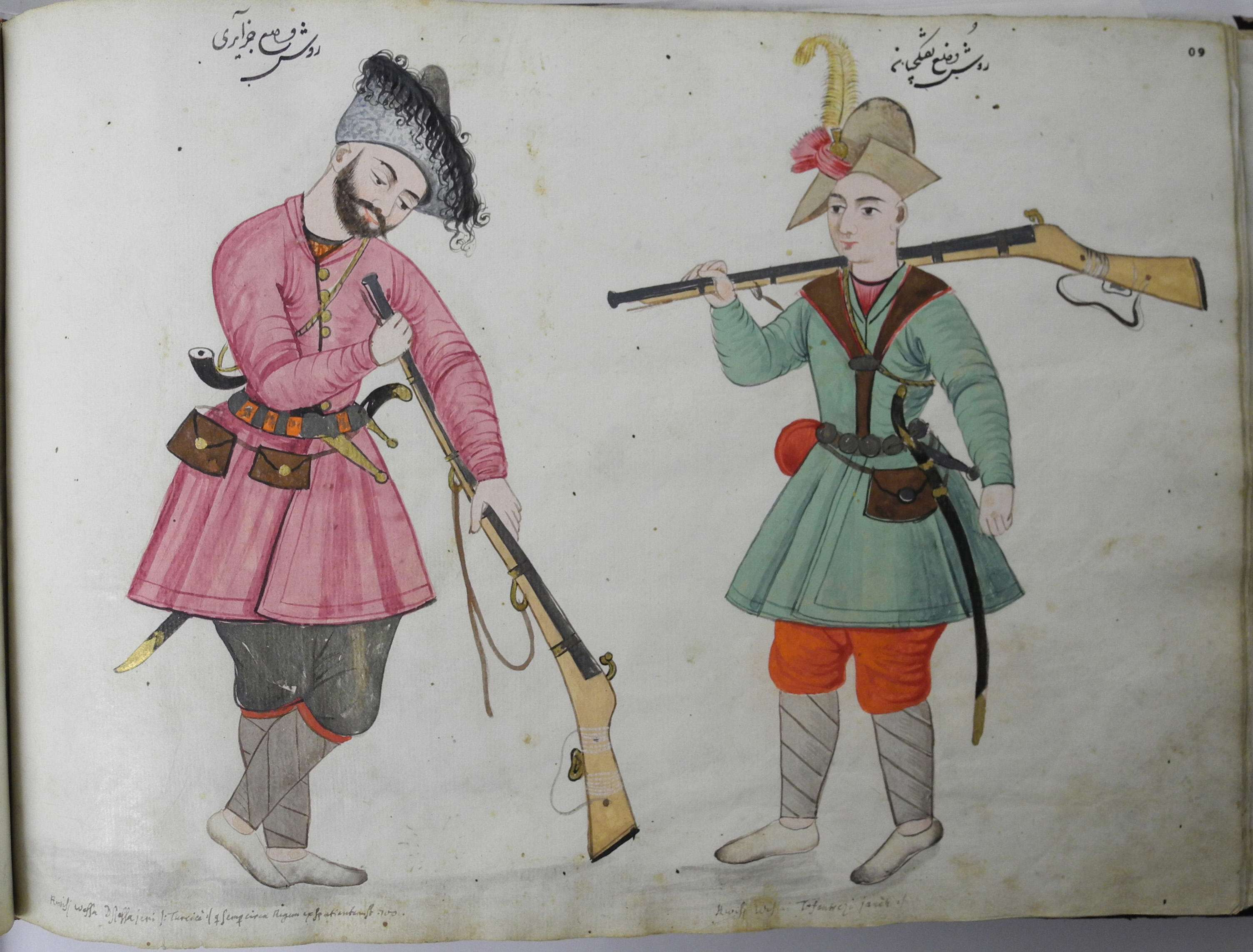
Safavid Tofangchi (right) wearing the kolāh-e Shateri, and a Jazayerchi (left) wearing the Bushireh kolāh

The kolāh-e Shateri (Persian: کلاه شاطری) was a special felt cap worn by shāters (royal runners) and related service personnel and was designed to fit firmly and securely on the head. It could be decorated with feathers or flowers, reflecting a broader Safavid practice in which feathers, plants, pearls, and similar elements were commonly used as headgear ornaments. Some forms of the kolāh-e Shāterī were made with a broad brim, allowing the wearer’s face to be protected from the sun during long journeys. As part of its symbolic function, a feather was often attached to the cap as a sign of agility and swift service, qualities associated with the role of the shāters.

Safavid Cavalryman wearing a Bork

The Bork (Persian: بورک) was a common Safavid cap made from a combination of cloth and skin or fur. It could be designed simply or with cuts and slits at the front and back. The cap was worn inside out, with the fur or skin turned outward and the cloth turned inward, and this layered construction was made visible by folding back the brim. Borks were very common in Iran, and some people wore them at home for comfort. Notable persons avoided wearing them outside the house, but among servants and ordinary slaves their use was normal and customary. Another variant of the Bork was the kolāh-e Buqi (Persian: کلاه بوقی), a type of head covering used for male slaves, female slaves, and the lower classes of society. It was made of wool and felt with the loose, sack-like tip extended and falling to the sides

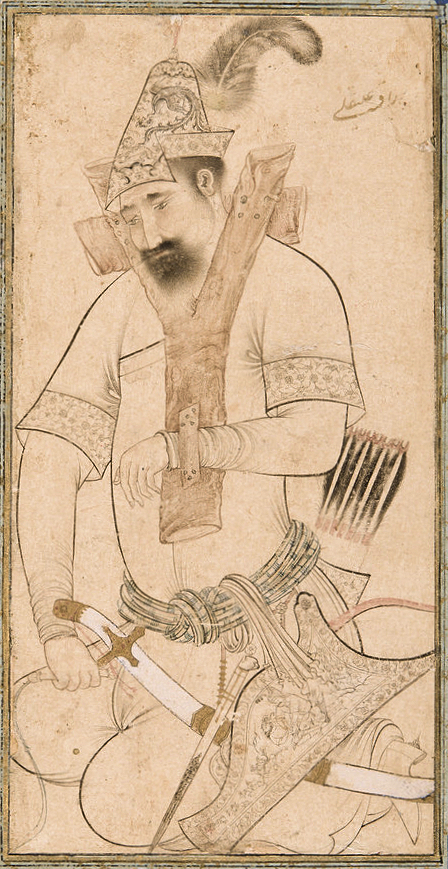
Safavid painting of a Turkoman prisoner wearing the Qalpaq

The Qalpaq (Persian: قالپاق) was a pointed cap, usually white, associated with Turkic peoples of Central Asia and sometimes described as the Turanian hat. It was worn by servants, often with the side flaps or earflaps turned upward, while the front brim was pulled down over the forehead. In Safavid and Persianate works on paper, this form of headwear appears especially in depictions of Turcoman figures and bound captives, where it functioned as a visual marker of Central Asian Turkic identity.

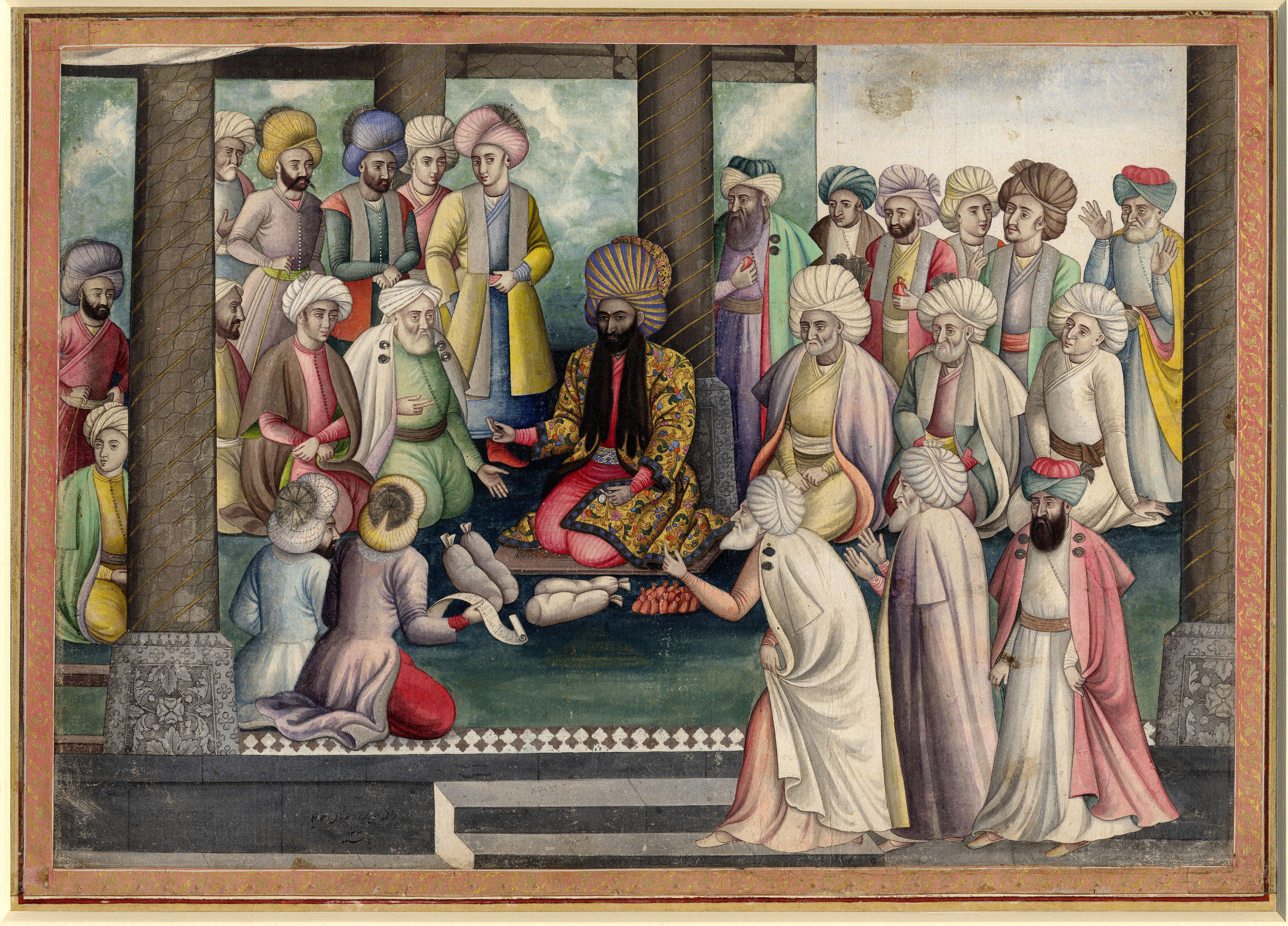
Court of Shah Soltan Hoseyn, depicting officials wearing the Khalil-Khani turban

The khalīl-khānī (Persian: خلیل خانی) was a type of turban and taj worn by court officials in the latter years of the Safavid dynasty and functioned as a marker of high administrative and courtly status. These turbans were made of gold-brocaded silk or richly embroidered fabrics and were often adorned at the front with feathers or fan-like ornaments. Wealthy individuals further decorated their turbans with gold coins and precious stones, and the price of such turbans could reach between 700 and 800 gold coins, reflecting their exceptional value. The Khalīl-Khānī was also known as dolband or mandīl and was considered among the most valuable items of Iranian dress. Contemporary observers report that these turbans were so heavy that they could scarcely be borne on the head, with some examples exceeding twelve to fifteen livres in weight. Their length typically measured sixteen to eighteen cubits, while even the lightest versions weighed no less than half that amount. In general construction, the turban consisted of a base made from coarse white cloth, over which a finer silk or silk-cotton fabric was wrapped, sometimes woven with gold-thread patterns, and in certain cases gold threads were inserted beneath the outer fabric to enhance its splendor.

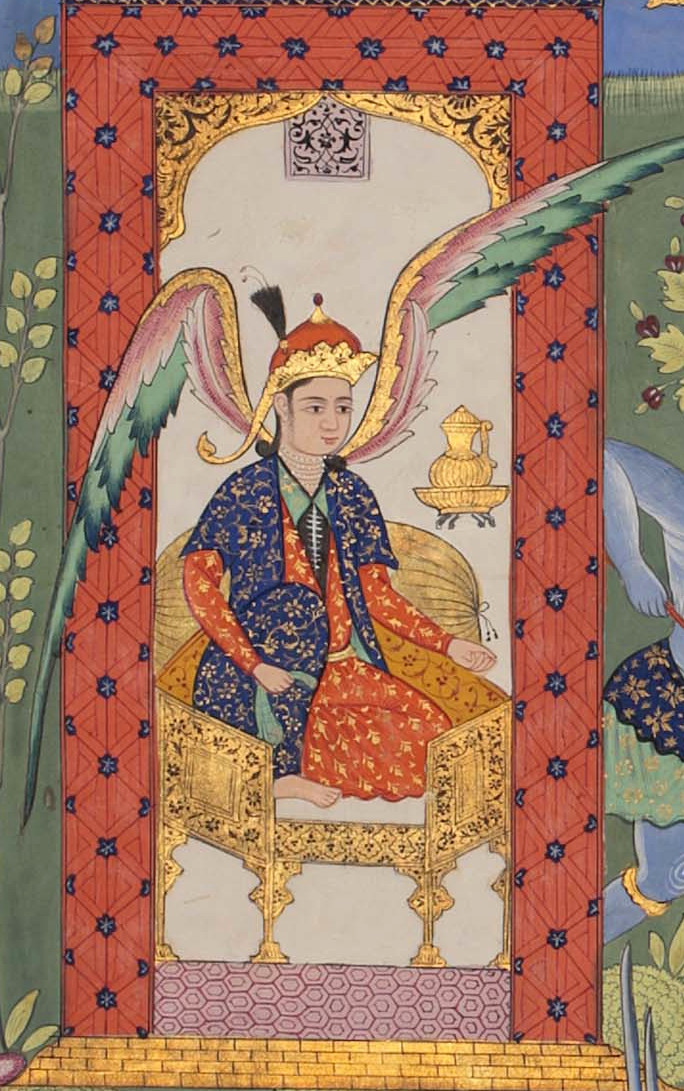
Example of women's Taj-kolāh from the Falnama

The Taj-kolāh (Persian: تاج کلاه) was a Timurid and early Safavid form of elite headgear prominent in Persian miniatures by men of high noble rank, usually Amirs or Shahs. It appeared as a small crown-like hat with a cap set inside it, and its central form could have either a rounded top or a conical top. Its construction has been compared to related Mongol hats, which were made from burlap soaked with glue to hold the shape and then covered with fabric. The taj-kolāh developed from ancient Turco-Persian and Indo-Buddhist forms of headgear. Most of the crowns depicted are associated with legendary and epic figures from the Shahnameh. Of the twenty-one illustrations studied, thirteen show epic or mythological characters wearing crowns. Among them, figures such as Keyumars, regarded as Iran’s first king, appear to have attracted painters’ attention more often than other mythical rulers. Women's taj-kolāh were decorated with floral motifs, with metal rims shaped like flower petals and extending backward into boteh-jeghe forms.

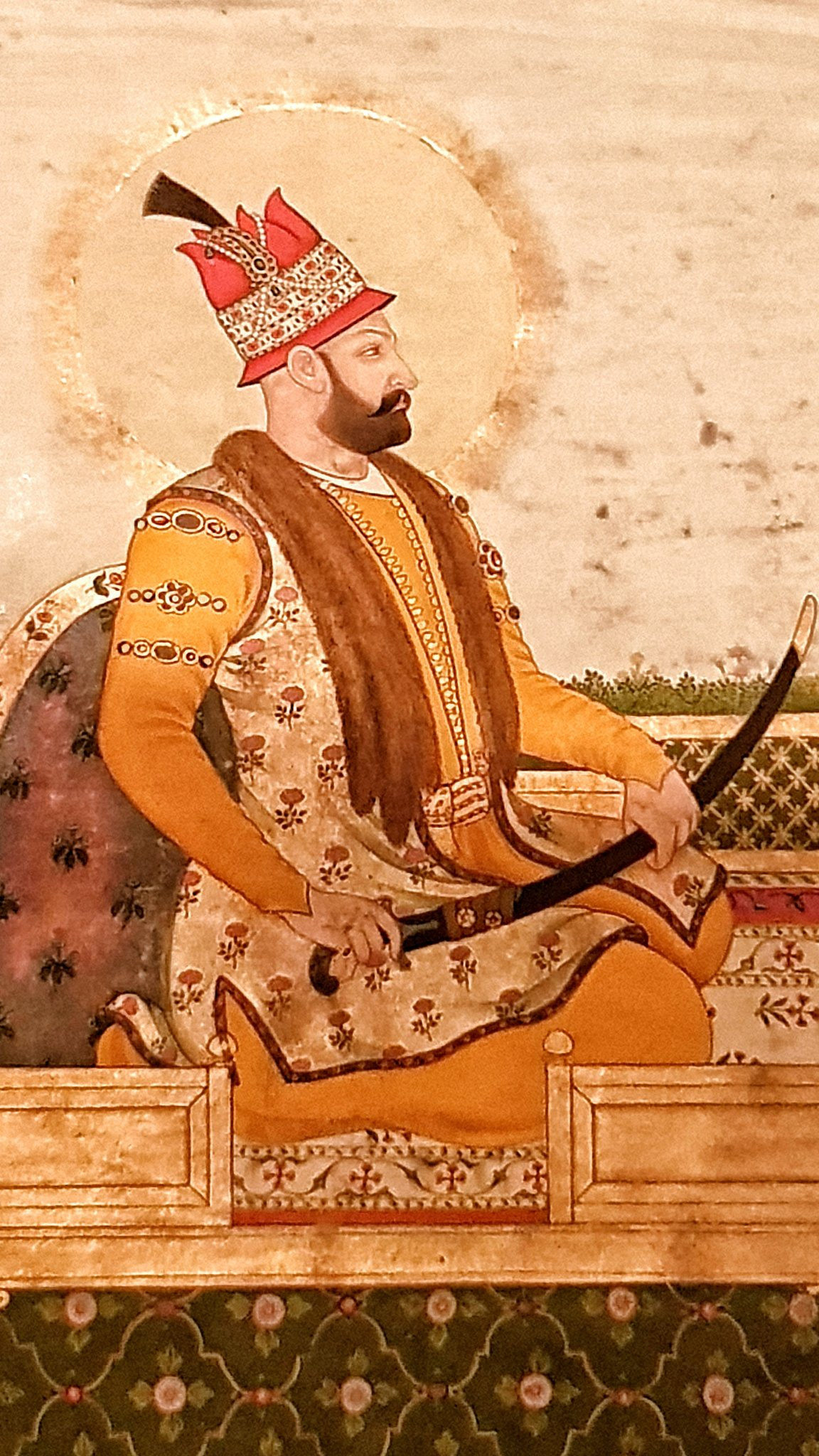
Painting of Nader Shah depicted wearing the kolāh-e Naderi

Later during Nader Shah's reforms a new type of hat was introduced that came to be known as the kolāh-e nāderī (Persian: کلاه نادری; Naderi hat). This was a red hat with four peaks which symbolized the first four caliphs of Islam. Alternatively, it has also been recorded that the four peaks symbolized the territories of Persia, India, Turkestan, and Khwarazm to replace the Taj-e Haydari, which was pieced with twelve gores (evocative of the twelve Shiʿite Imams)

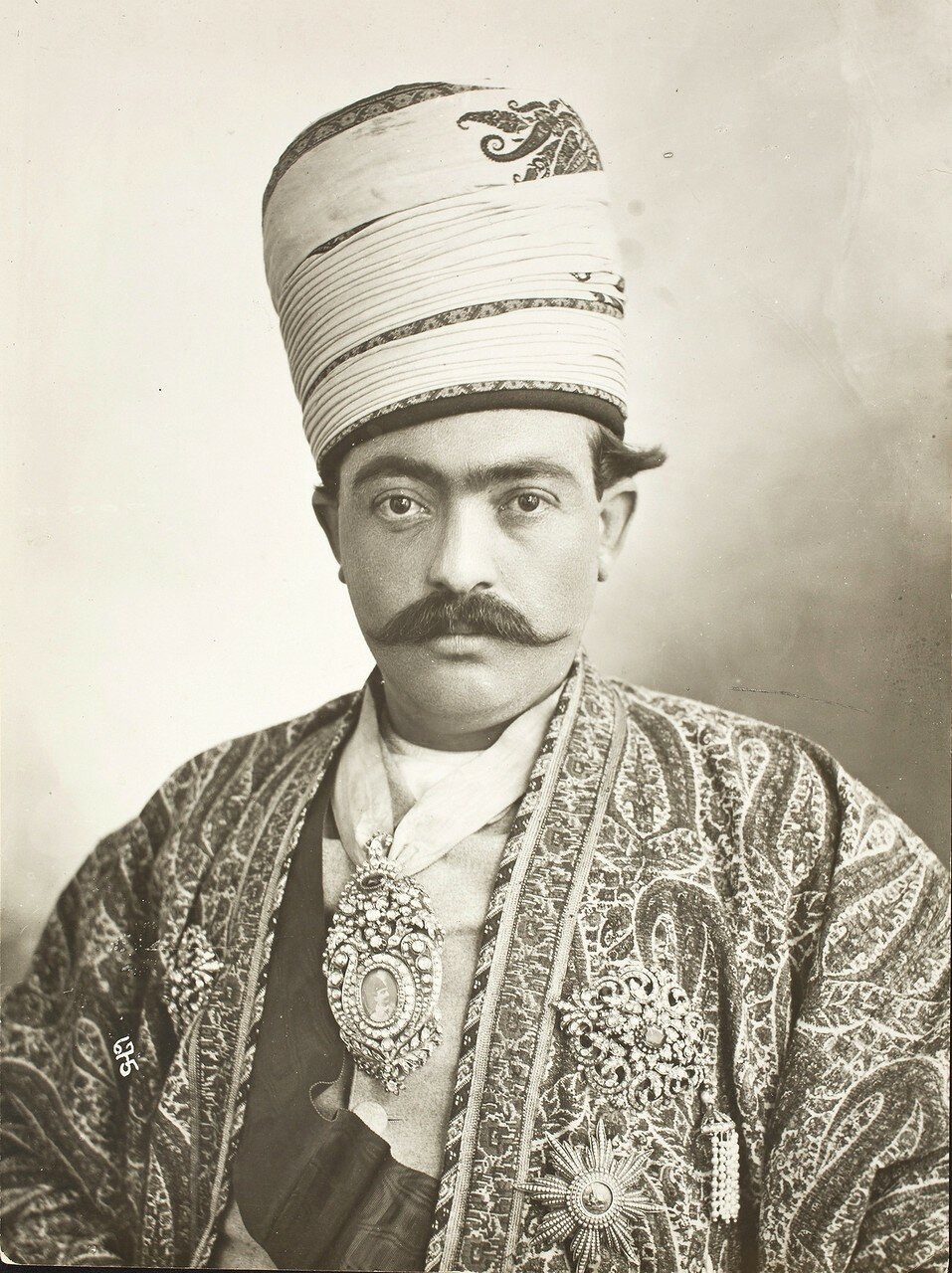
Qajar statesman Ali Khan Zahir od-Dowleh depicted wearing the Shāl-Kolāh

Shāl-kolāh (Persian: شال‌ کلاه; Shawl-hat) consisted of various types of hand-woven shawls (Shāl) in the Zand and Qajar periods that wrapped around tall rounded kolāhs in a manner inherited from Safavid traditions, with the shawl’s end tucked upward and to one side of the hat. Wealthy men of high social status favored Kermani or Kashmiri shawls, since the wrapping style of these expensive textiles visibly reflected one’s social rank in the community. Men of lower status, however, used cheaper Chinese shawls in imitation of the elite, but the difference in material and wrapping distinguished their lower class position.

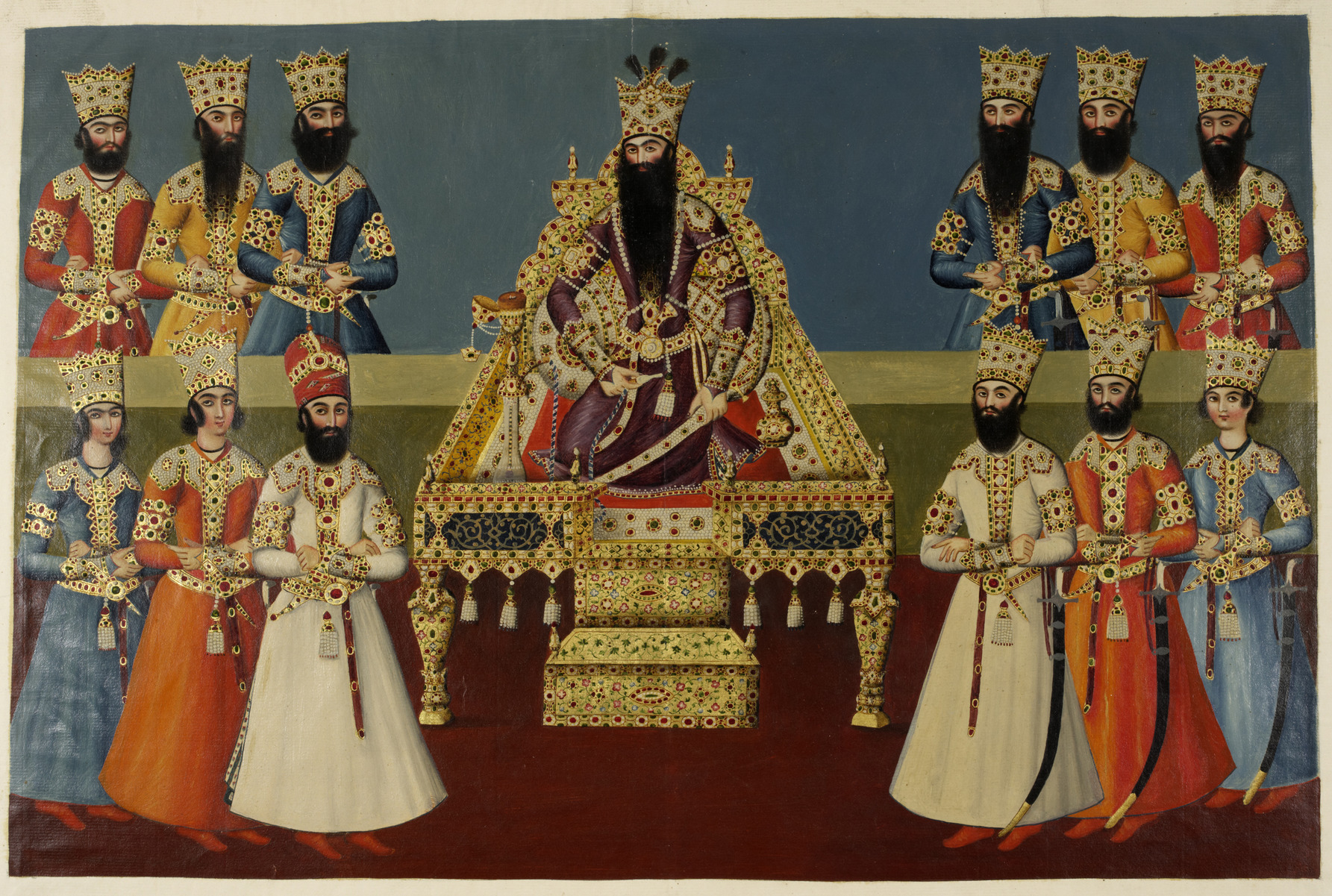
Fath'Ali Shah and his sons all wearing the Taj

During the early years of the Qajar dynasty, fashion was distinguished by the lavish use of gems and pearls to adorn clothing. A notable example is the Kiani Crown (Persian: تاج کیانی), a tall velvet headdress extensively decorated with diamonds, emeralds, rubies, and pearls. This was utilized not just by the Shah, but by the foremost Princes of the realm. This type of crown consists of four parts, arranged from bottom to top: the headband section, the pearl section, the battlements, and at the very top, a red velvet cap. The second section features 1,800 pearls forming a white background for emeralds and rubies. Excluding the Jeghe of the crown, the height of the cap is 32 centimeters and its width is 19.5 centimeters.

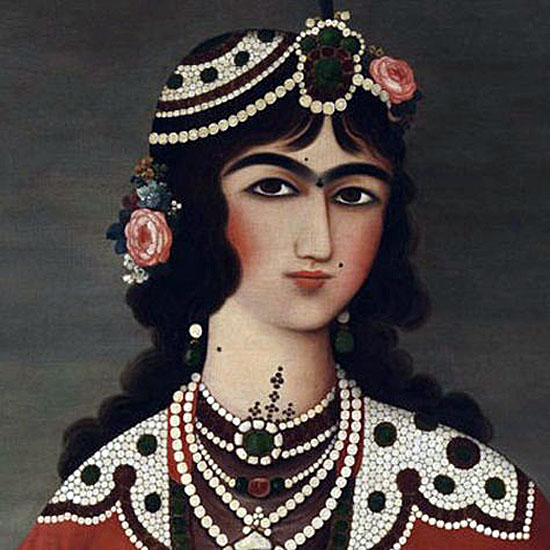
A woman from the Qajar period depicted wearing a decorated kolāhak - possibly Jeyran

The kolāhak (Persian: کلاهک; little kolāh) was a small women's cap worn beneath a fine veil as part of Qajar head dress, particularly during the reign of Fath-Ali Shah. It was woven from delicate colored silk and formed a close fitting cap that served as the foundation for additional ornaments. The kolāhak could be decorated with a jeghe of striped patterns, to which embroidered shawls were attached at the back, sometimes so long that they wrapped around the neck before falling down the back. Women's head coverings commonly consisted of the kolāhak or an araqchīn worn together with a fine netted veil, while ornaments were attached above the forehead in the form of a crest. According to the wearer's social standing, these ornaments could be decorated with jewels, pearls, gold, and silver.

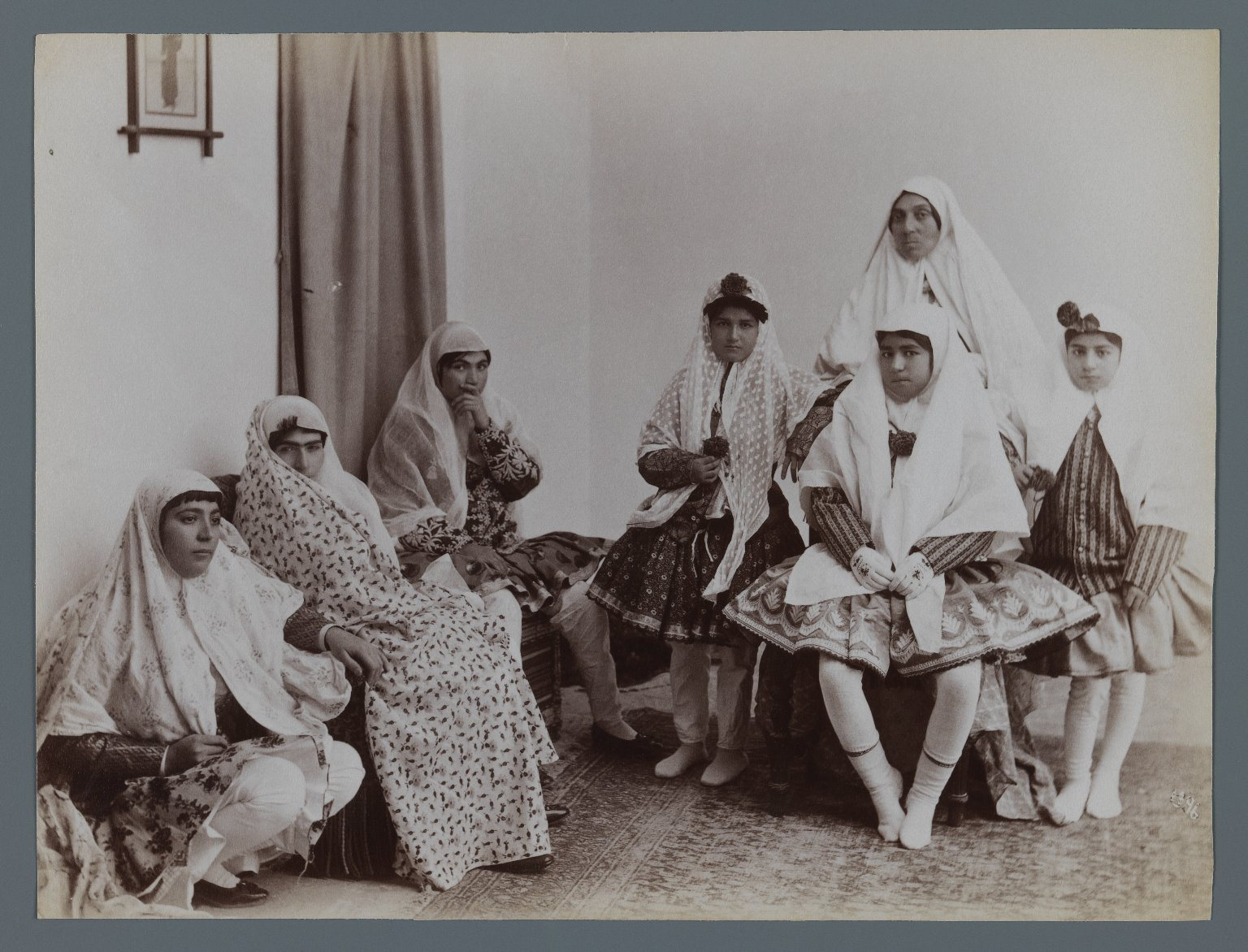
Example of Qajar-period Chārqad

The Chārqad (Persian: چارقَد) was a square head covering made from a light, thin lace fabric that was folded twice diagonally to form a triangle and worn as the principal women's head covering in the Qajar period. It was placed over the head from its midpoint so that the apex of the triangle fell down the back to the end of the spine, while the remaining two corners were brought forward beneath the throat and fastened with a clasp, allowing them to hang over the chest and abdomen. Its light construction enabled it to cover both the head and upper body while remaining comfortable for everyday wear. From the reign of Naser al-Din Shah onward, the chārqad replaced the kolāhak and shāl-āvīz as the principal head covering of women in the andarūn, regardless of social rank or status. During the same period, Naser al-Din Shah's preference for thick white textiles contributed to the popularity of white chārqads among women of the court.

The simple kolāh (Persian: کلاه; hat) was the standard form of male headgear in the Qajar period and typically took the form of a round black cap worn by men across social classes. A prominent variant was the Hashtarkhani (Persian: هشترخانی), also known as Hāji-Tarkhani (Persian: حاجی‌طرخانی), a tall black kolāh angled at the top and covered along the slanted surface with striped fabric. These caps were commonly constructed dressed animal skin, often sourced from Bukhara, and were characterized by stiff, vertically rising walls and a subtly tapering, conical tip that could be sewn or reinforced with red velvet.

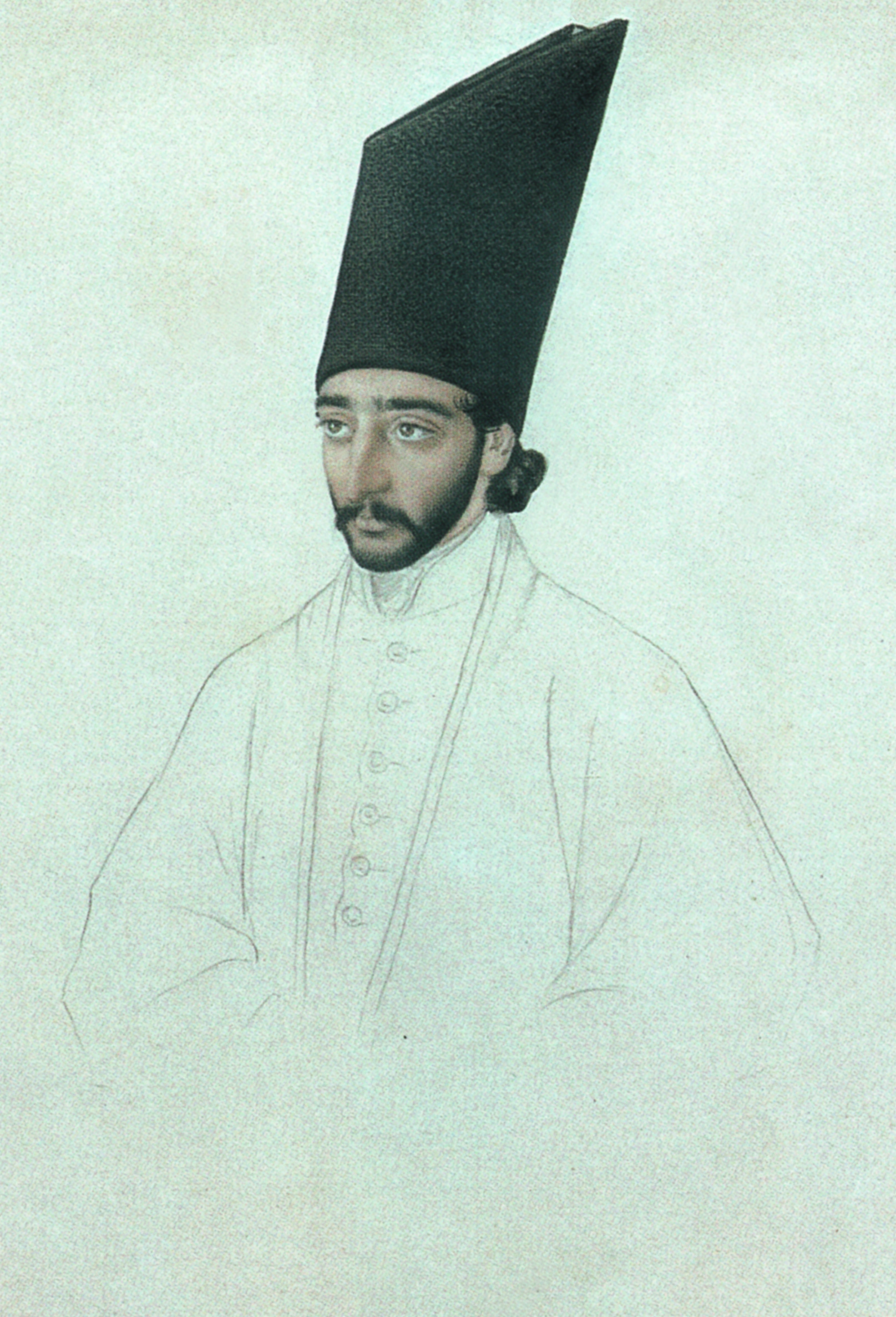
Example of kolāh-e Hashtarkhani

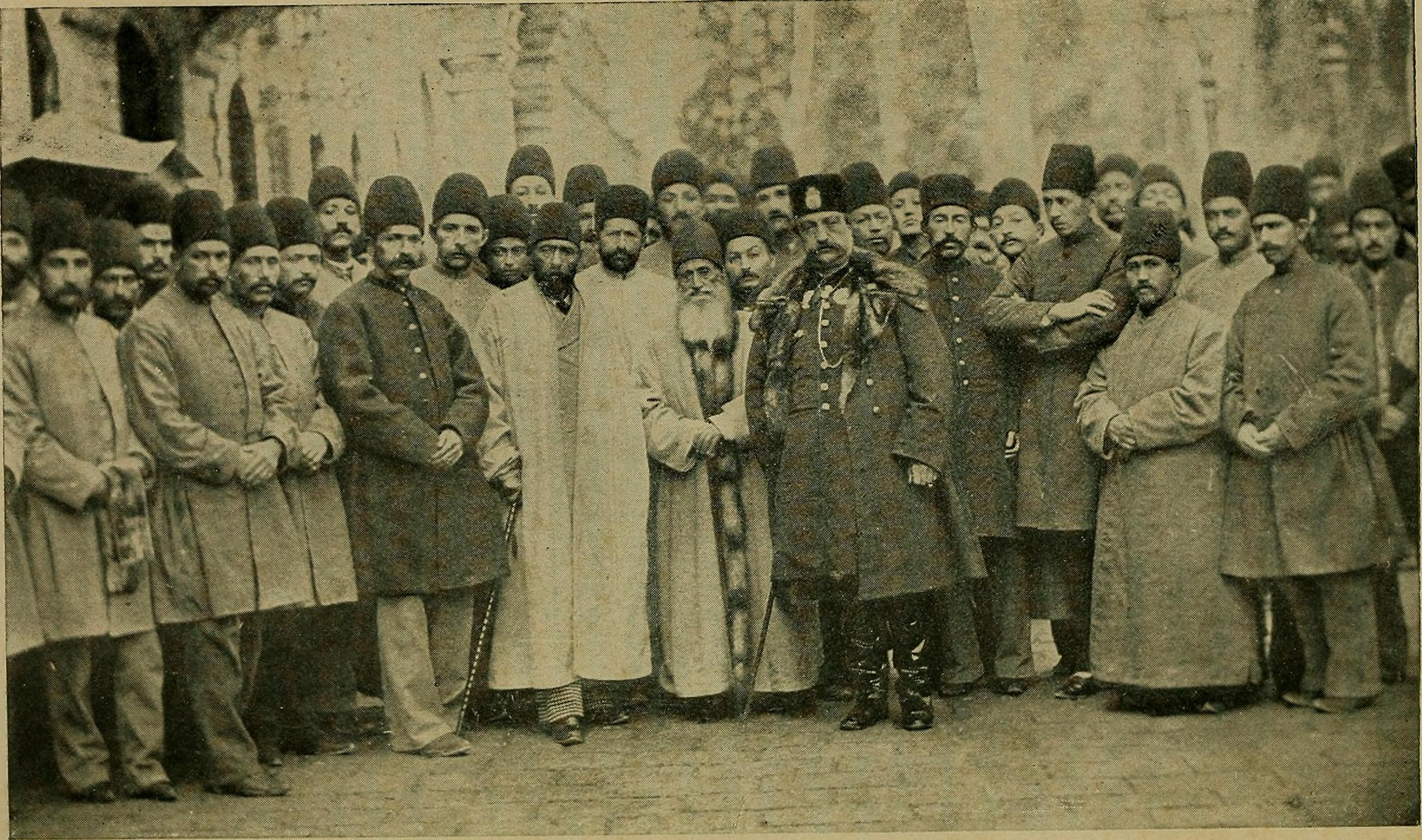
Iranian men in the Qajar era along with Naser al-Din Shah, all wearing the signature Kolāh namadi

Social differentiation was expressed through material quality rather than basic form, as wealthier individuals wore Hashtarkhani kolāhs while ordinary people more often wore the kolāh-e namadi, a cheaper felt version. The Hashtarkhani variant was typically pointed, tall, and black, while namadi versions were more rounded and associated with rural populations and peasants. Structurally, felt kolāhs were made from sheep, camel, or goat hair compressed with heat and water, with binders such as starch, oil, grease, eggs, or soap used in the molding process, and the term kolāh-e namadi primarily referred to the egg-shaped felt type. Later versions of kolāhs were often named after patrons or trend-setters who popularized particular styles.

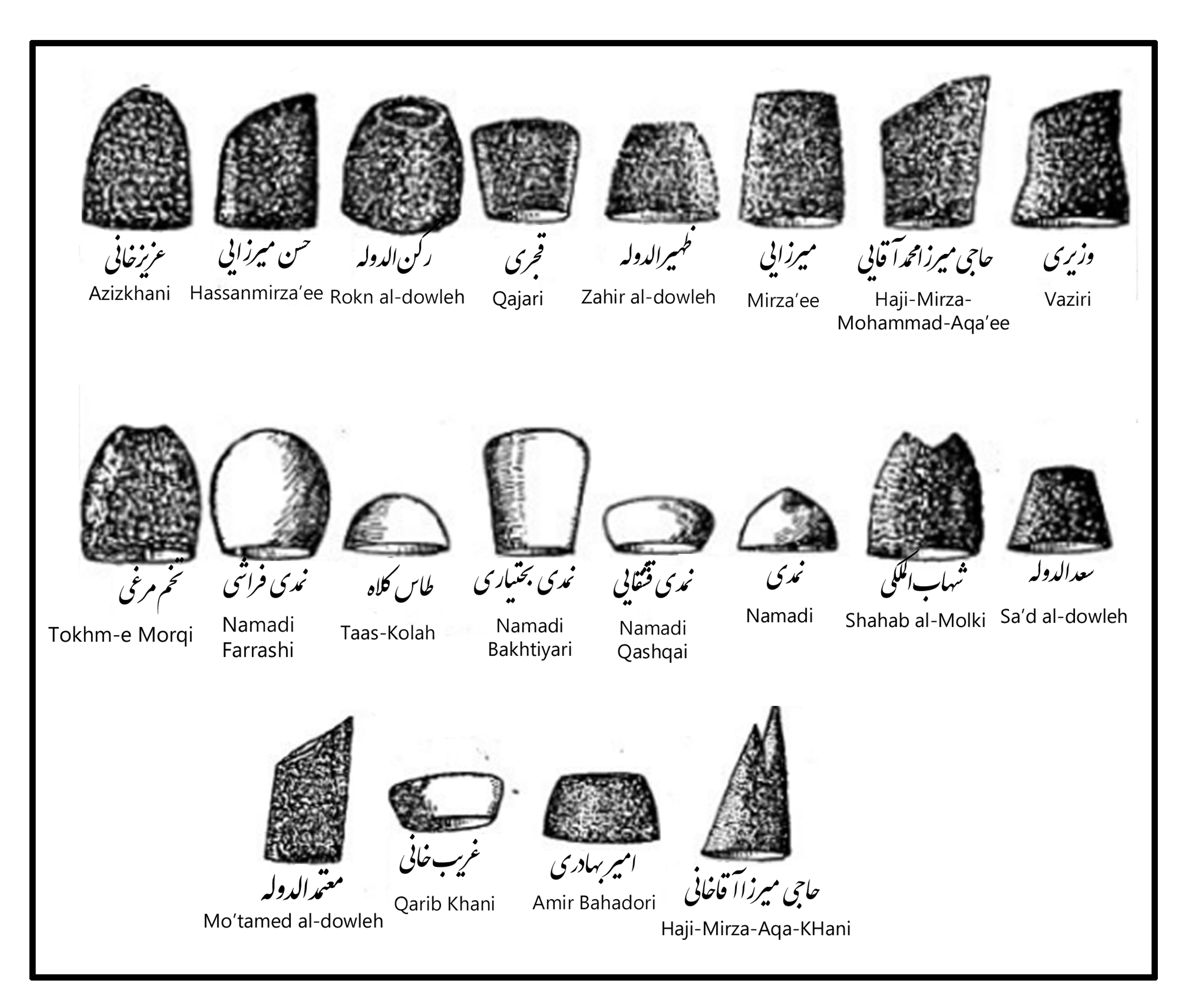
Various styles of Qajar-period Kolāh

In the Qajar era, tall black kolāhs replaced earlier turbans as the dominant form of headwear, a change associated with the dress reforms of Aqa Mohammad Khan Qajar, which aimed to promote national unity and reduce visible class distinctions. While all men were expected to wear kolāhs, variations in the quality of skins distinguished social rank, with the Shah’s kolāh made from newborn lambskin and elite men sometimes wrapping embroidered Kashmir shawls around their hats for distinction. Contemporary observers and later commentators note that headwear carried strong symbolic weight in Iranian culture, with going bareheaded considered disrespectful, and those unable to afford a kolāh covering their heads with cloth or shawls instead. Over time, under Western influence, the height of the kolāh was gradually reduced to approximately fifteen to twenty centimeters, despite resistance from the population, who continued to regard the taller kolāh as a sign of rank and social status.

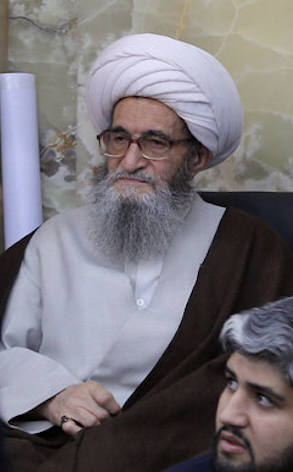
Example of qomī style amāmeh

The amāmeh (Persian: عمامه) is a piece of cloth that Shiʿi clerics wrap around the head. The turban is regarded as a distinctive garment of Shiʿite religious authority and is tied in two colors: black for sayyids and white for non-sayyids. Turbans are wrapped in various ways depending on their form and size and the method of tying; on this basis they are classified into several types. These include: tabarestānī, qomī, najafī, and arabī.

The amāmeh-gozārī (turban-donning) ceremony is a ritual according to which every seminary student, after completing the preliminary stages of study (five years of education) and fulfilling specific scholarly and ethical requirements, is recognized in a ceremony under the title of "talabbos" and formally identified as a cleric. In Iran, this ceremony is conducted under the supervision of the Office for Guidance and Education of the Islamic Seminaries, through the Talabbos Unit, which is responsible for assessing students’ eligibility. Students who meet the conditions of the seminary and demonstrate the required competencies are officially clothed in clerical attire.

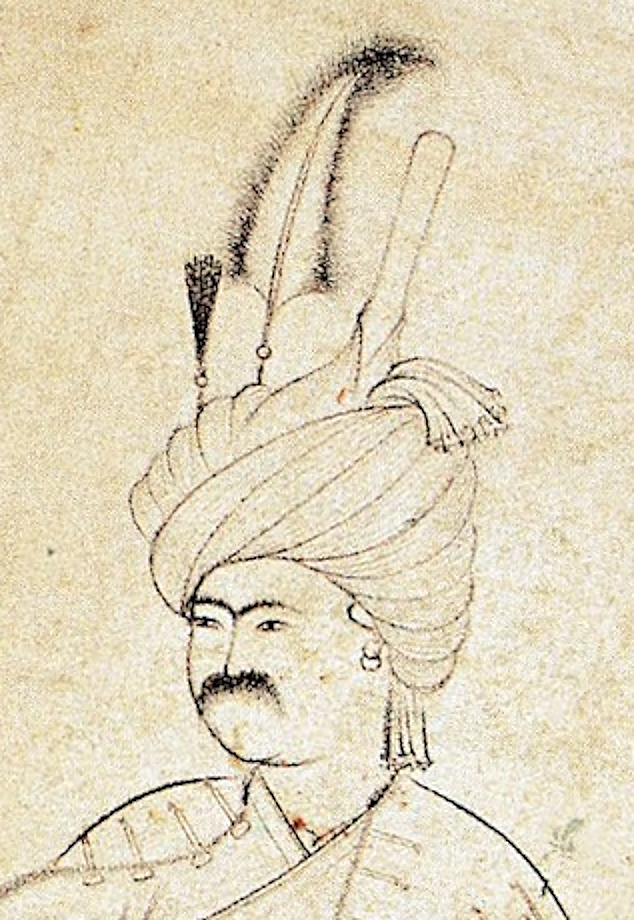
An early rendition of Taj-e Haydari

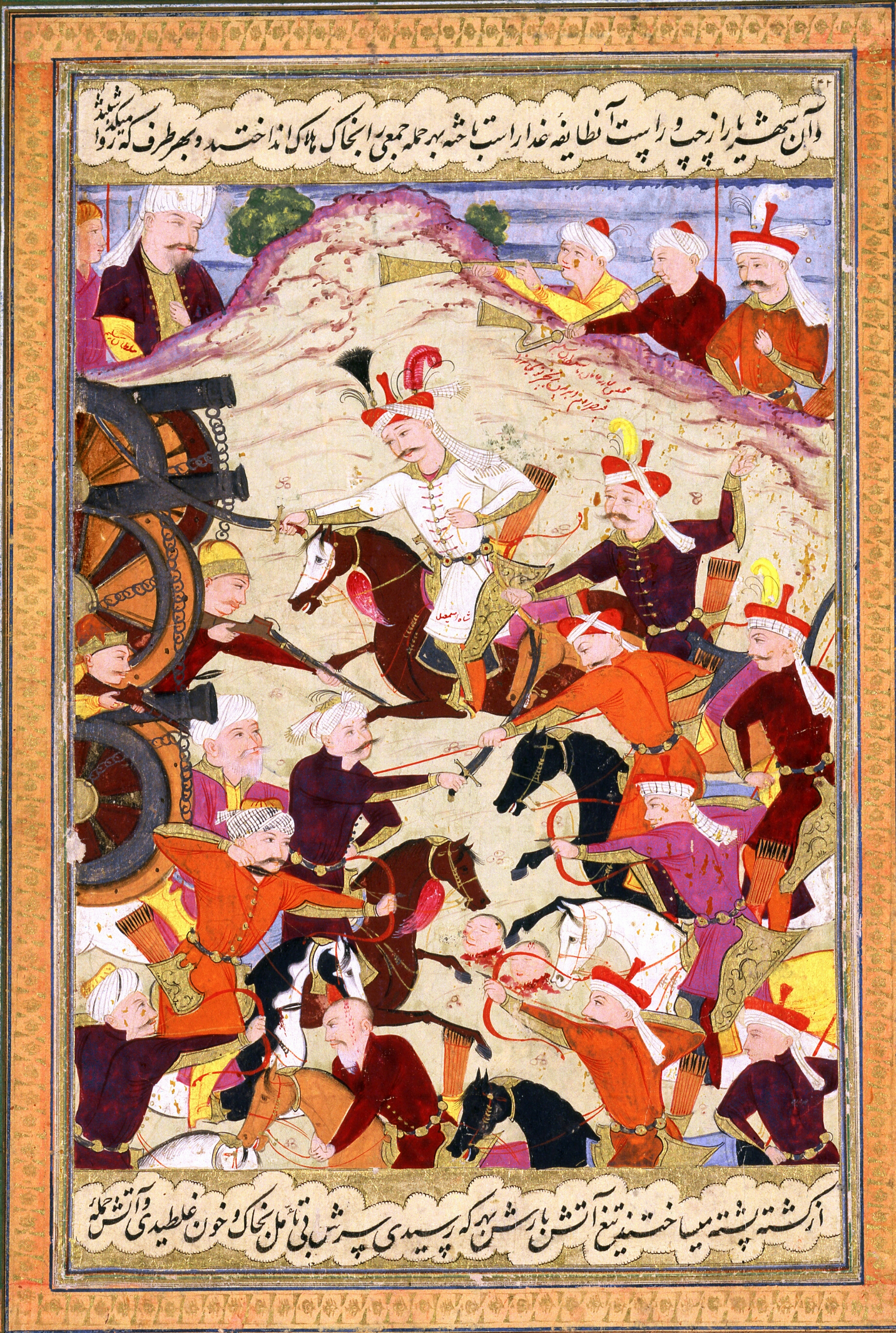
A variant of Taj-e Qizilbash, depicted as a red, apple-shaped cap wrapped thinly by a shāl

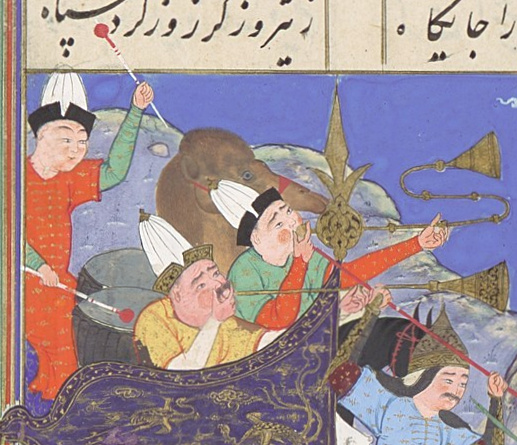
Shahnameh miniature illustrating a taller alternative of the Qalpaq

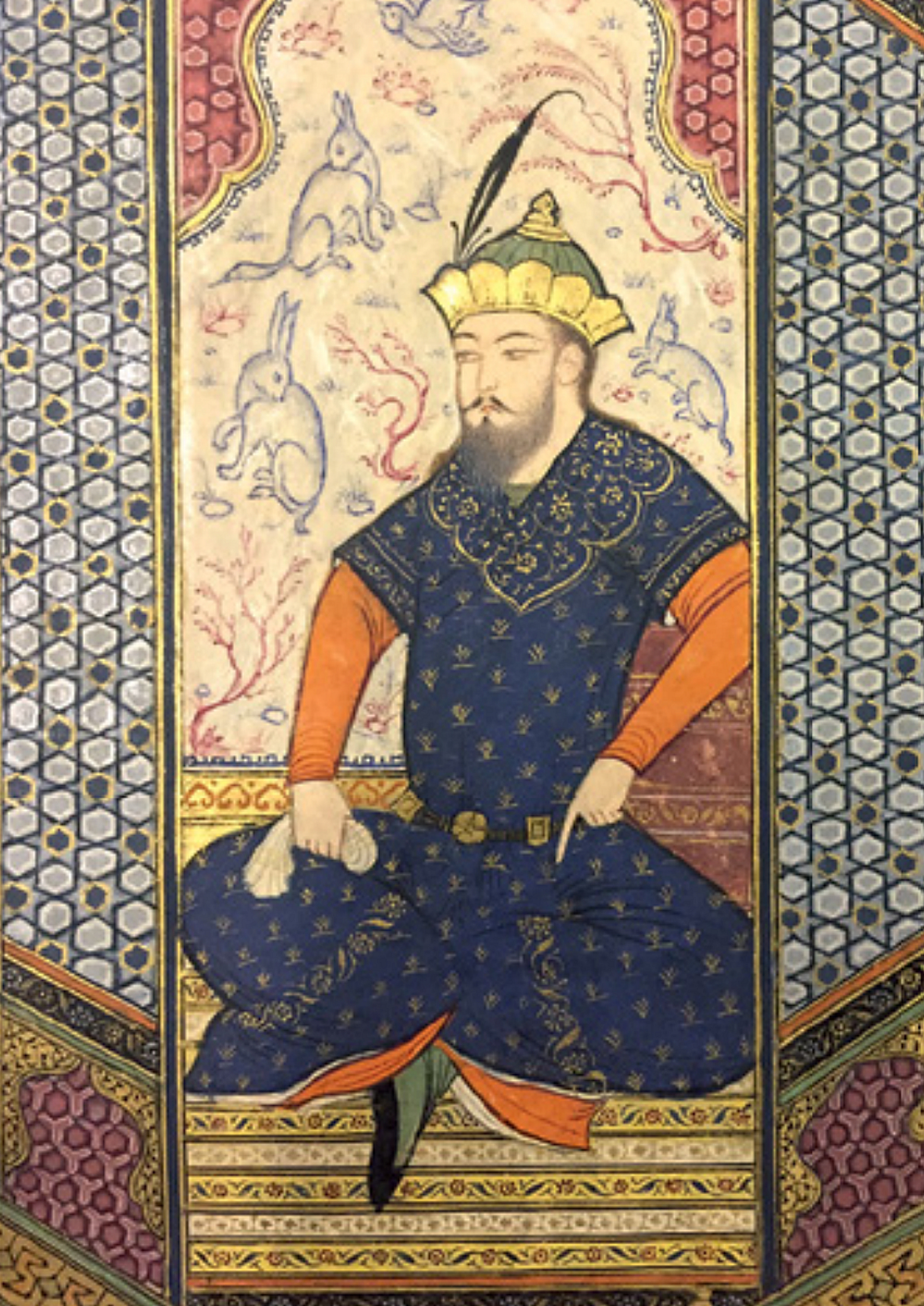
Baysunghur depicted wearing the male form of the Taj-Kolāh

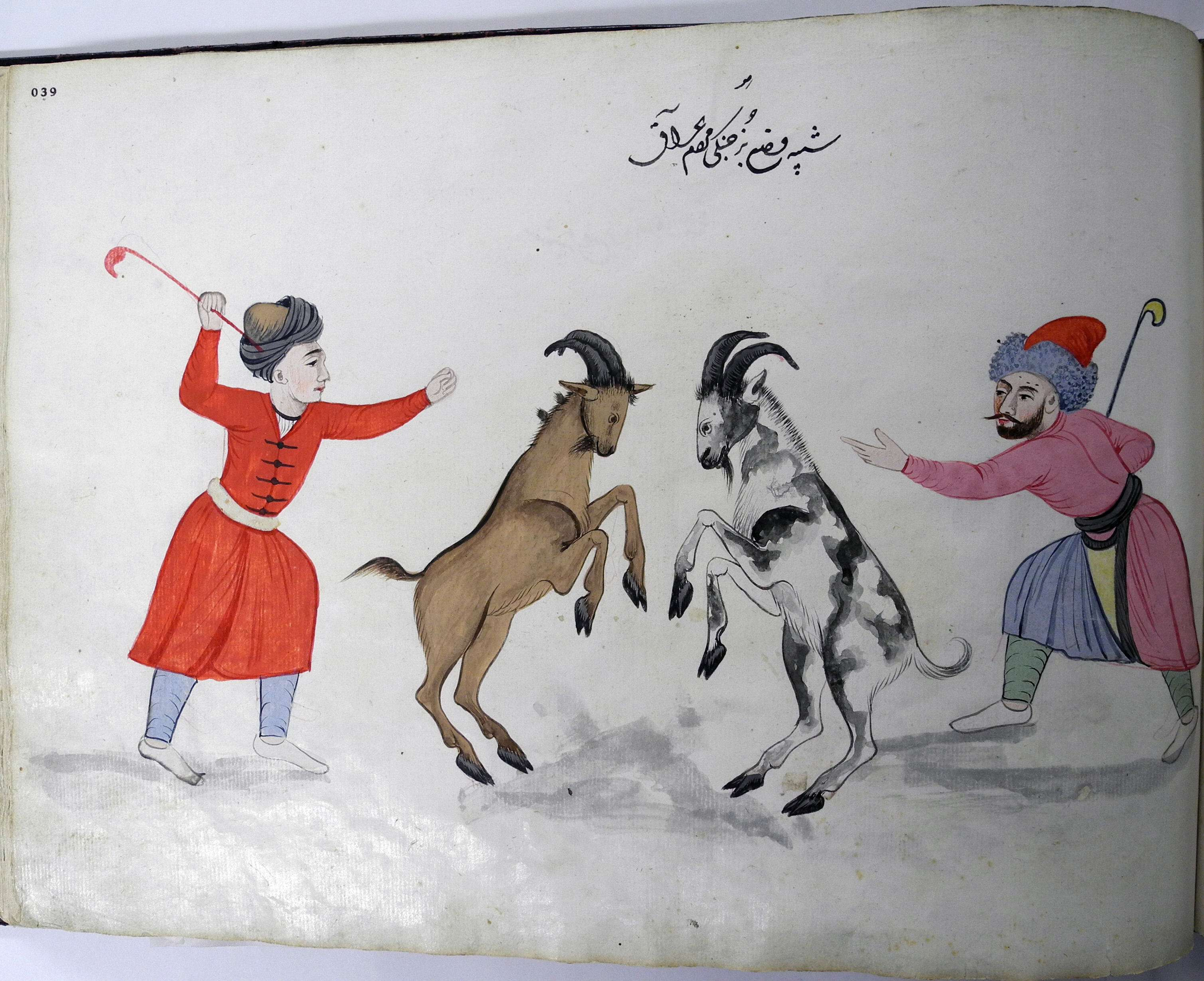
Portrayal of a Bork (left) and a Kolāh-e Buqi (right)

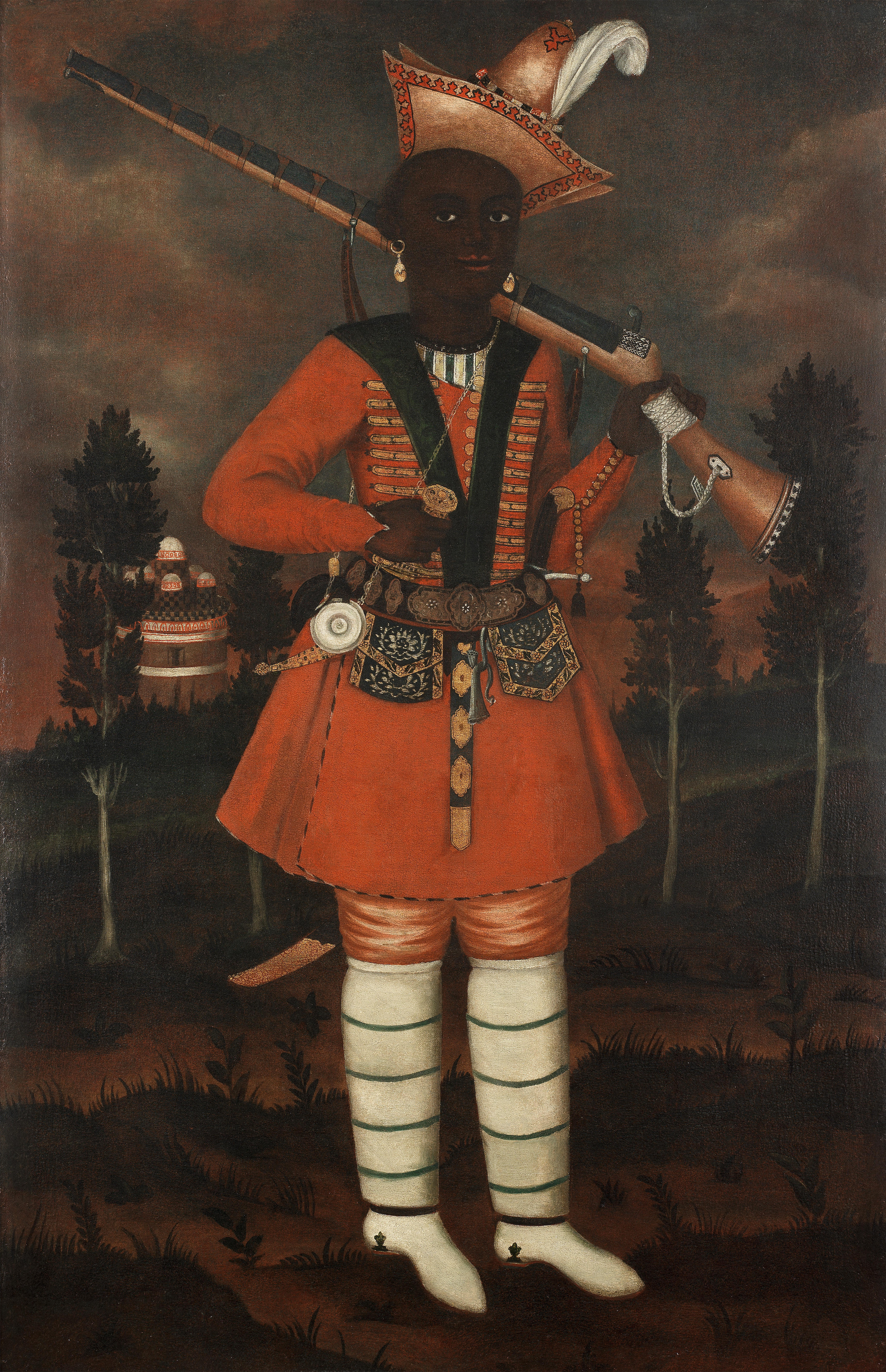
Safavid tofangchi of African descent wearing a decorated Sarajuq

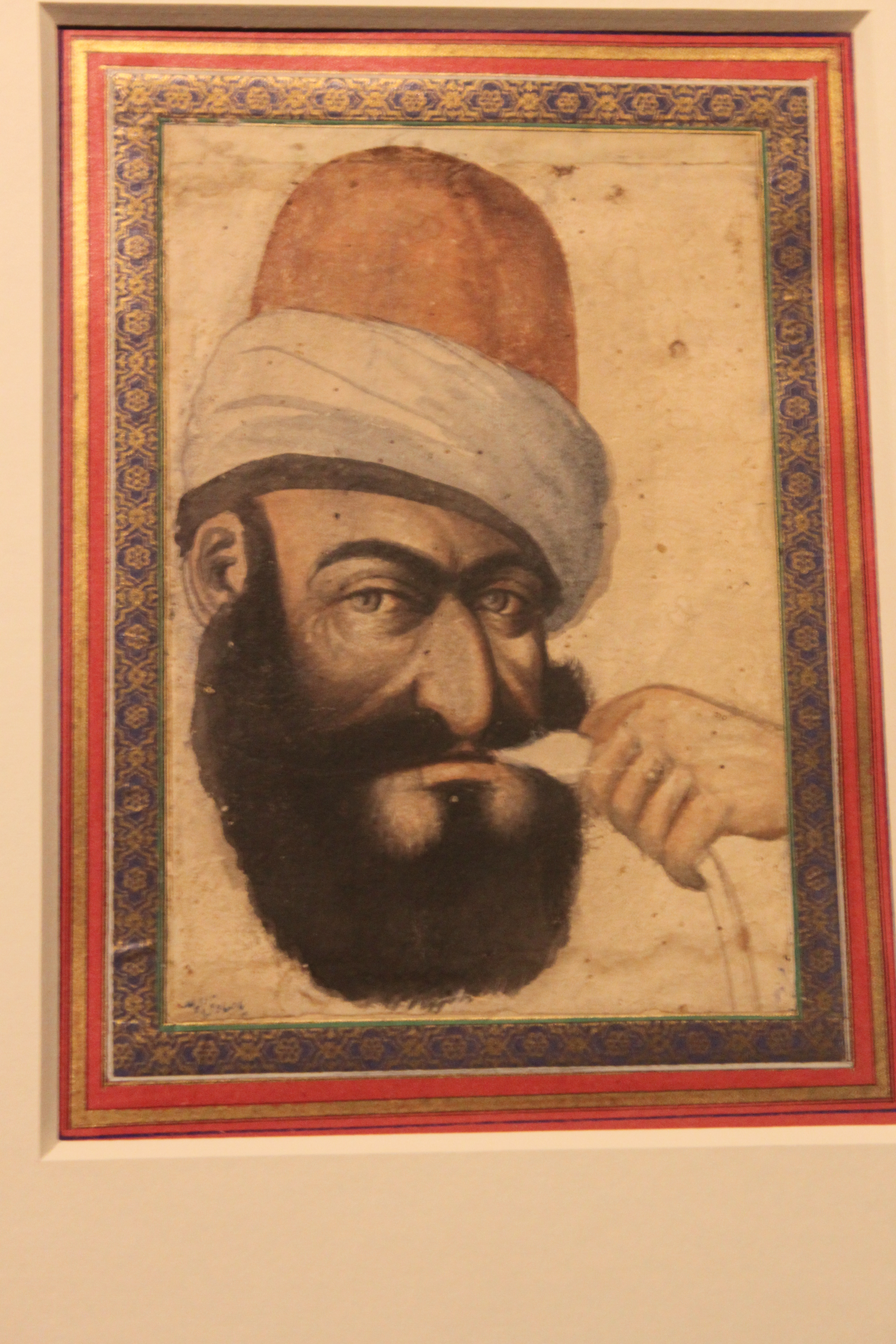
Portrait of Karim Khan Zand wearing an early variation of Shāl-Kolāh

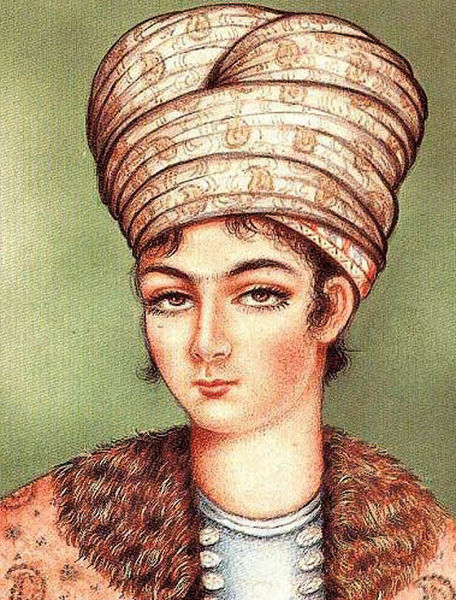
Lotf Ali Khan Zand depicted with a fully wrapped Shāl-Kolāh

=== Bodywear ===
==== Pirahan ====
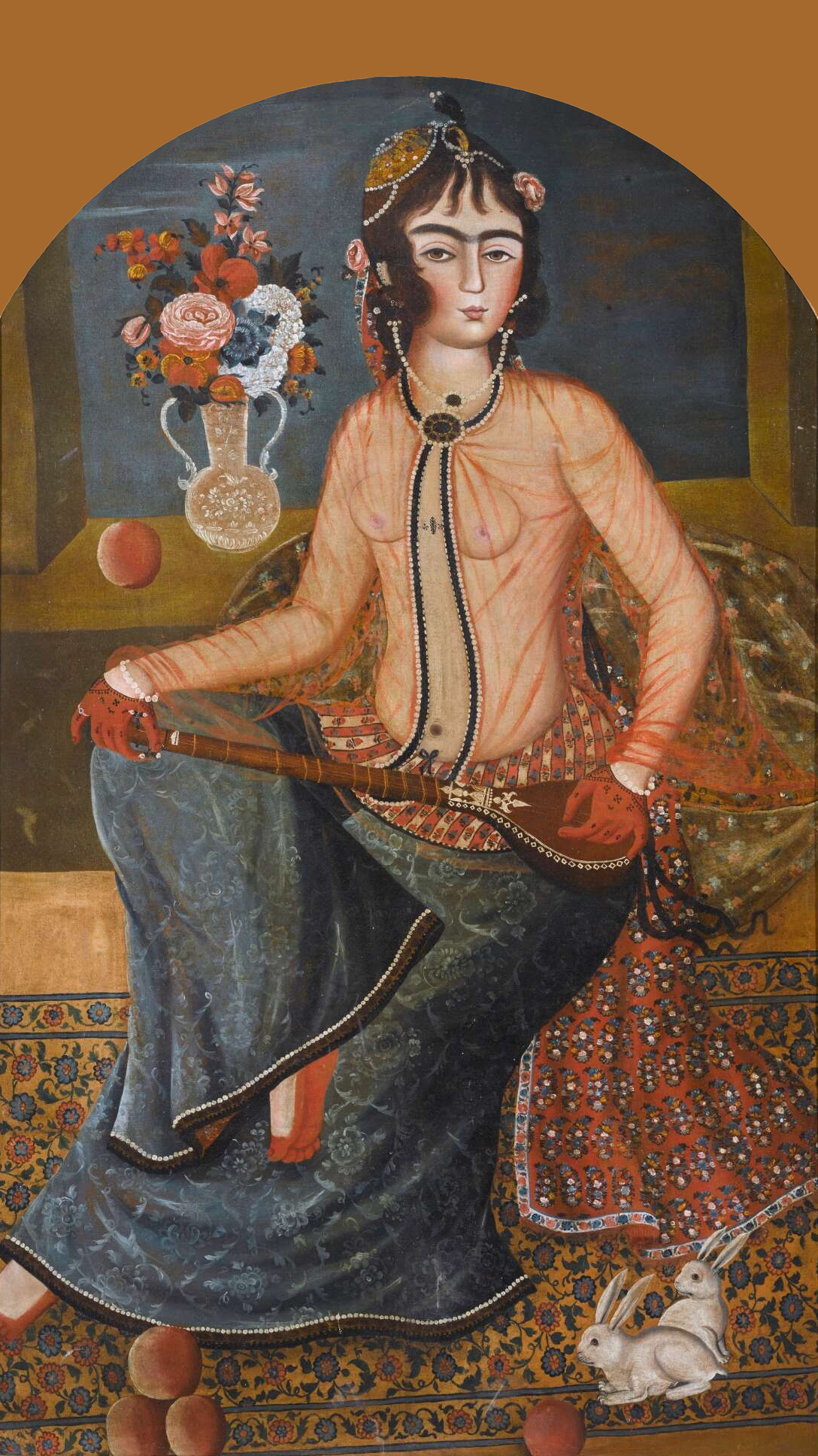
Example of a women's pirāhan

The Pirāhan (Persian: پیراهن) was the innermost garment worn by both men and women throughout the Afsharid, Zand, and Qajar periods, and its basic cut remained largely unchanged despite minor alterations in sleeves and necklines under European influence. It was commonly made from linen, cotton, or fine silk, while women's pirāhans were also woven from muslin and gold or silver brocade. Decoration ranged from plain examples to garments embroidered with black silk, whitework, metallic thread, and occasional sequins. During the Qajar period, pirāhans were frequently produced from thin linen or silk fabrics.Women's pirāhans in the Qajar period were typically close fitting, white in color, and made from very fine, sometimes transparent fabrics. The edges of the garment were often finished with one or two layers of trim, while some examples were further ornamented with delicate floral embroidery. A slit extending from the neckline to the navel exposed the center of the chest and abdomen, allowing multiple jeweled necklaces to remain visible, particularly among elite women.

==== Qaba ====
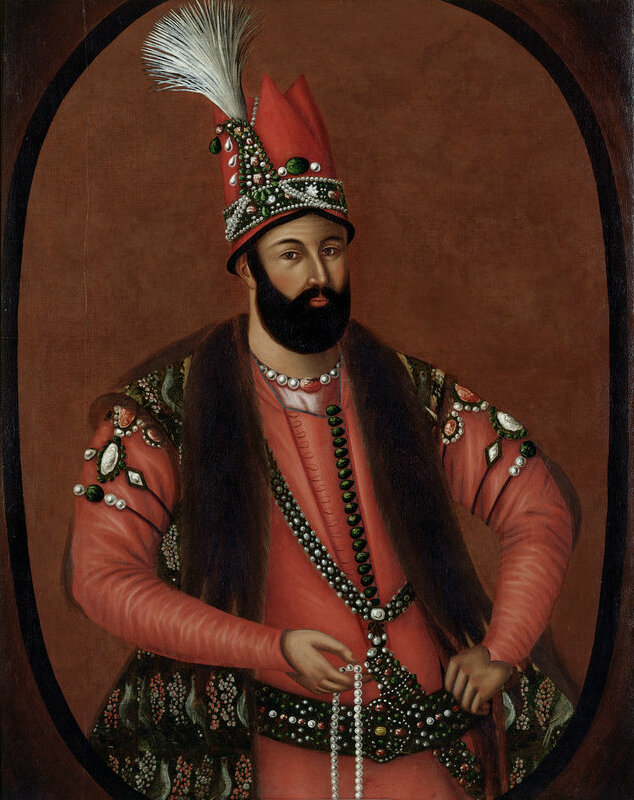
Painting of Nader Shah Afshar with a red qabā - the right front panel has an extended underlap that passes beneath the almond-shaped buttons.

The Qabā (Persian: قَبا) is a traditional Iranian outer garment historically worn by men across different social classes and professions, from Shahs and nobles to clerics, merchants, and farmers. Structurally, it is a long tunic-like coat, open at the front, worn over a shirt and trousers, and sometimes secured with buttons running down the front. Some qabās have hidden buttons under the arm, and others use a belt or sash for fastening. The garment’s sleeves can vary in length and width, and it is often equipped with large inner pockets, which served both practical and ceremonial purposes, such as washing the hem for ritual purity.

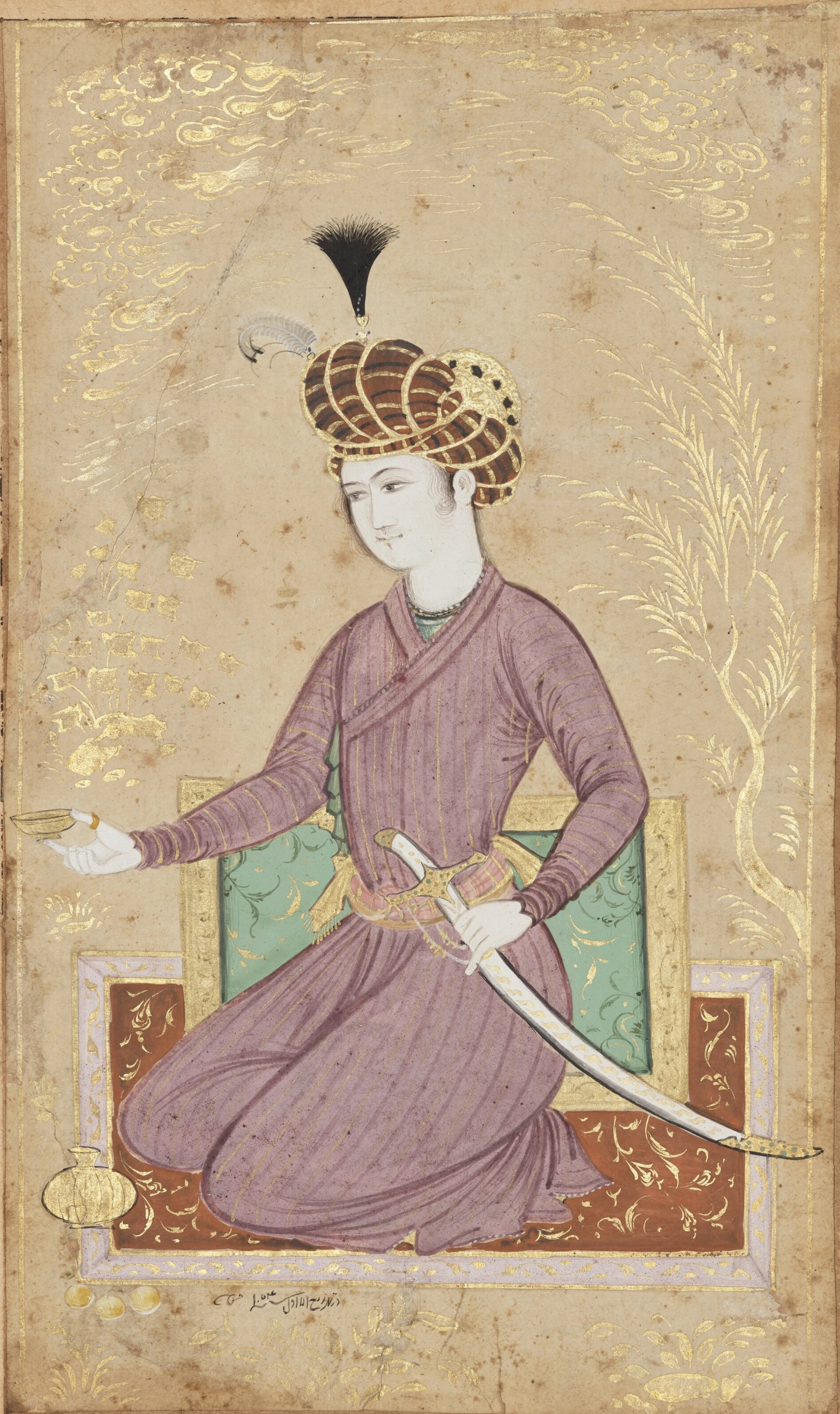
Example of a Safavid Chasbān-Qabā

The Chasbān-qabā (Persian: چسبان قبا) was a fitted Safavid form of qabā associated with court dress. It was a long sleeved and often decorated with floral designs. During the Safavid period, the qabā became progressively shorter. By the seventeenth century, it was fitted over the torso and wrapped from left to right to a buttoned closing under the armpit and its long narrow sleeves were either pushed up over the wrist or turned back and buttoned. The collar could form a V shape or appear as a turn-back collar while some could be furnished with pockets. Alternatively there were buttoned variants, called Qabā-ye dokmeh-dar, long outer garments buttoned down the front.

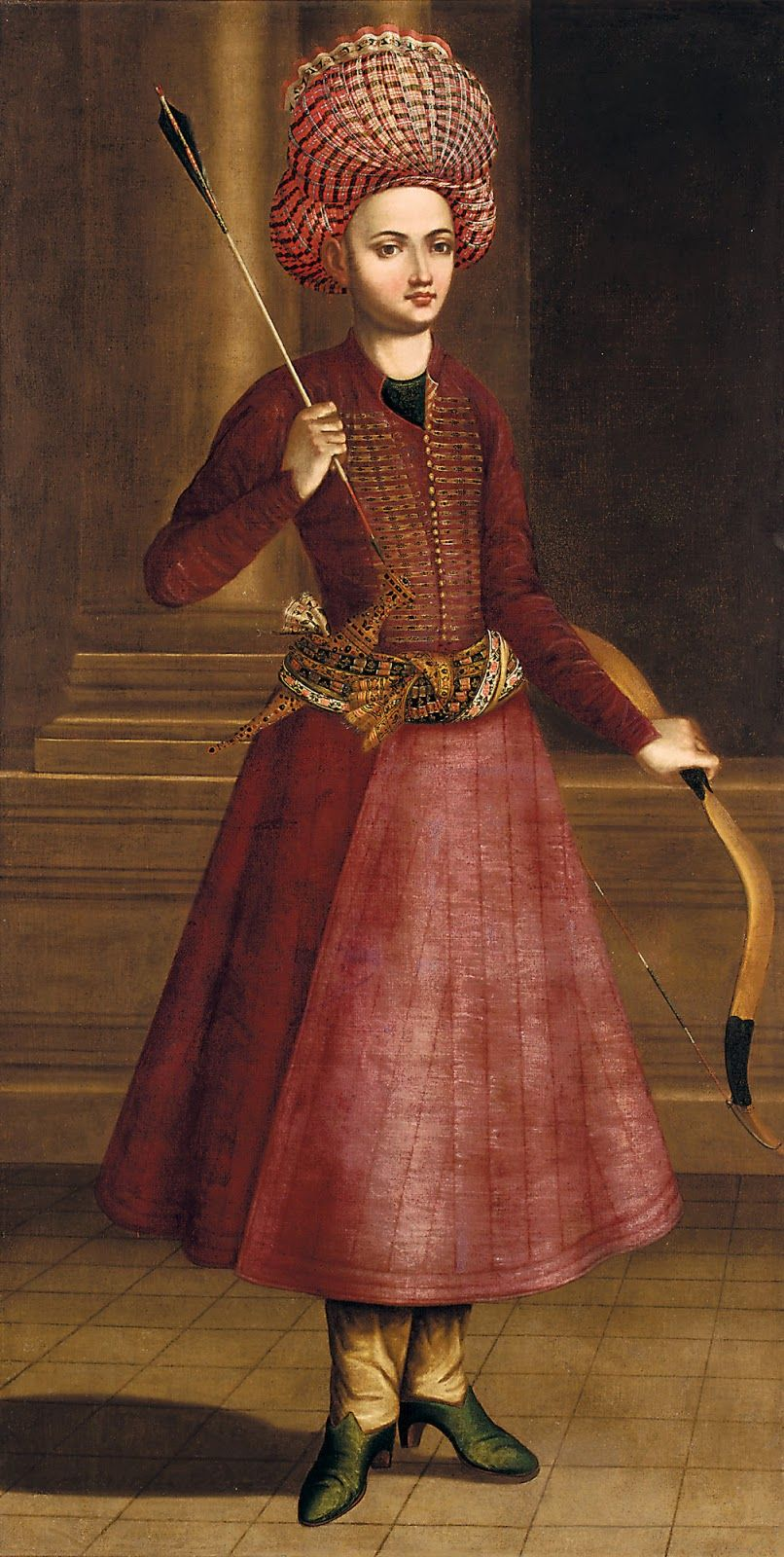
Example of Qabā-ye daman-dar, with a bell-shaped skirt and buttons decorated with Georgian loops

Some buttoned qabās were cut in the Georgian manner, buttons elaborately decorated with straight loops extending horizontally. The buttoned qabā from the late Safavid to early Qajar was worn open at the front, a visible panel extending beneath the buttoned side, creating the appearance of a secondary layer integrated under the garment, with later 18th and 19th century examples featuring heavy almond-shaped buttons made of precious metals. A skirted form of the buttoned qabā, called Qabā-ye daman-dar was introduced during the reign of Shah Abbas I. It was fitted over the torso, stiffened at the hips and wrists with quilting and had pointed cuffs, with he bottom half flailing down into a bell-shaped skirt. It could have round turn-back, or qalama (straight) collars. The qabā in the Qajar court and was closely associated with elite male appearance and regalia. It was commonly worn together with jeweled armbands known as bāzū-band (Persian: بازوبند), which functioned as a notable accessory of rank, while the Shah and his nobles favored full beards and moustaches carefully dyed black for visual effect when worn in conjunction with the qabā. Courtly versions of the garment were often accompanied by long embroidered shirts with jewel-encrusted sleeves, as well as collars and hems densely set with gems, emphasizing display and hierarchy.

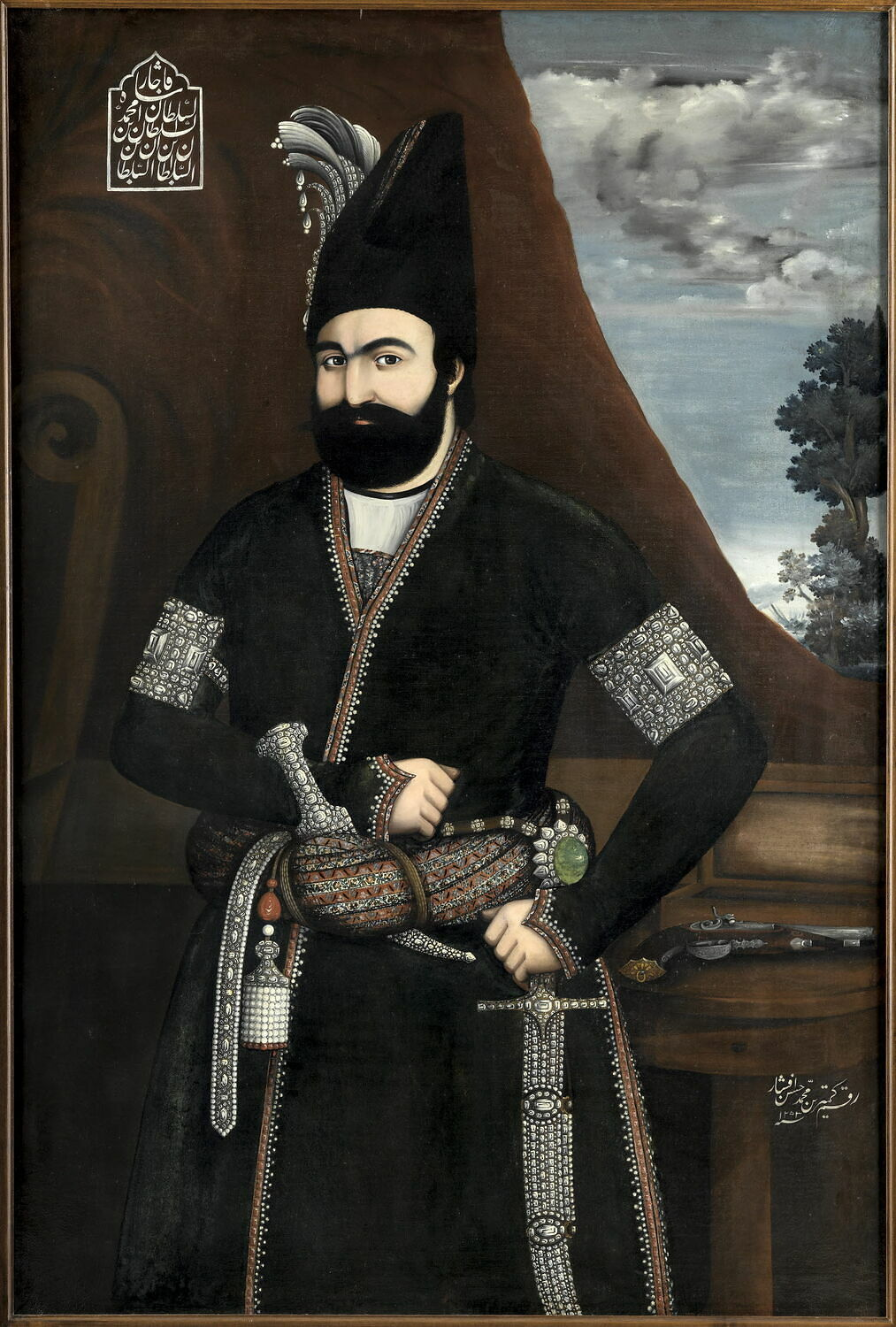
Mohammad Shah Qajar, wearing a Chasbān-Qabā decorated with jeweled bāzū-bands and a thick kamarband holding various items

The qabā was distinguished from the jobbeh by the presence of a Kamarband (Persian: کمربند) or shāl (Persian: شال), a waist wrapping worn by Iranian men to complete the outer garment and functioned both as a sash and as a practical means of carrying personal belongings. Men commonly wrapped around the waist a chāhārgazi (Persian: چهارگَزی) measuring four cubits in length, and wealthier individuals tied over it an additional silk sash known as a shāl. The shāl was usually made from fine cloth and wrapped around the waist in two or three layers. Its width generally did not exceed four fingers, and when wound around the waist it formed a broad continuous pocket suitable for carrying objects. The kamarband also served practical and occupational functions. Inside the chāhārgazi, men commonly placed daggers, knives, and handkerchiefs. Scribes carried writing implements within the folds of the shāl, including pen cases, whetstones for sharpening knives, and paper for writing. Contemporary observers compared this use of the sash to the Russian custom of storing belongings inside boots. The kamarband was used exclusively with the qabā and served both functional and symbolic purposes. In its earlier Qajar form, the garment was worn with a long hem reaching to the ankles, with the upper section fitted closely to the waist and the lower portion flaring outward to fall in the form of a skirt. During the reign of Naser al-Din Shah, the hem length was progressively reduced to above the knee, and multiple variants of the qabā came into use, including forms reaching the ankles or calves as well as shorter versions. Some qabās opened from the side or from the front right and were fastened with a waist sash, while others were adorned with decorative buttons, and sleeves in certain examples became narrow and tightly fitted, reflecting changing fashions within the court.

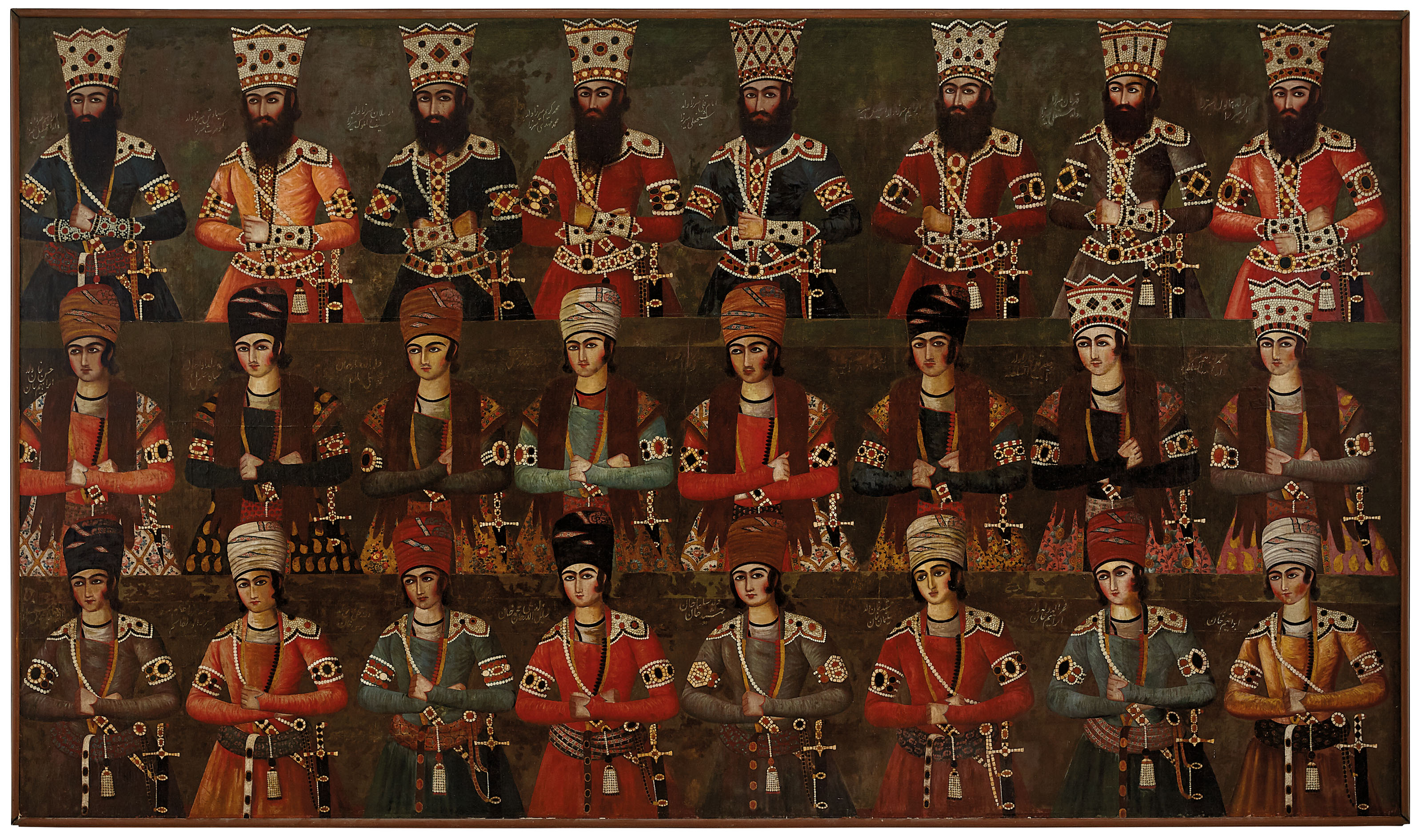
Examples of Qajar qabās pearl-decorated cloud collars and the front left open, showing the extended flap

Qabā fabrics varied according to climate and social rank. In winter, thicker and warmer materials like wool were common, while lighter fabrics like cotton and linen were used in summer. Wealthier individuals often wore qabās made of silk, velvet, or fine wool. There were seasonal variations too: light “spring” or “summer” qabās (Bahāri, Persian: بهاری) and heavier “autumn” or “winter” ones (Zemestāni, Persian: زمستانی). Fabrics such as Atlas, Zari, and imported European materials were used for elite garments.

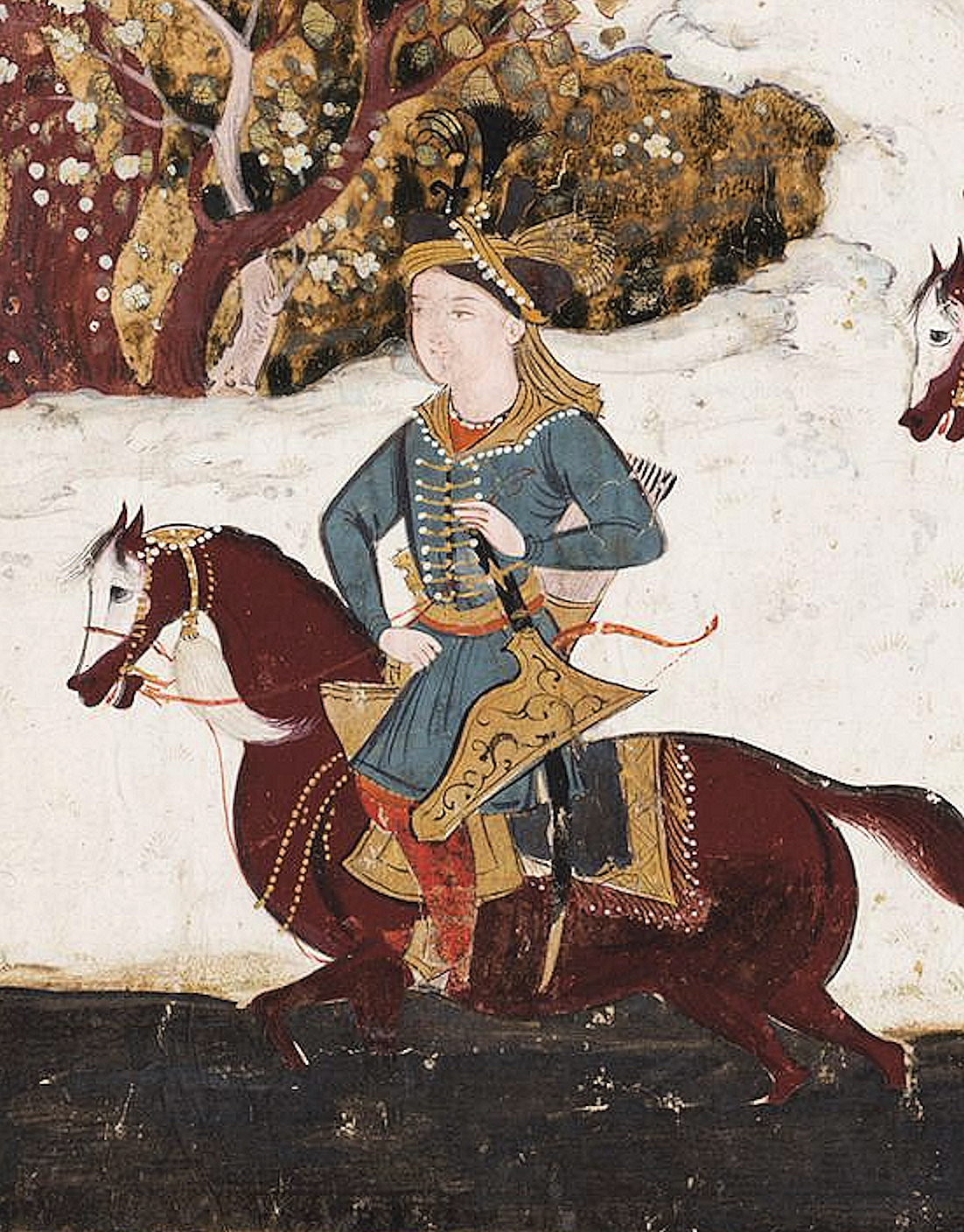
Shah Ismail I wearing a qabā with an early Qizilbash-style gilded cloud collar

The colors of qabās also reflected status. Black or dark hues were common among clerics, while affluent men often chose bright colors like green, blue, or gold. Among the general populace, subdued tones were prevalent for practicality. The qabā was a unifying garment in Iranian culture, worn by virtually all men regardless of class, though with significant variation in fabric quality and decoration. It served as a marker of respectability and was often bestowed as a Khil'at to dignitaries, officials, or as diplomatic gifts. Qajar qabās were generally produced in monochrome colors such as yellow, green, red, blue, and purple and were made of silk or qadak, with textile production centered in Yazd and Kashan. Brocaded fabrics with floral motifs woven in gold and silver thread were especially favored for elite garments. Surviving visual and material evidence, including representations of Fath-Ali Shah, show sleeves heavily embellished with jewels and diamonds, reflecting a conscious tendency to adopt ancient royal models inspired by Sasanian precedents.

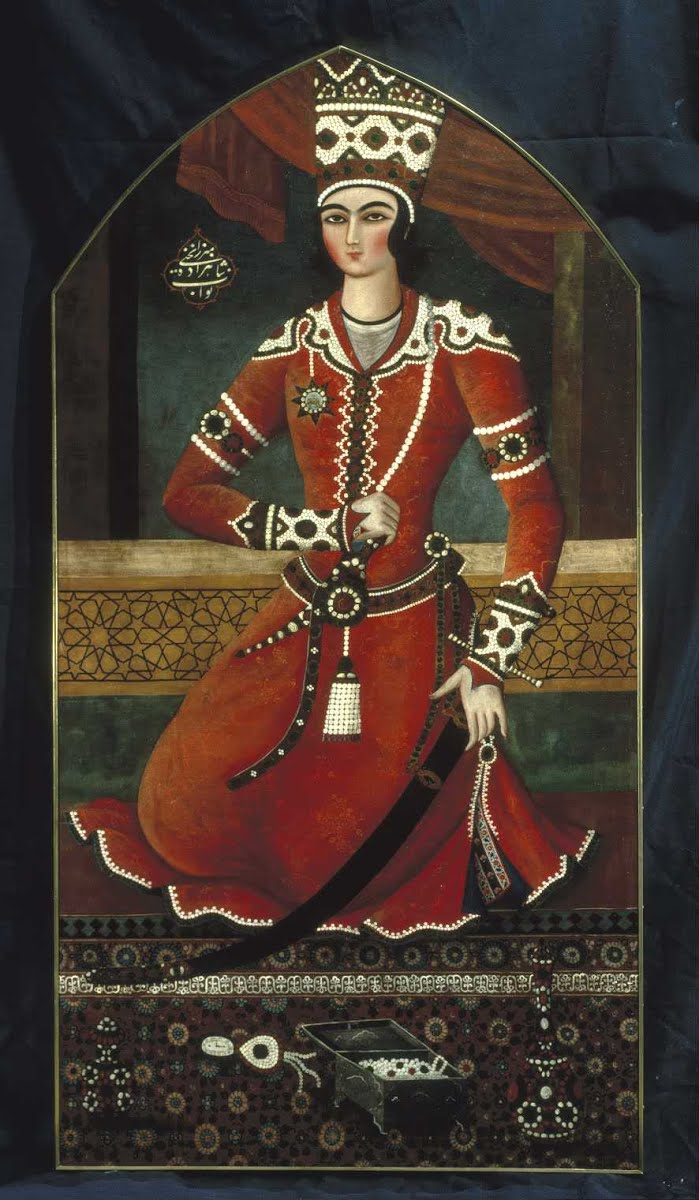
A Qajar qabā with pearl-embroidered buttons, sleeves, armbands and cloud collar

The cloud collar continued from the medieval period, having been introduced into Iranian dress under the Ilkhanate. It survived into the early Safavid period as a conventional lobed ornament, often made from gilded leather and stamped, embroidered, or sewn onto the shoulders. It was associated especially with Qizilbash riders, although by the sixteenth and seventeenth centuries the motif appears to have been increasingly confined to less expensive textiles. In the Qajar period, the cloud collar re-emerged in a far more extravagant form. Velvet collars were densely embroidered and covered with pearls, sometimes so closely set that the underlying fabric was barely visible. Similar pearl decoration could extend along the sleeves from below the elbow to the cuffs, creating a continuous field of ornament. This lavish treatment was characteristic of Qajar court dress more broadly, whose dazzling and highly decorative appearance was frequently remarked upon by European travelers.

==== Rada ====
Radā (Persian: رَدا) is traditionally referring to any upper-body covering such as a cloak, mantle, or robe, typically worn over other clothing like the qabā. In historical Persian sources, it was also used as a general term for garments that drape over the shoulders and cover the body completely, similar to a chādor.

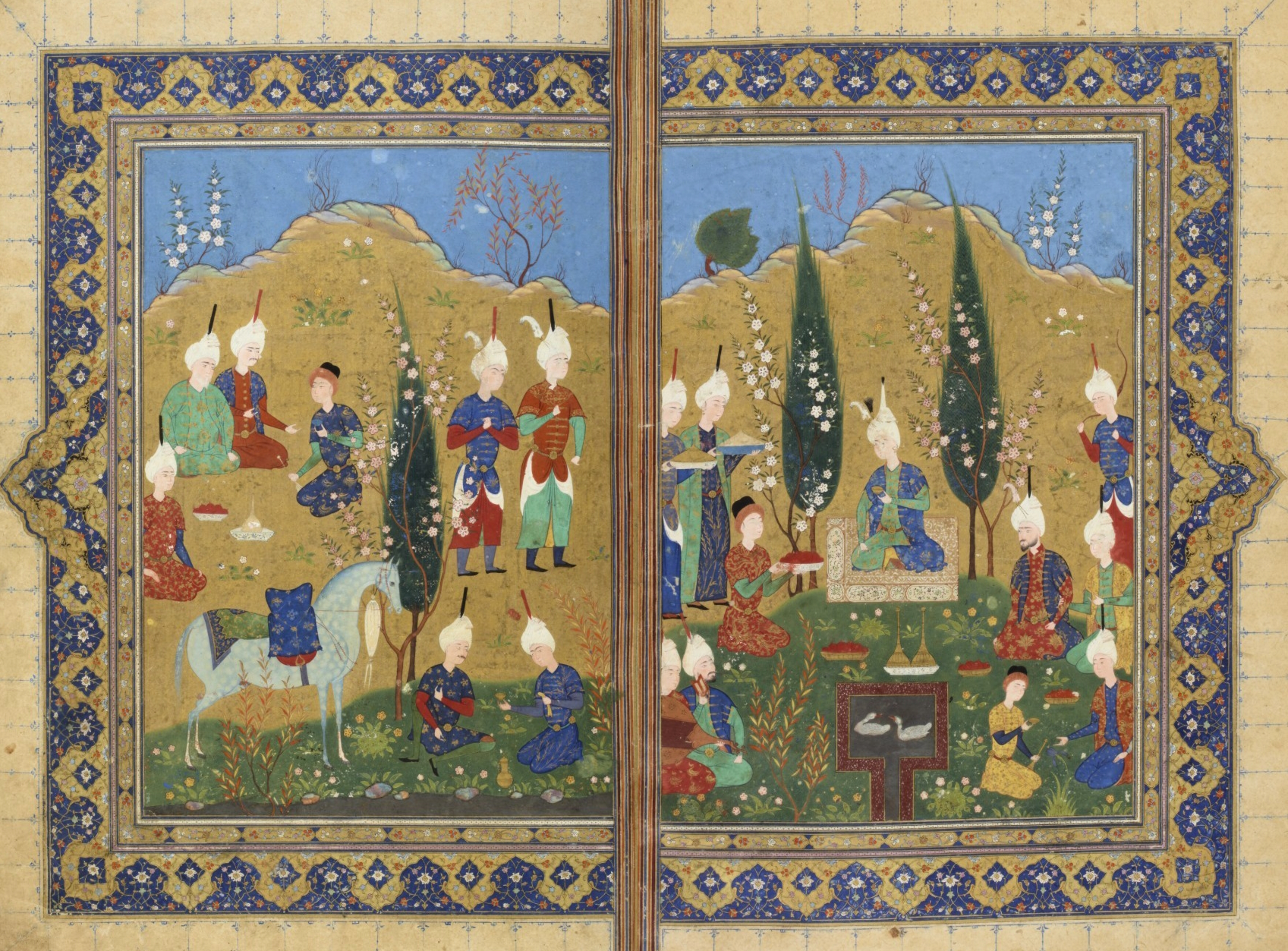
Examples of open and buttoned Safavid Kaftāns, some tucked up into the belt

Kaftān (Arabic: قفطان, qafṭān; Turkish: kaftan; Persian: کفتان) sometimes referred to as Jobbeh, Radā or Bālāpush, was a long, ornate, unlined upper garment made of fabric, regarded as a robe of honor (not to be confused with Khaftān (Persian: خفتان), used to denote a tunic-like gambeson) worn by both men and women. Believed to have originated in ancient Mesopotamia.

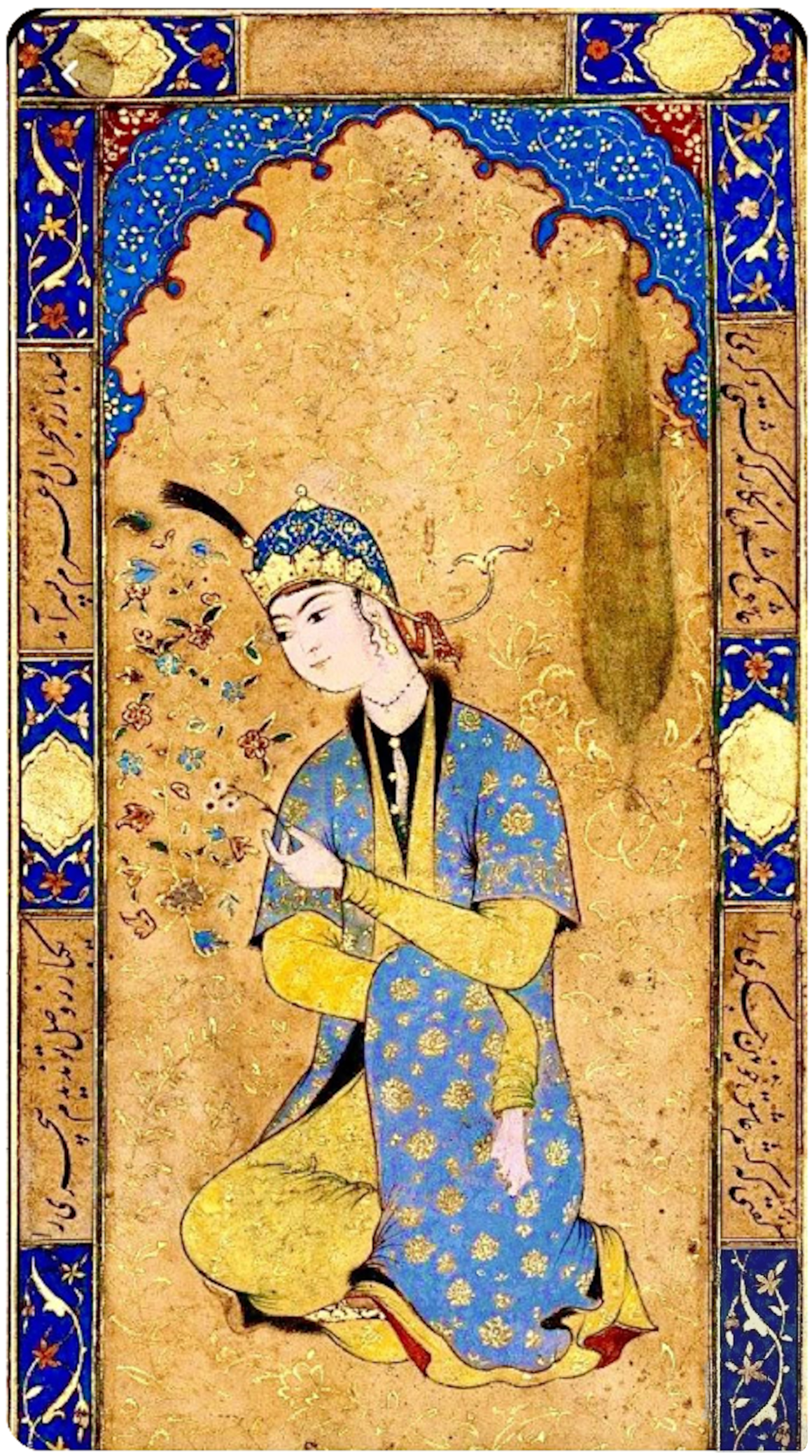
Safavid princess Pari Khan Khanum, wearing an example of Safavid kaftan

It was characterized as a long robe that reached the calves or sometimes fell just below the knee, open at the front and, with sleeves that were slightly shortened at the wrists or even cut back to the mid-arm, sometimes sleeveless, and buttons running down the front. kaftāns featured diverse sleeve styles to display luxury and craftsmanship. Its value was often indicated by the colors, decorative ribbons, and buttons it featured. Many kaftāns crafted from luxurious textiles were adorned with gold-threaded bands and cords along the front and sleeves. The Ottoman sultan and his court wore kaftāns with short sleeves over long-sleeved entari (qabā) to highlight contrasting fabrics. Basic kaftāns had short, kimono-style sleeves, but unlike kimonos, the sleeves and bodice were separate pieces joined with straight seams. Gusset-like patterns curved the underarm, and short sleeves were often curved at the hem, allowing easier elbow movement and revealing the rich inner linings for added visual appeal. Open at the front with side vents, the kaftān showcased ornate linings and facings made from bright fabrics like atlas and taffeta. Collarless versions had bias binding at the neck, while seams were finished with tack and overcast stitching. Decorations included silk cords, and applique techniques, with even unlined kaftāns adorned by trims to cover seams and enhance their luxurious appearance.

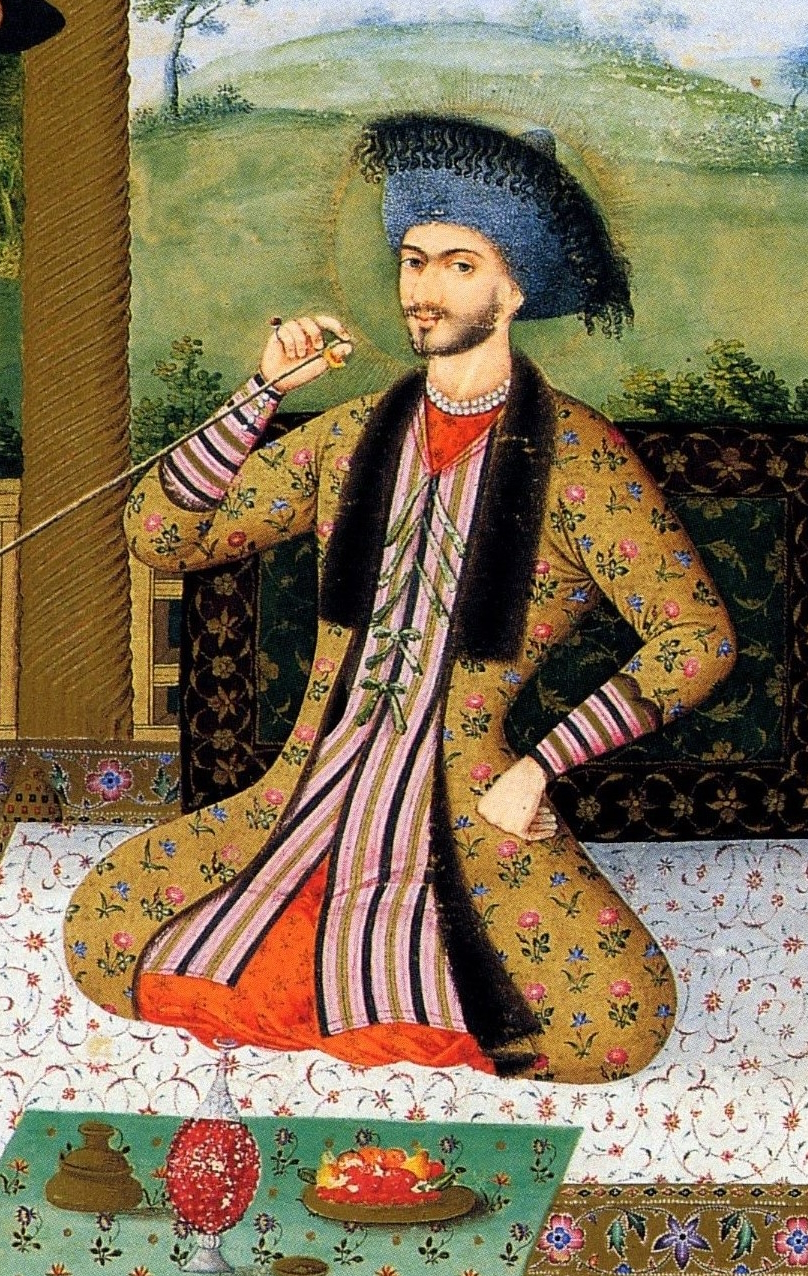
Shah Suleiman I; an example of Safavid kātebi

The Kātebi (Persian: کاتبی; earlier form of the garment later known as the Kolijeh; Persian: کلیجه) was a short outer garment worn in the Safavid, Afsharid, Zand and Qajar period. In Safavid usage, the kātebi was a short jacket with long sleeves, fitted closely over the torso and stiffened at the hips and cuffs through quilting, while the lower portion flared outward to form a bell-shaped skirt. The sleeves could terminate in pointed cuffs, a feature frequently noted in contemporary descriptions. Fur was widely used for lining such jackets and as facing on lapels, with marten and sable imported from Russia and fox fur and sheepskin also commonly employed.

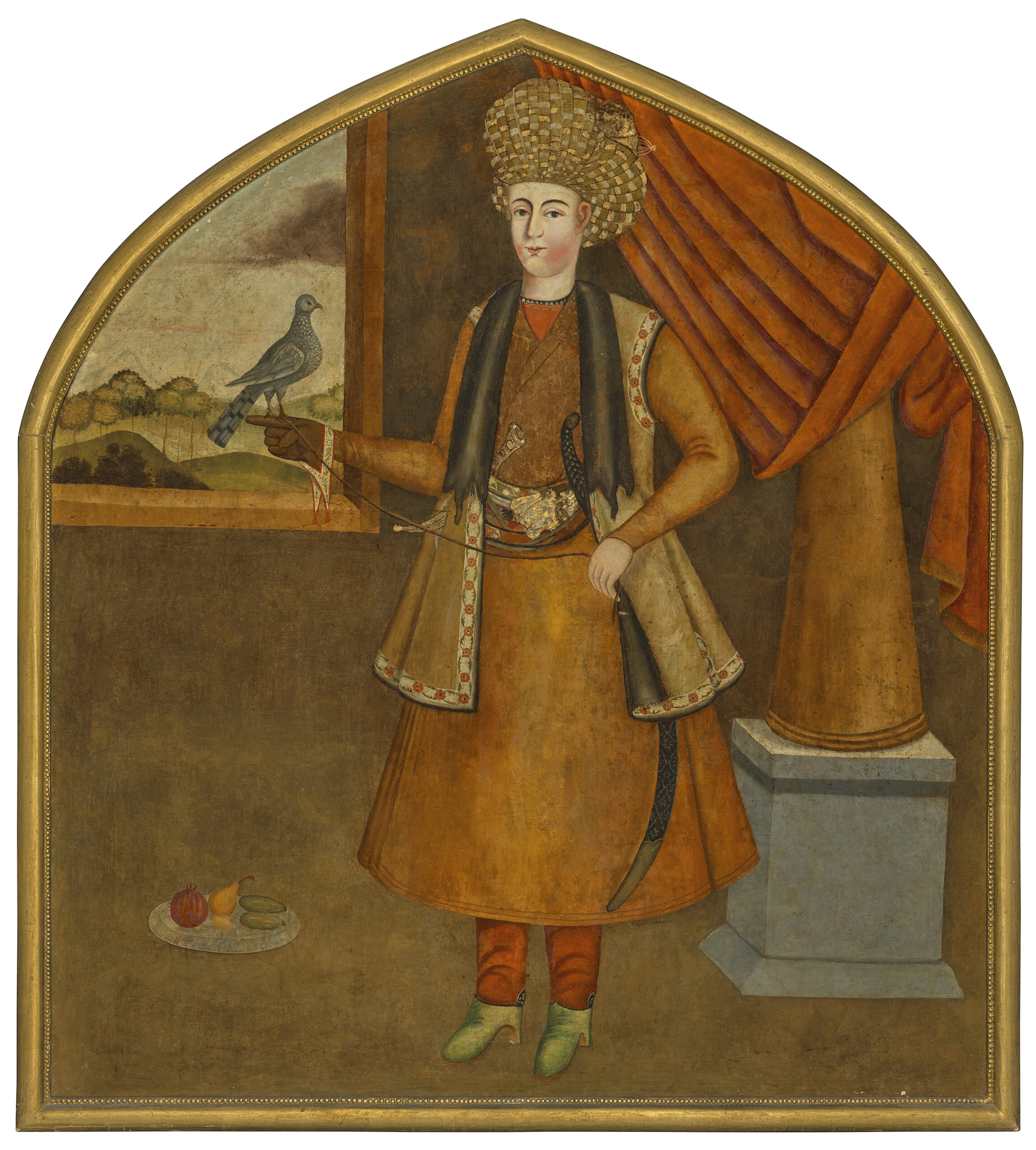
Example of a Safavid Kordi

By the eighteenth century and thereafter, decorative schemes increasingly favored floral boteh motifs and stripes, which were applied prominently along the sleeves and the slits of the skirt, enhancing the visual richness of outer garments such as the kātebi. The short fur-lined outer coat and related robes with long, pointed sleeves are repeatedly described in Safavid and early modern accounts as characteristic elements of elite dress. The sleeveless variation of a kātebi was referred to as a Kordi (Persian: کُردی).

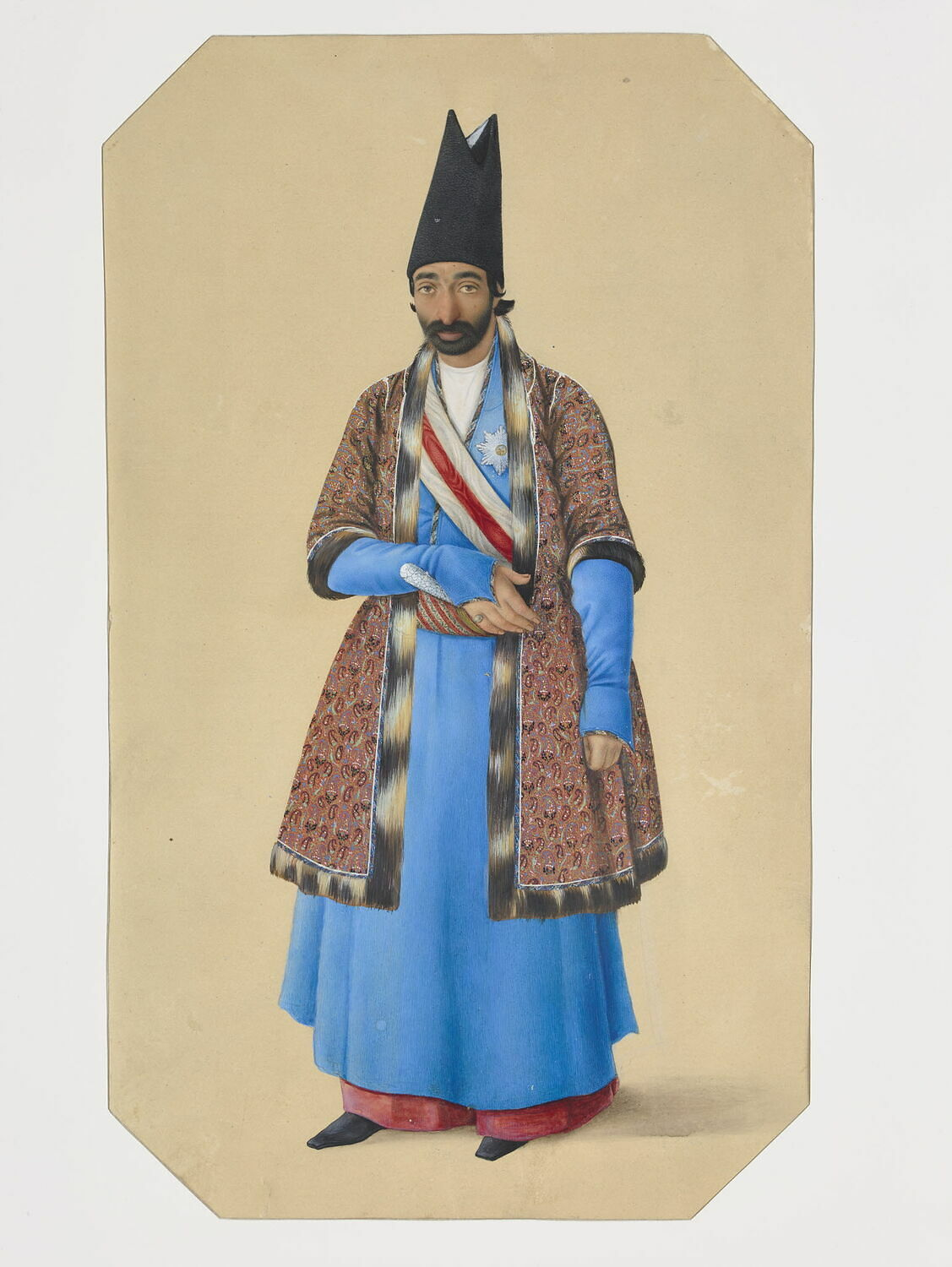
Example of Qajar Kolijeh

In the Qajar period, the same type of garment became widely known as the kolijeh, a short outer coat lined with fur and worn over long-sleeved qabās or sardāris. It was generally worn in the cold season due to its fur lining, and functioned as a ceremonial garment. Kolijehs were made from shawl fabric, bork, or various woolen fabric, namely camel, while the hem, sleeve ends, and collar were commonly decorated with fur. In Qajar society, the kolijeh was sometimes worn as an additional coat over the qabā and could be bestowed as a khil'at, particularly when made of costly Kashmir shawl and Bukhara fur, making it a garment of considerable value. Decorative embroidery frequently employed vegetal designs and botte jeghe motifs, continuing earlier ornamental traditions in a Qajar idiom In the Qajar period Women's kolijeh was sometimes known as "Shapakin" and was worn instead of an arkhāleq during winter and could come in various lengths.

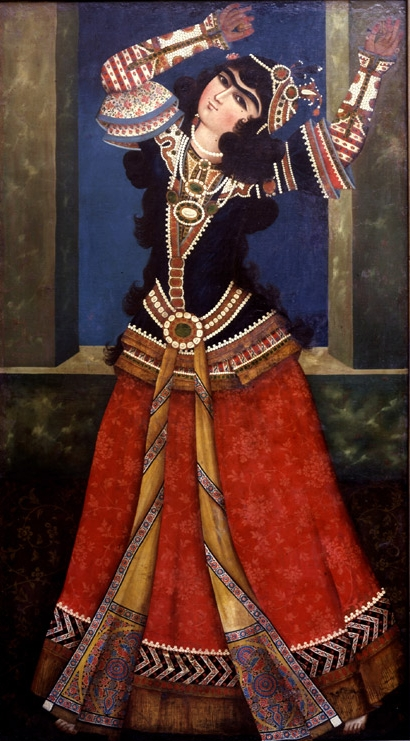
Example of sambūseh cuffs on a woman wearing two arkhāleqs on top of each other - Qajar period

The Arkhāleq (Persian: اَرخالِق) was a half length coat worn by both men and women, with long sleeves extending to the wrists and a body that covered the upper half of the torso. It was commonly lined and was made from valuable textiles including termeh, shawl cloth, boteh jeqeh fabrics, velvet, broadcloth, and worsted wool. The cuffs were a distinctive feature, often taking the form of wide triangular or pear shaped extensions known as sambūseh, which covered the backs of the hands and were woven from finer fabrics than the rest of the garment. The edges of the cuffs were embroidered and could either be turned back onto the forearm or left hanging freely from the elbow.

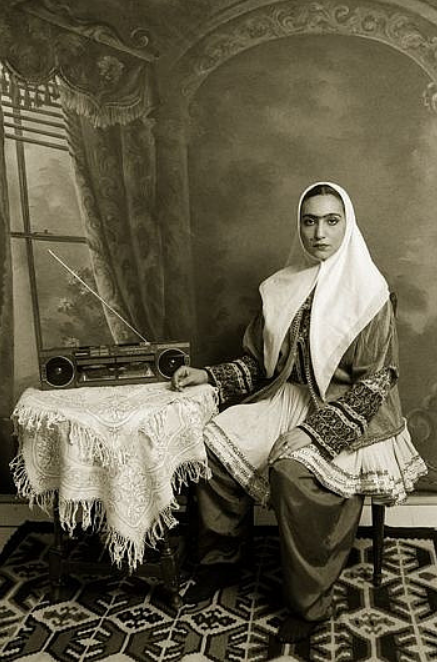
Example of Qajar-period arkhāleq worn with the signature chārqad

Variants differed in the length of their hems, skirts, and cuffs, with some examples having short elbow length cuffs and others extending over the hands. Particularly long sambūseh cuffs reaching toward the elbow were known as chīgān and were ornamented with braid and sequins. During the Safavid period, women commonly wore the arkhāleq over the pirāhan, while men wore it beneath the qabā. Women's arkhāleqs were often left unfastened despite having buttons, allowing the pirāhan and necklaces beneath to remain visible. By the eighteenth century, the arkhāleq became progressively shorter and gradually assumed a form more closely resembling a vest. In the Qajar period, the arkhāleq remained an important element of women's dress and was frequently worn with javāher-neshān ornaments, multiple pearl necklaces, and jeweled bāzūbands. Garments were commonly produced from expensive Kashmir termeh, Kerman termeh, or zarbaft fabrics woven with gold thread and further enriched with silver embroidery and braid. Owing to the durability and value of their materials, arkhāleqs could be preserved for generations, sometimes passing from grandmother to granddaughter as part of a bride's trousseau.

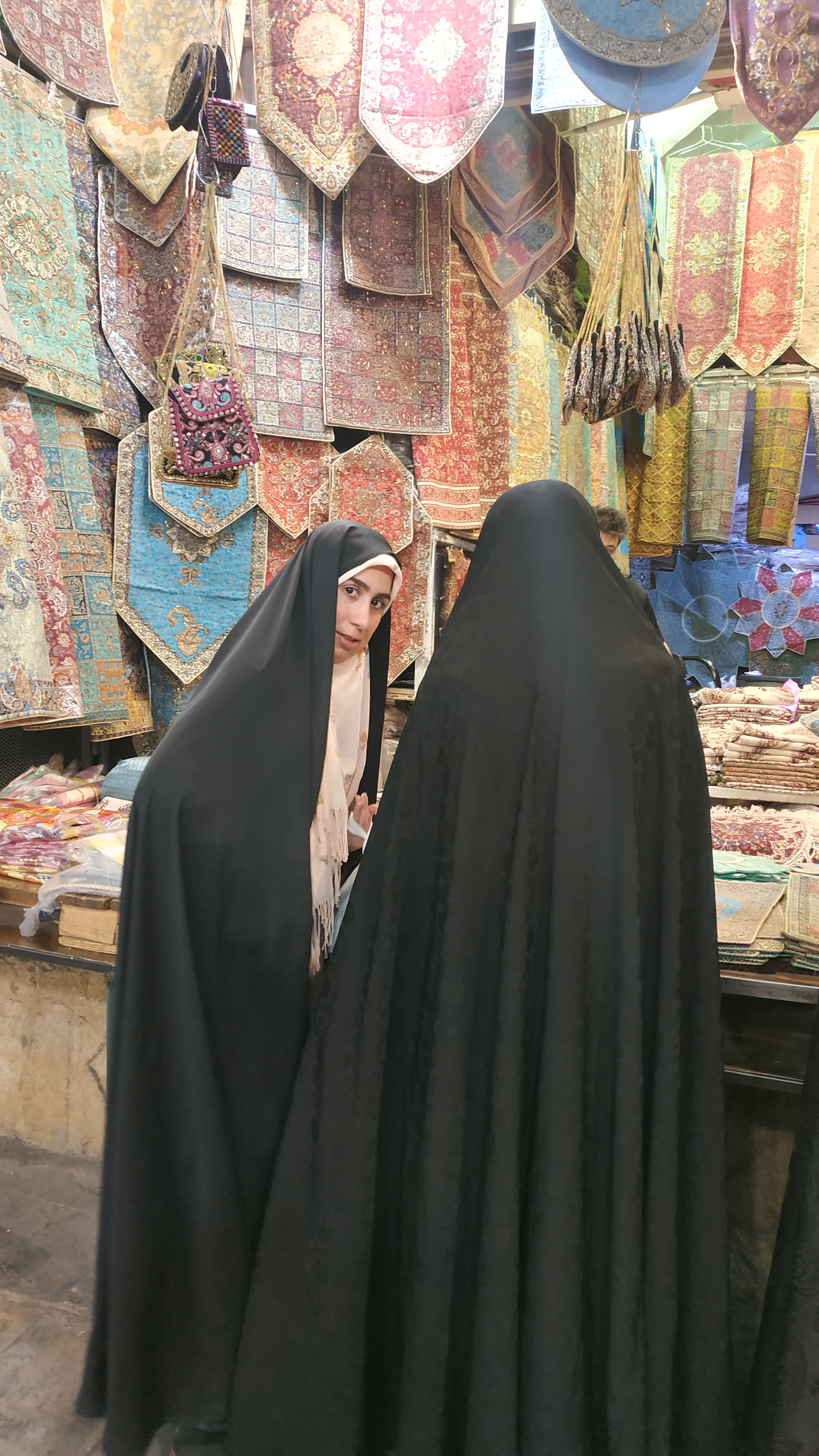
Two modern women in a shop at Shiraz Bazaar, both wearing black chādors

The Chādor (Persian: چادر) is a sleeveless outer covering worn by women over the head and body, extending from the head to the ankles and concealing the entire figure. In the Qajar period, the urban chādor was generally woven from a single piece of long, wide black cloth, although the quality of the fabric varied considerably according to the wearer's social standing. The chādor was worn over the chaqchur when outside the home. Noblewomen sometimes decorated the edges of their black chādors with golābatūn embroidery and silver trim, a practice that was later replaced by blue, brown, or white decorative bands approximately two finger-widths wide sewn around the edges.

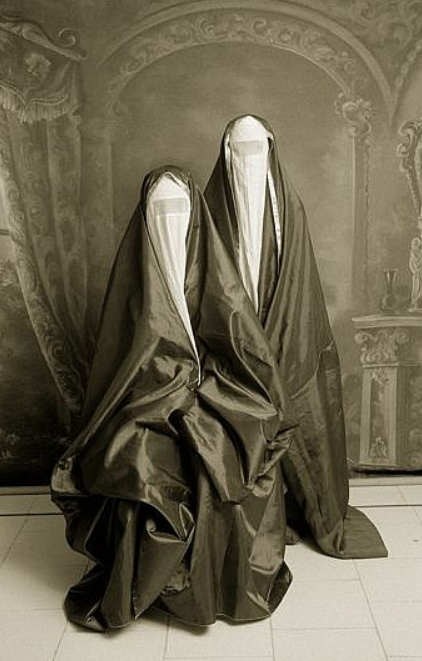
Examples of Qajar women wearing rūbandeh on their chādors

Comparison of Qajar visual sources further indicates that the ornamentation of the chādor became progressively simpler during the later Qajar period than it had been under Fath-Ali Shah. During the Qajar period, the use of flower patterned chādors became customary inside the home, where they were wrapped around the body or worn over the head. Because of their checkered patterns, these indoor coverings became known as chādor-e shab ("night chador"). The related chādor-e namāz was primarily worn indoors while praying, whereas the plain black chādor served as the standard outdoor covering. Although black outdoor chādors predominated, elite women occasionally embellished their edges with decorative embroidery, reflecting differences in status while preserving a common overall form. The chādor is worn by religious Iranian women to this day.

The Rūbandeh (Persian: روبنده) was a rectangular face covering worn by women outside the home over the chādor as part of public dress. It was a long and wide veil, usually made of white cotton, suspended from the temples and hanging vertically in front of the face, sometimes extending as far as the knees. A horizontal opening was provided for the eyes, covered by a six sided mesh panel whose openings were sewn with silk thread to permit vision while concealing the face or a long horizontal slit embroidered in the form of a net. In some cases, women wore a picheh or niqāb in place of the rūbandeh.

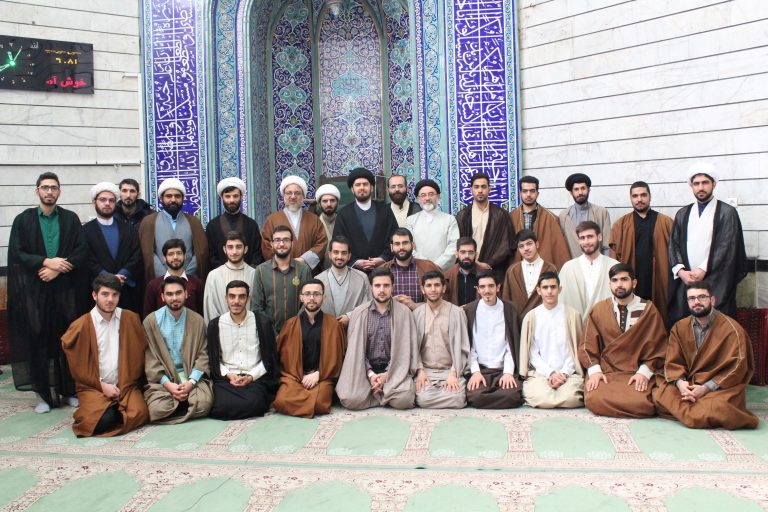
Shia clergy, dressed in brown, grey and black abās

Abā (Persian: عبا) is a long and loose radā woven of pre-fluffed wool with an open, unbuttoned front, draped over the shoulders, either sleeveless or with wide, false sleeves that do not cover the arms. In the Safavid period, it was worn in the form of a short-sleeved cloak by the Sufis and ascetics. Its material varied depending on the season and the wearer’s status; it could be made of fine, lightweight fabrics or of coarse wool and hair. Historically it was a common attire in Iranian society but today the Abā is a symbol of the Shia clergy.

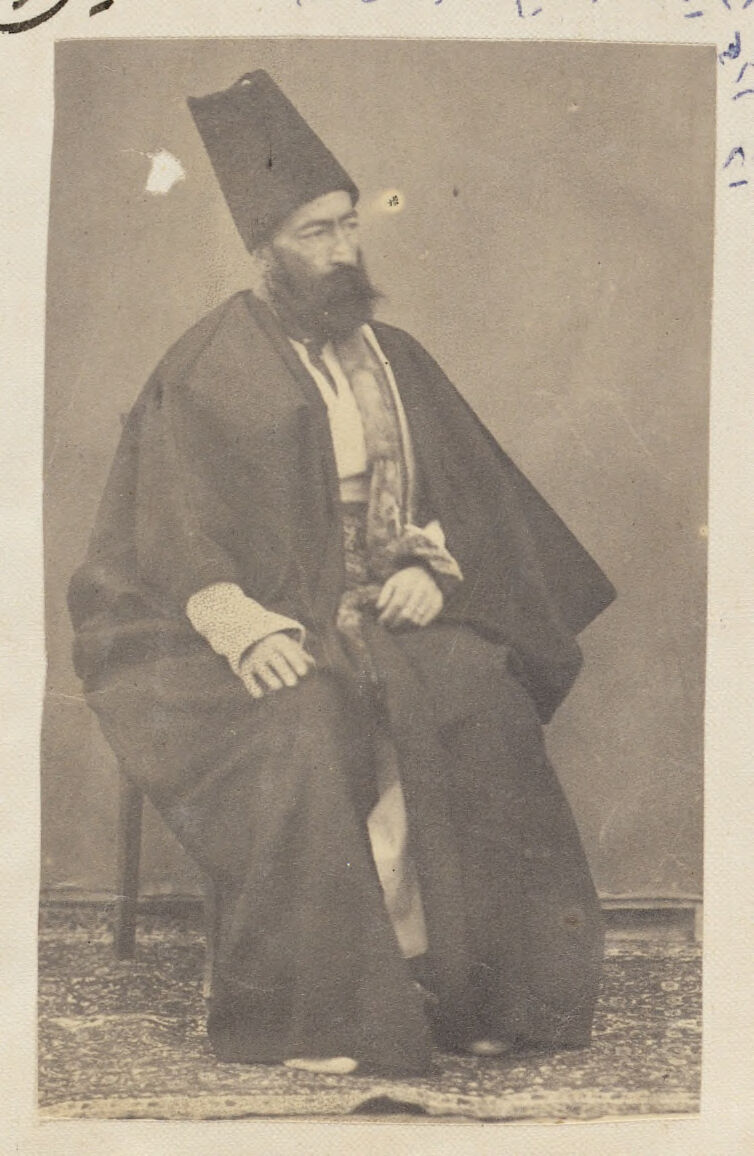
Mirza Gholamreza Isfahani "Khoshnevis" wearing an abā

Mohsen Sadrolashraf, one of the prime ministers during Reza Shah’s reign, writes in his memoirs that before the Pahlavi era, half of the people of Iran wore the abā, either regularly or occasionally (for example, for prayer). However, during the reign of Reza Shah, a law was passed that prohibited the general public from using the abā and ammāmeh, restricting their use exclusively to the clergy. According to the law enacted by the National Consultative Assembly, wearing the abā and ammāmeh was permitted only for mujtahids, prayer leaders (pishnamazan), seminary students (talabeh), and religious instructors.

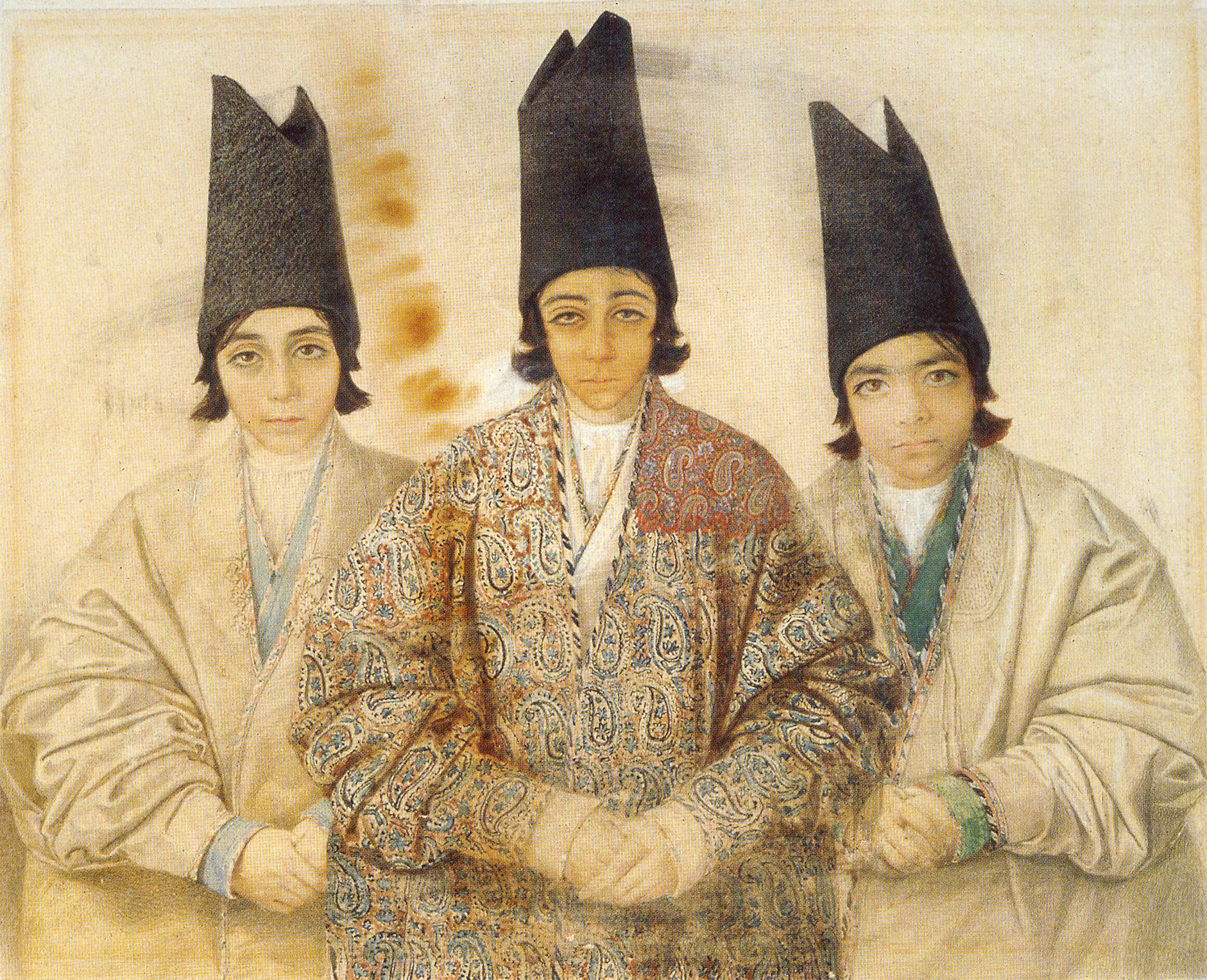
Portrait of Farrokh Khān Amin od-Dowleh's sons - All wearing the jobbeh

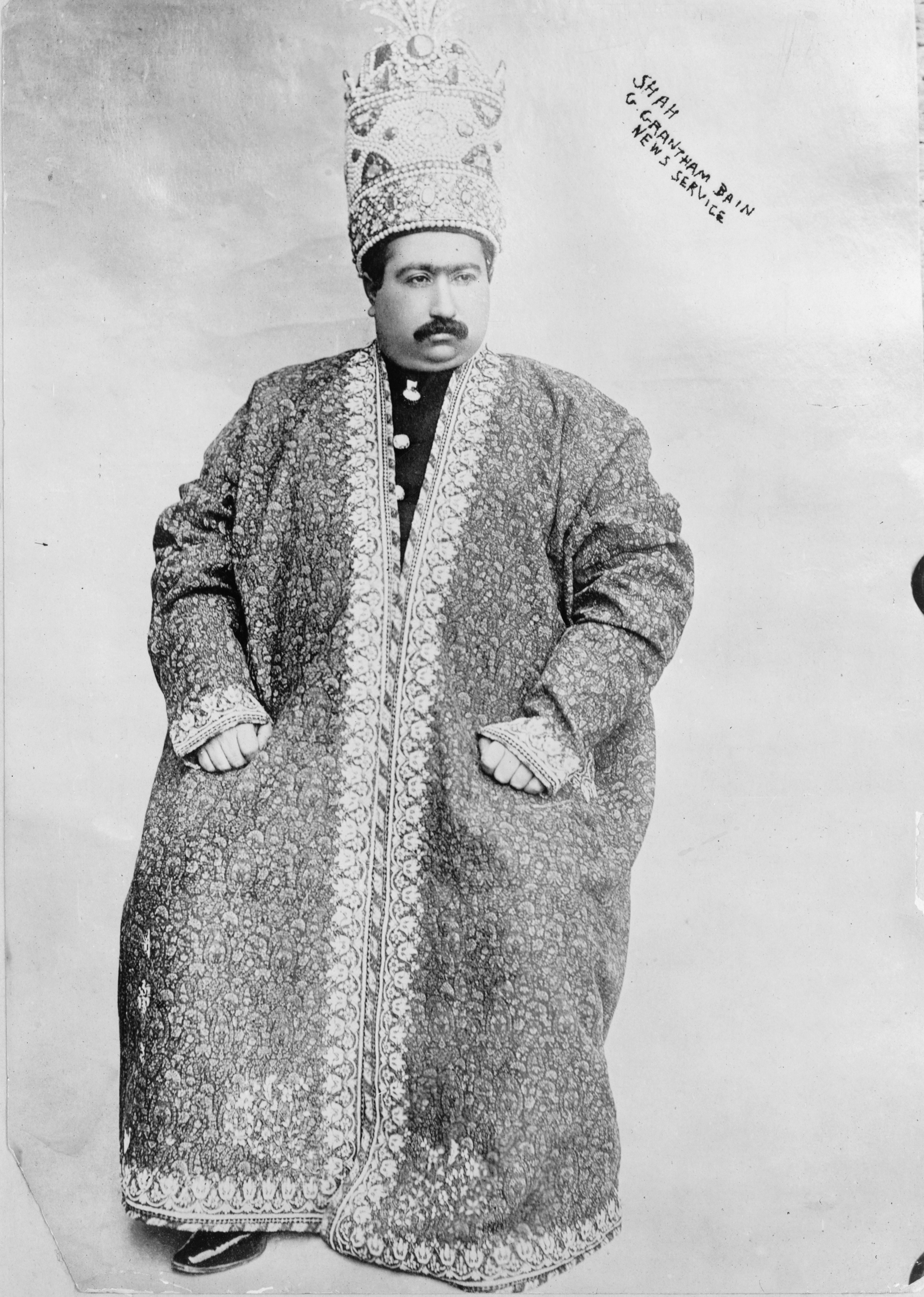
Mohammad Ali Shah wearing a jobbeh with his Kiani crown

Jobbeh (Persian: جُبه) was a very loose, baggy radā with an open front, and long, wide sleeves that tightened from the elbow down, and was considered as a luxury garment. The material usually camel wool or a mixture of thread and silk, and in the Qajar period paisley-patterned termeh was used for the jobbeh of nobility. Fur-edged cuffs and elaborate decorative bands were characteristic of the jobbeh, giving the arms a formal, luxurious finish. Its structure includes richly adorned front flaps running vertically and horizontally, embroidered with gold thread bands and metallic trims. The lower flaps of the robe are further embellished with chains and pearls

jobbeh were given to certain high ranking officials as signifiers of their rank Expensive jobbeh were used as khil'at. In the Qajar era, the jobbeh became a key outer garment for ministers, clerics, judges, and high-ranking officials, often made from luxurious imported fabrics and especially prominent during Naser al-Din Shah’s reign. In Kerman, the local wool jobbehs gained fame, with some pieces valued at thousands of pounds. Jobbehs were often passed down as heirlooms, with fine termeh varieties reserved for senior family members, and were classified into rich designs with elaborate floral patterns, mid-grade ones with simpler motifs, and plain examples for lower ranks. Observers described courtyards filled with men in magnificent jobbehs, fur-lined shawls, and tall kolāh namadis.

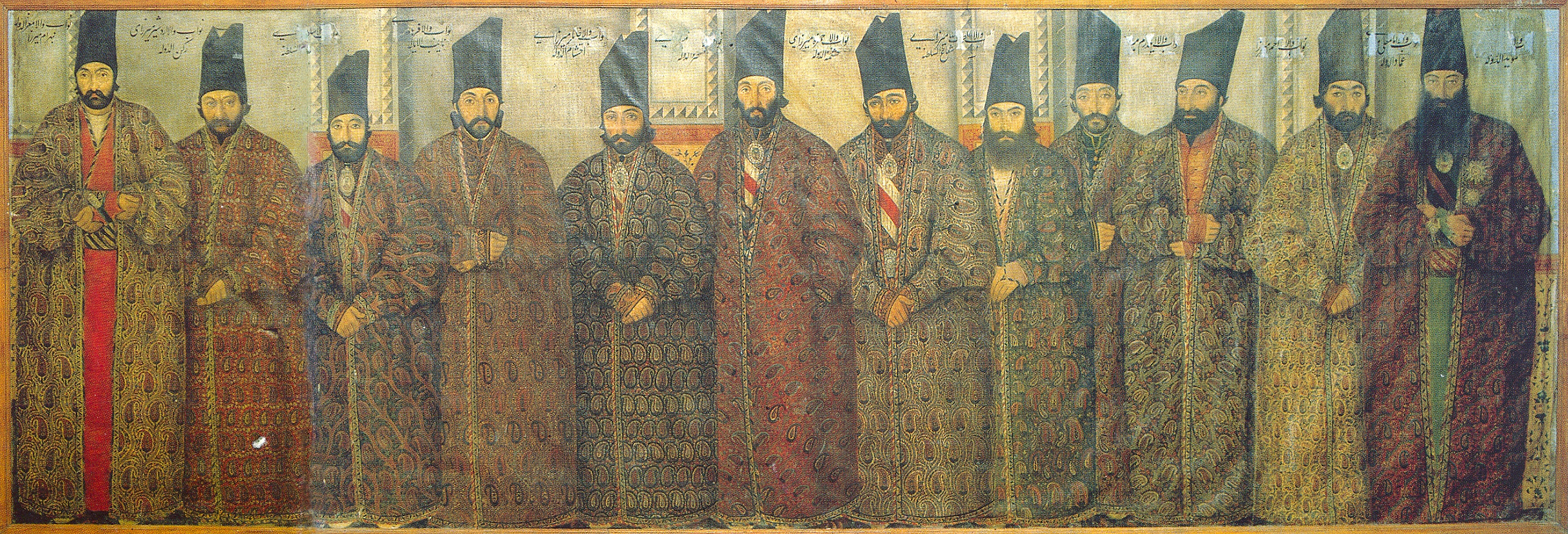
Painting by Saniolmolk, depicting Qajar dignitaries wearing elaborate jobbeh and kolāh-e Hashtarkhani

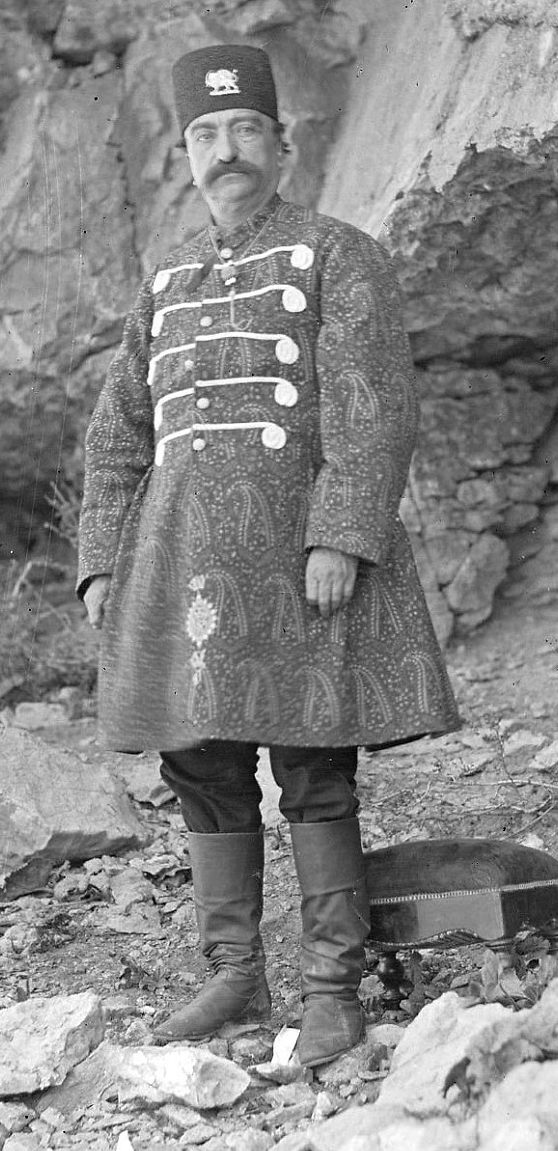
Naser al-Din Shah wearing a termeh Sardāri

Sardāri (Persian: سرداری) refers to a radā with a pleated waistband that Qajar men wore over other garments. From the mid-Qajar era (particularly during and after Naser al-Din Shah’s reign), men’s overgarment (bālāpush) included a coat-like garment that extended from the shoulders to below the knees. Over time, the outer robes of men in the late Qajar period became shorter and looser, resulting in a style where the waist area featured multiple pleats. These pleats were often made from luxurious materials such as silk, cashmere, and fine wool. Wealthy men favored Sardari garments with elaborate and colorful floral and paisley patterns, while poorer men wore simpler versions using cheaper materials like chintz and linen. The sardari became a popular bālāpush (overgarment) worn by all social classes, especially princes, military officers, and younger officials. Initially made from luxurious materials like wool, shawl fabrics, Kerman’s fine termeh, and silks. However unlike the richly patterned qabā or jobbeh, sardaris graduated towards a typically plain, factory-made style, devoid of intricate designs, embodying a modernized, understated elegance. This shift accelerated as plain, factory-made fabrics with muted tones, especially black, became prevalent among urban elites, physicians, and even Naser al-Din Shah’s own entourage. Sardaris in somber colors like dark gray or navy reflected the spread of European taste. Shahs and princes increasingly adopted these simplified sardaris for court and travel, and eventually the style trickled down to merchants and commoners. By the late Qajar era, sardaris were so common that even provincial governors, tribal leaders, and rural notables wore them in place of the once-dominant qabā and jobbeh.

=== Legwear ===
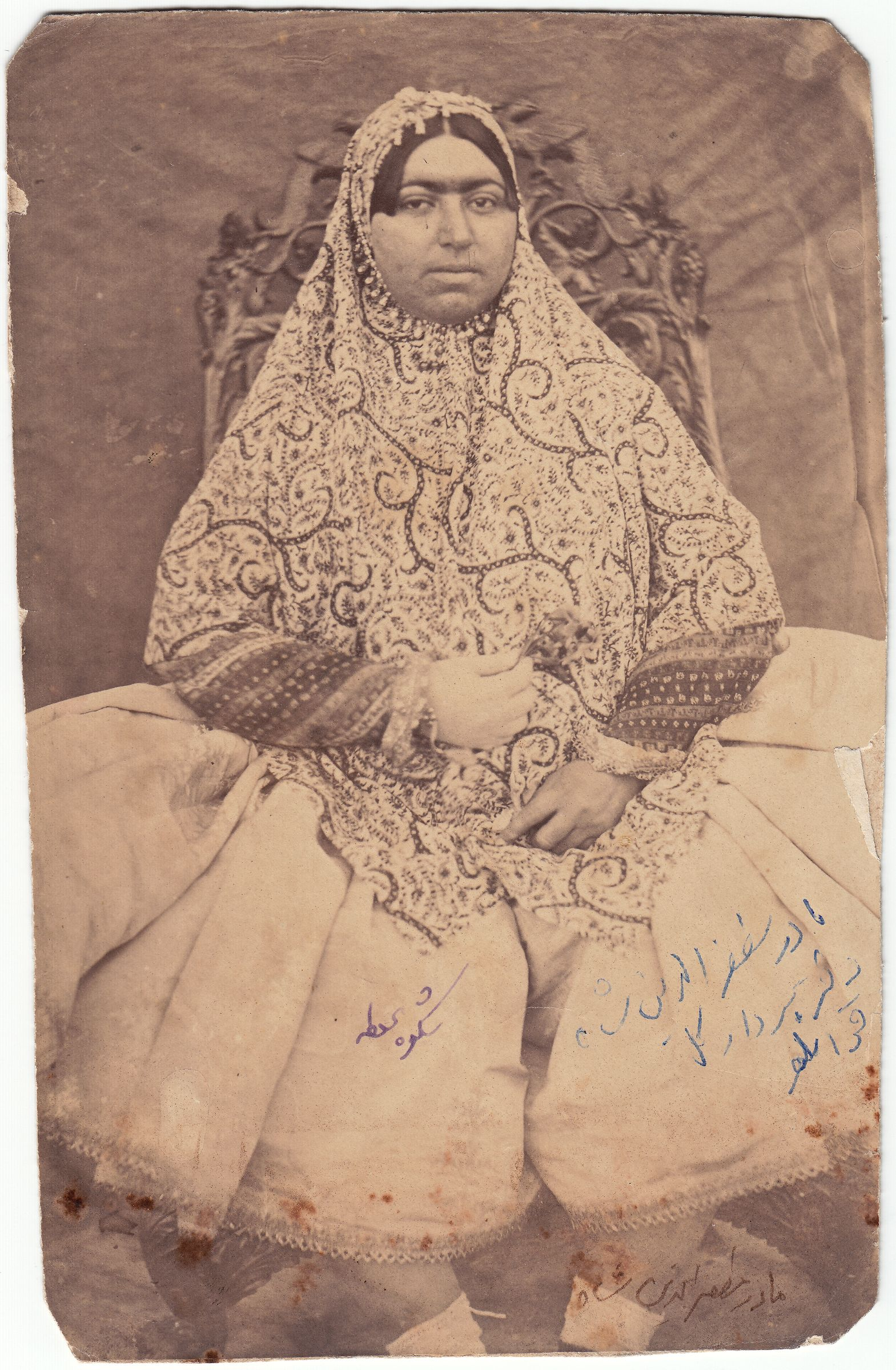
Shokouh ol-Saltaneh photographed wearing a puffy shaliteh

The Shaliteh (Persian: شَلیته) was the principal women's skirt in the Qajar period and was characterized by a wide, gathered, and fluted construction with embroidered hems. It was commonly woven from starched linen, which gave the garment sufficient stiffness to retain its fullness and pronounced folds. Women often wore two or three dāmans one over another, with the innermost skirts made from heavily starched linen so that they puffed outward, while the outer skirts were constructed in the same manner. Rather than being fitted with waistbands, dāmans were secured with cotton ties, which were often loosely fastened and could slip out of place, occasionally exposing part of the stomach. Before the reforms of Naser al-Din Shah, women's shalvār was rarely visible beneath the long skirts. Following the Shah's travels to Europe, however, the shaliteh was progressively shortened, in some cases rising above the knees, with Esmat al-Dowleh described by contemporary observers as wearing a skirt comparable in length to those of young European girls. The shortened appearance was achieved by wearing ten to fifteen shalitehs layered one above another rather than by adopting the European frilled skirt itself. According to Naser al-Din Shah's own memoirs, his visit to the Russian ballet inspired him to order similarly shortened skirts for the women of the royal harem while preserving their traditional fullness. Although these fashions were adopted at court, ordinary women and many elite households continued to wear longer skirts because of religious convictions and established custom. During the same period, another garment known as the chādor-namāz, fastened at the waist with a button or drawstring, was added to women's dress to restore modesty by concealing the body's outline after the shortening of the skirt.

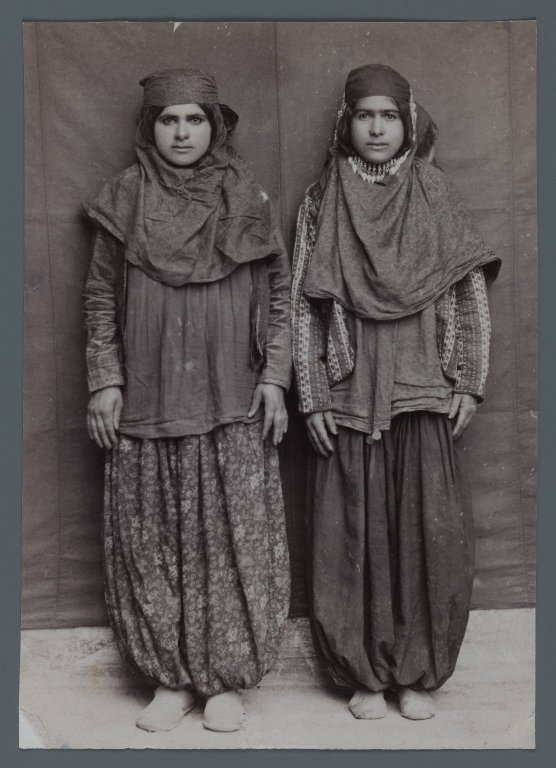
Example of women's Chāqchur

The Chāqchur (Persian: چاقچور) was a long, loose, footed outer trouser worn by women over the shaliteh and tonbān as the outermost covering of the legs. It resembled a pair of wide, gathered trousers extending from the waist to the toes, allowing the shaliteh to be placed comfortably inside when going outdoors. The garment was exceptionally wide and pleated, enabling multiple layers of clothing to fit beneath it, and was secured at the waist by a drawstring casing tied below the stomach. It was lined and fitted with narrow lower legs ending in cuffs, while stockings made of the same material were attached and extended upward to the waist. Each leg was left unsewn for approximately twenty centimeters along the inner side of the foot to facilitate movement. During the Qajar period, chāqchurs were commonly produced in purple, bright blue, crimson, or pigeon breast colors, while Sayyid women traditionally wore green examples. Black chaqchurs were regarded as the most luxurious variety. As part of women's outdoor dress, the chaqchur was worn beneath the chādor, completing the concealment of the lower body.

=== Tonoka ===
Tonoka (tonbān) was a leather pant worn for traditional wrestling and athletics, the style is tight at the waist and just below the knees, and sometimes it had decorative details. The tonoka could have details such as small mirrors sewn over the kneecaps (to display the pant wearer's confidence in their win), or embroidered loops of rough cotton cord to chafe the opponent.

=== Galesh ===
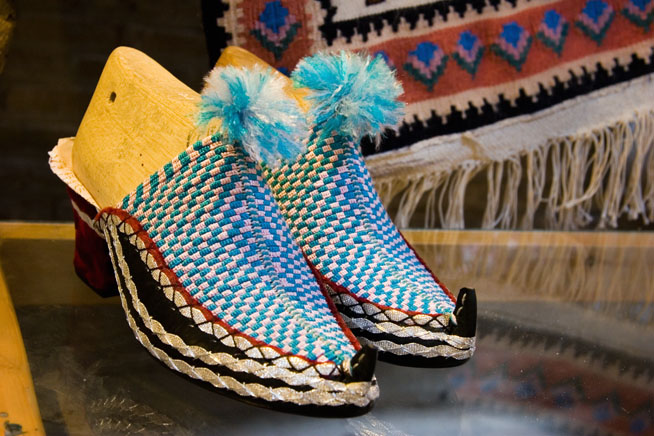
Women's galesh

Galesh (Persian: گالش) are an ancient style of handwoven shoes, that were once found in Northern Iran.

Ancient Persians used to wear shagreen horse leather high-heeled boots. These heeled boots were created for a strong grip in the stirrup while horse riding, and they were not used for walking. The Achaemenid Empire cavalry had used these boots, and they can be traced as far back as the 10th century.

== Westernization of Iranian attire ==
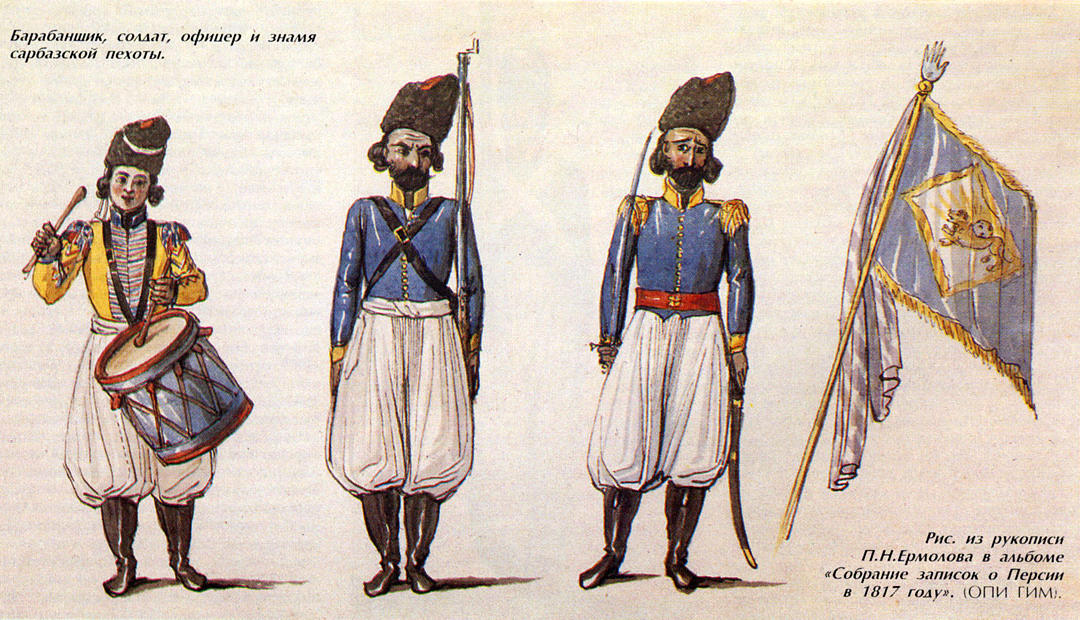
Modernised uniforms of Qajar armed forces

The first of the reforms to Iranian clothing were under orders from Abbas Mirza, crown prince to Fathali Shah. He sought to modernize the Iranian military by adopting western military advances, and influenced by European models, he introduced simplified and practical uniforms compared to traditional long garments worn by Iranians. Initially some of these changes, such as introduction of white cotton tunics and loose trousers drawing from Russian and Ottoman influences, faced resistance, with critics accusing Abbas Mirza of undermining Iranian customs and favoring European alternatives, which was seen as inappropriate for Iranian nobility.

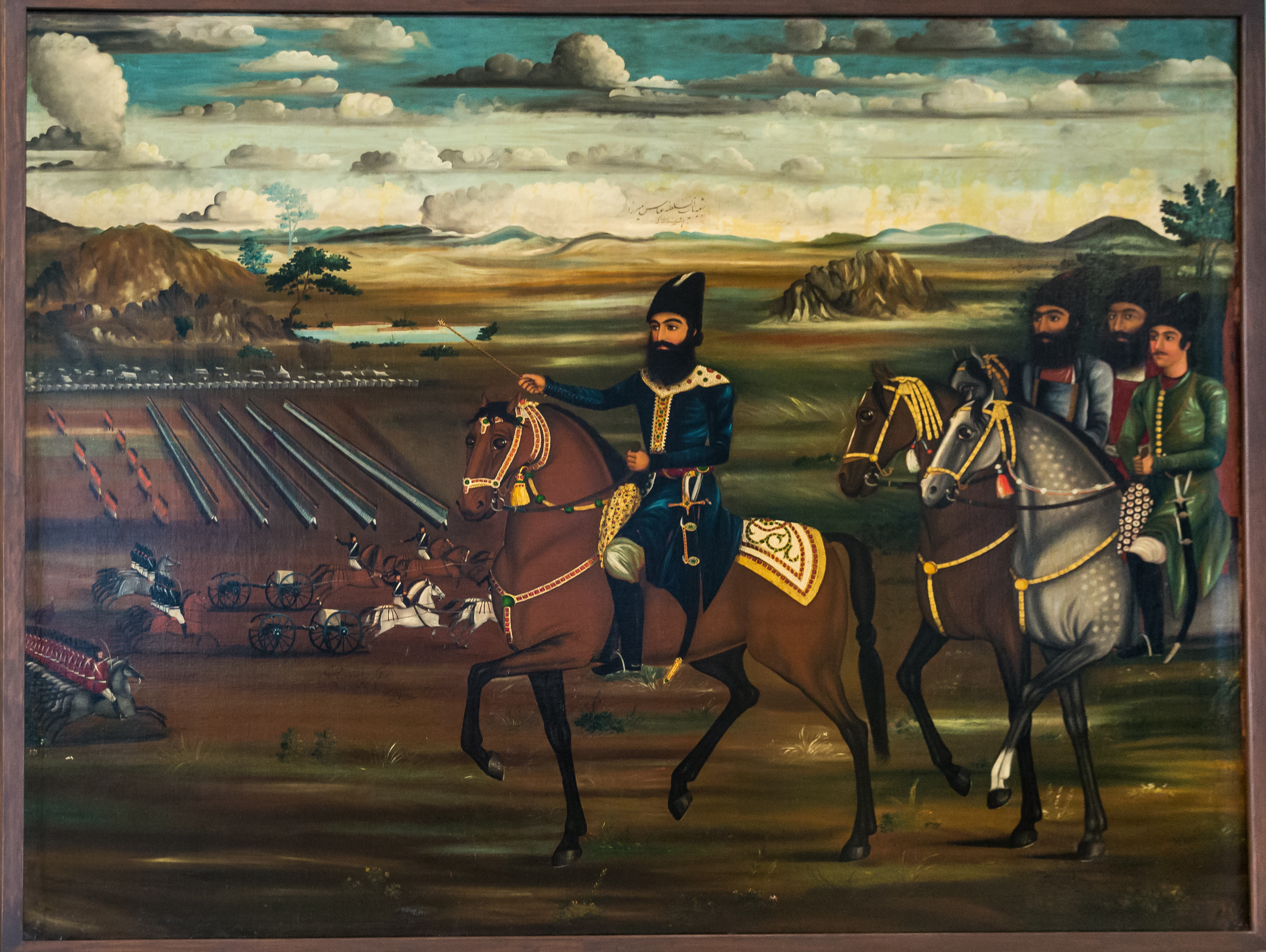
The modernised Persian army under Abbas Mirza

Overtime the Western influence in Iranian traditional clothing grew from military uniforms towards every-day attire. Early innovations began with the likes of kolah nezami (lambskin military caps) becoming common under Nasereddin Shah, with coats and trousers becoming widespread by the late Qajar period, especially the urban and military elite, while older styles persisted among rural populations.

Traditional attire particularly persisted among the Akhonds (Ulema), the Shi'a clerical class, with the qaba, aba, and ammameh carrying deep symbolic meaning, signifying piety, authority and continuity inherited from earlier Islamic traditions. Amidst the dominion of Western fashion in urban life, and despite modernizing forces pushing for uniformity of dress, the Akhonds were set apart and reinforced in their role as guardians of traditional life, overtime developing their costume into a codified clerical uniform.

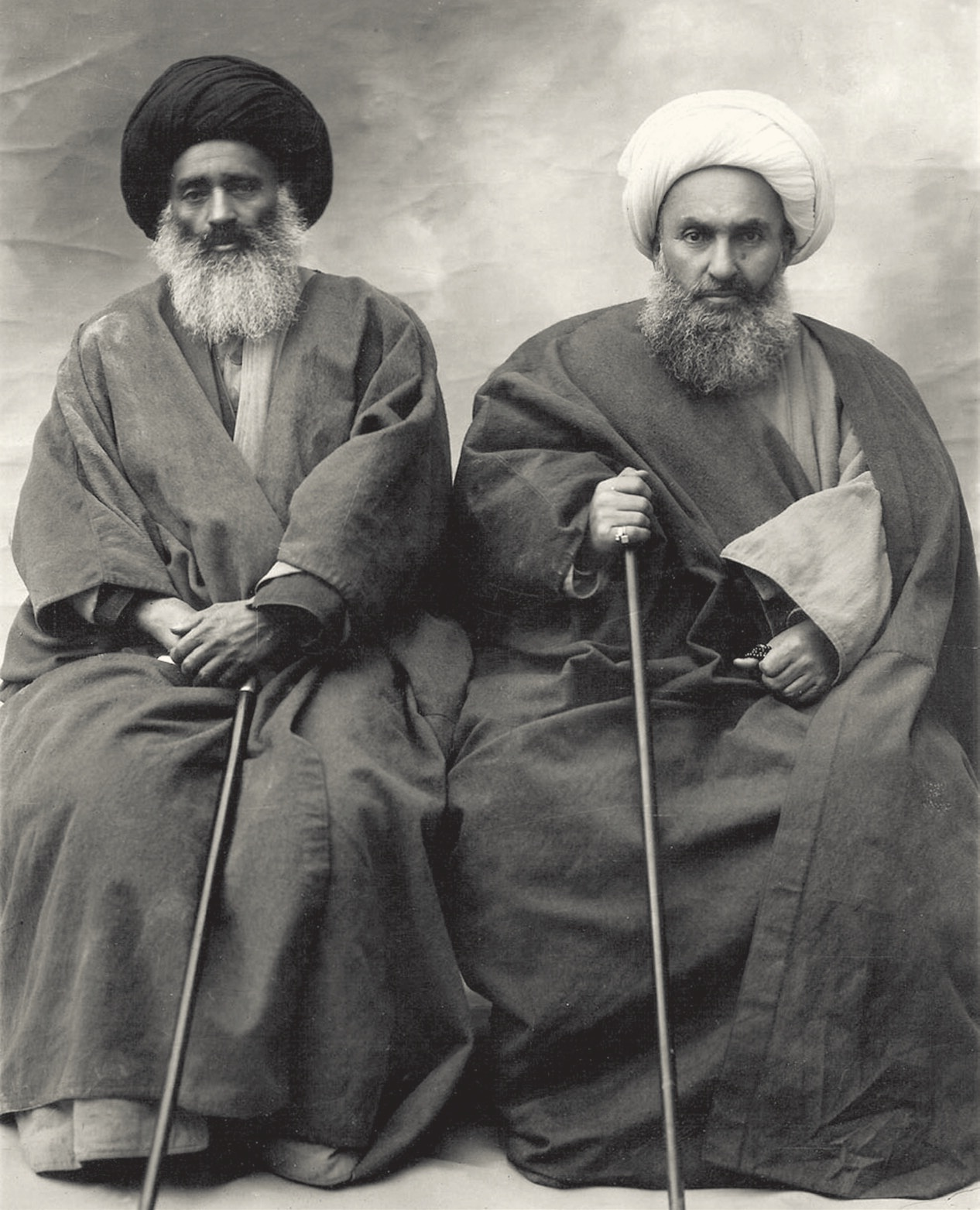

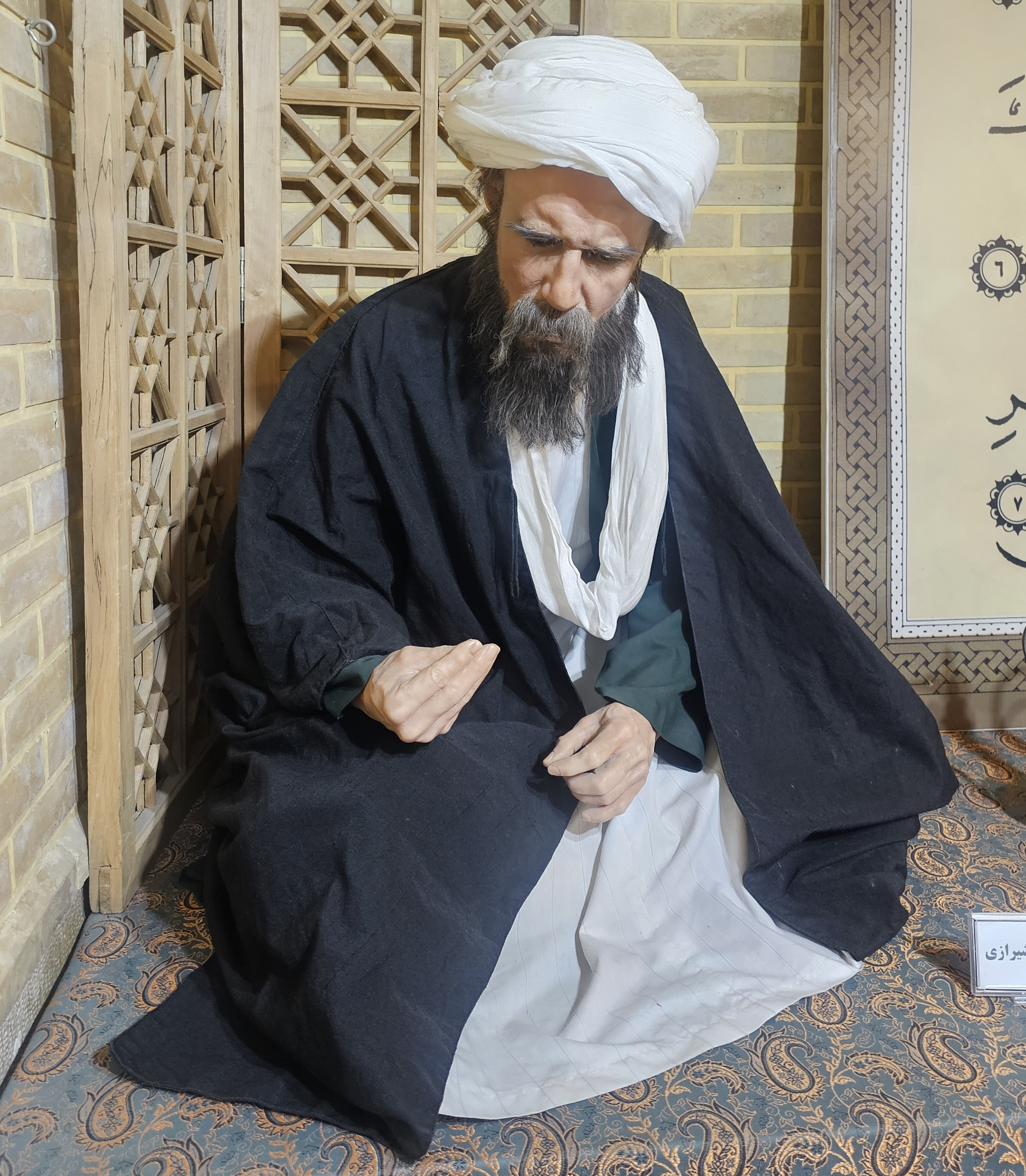

== See also ==
- Korymbos (headgear)
- Gorjiduz, leather shoe craftsman
- Zardozi
- Central Asian clothing
- Clothing in ancient Greece
- Tocharian clothing

== Sources ==
- Axworthy, Michael (2009). The Sword of Persia: Nader Shah, from Tribal Warrior to Conquering Tyrant. I.B. Tauris.
- Tucker, Ernest (2006a). "Nāder Shāh". Encyclopaedia Iranica.
