= Safavid Iran =

Iran under the Safavid dynasty from 1501 to 1736

Guarded Domains of Iran ممالک محروسه ایران (Persian) Mamâlek-e Mahruse-ye Irân
- 1501–1736
- Flag (1576–1732)

- Map of Safavid Iran and its surroundings

- Map of Safavid Iran at its greatest extent
- Status: Empire
- Capital: Tabriz (1501–1555); Qazvin (1555–1598); Isfahan (1598–1736)
- Official languages: Persian (Note: Official, coinage, civil administration, court (especially since Isfahan became capital), literary, theological discourse, diplomatic correspondence, historiography, court-based religious posts, poetry.)
- Common languages: Ajami Turkic (Note: Court, religious dignitaries, military, diplomatic correspondence, poetry.); Georgian (Note: Court.); Circassian (Note: Court.); Armenian (Note: Court.)
- Religion: Twelver Shia Islam (official) (Note: School of jurisprudence: Ja'fari); Sunni Islam; Zoroastrianism; Christianity; Judaism
- Government: Monarchy
- Shah
  - 1501–1524: Ismail I (first)
  - 1732–1736: Abbas III (eleventh & last)
- Grand vizier
  - 1501–1507: Amir Zakariya (first)
  - 1731: Rajab Ali Khan (last)
- Legislature: Council of State
- Historical era: Early modern period
  - Establishment of the Safavid order by Safi-ad-din Ardabili: 1301
  - Established: 22 December 1501
  - Hotak invasion: 1722
  - Reconquest under Nader Shah: 1726–1729
  - Disestablished: 8 March 1736
  - Nader Shah crowned: 8 March 1736

Area
- 1630: 2,900,000 km^{2} (1,100,000 sq mi)

Population
  - 1650: 8–10 million
- Currency: Tuman, Abbasi (incl. Abazi), Shahi: 1 Tuman = 50 Abbasi; 1 Tuman = 50 French livres; 1 Tuman = £3 6s 8d
Preceded by
Aq Qoyunlu
Timurid Empire
Shirvanshah
Afrasiyab dynasty
Mihrabanids
Kar-Kiya dynasty
Mar'ashis
Baduspanids
Eshaqvand dynasty
Musha'sha'
Khorshidi dynasty
Succeeded by
Afsharid Iran
Hotak Empire
Russian Empire
Ottoman Empire

The Guarded Domains of Iran, (Note: ممالک محروسه ایران, Mamâlek-e Mahruse-ye Irân) commonly called Safavid (Note: /ˈsæfəvɪd, ˈsɑː-/) Iran, Safavid Persia or the Safavid Empire, (Note: شاهنشاهی صفوی, Šāhanšāhi-ye Safavi) was one of the largest and longest-lasting Iranian empires. It was ruled by the Safavid dynasty from 1501 to 1736, though some historians date its fall to 1722, when Isfahan fell to the Afghans. It is often considered the beginning of modern Iranian history, as well as one of the gunpowder empires.

Shah Ismail I established Twelver Shi'ism as the official religion of the empire, marking one of the most important turning points in the history of Islam.

A dynasty rooted in the Safavid order, a dervish order of Sufism, founded by sheikhs of native Iranian (possibly Kurdish) origin, it was not only Persian-speaking, but also Turkic-speaking and Turkified. From their base in Ardabil, the Safavids established control over parts of Greater Iran and reasserted the Iranian identity of the region, thus becoming the first native dynasty since the Buyids to establish a national state officially known as Iran.

The main group that contributed to bringing the Safavids to power, due to making up the bulk of the Safavid army, were the Qizilbash (lit. 'red-heads'), who consisted of Turkoman tribes. Meanwhile, ethnic Iranians, including the Shahs, held the positions in bureaucracy and cultural affairs, leading the empire politically as the administrative and religious elite. In the 17th century, Armenian, Georgian, and Circassian gholams (slave-soldiers) emerged as the "Third Force" and became the primary military authority until the fall of the Safavids.

The Safavids ruled from 1501 to 1722 (experiencing a brief restoration from 1729 to 1736 and 1750 to 1773) and, at their height, they controlled all of what is now Iran, Azerbaijan, Armenia, eastern Georgia, parts of the North Caucasus including Russia, and Iraq, as well as parts of Turkey, Syria, Pakistan, Afghanistan, Turkmenistan, and Uzbekistan.

Despite their demise in 1736, the legacy that they left behind was the revival of Iran as an economic stronghold between East and West, the establishment of an efficient state and bureaucracy based upon "checks and balances", their architectural innovations, and patronage for fine arts. The Safavids have also left their mark down to the present era by establishing Twelver Shi'ism as the state religion of Iran, as well as spreading Shia Islam in major parts of Central Asia, Caucasus, Anatolia, the Persian Gulf, and Mesopotamia.

The Safavid dynasty is considered a turning point in the history of Iran after the Muslim conquest of Persia, as after centuries of rule by non-Iranian kings, the country became an independent power in the Islamic world.

== Names ==
The Guarded Domains of Iran was the common and official name of the Safavid realm, and it remained the country's official title under subsequent rulers until 1924. The idea of the Guarded Domains illustrated a feeling of territorial and political uniformity in a society where the Persian language, culture, monarchy, and Shia Islam became integral elements of the developing national identity. The concept presumably had started to form under the Ilkhanate in the late 13th century, contributing to the establishment of the early modern Persianate society. Its shortened form was mamalik-i Iran ("Kingdom of Iran"), and it also had other variants, such as mamalik-i mahrusa-yi khusravani ("the Royal Guarded Domains") and mamalik-i mahrusa-yi humayun ("the Imperial Guarded Domains").; It was also often shortend as Iran.

The phrase mulk-i vasi' al-faza-yi Iran ("the expansive realm of Iran") is used in both the 17th-century chronicle Khold-e barin and the 1680s travelogue Safine-ye Solaymani by the Safavid ambassador to the Ayutthaya Kingdom. This recurring expression highlights the authors' pride and recognition of their homeland. This expression is likely the appropriate Persian way to describe an "empire" in the writings of that period.

== Background ==
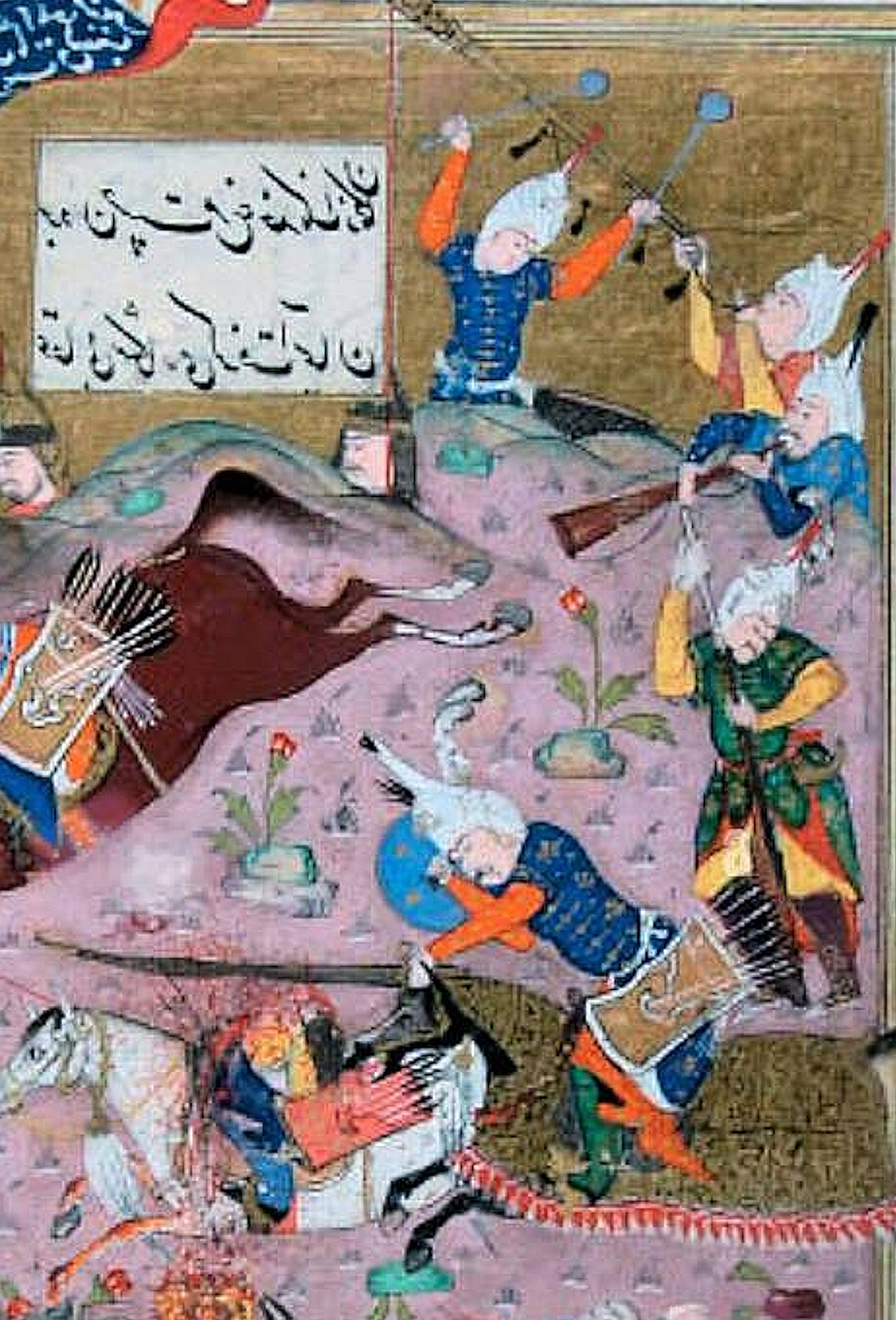
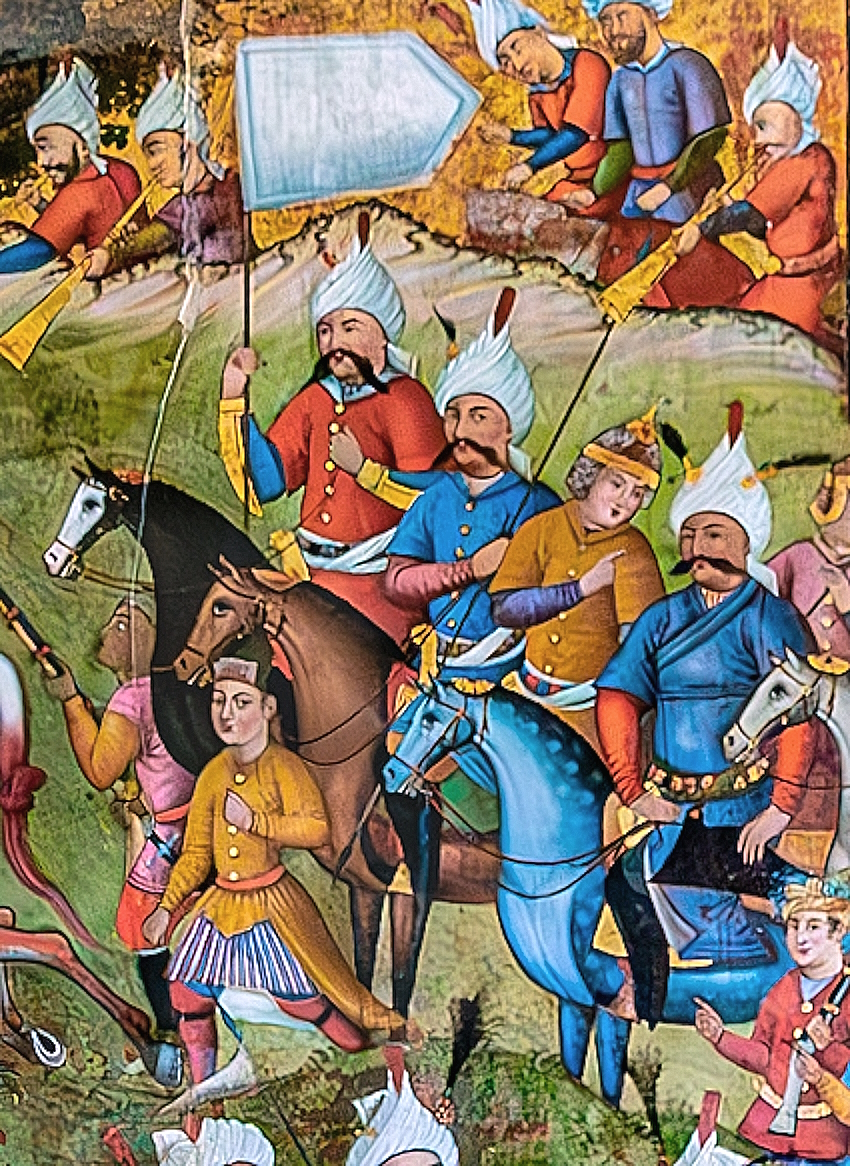
Contemporary depictions of Qizilbash troops:
Left: troops supporting a charge of Shah Ismail I (bottom). Shāhnāmah Shāh Ismaʿīl, 1541, Tabriz
Right: Qizilbash troops of Shah Ismail I painted circa 1647, Chehel Sotoun

Safavid history begins with the establishment of the Zahediyeh Sufi order in Gilan by its eponymous founder Zahed Gilani. Having no male heir, Zahed married his daughter to his favorite disciple, Safi al-Din Ardabili, and appointed him as the spiritual successor of the Zahediyeh order. Safi al-Din succeeded him upon his death in 1301, and through his great spiritual charisma, the Zahediyeh order gained enormous influence in the city of Ardabil—Hamdullah Mustaufi noted that most of the people of Ardabil were followers of Safi al-Din. Consequently, the Zahediyeh gradually became known as the Safaviyya, after the more widely known Safi al-Din.

Religious poetry from Safi al-Din, written in the Old Azari language—a now-extinct Northwestern Iranian language—and accompanied by a paraphrase in Persian that helps its understanding, has survived to this day and has linguistic importance.

After Safī al-Dīn, the leadership of the Safaviyya passed to Sadr al-Dīn Mūsā († 794/1391–92). The order at this time was transformed into a religious movement that conducted religious propaganda throughout Iran, Syria and Asia Minor, and most likely had maintained its Sunni Shafi'ite origin at that time. The leadership of the order passed from Sadr ud-Dīn Mūsā to his son Khvajeh Ali Safavi († 1429) and in turn to his son Ibrāhīm († 1429–1447).

When Shaykh Junayd, the son of Ibrāhim, assumed the leadership of the Safaviyya in 1447, the history of the Safavid movement was radically changed. According to historian Roger Savory, "Sheikh Junayd was not content with spiritual authority and he sought material power." At that time, the most powerful dynasty in Iran was that of the Qara Qoyunlu, the "Black Sheep", whose ruler Jahan Shah ordered Junāyd to leave Ardabil or else he would bring destruction and ruin upon the city. Junayd sought refuge with the rival of Kara Koyunlu Jahan Shah, the Aq Qoyunlu (White Sheep Turkomans) Khan Uzun Hassan, and cemented his relationship by marrying Uzun Hassan's sister, Khadija Begum. Junayd was killed during an incursion into the territories of the Shirvanshah and was succeeded by his son Haydar Safavi.

Haydar married Alamshah Halime Begum, Uzun Hassan's daughter, possibly named "Martha", who gave birth to Ismail I, founder of the Safavid dynasty. Martha's mother Theodora—better known as Despina Khatun—was a Pontic Greek princess, the daughter of the Grand Komnenos John IV of Trebizond. She had been married to Uzun Hassan in exchange for protection of the Grand Komnenos from the Ottomans.

After Uzun Hassan's death, his son Ya'qub felt threatened by the growing Safavid religious influence. Ya'qub allied himself with the Shirvanshah and killed Haydar in 1488. By this time, the bulk of the Safaviyya were nomadic Oghuz Turkic-speaking clans from Asia Minor and Azerbaijan and were known as Qizilbash "Red Heads" because of their distinct red headgear. The Qizilbash were warriors, spiritual followers of Haydar, and a source of the Safavid military and political power.

After the death of Haydar, the Safaviyya gathered around his son Ali Mirza Safavi, who was also pursued and subsequently killed by Ya'qub. According to official Safavid history, before dying, Ali had designated his young brother Ismail as the spiritual leader of the Safaviyya.

== Society ==
While large in terms of land area, the large proportion of deserts and mountains in its territory meant density was very low; the empire's population is estimated to have probably numbered between eight and ten million in 1650, as compared to c. 20 million for the Ottoman Empire in 1600.

Safavid society was a meritocracy where officials were appointed on the basis of worth and merit, and not on the basis of birth. It was certainly not an oligarchy, nor was it an aristocracy. Sons of nobles were considered for the succession of their fathers as a mark of respect, but they had to prove themselves worthy of the position. This system avoided an entrenched aristocracy or a caste society. There are numerous recorded accounts of laymen that rose to high official posts as a result of their merits.

Nevertheless, the Iranian society during the Safavids was that of a hierarchy, with the shah at the apex of the hierarchical pyramid, the common people, merchants and peasants at the base, and the aristocrats in between. The term dowlat, which in modern Persian means "government", was then an abstract term meaning "bliss" or "felicity", and it began to be used as concrete sense of the Safavid state, reflecting the view that the people had of their ruler, as someone elevated above humanity.

Also among the aristocracy, in the middle of the hierarchical pyramid, were the religious officials, who, mindful of the historic role of the religious classes as a buffer between the ruler and his subjects, usually did their best to shield the ordinary people from oppressive governments.

=== Turks and Tajiks ===
The power structure of the Safavid state was mainly divided into two groups: the Turkic-speaking military – whose job was to maintain the territorial integrity and continuity of the Iranian empire through their leadership – and the Persian-speaking administrative/governing elite – whose job was to oversee the operation and development of the nation and its identity through their high positions. Thus came the term "Turk and Tajik" to describe the Persianate, or Turko-Persian, nature of many dynasties which ruled over Greater Iran between the 12th and 20th centuries, in that these dynasties promoted and helped continue the dominant Persian linguistic and cultural identity of their states, although many of the dynasties themselves were of non-Persian (e.g. Turkic) origins. The relationship between the Turkic-speaking 'Turks' and Persian-speaking 'Tajiks' was symbiotic, yet some form of rivalry did exist between the two. As the former represented the "people of the sword" and the latter, "the people of the pen", high-level official posts would naturally be reserved for the Persians. Indeed, this had been the situation throughout Persian history, even before the Safavids, ever since the Arab conquest. Shah Tahmasp introduced a change to this, when he, and the other Safavid rulers who succeeded him, sought to blur the formerly defined lines between the two linguistic groups, by taking the sons of Turkic-speaking officers into the royal household for their education in the Persian language. Consequently, they were slowly able to take on administrative jobs in areas which had hitherto been the exclusive preserve of the ethnic Persians.

=== The third force: Caucasians ===
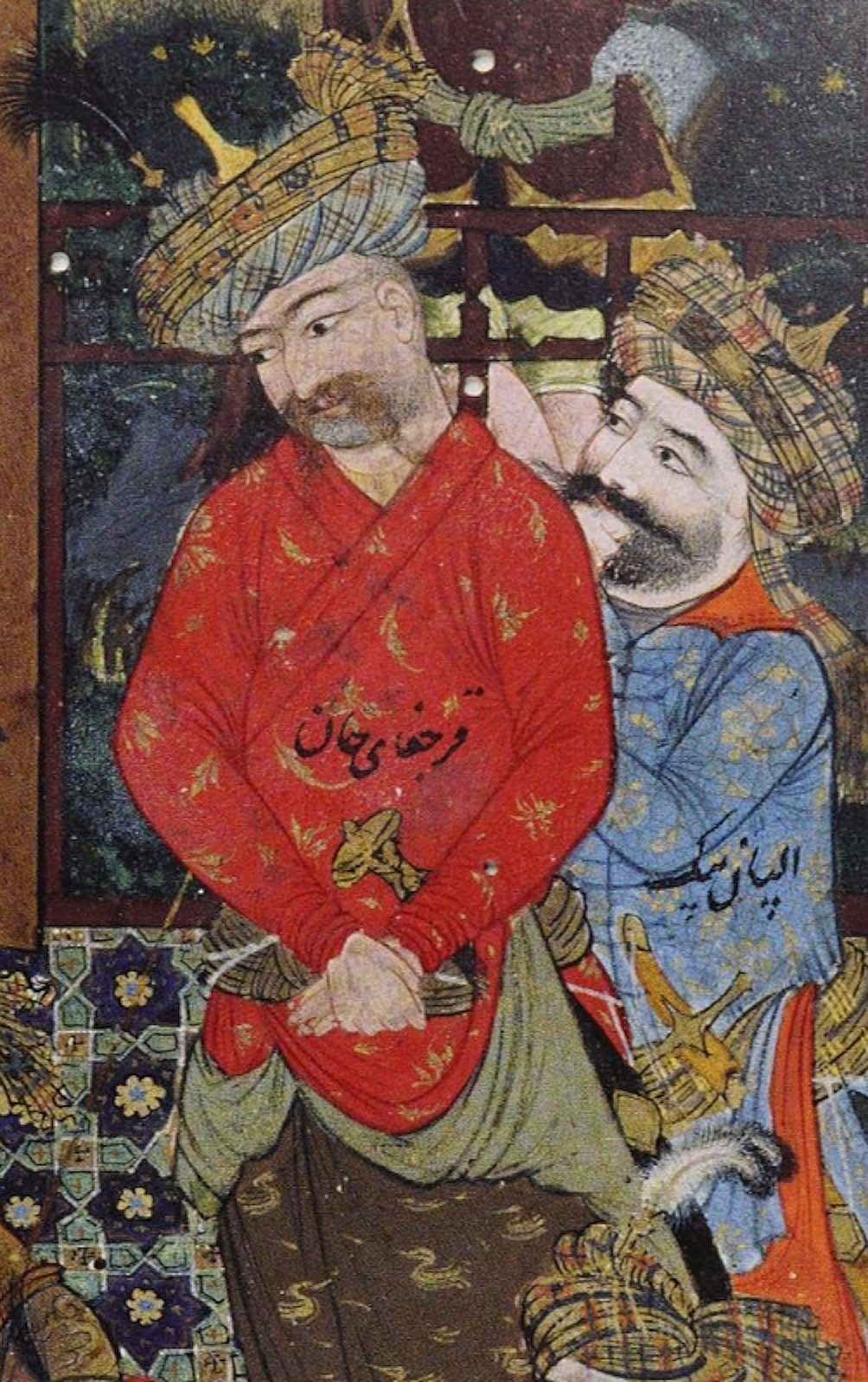
Qarachaqay Khan (in red), an Armenian general in the service of Shah Abbas I. 1620-25, Isfahan.

From 1540 and onwards, Shah Tahmasp initiated a gradual transformation of the Iranian society by slowly constructing a new branch and layer solely composed of ethnic Caucasians. The implementation of this branch would be significantly widened and completed under Abbas the Great (Abbas I). According to Colin Mitchell, for Tahmasp, the background of this transformation circled around the aim of drastically restricting the power of the military tribal elite of the empire, the Qezelbāš. This was a huge impedance for the authority of the shah, and furthermore, it undermined any developments without the agreeing or shared profit of the Qezelbāš. As Tahmasp understood and realized that any long-term solutions would mainly involve minimizing the political and military presence of the Qizilbash as a whole, it would require them to be replaced by a whole new layer in society, that would question and battle the authority of the Qizilbash on every possible level, and minimize any of their influences. This layer would be solely composed of hundreds of thousands of deported, imported, and to a lesser extent voluntarily migrated ethnic Circassians, Georgians, and Armenians. This layer would become the "third force" in Iranian society, alongside the other two forces, the Turkomans and Persians.

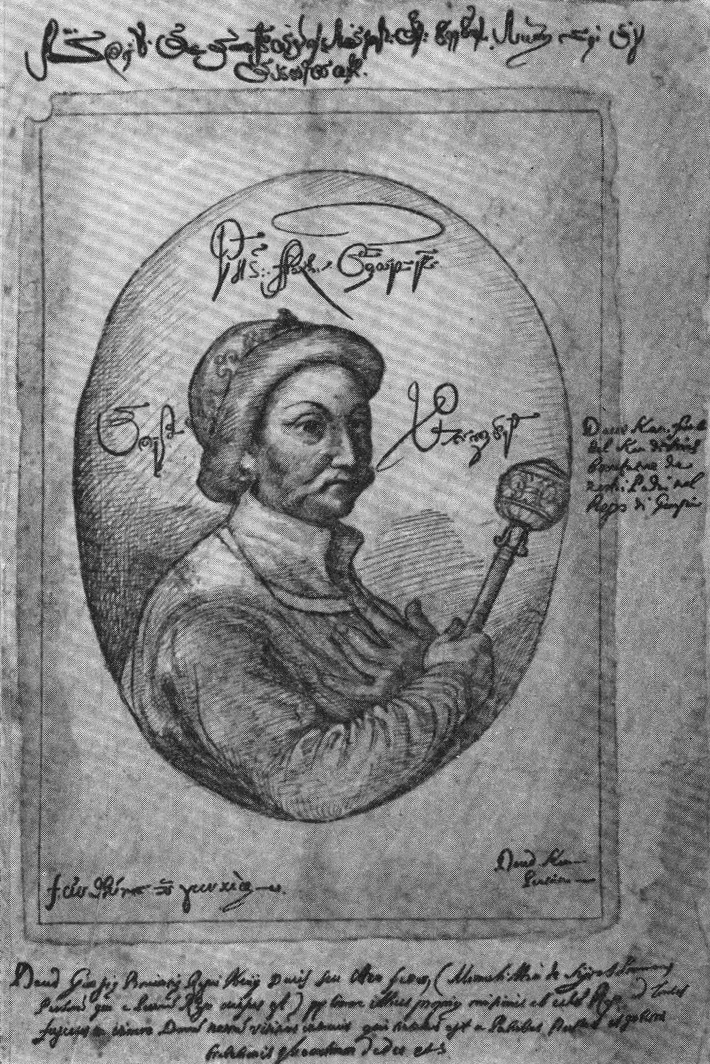
Daud Khan Undiladze, military commander, ghilman and the governor of Ganja and Karabakh from 1625 to 1630.

The series of campaigns that Tahmasp subsequently waged after realising this in the wider Caucasus between 1540 and 1554 were meant to uphold the morale and the fighting efficiency of the Qezelbāš military, but they brought home large numbers (over 70,000) of Christian Georgian, Circassian and Armenian slaves as its main objective, and would be the basis of this third force; the new (Caucasian) layer in society. According to the Encyclopædia Iranica, this would be as well the starting point for the corps of the ḡolāmān-e ḵāṣṣa-ye-e šarifa, or royal slaves, who would dominate the Safavid military for most of the empire's length, and would form a crucial part of the third force. As non-Turcoman converts to Islam, these Circassian and Georgian ḡolāmāns (also written as ghulams) were completely unrestrained by clan loyalties and kinship obligations, which was an attractive feature for a ruler like Tahmāsp whose childhood and upbringing had been deeply affected by Qizilbash tribal politics. Their formation, implementation, and usage was very much alike to the janissaries of the neighbouring Ottoman Empire. In turn, many of these transplanted women became wives and concubines of Tahmasp, and the Safavid harem emerged as a competitive, and sometimes lethal, arena of ethnic politics as cliques of Turkmen, Circassian, and Georgian women and courtiers vied with each other for the king's attention. Although the first slave soldiers would not be organized until the reign of Abbas I, during Tahmasp's reign, Caucasians already became important members of the royal household, Harem and in the civil and military administration, and were on their way of becoming an integral part of society. Tahmasp I's successor, Ismail II, brought another 30,000 Circassians and Georgians to Iran of which many joined the ghulam force.

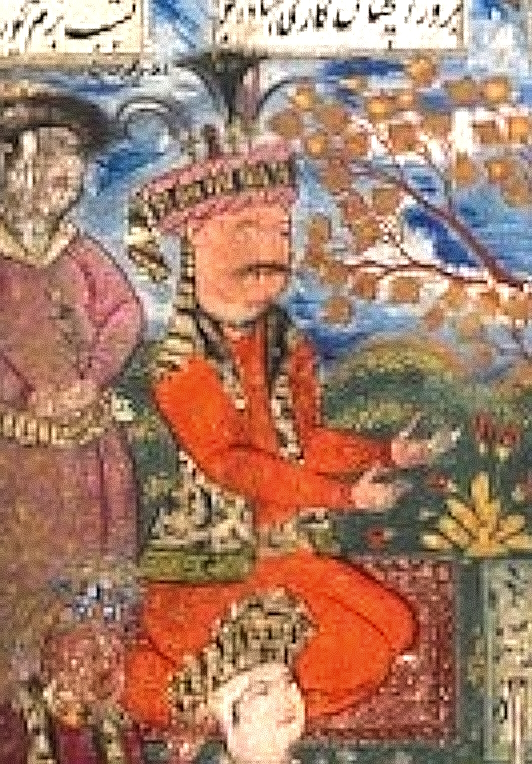
Imām Qulī Khān, son of Allahverdi Khan, Safavid dignitaries of Georgian origin. Jarūnnāmah by Qadrī, Isfahan (1697)

Following the full implementation of this policy by Abbas I, the women (only Circassian and Georgian) now very often came to occupy prominent positions in the harems of the Safavid elite, while the men who became part of the ghulam "class" as part of the powerful third force were given special training on completion of which they were either enrolled in one of the newly created ghilman regiments, or employed in the royal household. The rest of the masses of deportees and importees, a significant portion numbering many hundreds of thousands, were settled in various regions of mainland Iran, and were given all kinds of roles as part of society, such as craftsmen, farmers, cattle breeders, traders, soldiers, generals, governors, woodcutters, etc., all also part of the newly established layer in Iranian society.

Shah Abbas, who significantly enlarged and completed this program and under whom the creation of this new layer in society may be mentioned as fully "finalized", completed the ghulam system as well. As part of its completion, he greatly expanded the ghulam military corps from just a few hundred during Tahmasp's era, to 15,000 highly trained cavalrymen, as part of a whole army division of 40,000 Caucasian ghulams. He then went on to completely reduce the number of Qizilbash provincial governorships and systematically moved qizilbash governors to other districts, thus disrupting their ties with the local community, and reducing their power. Most were replaced by a ghulam, and within short time, Georgians, Circassians, and to a lesser extent Armenians had been appointed to many of the highest offices of state, and were employed within all other possible sections of society. By 1595, Allahverdi Khan, a Georgian, became one of the most powerful men in the Safavid state, when he was appointed the Governor-General of Fars, one of the richest provinces in Iran. And his power reached its peak in 1598, when he became the commander-in-chief of the armed forces. Thus, starting from the reign of Tahmasp I but only fully implemented and completed by Shah Abbas, this new group solely composed of ethnic Caucasians eventually came to constitute a powerful "third force" within the state as a new layer in society, alongside the Persians and the Qizilbash Turks, and it only goes to prove the meritocratic society of the Safavids.

It is estimated that during Abbas' reign alone some 130,000–200,000 Georgians, tens of thousands of Circassians, and around 300,000 Armenians had been deported and imported from the Caucasus to mainland Iran, all obtaining functions and roles as part of the newly created layer in society, such as within the highest positions of the state, or as farmers, soldiers, craftspeople, as part of the Royal harem, the Court, and peasantry, amongst others.

=== Religion ===
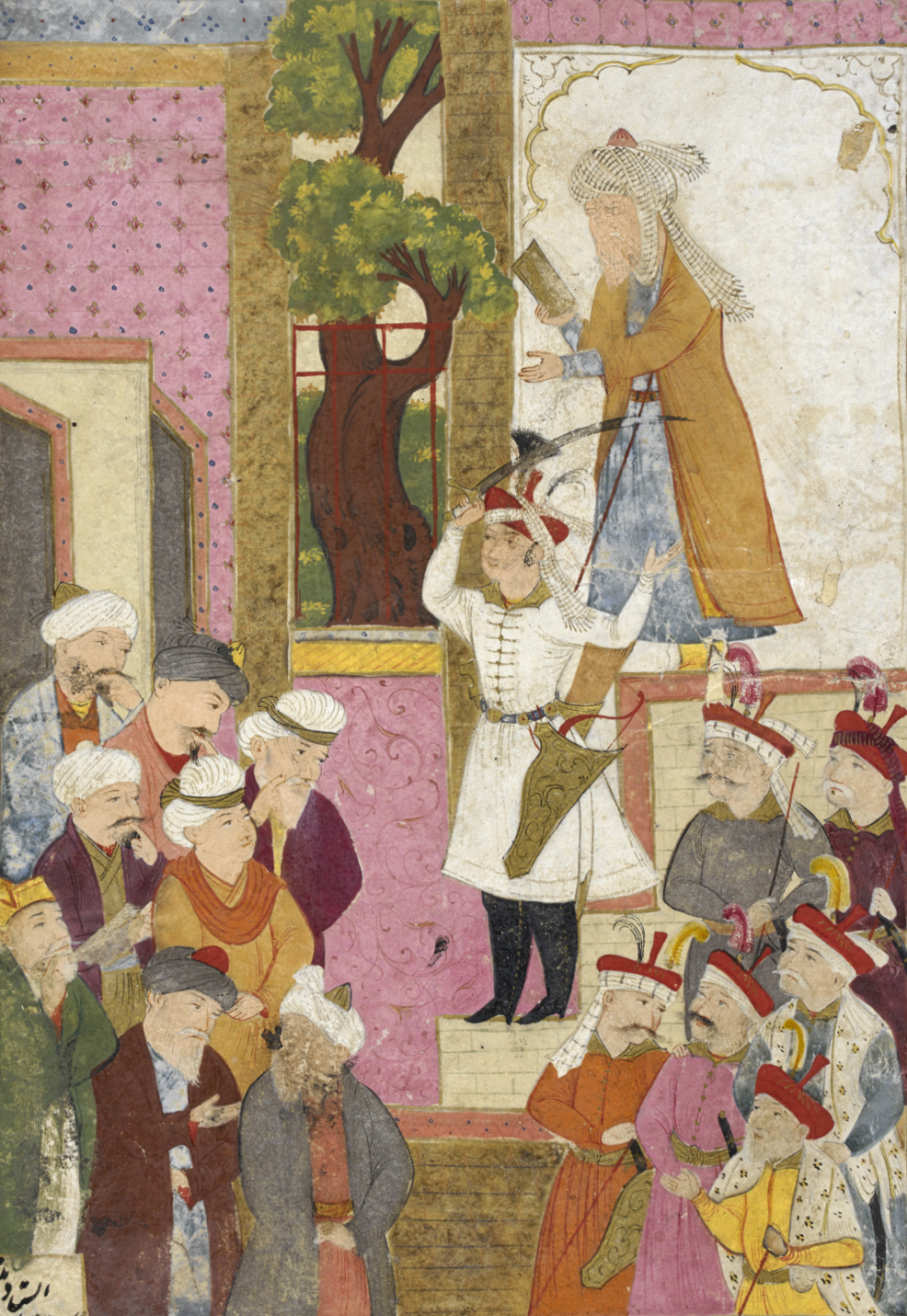
Shah Ismail I declaring Shia Islam as the official religion of his kingdom. Circa 1650 miniature

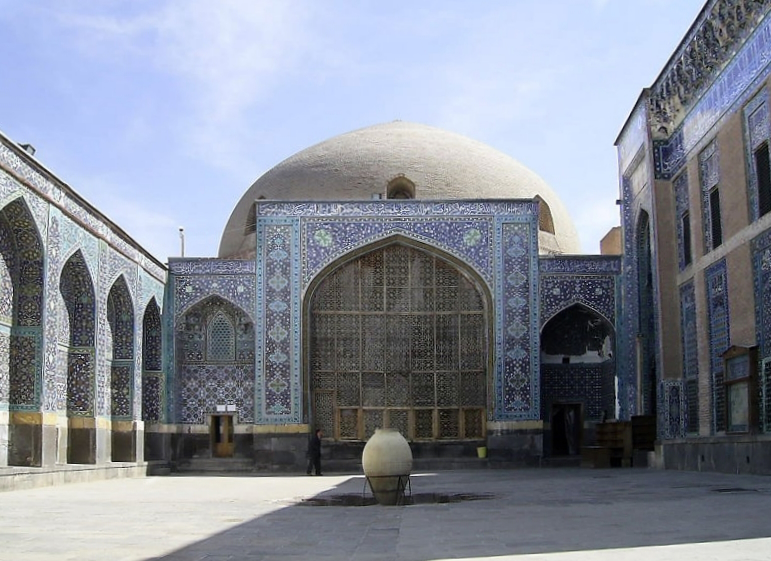
The Jannatsarā (جنت‌سرا, "Heavenly Palace"), was built by Shah Tahmasp in 1537 at the Shrine of Sheikh Safi, Ardabil.

Even though the Safavids were not the first Shiʻi rulers in Iran, they played a crucial role in forcefully making Shiʻa Islam the official religion in the whole of Iran, as well as what is nowadays the Republic of Azerbaijan. There were large Shiʻi communities in some cities like Qom, Sabzevar, and Kashan as early as the 8th century. In the 10th and 11th centuries the Buyids, originally Zaydi, then Twelver, ruled most of western Iran and Iraq. Shiʻi dynasties were re-established in Iran after the Mongol Empire, such as Sarbadars in Khorasan being the most important. The Ilkhanid ruler Öljaitü converted to Twelver Shiʻism in the 13th century.

Following his conquest of Iran and Azerbaijan, Ismail I made conversion mandatory for the largely Sunni population. The Sunni Ulema or clergy were either killed or exiled. Ismail I brought in mainstream Twelver Shia religious leaders and granted them land and money in return for loyalty. Later, during the Safavid and especially Qajar period, the Shiʻi Ulema's power increased and they were able to exercise a role, independent of or compatible with the government.

==== Emergence of a clerical aristocracy ====
An important feature of the Safavid society was the alliance that emerged between the ulama (the religious class) and the merchant community. The latter included merchants trading in the bazaars, the trade and artisan guilds (asnāf) and members of the quasi-religious organizations run by dervishes (futuvva). Because of the relative insecurity of property ownership in Iran, many private landowners secured their lands by donating them to the clergy as so called vaqf. They would thus retain the official ownership and secure their land from being confiscated by royal commissioners or local governors, as long as a percentage of the revenues from the land went to the ulama. Increasingly, members of the religious class, particularly the mujtahids and the seyyeds, gained full ownership of these lands, and, according to contemporary historian Iskandar Munshi, Iran started to witness the emergence of a new and significant group of landowners.

===== Akhbaris versus Usulis =====
The Akhbari movement "crystalized" as a "separate movement" with the writings of Muhammad Amin al-Astarabadi (died 1627 AD). It rejected the use of reasoning in deriving verdicts and believed that only the Quran, hadith, (prophetic sayings and recorded opinions of the Imams) and consensus should be used as sources to derive verdicts (fatāwā). Unlike Usulis, Akhbari did and do not follow marjas who practice ijtihad.

It achieved its greatest influence in the late Safavid and early post-Safavid era, when it dominated Twelver Shia Islam. However, shortly thereafter Muhammad Baqir Behbahani (died 1792), along with other Usuli mujtahids, crushed the Akhbari movement. It remains only a small minority in the Shiʻi world. One result of the resolution of this conflict was the rise in importance of the concept of ijtihad and the position of the mujtahid (as opposed to other ulama) in the 18th and early 19th centuries. It was from this time that the division of the Shia world into mujtahid (those who could follow their own independent judgment) and muqallid (those who had to follow the rulings of a mujtahid) took place. According to author Moojan Momen, "up to the middle of the 19th century there were very few mujtahids (three or four) anywhere at any one time," but "several hundred existed by the end of the 19th century".

===== Allamah Majlisi =====
Muhammad Baqir Majlisi, commonly referenced to using the title Allamah, was a highly influential scholar during the 17th century (Safavid era). Majlisi's works emphasized his desire to purge Twelver Shiʻism of the influences of mysticism and philosophy, and to propagate an ideal of strict adherence to the Islamic law (sharia). Majlisi promoted specifically Shiʻi rituals such as mourning for Hussein ibn Ali and visitation (ziyarat) of the tombs of the Imams and Imamzadas, stressing "the concept of the Imams as mediators and intercessors for man with God".

== Government ==
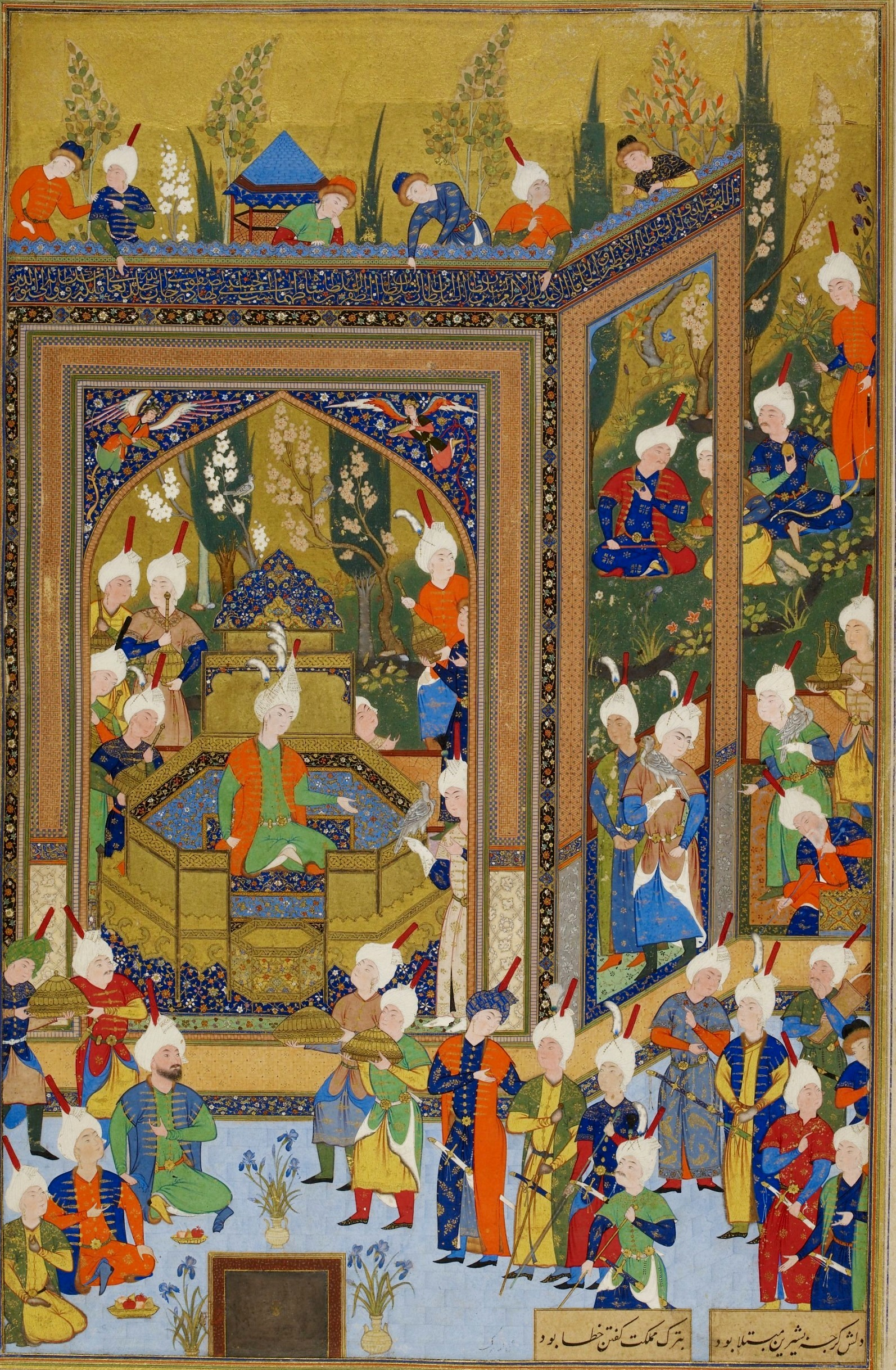
A depiction of the court of Shah Tahmasp, with the name and titles of the ruler inscribed over the building. Khamsa of Nizami of Shah Tahmasp, 1539-1543.

The Safavid state was one of checks and balance, both within the government and on a local level. At the apex of this system was the shah, with total power over the state, legitimized by his bloodline as a sayyid, or descendant of Muhammad. So absolute was his power, that the French merchant, and later ambassador to Iran, Jean Chardin thought the Safavid Shahs ruled their land with an iron fist and often in a despotic manner. To ensure transparency and avoid decisions being made that circumvented the shah, a complex system of bureaucracy and departmental procedures had been put in place that prevented fraud. Every office had a deputy or superintendent, whose job was to keep records of all actions of the state officials and report directly to the shah. The shah himself exercised his own measures for keeping his ministers under control by fostering an atmosphere of rivalry and competitive surveillance. And since the Safavid society was meritocratic, and successions seldom were made on the basis of heritage, this meant that government offices constantly felt the pressure of being under surveillance and had to make sure they governed in the best interest of their leader, and not merely their own.

=== Structure ===
There probably did not exist any parliament, as we know them today. But the Portuguese ambassador to the Safavids, De Gouvea, still mentions the Council of State in his records, which perhaps was a term for governmental gatherings of the time.

The highest level in the government was that of the prime minister, or grand vizier (Etemad-e Dowlat), who was always chosen from among doctors of law. He enjoyed tremendous power and control over national affairs as he was the immediate deputy of the shah. No act of the shah was valid without the counter seal of the prime minister. But even he stood accountable to a deputy (vak’anevis), who kept records of his decision-makings and notified the shah. Second to the prime minister post were the general of the revenues (mostoufi-ye mamalek), or finance minister, and the Divanbegi, minister of justice. The latter was the final appeal in civil and criminal cases, and his office stood next to the main entrance to the Ali Qapu palace. In earlier times, the shah had been closely involved in judicial proceedings, but this part of the royal duty was neglected by Shah Safi and the later kings.

Next in authority were the generals: the general of the Royal Troops (the Shahsevans), General of the Musketeers, General of the Ghulams and The Master of Artillery. A separate official, the commander-in-chief, was appointed to be the head of these officials.

=== The royal court ===
As for the royal household, the highest post was that of the nazir, court minister. He was perhaps the closest advisor to the shah, and, as such, functioned as his eyes and ears within the court. His primary job was to appoint and supervise all the officials of the household and to be their contact with the shah. But his responsibilities also included that of being the treasurer of the shah's properties. This meant that even the prime minister, who held the highest office in the state, had to work in association with the Nazir when it came to managing those transactions that directly related to the shah.

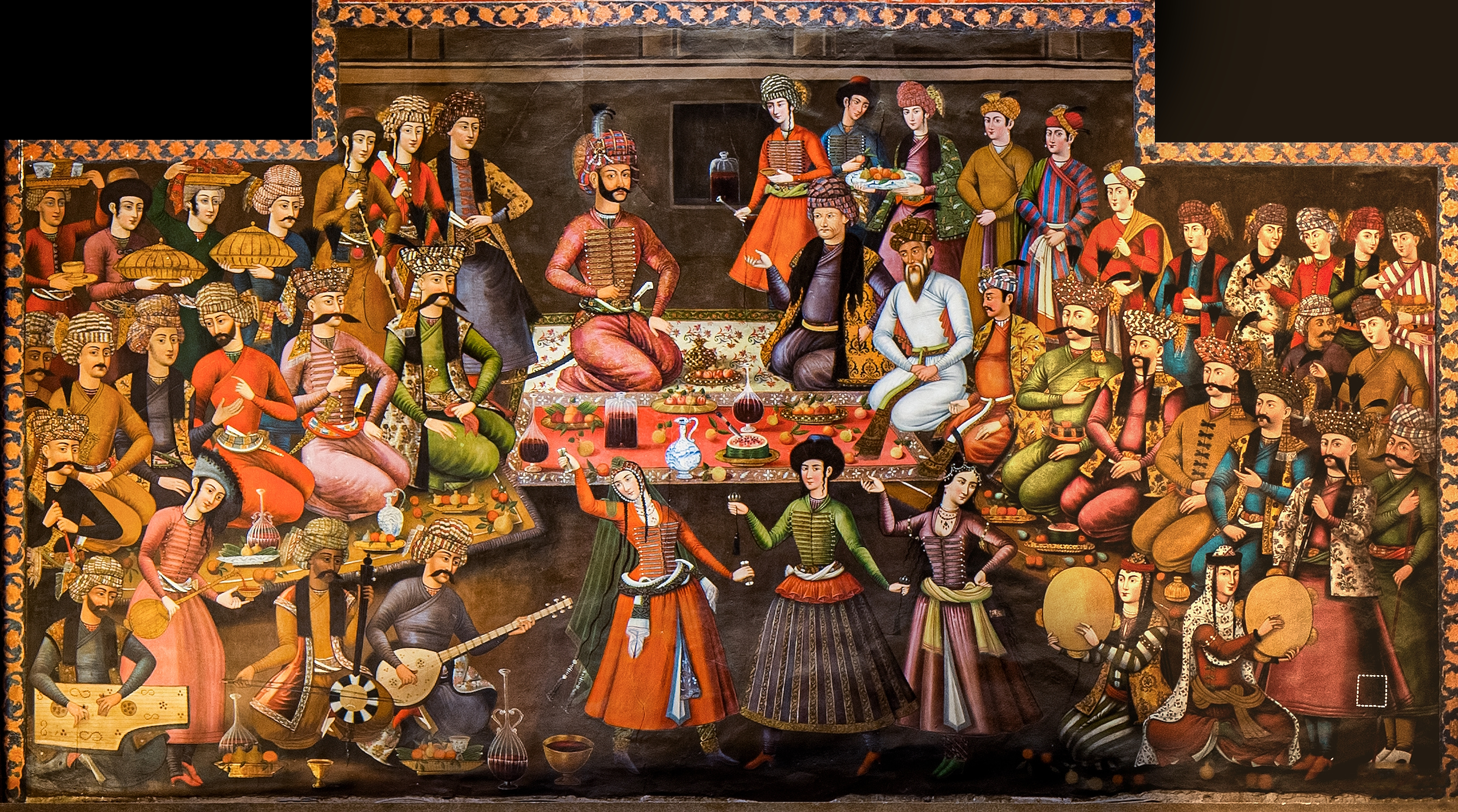
Contemporary court scene, depicting the meeting of Abbas II with the deposed Khanate of Bukhara ruler Nader Mohammad Khan in 1646. Chehel Sotoun frescoe, Isfahan, painted circa 1647, soon after the events

The second most senior appointment was the grand steward (Ichik Agasi bashi), who would always accompany the shah and was easily recognizable because of the great baton that he carried with him. He was responsible for introducing all guests, receiving petitions presented to the shah and reading them if required. Next in line were the Master of the Royal Stables (Mirakor bashi) and the Master of the Hunt (Mirshekar bashi). The shah had stables in all the principal towns, and Shah Abbas was said to have about 30,000 horses in studs around the country. In addition to these, there were separate officials appointed for the caretaking of royal banquets and for entertainment.

Chardin specifically noticed the rank of doctors and astrologers and the respect that the shahs had for them. The shah had a dozen of each in his service and would usually be accompanied by three doctors and three astrologers, who were authorized to sit by his side on various occasions. The Chief Physician (Hakim-bashi) was a highly considered member of the Royal court, and the most revered astrologer of the court was given the title Munajjim-bashi (Chief Astrologer).

The Safavid court was furthermore a rich mix of peoples from its earliest days. As David Blow states, foremost among the courtiers were the old nobility of Turkoman Qizilbash lords and their sons. Although already by the early years of king Abbas' reign (r. 1588–1629) they were no longer controlling the state, the Turkoman Qizilbash continued to provide many of the senior army officers and to fill important administrative and ceremonial offices in the royal household. There were the Persians who still dominated the bureaucracy and under Abbas held the two highest government offices of Grand Vizier and Comptroller-General of the Revenues (mostoufi-ye mamalek), which was the nearest thing to a finance minister. There were also the large number of gholams or "slaves of the shah", who were mainly Georgians, Circassians and Armenians. As a result of Abbas' reforms, they held high offices in the army, the administration and the royal household. Last but by no means least there were the palace eunuchs who were also ghulams – "white" eunuchs largely from the Caucasus, and "black" eunuchs from India and Africa. Under Abbas, the eunuchs became an increasingly important element at the court.

During the first century of the dynasty, the primary court language remained Azeri, although this increasingly changed after the capital was moved to Isfahan. David Blow adds; "it seems likely that most, if not all, of the Turkoman grandees at the court also spoke Persian, which was the language of the administration and culture, as well as of the majority of the population. But the reverse seems not to have been true. When Abbas had a lively conversation in Turkish with the Italian traveller Pietro Della Valle, in front of his courtiers, he had to translate the conversation afterwards into Persian for the benefit of most of those present." Lastly, due to the large amount of Georgians, Circassians, and Armenians at the Safavid court (the gholams and in the harem), the Georgian, Circassian and Armenian languages were spoken as well, since these were their mother tongues. Abbas himself was able to speak Georgian as well.

=== Local governments ===
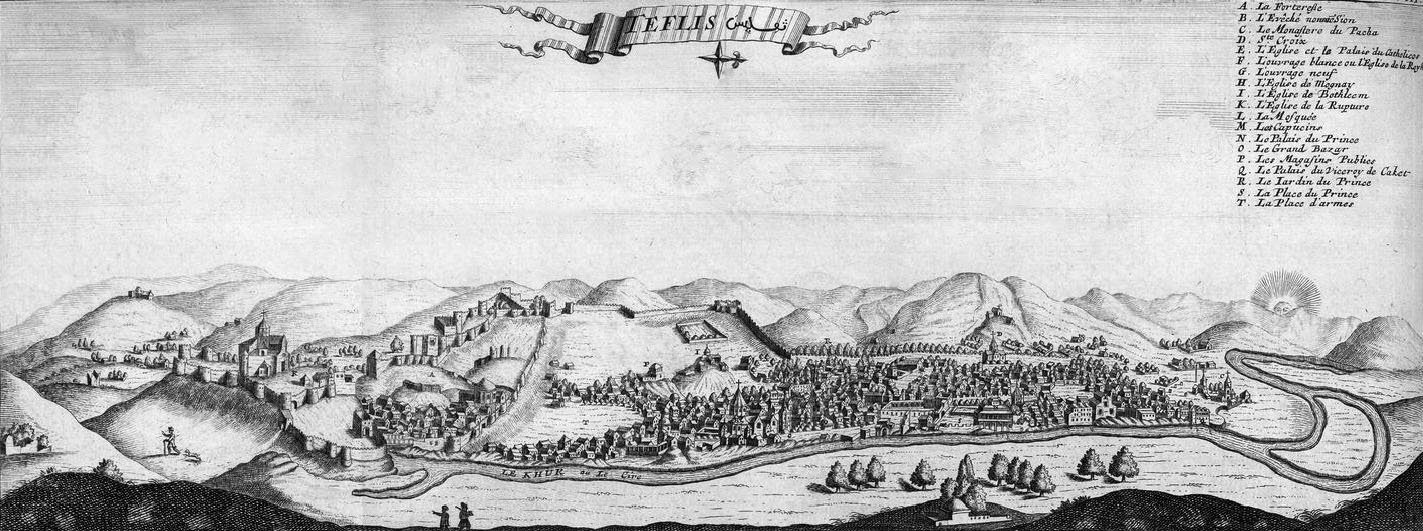
View of Tbilisi by French traveler Jean Chardin, 1671.

On a local level, the government was divided into public land and royal possessions. The public land was under the rule of local governors, or Khans. Since the earliest days of the Safavid dynasty, the Qizilbash generals had been appointed to most of these posts. They ruled their provinces like petty shahs and spent all their revenues on their own province, only presenting the shah with the balance. In return, they had to keep ready a standing army at all times and provide the shah with military assistance upon his request. It was also requested from them that they appoint a lawyer (vakil) to the Court who would inform them on matters pertaining to the provincial affairs. Shah Abbas I intended to decrease the power of the Qizilbash by bringing some of these provinces into his direct control, creating so called Crown Provinces (Khassa). But it was Shah Safi, under influence by his prime minister, Saru Taqi, that initiated the program of trying to increase the royal revenues by buying land from the governors and putting in place local commissioners. In time, this proved to become a burden to the people that were under the direct rule of the shah, as these commissioners, unlike the former governors, had little knowledge about the local communities that they controlled and were primarily interested in increasing the income of the shah. And, while it was in the governors' own interest to increase the productivity and prosperity of their provinces, the commissioners received their income directly from the royal treasury and, as such, did not care so much about investing in agriculture and local industries. Thus, the majority of the people suffered from rapacity and corruption carried out in the name of the shah.

=== Democratic institutions in an authoritarian society ===
In 16th and 17th century Iran, there existed a considerable number of local democratic institutions. Examples of such were the trade and artisan guilds, which had started to appear in Iran from the 1500s. Also, there were the quasi-religious fraternities called futuvva, which were run by local dervishes. Another official selected by the consensus of the local community was the kadkhoda, who functioned as a common law administrator. The local sheriff (kalantar), who was not elected by the people but directly appointed by the shah, and whose function was to protect the people against injustices on the part of the local governors, supervised the kadkhoda.

=== Law ===
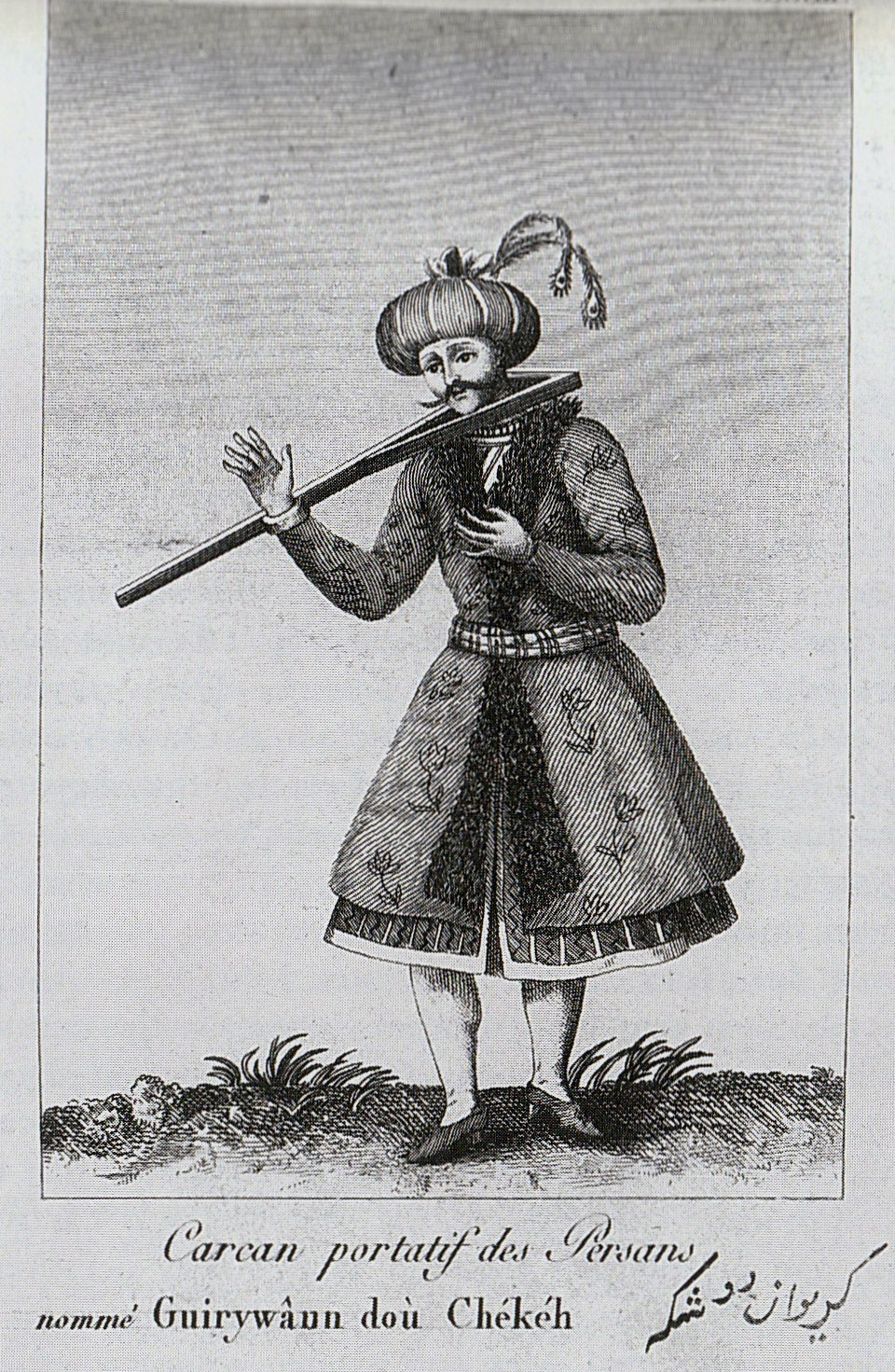
The Karkan, a tool used for punishment of state criminals

In Safavid Iran there was little distinction between theology and jurisprudence, or between divine justice and human justice, and it all went under Islamic jurisprudence (fiqh). The legal system was built up of two branches: civil law, which had its roots in sharia, received wisdom, and urf, meaning traditional experience and very similar to the Western form of common law. While the imams and judges of law applied civil law in their practice, urf was primarily exercised by the local commissioners, who inspected the villages on behalf of the shah, and by the minister of justice (Divanbegi). The latter were all secular functionaries working on behalf of the shah.

The highest level in the legal system was the Minister of Justice, and the law officers were divided into senior appointments, such as the magistrate (darughah), inspector (visir), and recorder (vak’anevis). The lesser officials were the qazi, corresponding a civil lieutenant, who ranked under the local governors and functioned as judges in the provinces.

According to Chardin:

There were no particular place assigned for the administration of justice. Each magistrate executes justice in his own house in a large room opening on to a courtyard or a garden which is raised two or three feet above the ground. The Judge is seated at one end of the room having a writer and a man of law by his side.

Chardin also noted that bringing cases into court in Iran was easier than in the West. The judge (qazi) was informed of relevant points involved and would decide whether or not to take up the case. Having agreed to do so, a sergeant would investigate and summon the defendant, who was then obliged to pay the fee of the sergeant. The two parties with their witnesses pleaded their respective cases, usually without any counsel, and the judge would pass his judgment after the first or second hearing.

Criminal justice was entirely separate from civil law and was judged upon common law administered through the Minister of Justice, local governors and the Court minister (the Nazir). Despite being based on urf, it relied upon certain sets of legal principles. Murder was punishable by death, and the penalty for bodily injuries was invariably the bastinado. Robbers had their right wrists amputated the first time, and sentenced to death on any subsequent occasion. State criminals were subjected to the karkan, a triangular wooden collar placed around the neck. On extraordinary occasions when the shah took justice into his own hand, he would dress himself up in red for the importance of the event, according to ancient tradition.

=== Military ===
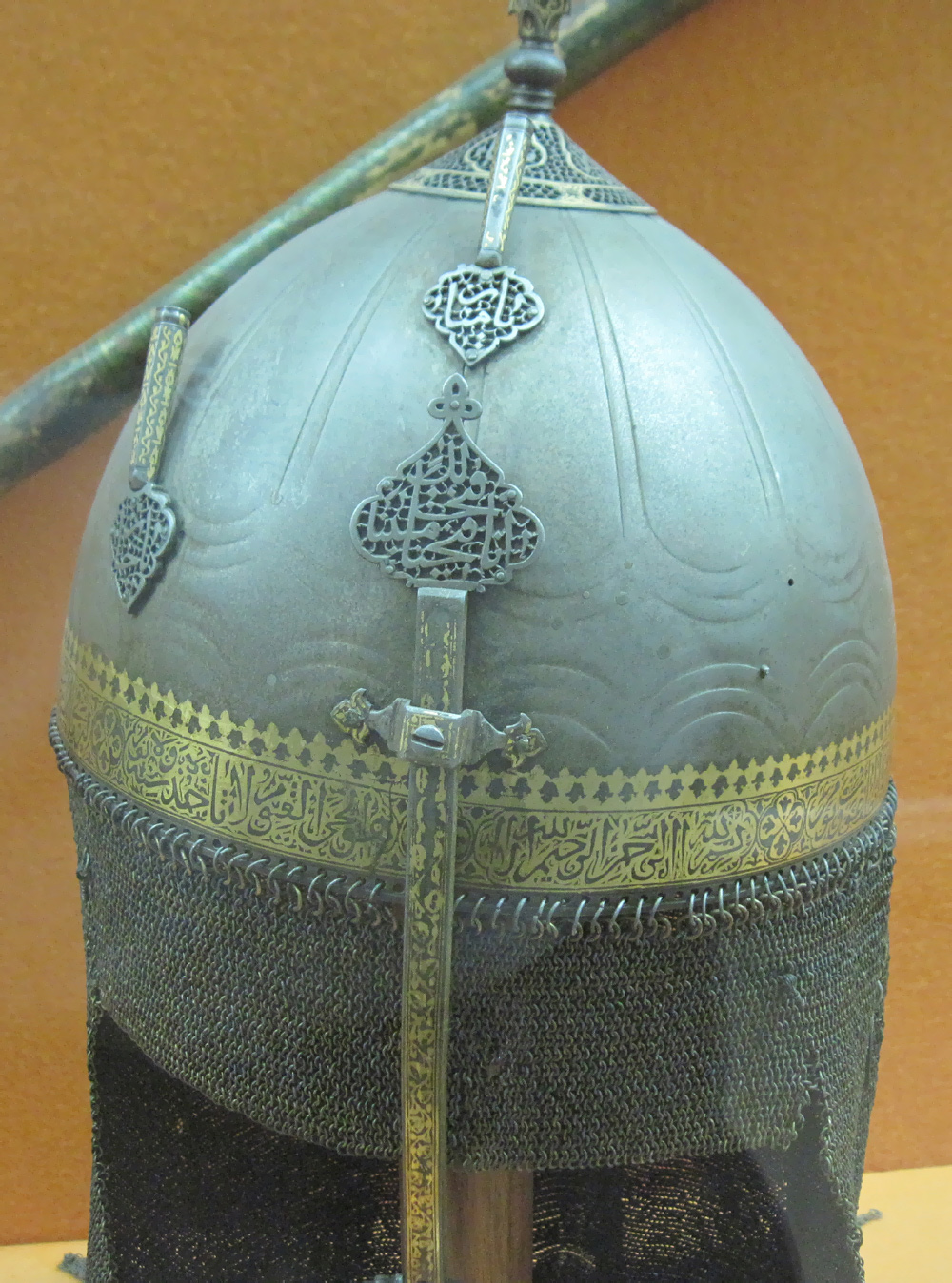
A Safavid helmet

The Qizilbash were a wide variety of Shiʻi Muslims (ghulāt) and mostly Turcoman militant groups who helped found the Safavid Empire. Their military power was essential during the reign of the shahs Ismail and Tahmasp. The Qizilbash tribes were essential to the military of Iran until the rule of Shah Abbas I – their leaders were able to exercise enormous influence and participate in court intrigues (assassinating Shah Ismail II for example).

A major problem faced by Ismail I after the establishment of the Safavid state was how to bridge the gap between the two major ethnic groups in that state: the Qizilbash ("Redhead") Turcomans, the "men of sword" of classical Islamic society whose military prowess had brought him to power, and the Persian elements, the "men of the pen", who filled the ranks of the bureaucracy and the religious establishment in the Safavid state as they had done for centuries under previous rulers of Iran, be they Arabs, Mongols, or Turkmens. As Vladimir Minorsky put it, friction between these two groups was inevitable, because the Qizilbash "were no party to the national Persian tradition".

Between 1508 and 1524, the year of Ismail's death, the shah appointed five successive Persians to the office of vakil. When the second Persian vakil was placed in command of a Safavid army in Transoxiana, the Qizilbash, considering it a dishonor to be obliged to serve under him, deserted him on the battlefield with the result that he was slain. The fourth vakil was murdered by the Qizilbash, and the fifth was put to death by them.

==== Reforms in the military ====
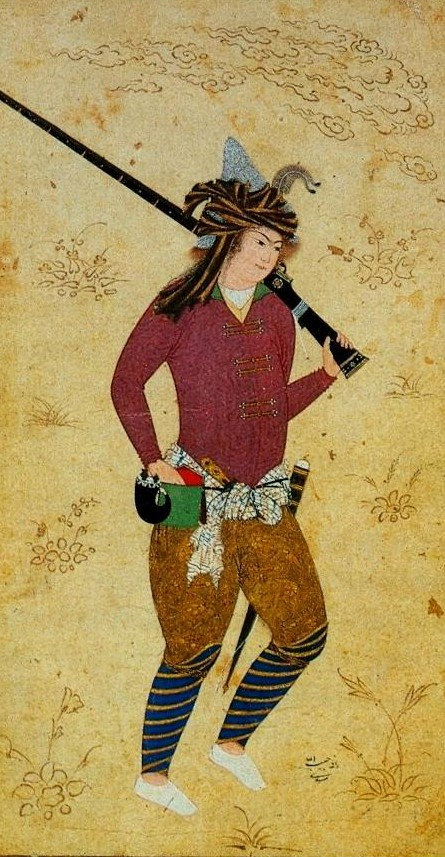
Persian Musketeer in time of Abbas I by Habib-Allah Mashadi after Falsafi (Berlin Museum of Islamic Art)

Shah Abbas realized that in order to retain absolute control over his empire without antagonizing the Qizilbash, he needed to create reforms that reduced the dependency that the shah had on their military support. Part of these reforms was the creation of the 3rd force within the aristocracy and all other functions within the empire, but even more important in undermining the authority of the Qizilbash was the introduction of the Royal Corps into the military. This military force would serve the shah only and eventually consisted of four separate branches:

- Shahsevans: these were 12,000 strong and built up from the small group of qurchis that Shah Abbas had inherited from his predecessor. The Shahsevans, or "Friends of the King", were Qizilbash tribesmen who had forsaken their tribal allegiance for allegiance to the shah alone.
- Ghulams: Tahmasp I had started introducing huge amounts of Georgian, Circassian and Armenian slaves and deportees from the Caucasus, of whom a sizeable amount would become part of the future ghulam system. Shah Abbas expanded this program significantly and fully implemented it, and eventually created a force of 15,000 ghulam cavalrymen and 3,000 ghulam royal bodyguards. With the advent of the brother's Shirley at Abbas' court and by the efforts of statesman Allahverdi Khan, from 1600 onwards, the ghulam fighting regiments were further dramatically expanded under Abbas reaching 25,000. Under Abbas, this force amounted to a total of near 40,000 soldiers paid for and beholden to the shah. They would become the elite soldiers of the Safavid armies (like the Ottoman Janissary).
- Musketeers: realizing the advantages that the Ottomans had because of their firearms, Shah Abbas was at pains to equip both the qurchi and the ghulam soldiers with up-to-date weaponry. More importantly, for the first time in Iranian history, a substantial infantry corps of musketeers (tofang-chis), numbering 12 000, was created.
- Artillery Corps: with the help of Westerners, he also formed an artillery corps of 12 000 men, although this was the weakest element in his army. According to Sir Thomas Herbert, who accompanied an English embassy to Iran in 1628, the Persians relied heavily on support from the Europeans in manufacturing cannons. It was not until a century later, when Nader Shah became the Commander in Chief of the military that sufficient effort was put into modernizing the artillery corps and the Persians managed to excel and become self-sufficient in the manufacturing of firearms.

Despite the reforms, the Qizilbash would remain the strongest and most effective element within the military, accounting for more than half of its total strength. But the creation of this large standing army, that, for the first time in Safavid history, was serving directly under the shah, significantly reduced their influence, and perhaps any possibilities for the type of civil unrest that had caused havoc during the reign of the previous shahs.

== Economy ==
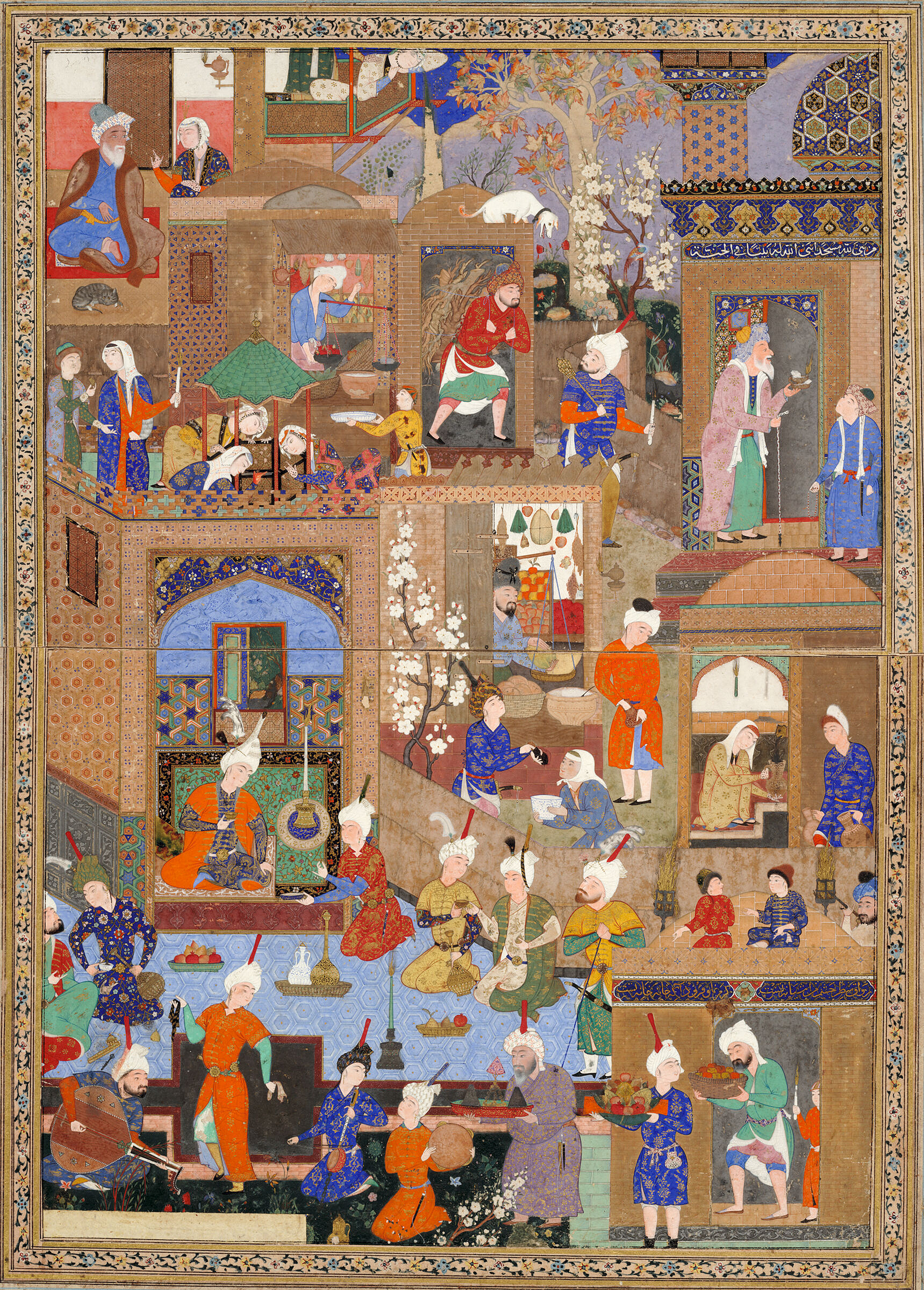
Nighttime in a City: urban activity in the Safavid capital of Tabriz, painted circa 1540 for Shah Tahmasp (Sackler Museum, 1958.76).

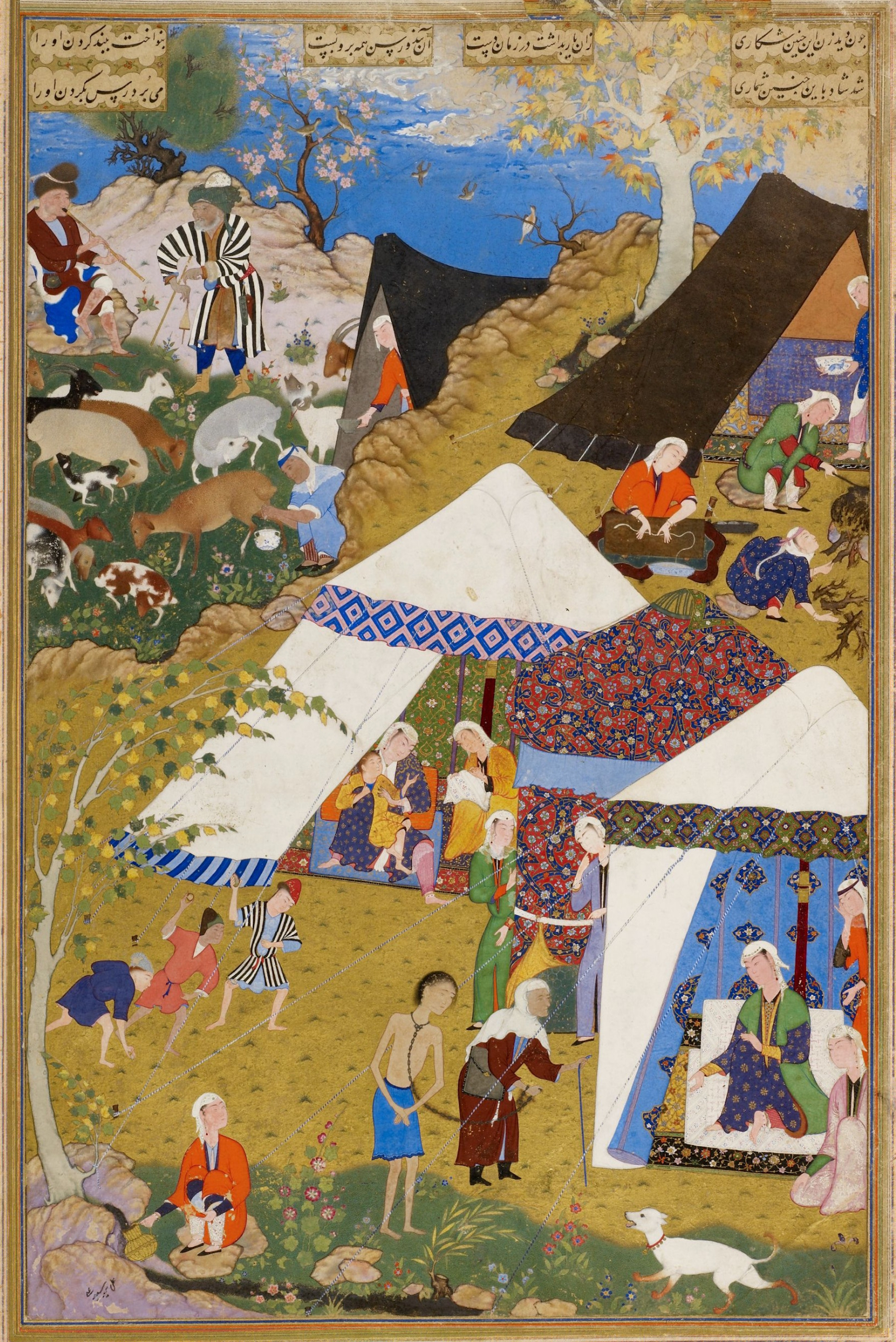
Majnun is led in chains before Laylī. Scenes of agricultural life from the Khamsa by Nizami, British Library Or. 2265 (1539-1543).

The growth of Safavid economy was fuelled by the stability which allowed the agriculture to thrive, as well as trade, due to Iran's position between the burgeoning civilizations of Europe to its west and India and Islamic Central Asia to its east and north. The Silk Road which led through northern Iran was revived in the 16th century. Abbas I also supported direct trade with Europe, particularly England and The Netherlands which sought Persian carpet, silk and textiles. Other exports were horses, goat hair, pearls and an inedible bitter almond hadam-talka used as a spice in India. The main imports were spice, textiles (woolens from Europe, cottons from Gujarat), metals, coffee, and sugar.

According to traveller Jean Chardin in 1660 farmers in Iran had higher living standards than farmers in the most fertile European countries.

=== Agriculture ===
According to the historian Roger Savory, the twin bases of the domestic economy were pastoralism and agriculture. And, just as the higher levels of the social hierarchy was divided between the Turkish "men of the sword" and the Persian "men of the pen", so were the lower levels divided between the Turcoman tribes, who were cattle breeders and lived apart from the surrounding population, and the Persians, who were settled agriculturalists.

The Safavid economy was to a large extent based on agriculture and taxation of agricultural products. According to the French jeweller Jean Chardin, the variety in agricultural products in Iran was unrivaled in Europe and consisted of fruits and vegetables never even heard of in Europe. Chardin was present at some feasts in Isfahan were there were more than fifty different kinds of fruit. He thought that there was nothing like it in France or Italy.

Tobacco grew all over the country and was as strong as that grown in Brazil. Saffron was the best in the world... Melons were regarded as excellent fruit, and there were more than 50 different sorts, the finest of which came from Khorasan. And in spite of being transported for more than thirty days, they were fresh when they reached Isfahan... After melons the finest fruits were grapes and dates, and the best dates were grown in Jahrom.

Despite this, he was disappointed when travelling the country and witnessing the abundance of land that was not irrigated, or the fertile plains that were not cultivated, something he thought was in stark contrast to Europe. He blamed this on misgovernment, the sparse population of the country, and lack of appreciation of agriculture amongst the Persians.

In the period prior to Shah Abbas I, most of the land was assigned to officials (civil, military and religious). From the time of Shah Abbas onwards, more land was brought under the direct control of the shah. And since agriculture accounted for by far largest share of tax revenue, he took measures to expand it. What remained unchanged, was the "crop-sharing agreement" between whoever was the landlord, and the farmer. This agreement consisted of five elements: land, water, plough-animals, seed and labour. Each element constituted 20 percent of the crop production, and if, for instance, the farmer provided the labour force and the animals, he would be entitled to 40 percent of the earnings. According to contemporary historians, though, the landlord always had the worst of the bargain with the farmer in the crop-sharing agreements. In general, the farmers lived in comfort, and they were well paid and wore good clothes, although it was also noted that they were subject to forced labour and lived under heavy demands.

=== Travel and caravanserais ===
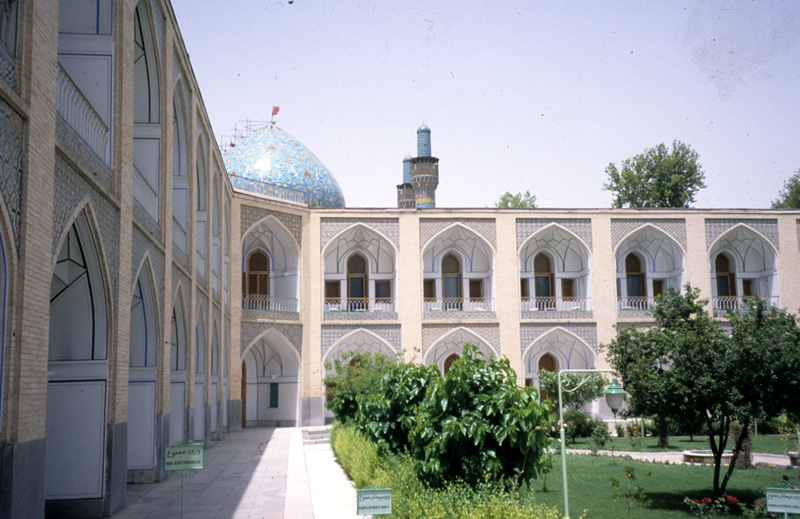
The Mothers Inn caravanserai in Isfahan, that was built during the reign of Shah Abbas II, was a luxury resort meant for the wealthiest merchants and selected guests of the shah. Today it is a luxury hotel and goes under the name of Hotel Abassi.

Horses were the most important of all the beasts of burden, and the best were brought in from Arabia and Central Asia. They were costly because of the widespread trade in them, including to Turkey and India. The next most important mount, when traveling through Iran, was the mule. Also, the camel was a good investment for the merchant, as they cost nearly nothing to feed, carried a lot of weight and could travel almost anywhere.

Under the governance of the strong shahs, especially during the first half of the 17th century, traveling through Iran was easy because of good roads and the caravanserais, or roadside inns, that were strategically placed along the route. Thévenot and Tavernier commented that the Iranian caravanserais were better built and cleaner than their Turkish counterparts. According to Chardin, they were also more abundant than in the Mughal or Ottoman Empires, where they were less frequent but larger. Caravanserais were designed especially to benefit poorer travelers, as they could stay there for as long as they wished, without payment for lodging. During the reign of Shah Abbas I, as he tried to upgrade the Silk Road to improve the commercial prosperity of the Empire, an abundance of caravanserais, bridges, bazaars and roads were built, and this strategy was followed by wealthy merchants who also profited from the increase in trade. To uphold the standard, another source of revenue was needed, and road toll was collected by guards (rah-dars) that were stationed along the trading routes. They in turn provided for the safety of the travelers, and both Thevenot and Tavernier stressed the safety of traveling in 17th century Iran, and the courtesy and refinement of the policing guards. The Italian traveler Pietro Della Valle was impressed by an encounter with one of these road guards:

He examined our baggage, but in the most obliging manner possible, not opening our trunks or packages, and was satisfied with a small tax, which was his due...

=== Foreign trade and the Silk Road ===
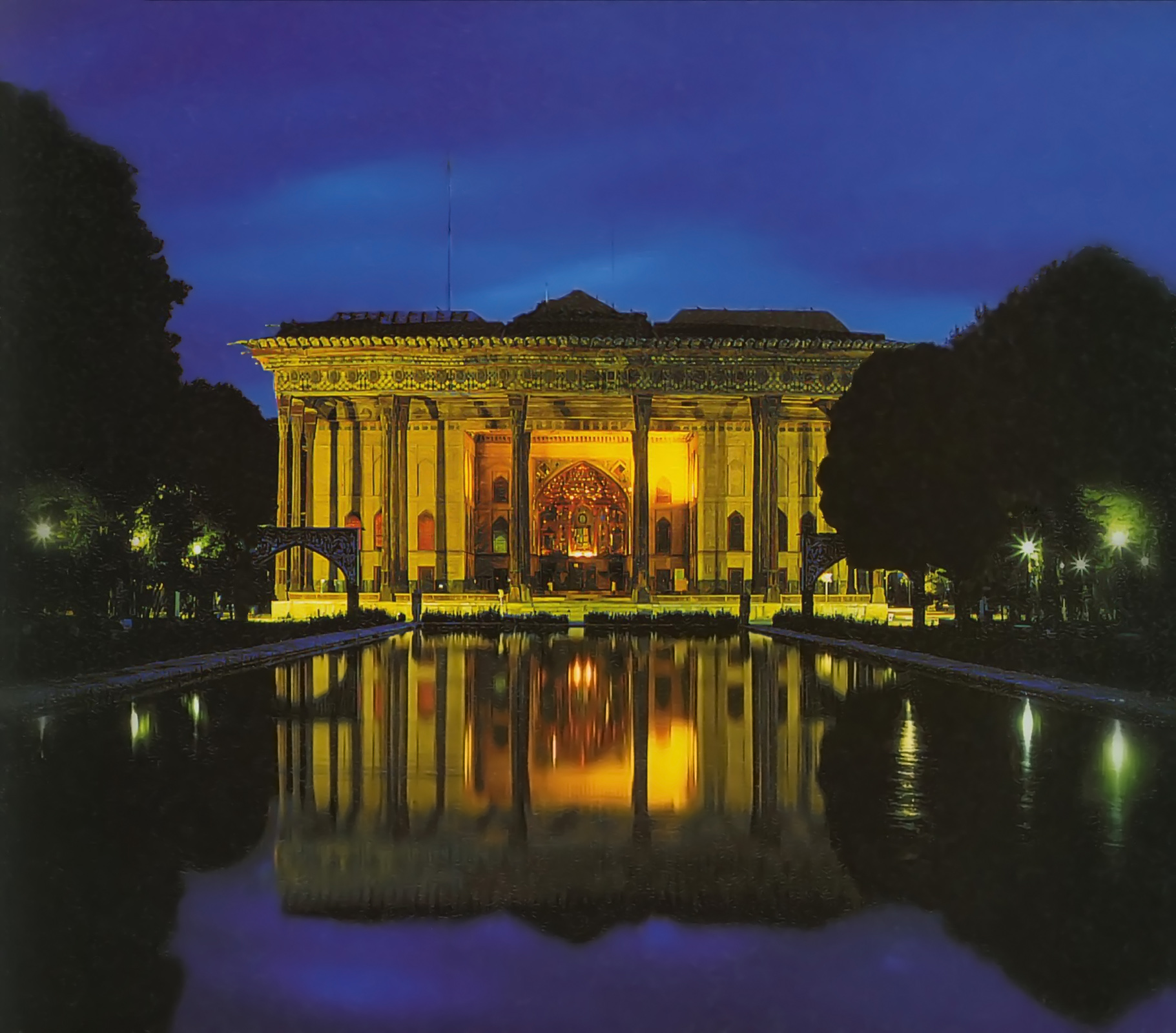
The Chehel Sotoun Palace in Isfahan was where the shah would meet foreign dignitaries and embassies. It is famous for the frescoes that cover its walls.

The Portuguese Empire and the discovery of the trading route around the Cape of Good Hope in 1487 not only hit a death blow to Venice as a trading nation, but it also hurt the trade that was going on along the Silk Road and especially the Persian Gulf. They correctly identified the three key points to control all seaborne trade between Asia and Europe: The Gulf of Aden, The Persian Gulf and the Straits of Malacca by cutting off and controlling these strategic locations with high taxation. In 1602, Shah Abbas I drove the Portuguese out of Bahrain, but he needed naval assistance from the newly arrived English East India Company to finally expel them from the Strait of Hormuz and regain control of this trading route. He convinced the English to assist him by allowing them to open factories in Shiraz, Isfahan and Jask. With the later end of the Portuguese Empire, the English, Dutch and French in particular gained easier access to Persian seaborne trade, although they, unlike the Portuguese, did not arrive as colonisers, but as merchant adventurers. The terms of trade were not imposed on the Safavid shahs, but rather negotiated.

Furthermore, the Safavids maintained a sizeable sphere of influence overseas, particularly in the Deccan region of India. The Sultanates of Ahmednagar, Bijapur, and Golconda all sought Persian suzerainty not just because of religious or cultural ties, but also because of the need for a counterweight to Mughal expansion. The Persians complied, and thousands of Persians emigrated to the Deccan during the 16th and 17th centuries, continuing a process that already began under the Bahmani Sultanate of the Deccan. From here, Persian traders ventured eastwards to Southeast Asian kingdoms, most notably Ayutthaya Siam, where influential Persian families like the Bunnag helped foster cordial diplomatic relations between Thailand and Iran, as evidenced in the expedition of Suleyman's Ship. The Persians were also active in the Aceh Sultanate, the Brunei Sultanate, the Demak Sultanate, and Dai Viet.

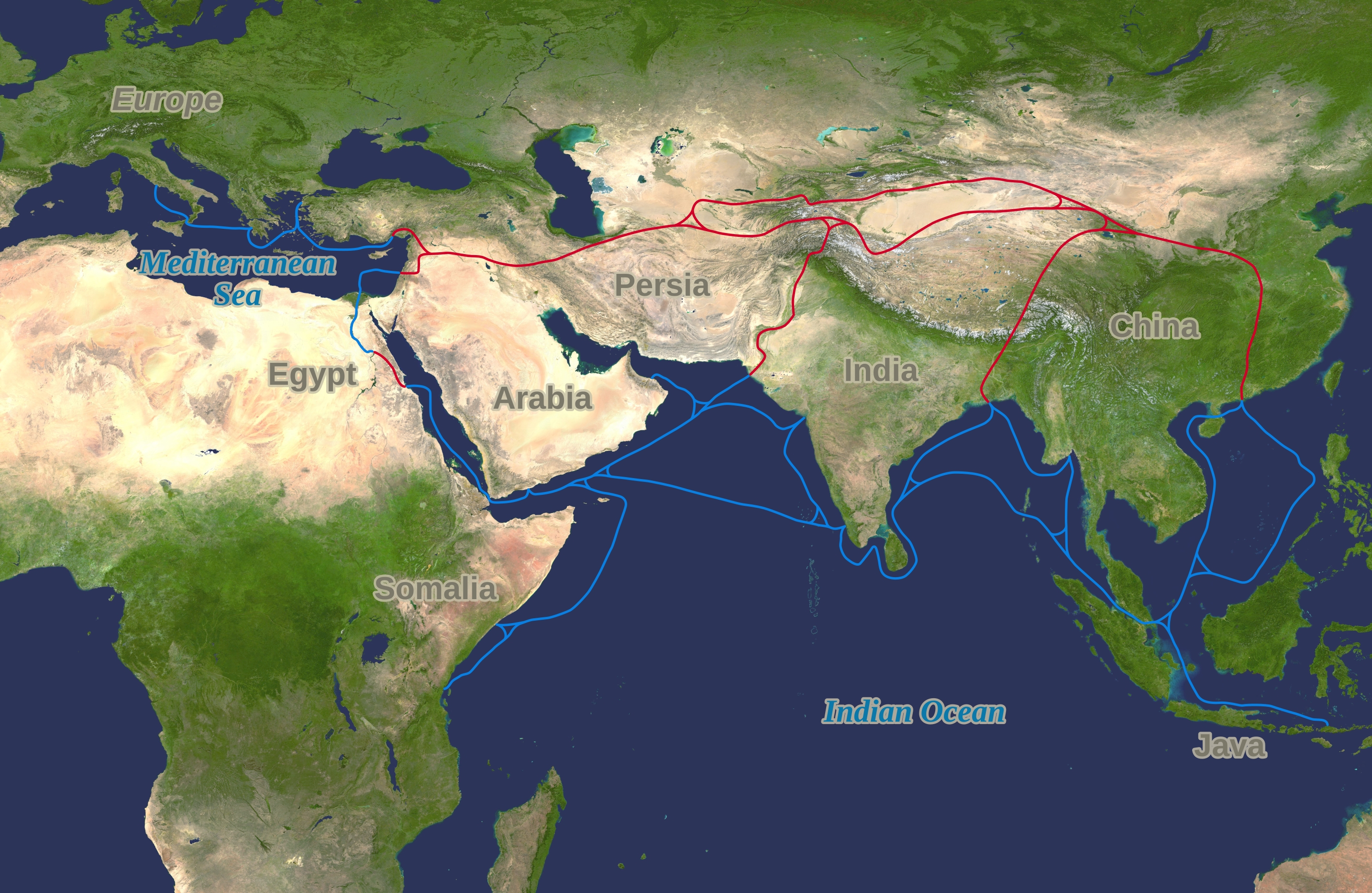
The Silk Road

In the long term, however, the seaborne trade route was of less significance to the Persians than was the traditional Silk Road. Lack of investment in ship building and the navy provided the Europeans with the opportunity to monopolize this trading route. The land-borne trade would thus continue to provide the bulk of revenues to the Iranian state from transit taxes. The revenue came not so much from exports, as from the custom charges and transit dues levied on goods passing through the country. Shah Abbas was determined to greatly expand this trade, but faced the problem of having to deal with the Ottomans, who controlled the two most vital routes: the route across Arabia to the Mediterranean ports, and the route through Anatolia and Constantinople. A third route was therefore devised which circumvented Ottoman territory. By travelling across the Caspian Sea to the north, they would reach Russia. And with the assistance of the Muscovy Company they could cross over to Moscow, reaching Europe via Poland. This trading route proved to be of vital importance, especially during times of war with the Ottomans.

By the end of the 17th century, the Dutch had become dominant in the trade that went via the Persian Gulf, having won most trade agreements, and managed to strike deals before the English or French were able to. They particularly established monopoly of the spice and porcelain trade between the Far East and Iran. Protected by Dutch naval power, competition from Bengali silk and Sino-Japanese porcelain contributed to the decline of the Safavid economy during the late 17th century.

== Culture ==
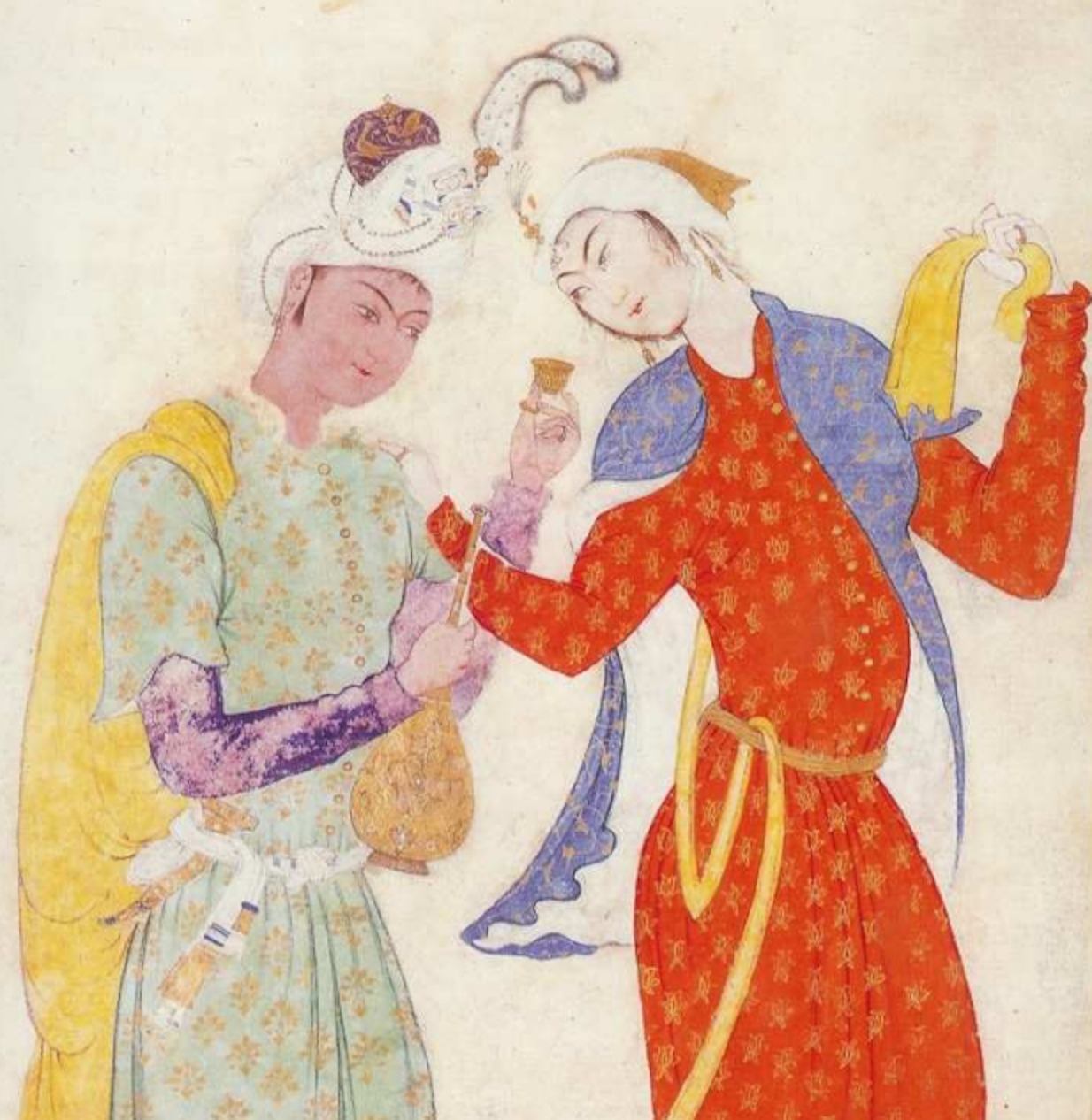
The Princely Lovers, a likely depiction of an affair between Bahram Beyg and Princess Soltanum, daughter of Shah Ismail. Attributable to Mirza Ali, Qazvin, circa 1544.

Jean Chardin, the 17th-century French traveler, spent many years in Iran and commented at length on their culture, customs and character. He admired their consideration towards foreigners, but he also stumbled upon characteristics that he found challenging. His descriptions of the public appearance, clothes and customs are corroborated by the miniatures, drawings and paintings from that time which have survived. He considered them to be a well-educated and well-behaved people.

Unlike Europeans, they much disliked physical activity, and were not in favor of exercise for its own sake, preferring the leisure of repose and luxuries that life could offer. Travelling was valued only for the specific purpose of getting from one place to another, not interesting themselves in seeing new places and experiencing different cultures. It was perhaps this sort of attitude towards the rest of the world that accounted for the ignorance of Persians regarding other countries of the world. The exercises that they took part in were for keeping the body supple and sturdy and to acquire skills in handling of arms. Archery took first place. Second place was held by fencing, where the wrist had to be firm but flexible and movements agile. Thirdly there was horsemanship. A very strenuous form of exercise which the Persians greatly enjoyed was hunting.

=== Art ===
Abbas I recognized the commercial benefit of promoting the arts – artisan products provided much of Iran's foreign trade. In this period, handicrafts such as tile making, pottery and textiles developed and great advances were made in miniature painting, bookbinding, decoration and calligraphy. In the 16th century, carpet weaving evolved from a nomadic and peasant craft to a well-executed industry with specialization of design and manufacturing. Tabriz was the center of this industry. The carpets of Ardabil were commissioned to commemorate the Safavid dynasty. The elegantly baroque yet famously Polonaise carpets were made in Iran during the 17th century.

Using traditional forms and materials, Reza Abbasi (1565–1635) introduced new subjects to Persian painting – semi-nude women, youth, lovers. His painting and calligraphic style influenced Iranian artists for much of the Safavid period, which came to be known as the Isfahan school. The epic Shahnameh ("Book of Kings"), a stellar example of manuscript illumination and calligraphy, was made during Shah Tahmasp's reign. Another manuscript is the Khamsa by Nizami executed 1539–1543 by Agha Mirak and his school in Isfahan. During the time of the Safavids in the 17th century, there would begin a shift towards more European-influenced art (farangi-sazi), boosting inspiration to Iranian artists who adopted modeling, foreshortening, spatial recession, and the medium of oil painting (Shah Abbas II sent Mohammad Zaman to study in Rome).

==== Architecture ====
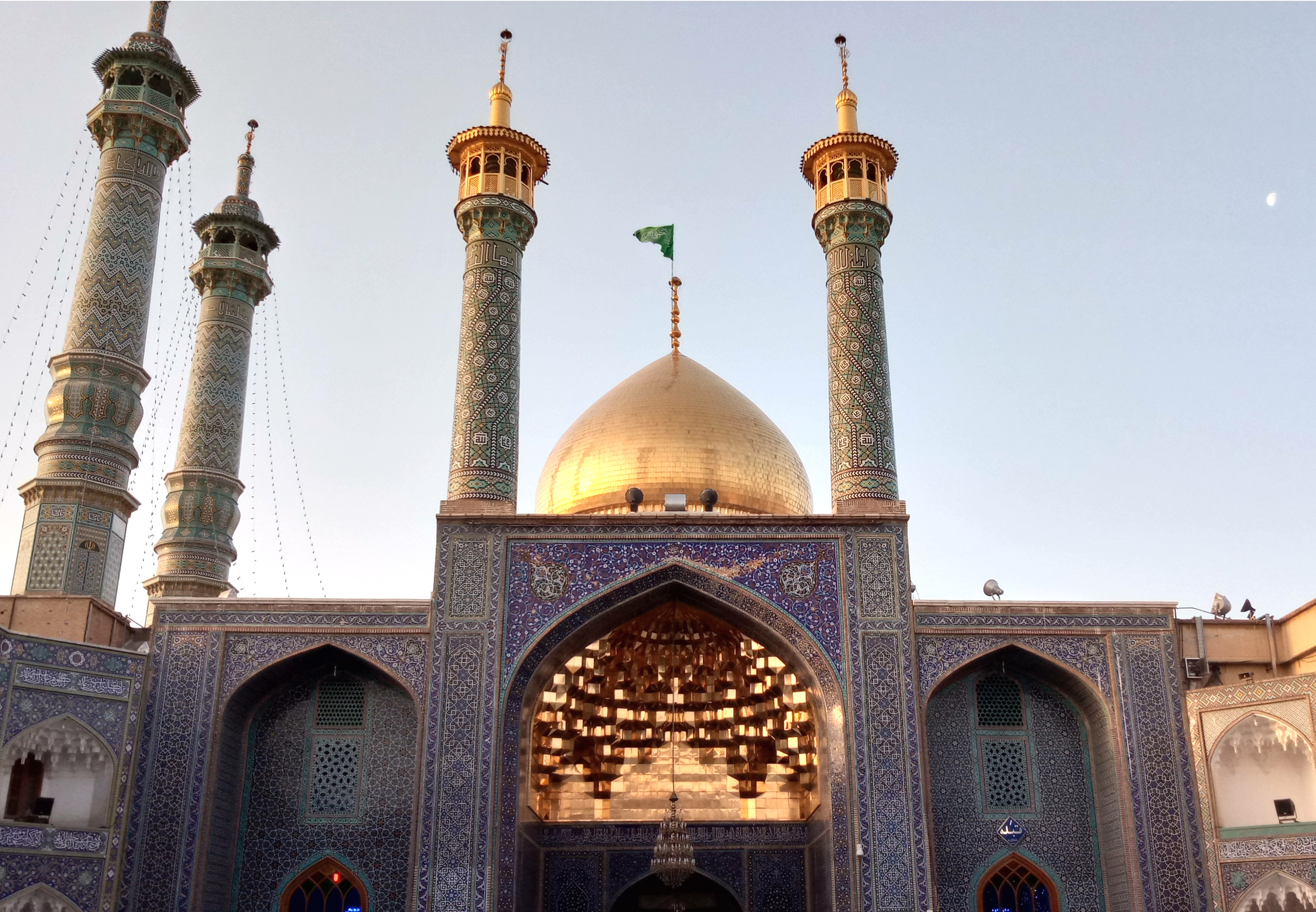
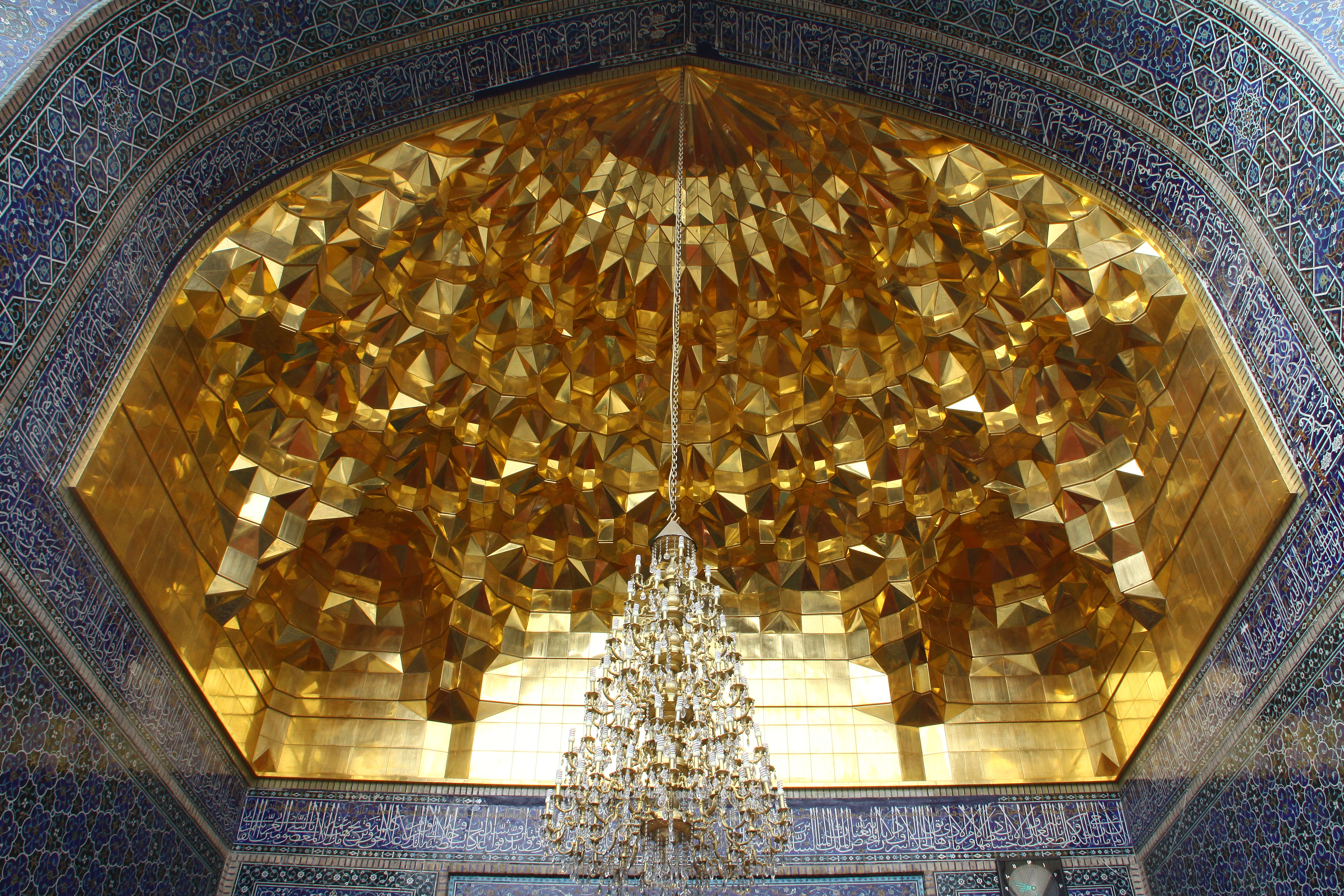
The Golden Iwan (with its muqarnas golden ceiling) and Golden Dome, commissioned ca. 1519 by Tajlu Khanum, at the Shrine of Fatima al-Masuma, Qom.

Tajlu Khanum, the Queen of Shah Ismail, financed the Fatima Masumeh Shrine in Qom in 1519, commissioning the Golden Iwan (with its muqarnas golden ceiling) and rebuilding the Golden Dome. She dedicated the Golden Iwan to Shah Ismail with an inscription in light blue mosaic over the pinnacle of the arch, which gives Shah Ismail's name and laudatory attributes such as "the upholder of justice", "the guardian of the empire" and even "the Guide (Mahdi)", a title normally reserved to God and the twelfth Shi'i imam.

She also built her husband Shah Ismail's tomb in Ardabil after his death in 1524, right next to the tomb of the Safavid ancestor Shayk Safi. She then supported Tahmasp Mirza's elevation to throne in 1524.

===== New capital of Isfahan (1598) =====
Isfahan bears the most prominent samples of the Safavid architecture, all constructed in the years after Shah Abbas I permanently moved the capital there in 1598: the Imperial Mosque, Masjid-e Shah, completed in 1630, the Imam Mosque (Masjid-e Imami) the Lutfallah Mosque and the Royal Palace.

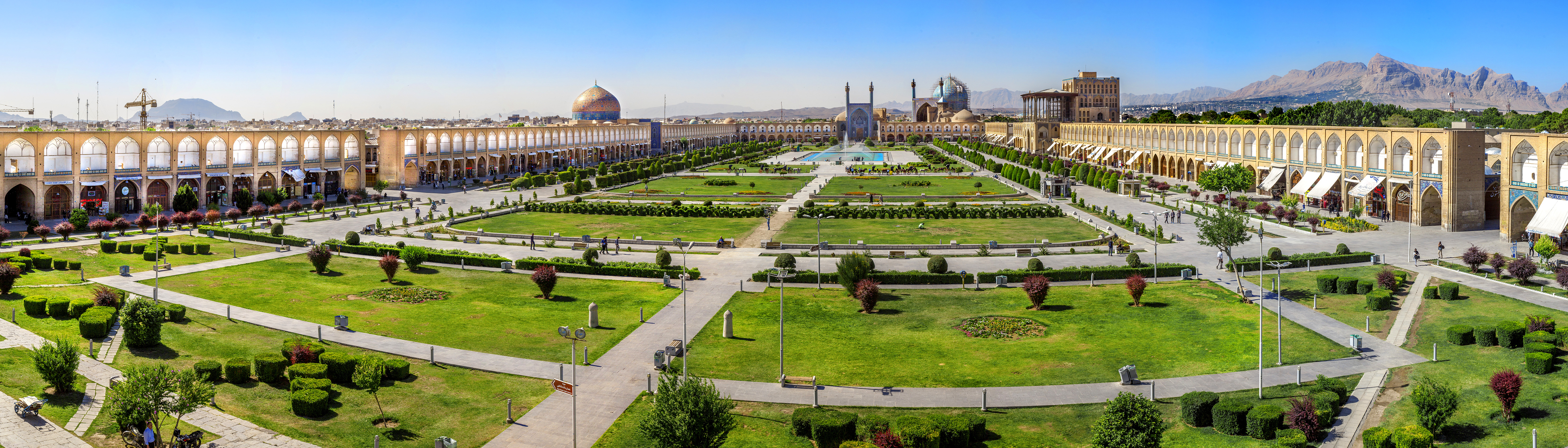
Naqshe Jahan square in Isfahan is the epitome of 17th-century Iranian architecture.

According to William Cleveland and Martin Bunton, the establishment of Isfahan as the Great capital of Iran and the material splendor of the city attracted intellectual's from all corners of the world, which contributed to the city's rich cultural life. The impressive achievements of its 400,000 residents prompted the inhabitants to coin their famous boast, "Isfahan is half the world".

A new age in Iranian architecture began with the rise of the Safavid dynasty. Economically robust and politically stable, this period saw a flourishing growth of theological sciences. Traditional architecture evolved in its patterns and methods leaving its impact on the architecture of the following periods.

Indeed, one of the greatest legacies of the Safavids is the architecture. In 1598, when Shah Abbas decided to move the capital of his Iranian empire from the north-western city of Qazvin to the central city of Isfahan, he initiated what would become one of the greatest programmes in Iranian history; the complete remaking of the city. By choosing the central city of Isfahan, fertilized by the Zāyande roud ("The life-giving river"), lying as an oasis of intense cultivation in the midst of a vast area of arid landscape, he both distanced his capital from any future assaults by the Ottomans and the Uzbeks, and at the same time gained more control over the Persian Gulf, which had recently become an important trading route for the Dutch and English.

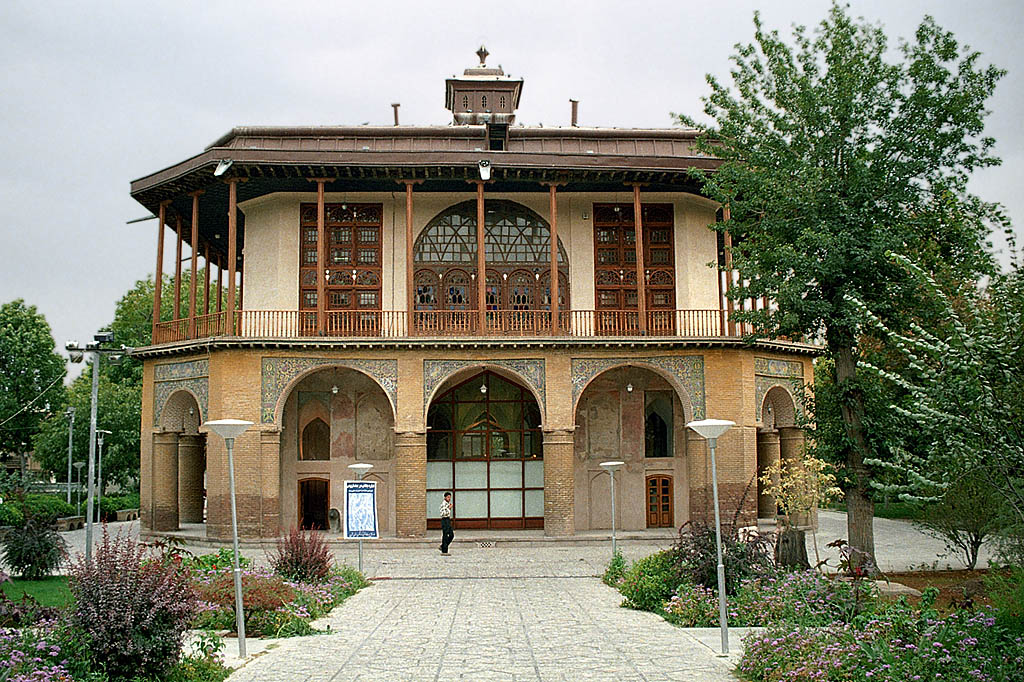
The 16th-century Chehel Sotun pavilion in Qazvin, Iran. It is the last remains of the palace of the second Safavid king, Shah Tahmasp; it was heavily restored by the Qajars in the 19th century.

The chief architect of this colossal task of urban planning was Shaykh Bahai (Baha ad-Din al-Amili), who focused the programme on two key features of Shah Abbas's master plan: the Chahar Bagh avenue, flanked at either side by all the prominent institutions of the city, such as the residences of all foreign dignitaries. And the Naqsh-e Jahan Square ("Examplar of the World"). Prior to the shah's ascent to power, Iran had a decentralized power-structure, in which different institutions battled for power, including both the military (the Qizilbash) and governors of the different provinces making up the empire. Shah Abbas wanted to undermine this political structure, and the recreation of Isfahan, as a Grand capital of Iran, was an important step in centralizing the power. The ingenuity of the square, or Maidān, was that, by building it, Shah Abbas would gather the three main components of power in Iran in his own backyard; the power of the clergy, represented by the Masjed-e Shah, the power of the merchants, represented by the Grand Bazaar, and of course, the power of the shah himself, residing in the Ali Qapu Palace.

Distinctive monuments like the Sheikh Lotfallah (1618), Hasht Behesht (Eight Paradise Palace) (1469) and the Chaharbagh School (1714) appeared in Isfahan and other cities. This extensive development of architecture was rooted in Persian culture and took form in the design of schools, baths, houses, caravanserai and other urban spaces such as bazaars and squares. It continued until the end of the Qajar reign.

==== Literature ====
In Safavid Iran, poetry and other forms of writing were encouraged and produced throughout all parts of society. The Safavids' new religious customs, governmental structures, and official ideology all influenced the making of literature, yet none of these things stopped or restricted it. There was a distinct rethinking, adaptation, rewriting, and mixing of the formal and thematic rules of the preceding five centuries of Persian poetry during the Safavid period, even though these changes were not drastical. An example is the Jannat-e Adn ("Garden of Eden") by Abdi Beg Shirazi, one of the longest panegyric Persian poems. A khamsa is normally a set of five narrative poems, each in a specific meter, a style created by the 12th-century Persian poet Nizami Ganjavi. However, unlike typical khamsas where each poem has a different story, all five poems in the Janat-e Adn revolve around the same theme.

After Shah Abbas I chose Isfahan as the capital, the city became a hub of literary activity, attracting poets with varying levels of affiliation to the court. Shah Abbas I appears in a number of stories by biographers in which he directly engaged with local poets in the streets, coffee shops, and at court. Some poets did depart Iran because they believed their abilities had been overlooked or because they were afraid of Abbas I's infamous anger. The history of Persian literature, however, has many stories of poets falling out with their patrons.

=== The Isfahan School – Islamic philosophy revived ===
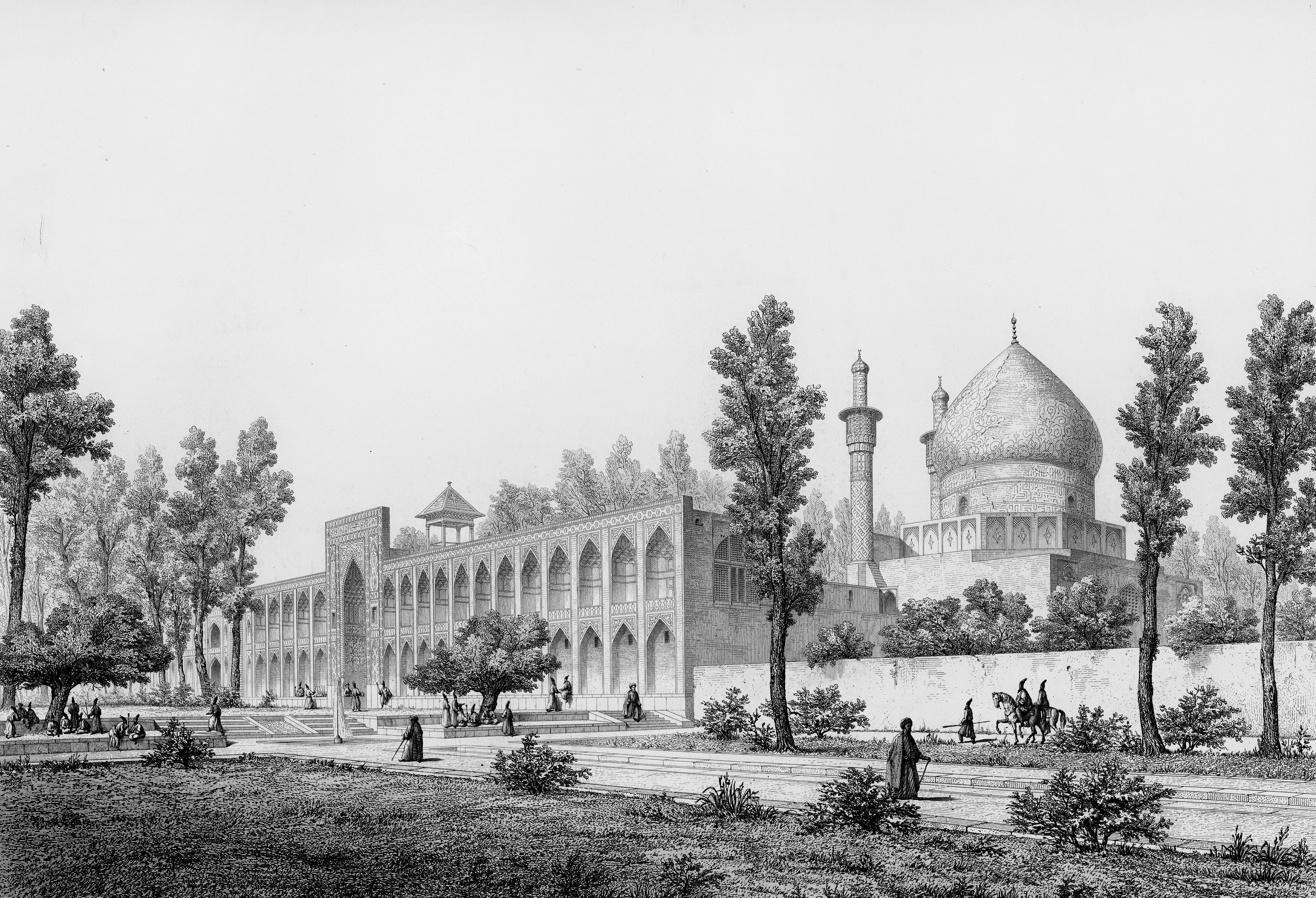
19th-century painting of the Chahar Bagh School in Isfahan, built during the time of Soltan Hossein to serve as a theological and clerical school

Islamic philosophy flourished in the Safavid era in what scholars commonly refer to the School of Isfahan. Mir Damad is considered the founder of this school. Among luminaries of this school of philosophy, the names of Iranian philosophers such as Mir Damad, Mir Fendereski, Shaykh Bahai and Mohsen Fayz Kashani standout. The school reached its apogee with that of the Iranian philosopher Mulla Sadra who is arguably the most significant Islamic philosopher after Avicenna. Mulla Sadra has become the dominant philosopher of the Islamic East, and his approach to the nature of philosophy has been exceptionally influential up to this day. He wrote the Al-Hikma al-muta‘aliya fi-l-asfar al-'aqliyya al-arba‘a ("The Transcendent Philosophy of the Four Journeys of the Intellect"), a meditation on what he called meta philosophy which brought to a synthesis the philosophical mysticism of Sufism, the theology of Shia Islam, and the Peripatetic and Illuminationist philosophies of Avicenna and Suhrawardi.

According to the Iranologist Richard Nelson Frye:

They were the continuers of the classical tradition of Islamic thought, which after Averroes died in the Arab west. The Persians schools of thought were the true heirs of the great Islamic thinkers of the Islamic Golden Age, whereas in the Ottoman empire there was an intellectual stagnation, as far as the traditions of Islamic philosophy were concerned.

=== Medicine ===
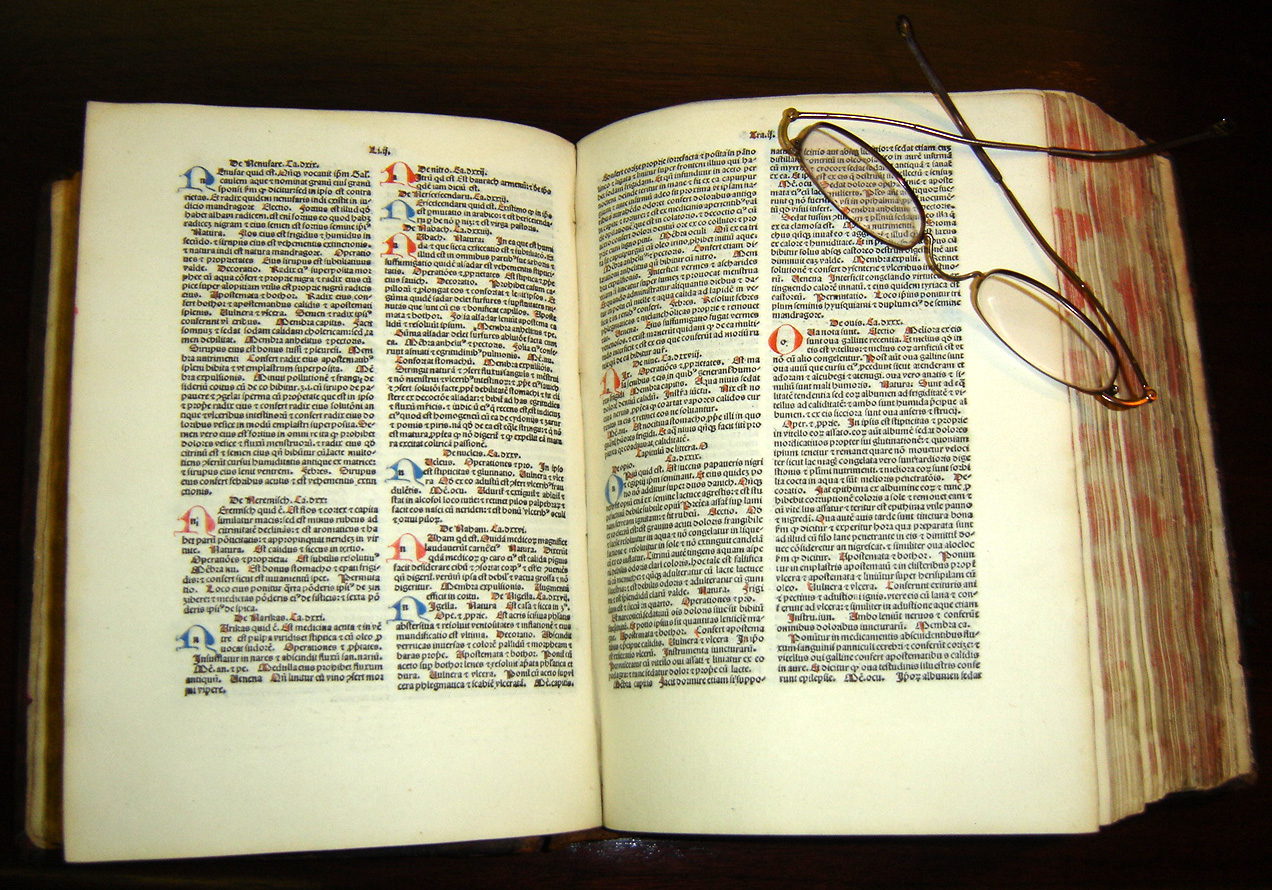
A Latin copy of The Canon of Medicine, dated 1484, located at the P.I. Nixon Medical Historical Library of The University of Texas Health Science Center at San Antonio, US

The status of physicians during the Safavids stood as high as ever. Whereas neither the ancient Greeks nor the Romans accorded high social status to their doctors, Iranians had from ancient times honored their physicians, who were often appointed counselors of the shahs. This would not change with the Arab conquest of Iran, and it was primarily the Persians that took upon them the works of philosophy, logic, medicine, mathematics, astronomy, astrology, music and alchemy.

By the sixteenth century, Islamic science, which to a large extent meant Persian science, was resting on its laurels. The works of al-Razi (865–892) (known to the West as Razes) were still used in European universities as standard textbooks of alchemy, pharmacology and pediatrics. The Canon of Medicine by Avicenna (c. 980 – 1037) was still regarded as one of the primary textbooks in medicine throughout most of the civilized world. As such, the status of medicine in the Safavid period did not change much, and relied as much on these works as ever before. Physiology was still based on the four humours of ancient and mediaeval medicine, and bleeding and purging were still the principal forms of therapy by surgeons, something even Thevenot experienced during his visit to Iran.

The only field within medicine where some progress were made was pharmacology, with the compilement of the "Tibb-e Shifa’i" in 1556. This book was translated into French in 1681 by Angulus de Saint, under the name "Pharmacopoea Persica".

=== Entertainment ===
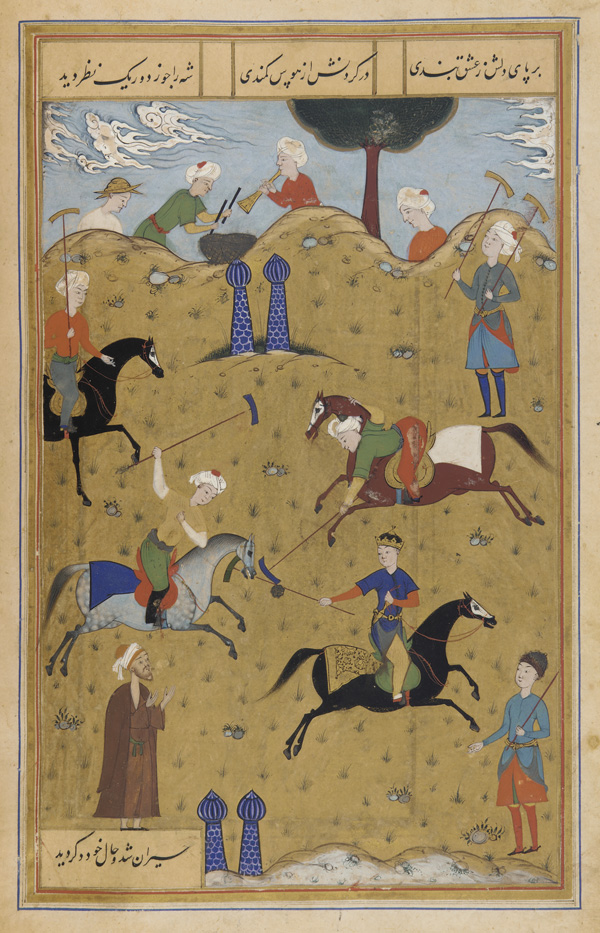
A persian miniature depicting a polo-match

Since pre-Islamic times, the sport of wrestling had been an integral part of the Iranian identity, and the professional wrestlers, who performed in Zurkhanehs, were considered important members of the society. Each town had their own troop of wrestlers, called Pahlavans. Their sport also provided the masses with entertainment and spectacle. Chardin described one such event:

The two wrestlers were covered in grease. They are present on the level ground, and a small drum is always playing during the contest for excitement. They swear to a good fight and shake hands. That done, they slap their thighs, buttocks and hips to the rhythm of the drum. That is for the women and to get themselves in good form. After that they join together in uttering a great cry and trying to overthrow each other.

As well as wrestling, what gathered the masses was fencing, tightrope dancers, puppet-players and acrobats, performing in large squares, such as the Royal square. A leisurely form of amusement was to be found in the cabarets, particularly in certain districts, like those near the mausoleum of Harun-e Velayat. People met there to drink liqueurs or coffee, to smoke tobacco or opium, and to chat or listen to poetry.

=== Clothes and appearances ===
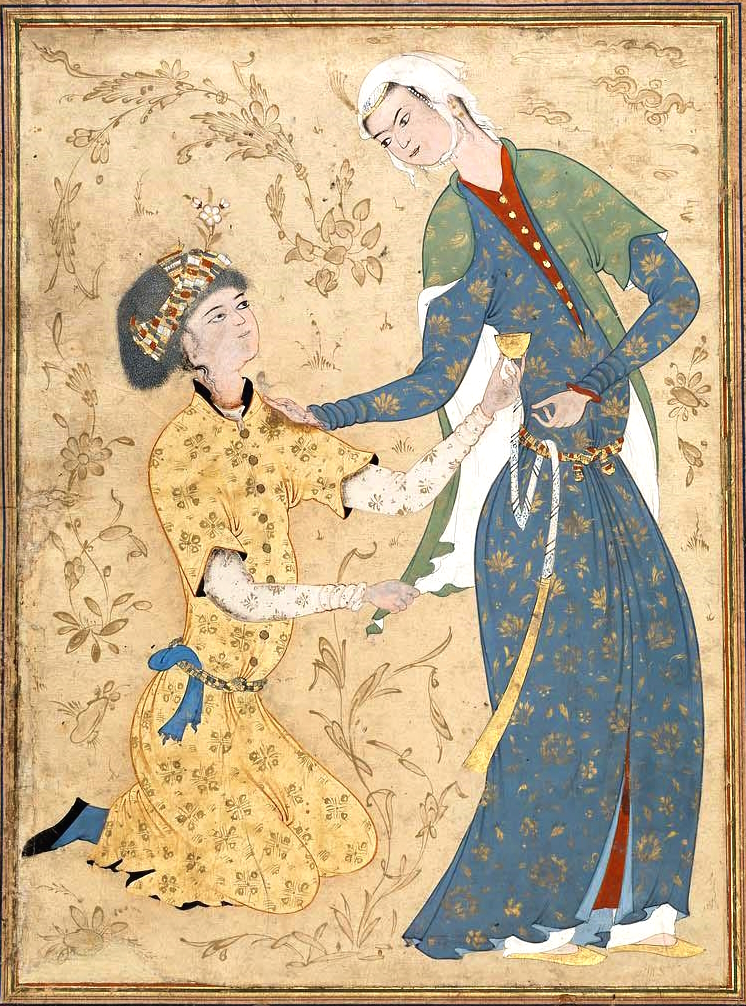
A young man offering a cup of wine to a girl. Safavid period, 16th century.

As noted before, a key aspect of the Persian character was its love of luxury, particularly on keeping up appearances. They would adorn their clothes, wearing stones and decorate the harness of their horses. Men wore many rings on their fingers, almost as many as their wives. They also placed jewels on their arms, such as on daggers and swords. Daggers were worn at the waist. In describing the lady's clothing, he noted that Persian dress revealed more of the figure than did the European, but that women appeared differently depending on whether they were at home in the presence of friends and family, or if they were in the public. In private they usually wore a veil that only covered the hair and the back, but upon leaving the home, they put on manteaus, large cloaks that concealed their whole bodies except their faces. They often dyed their feet and hands with henna. Their hairstyle was simple, the hair gathered back in tresses, often adorned at the ends with pearls and clusters of jewels. Women with slender waists were regarded as more attractive than those with larger figures. Women from the provinces and slaves pierced their left nostrils with rings, but well-born Persian women would not do this.

The most precious accessory for men was the turban. Although they lasted a long time it was necessary to have changes for different occasions like weddings and the Nowruz, while men of status never wore the same turban two days running. Clothes that became soiled in any way were changed immediately.

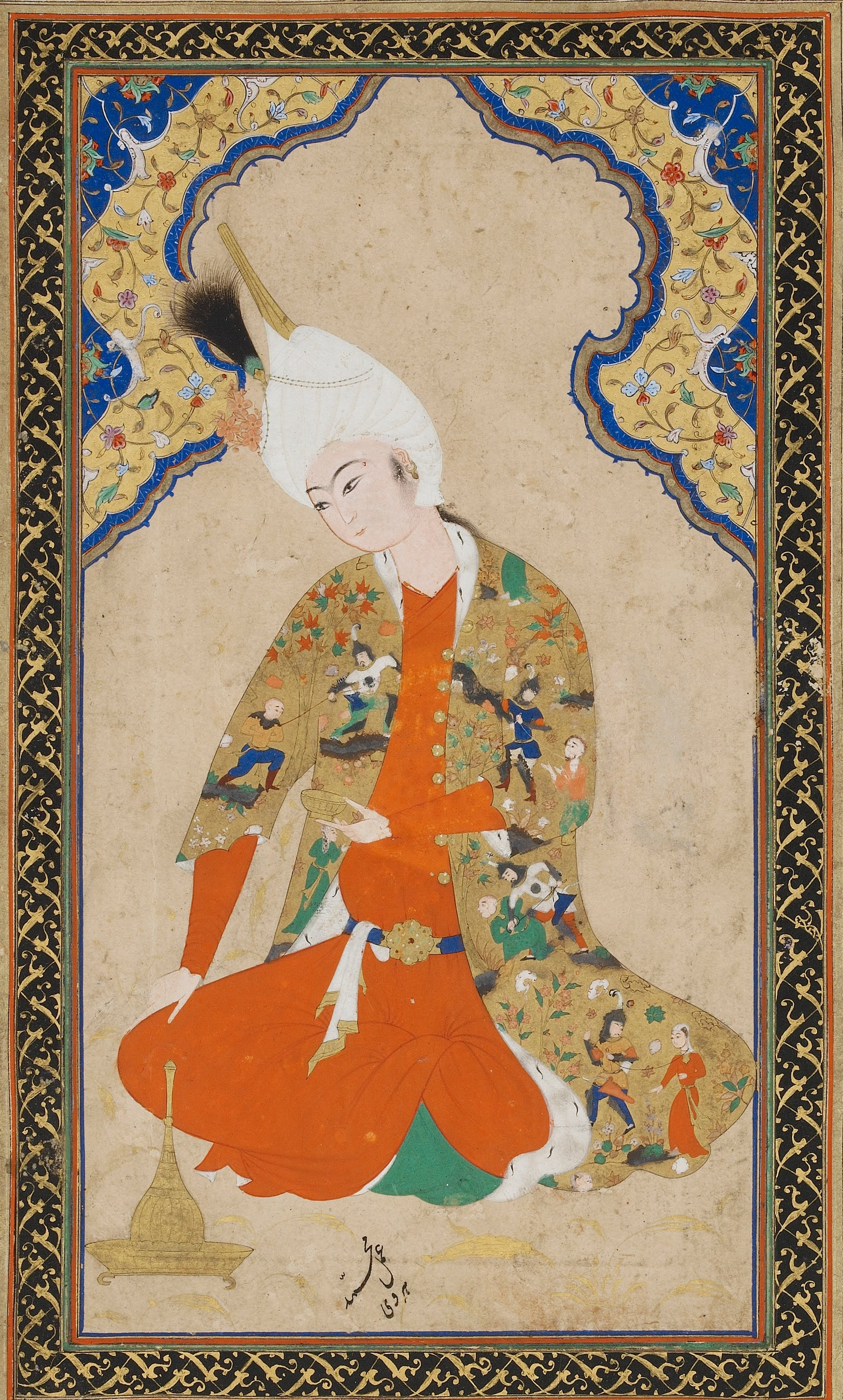
Young prince, wearing a coat with scenes of warriors taking prisoners. Court of Shah Tahmasp, c. 1550

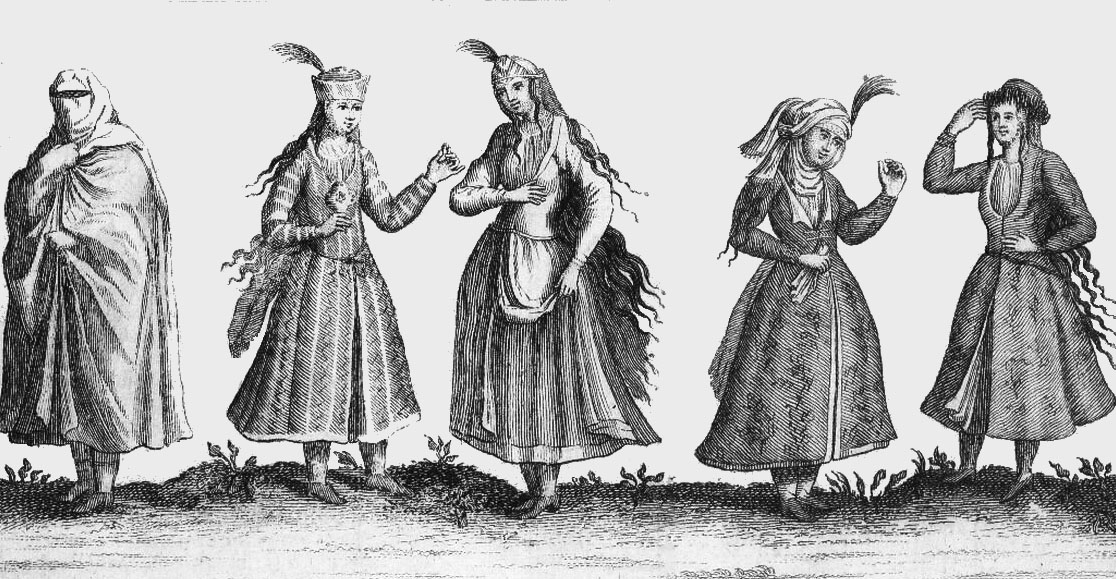
Ladies' clothing in the 1666, by Jean Chardin

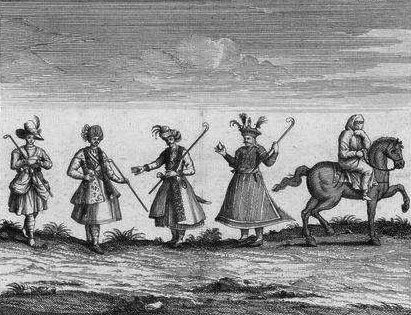
Men's clothing in the 1666, by Jean Chardin

== Language ==
The Safavids by the time of their rise spoke Persian, and a southern Turkic dialect, which is often called Ajami Turkic and seen as a precursor to the Azerbaijani Turkic language, which the Safavids acquired after moving from Iranian Kurdistan to Ardabil. The language chiefly used by the Safavid court, as well as military establishment was Turkic, and according to Zabiollah Safa, religious dignitaries also often used Turkic, due to their military and grandees consisting mostly of the Turkic-speaking qizilbash, who the Safavids used to bring themselves to power during the early stages of Safavid Iran, but would later be mostly replaced by Armenian, Georgian and Circassian gholams. Armenian, Georgian and Circassian also were languages used by the Safavid court and are said to have been known by some of the rulers. Blow writes that these were the mother tongues of many of the ghulams and women in the harem, and Figueroa heard Shah Abbas speak Georgian, which he had learned from his ghulams and concubines.

But the official language of the empire, as well as the administrative language, language of correspondence, literature, and historiography was Persian. The inscriptions on Safavid currency were in Persian and Persian was also used in the court, especially since Isfahan became the capital. The Safavids also used Persian as a cultural and administrative language throughout the empire and were native Persian speakers. Especially in urban areas, Safavid literature and Persian poetry connected the past, including the pre-Islamic past, to the present and functioned as a body of shared cultural traditions for both the common people and the elite. The legendary pre-Islamic Iranian past, with kings battling eternal forces of evil in Iran's national epic, the Shahnameh, was connected to the Islamic Safavid present, which had its own strong symbols of righteousness and redemption. According to Rula Jurdi Abisaab, hadith complications and doctrinal works were translated to Persian under the Safavids, though Arabic was still used for religious scholarship. The 'Amili operated through Court-based religious posts and as such had to master Persian, with their students translating their instructions into Persian. Adisaab attributes mainstream Shia Islam's popularization to this Persianization. According to Arnold J. Toynbee, "In the heyday of the Safawi, Mughal, and Ottoman regimes New Persian was being patronized as the language of literae humaniores by the ruling element over the whole of this huge realm, while it was also being employed as the official language of administration in those two-thirds of its realm that lay within the Safawi and the Mughal frontiers".

According to John R. Perry, it was in the 16th century that the Safavid family, likely being Turkicized Iranian or possibly Kurdish in origin, established Turkic as the language of the court and the military in their conquest. It was "a high-status vernacular and a widespread contact language" which influenced spoken Persian, though written Persian in high literature and civil administration was virtually untouched. É. Á. Csató et al recounts Europeans attesting what they called "Persian Turkish" ("Turc Agemi", "lingua turcica agemica") during the 16th and 17th centuries, a Turkic language originally called "turki". It was popular at the court and in the army, and it was likely also spoken in the Caucasus and Transcaucasia, which were under Ottoman and Safavid control without being fully integrated into Safavid Iran until 1606. The language could be identified as Middle Azerbaijanian, but its linguistic and territorial range are unclear. What was certain is that it was not homogenous, possibly being an Azerbaijanian-Ottoman mixed language. Scholars identify the Ajami Turkic of the court as a qizilbash dialect. According to David Blow, it was most likely the mother tongue of Abbas I, but he was fluent in Persian as well, and "most, if not all, of the Turkoman grandees at the court also spoke Persian". However, most Persians did not know Turkish, and Abbas had to translate a Turkish conversation with Pietro Della Valle into Persian afterwards for most of those present. Stephen Dale also states that Ismail's dialect never became a state language, and that Iranian Turkic largely remained a tribal/Qizilbash and provincial Azerbaijanian phenomenon, subordinate to Persian as the language of formal education and the dominant literary culture. According to Willem Floor and Hasan Javadi, Qizilbash Turkish was spoken both at the court and by commoners, though Persian and European authors rarely mentioned the language of common communication. The poet and miniaturist Sadeqi Afshar (1533–1610), who spoke Chaghatay despite being born in Tabriz, "was the first to refer to speakers of Qizilbashi (motakallemin-e Qizilbash), but he, and one century later 'Abdol-Jamil Nasiri, were the exception to this general rule of calling the language 'Turki'."

== Legacy ==
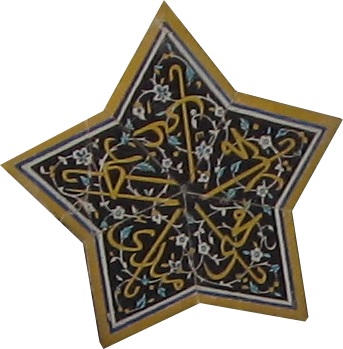
Safavid Star from ceiling of Shah Mosque, Isfahan, Iran

It was the Safavids who made Iran the spiritual bastion of Shiʻism, and the repository of Persian cultural traditions and self-awareness of Iranianhood, acting as a bridge to modern Iran. The founder of the dynasty, Shah Isma'il, adopted the title of "King of Iran" (Pādišah-ī Īrān), with its implicit notion of an Iranian state stretching from Khorasan as far as Euphrates, and from the Oxus to the southern Territories of the Persian Gulf. According to Professor Roger Savory:

In a number of ways the Safavids affected the development of the modern Iranian state: first, they ensured the continuance of various ancient and traditional Persian institutions, and transmitted these in a strengthened, or more 'national', form; second, by imposing Ithna 'Ashari Shi'a Islam on Iran as the official religion of the Safavid state, they enhanced the power of mujtahids. The Safavids thus set in train a struggle for power between the turban and the crown that is to say, between the proponents of secular government and the proponents of a theocratic government; third, they laid the foundation of alliance between the religious classes ('Ulama') and the bazaar which played an important role both in the Persian Constitutional Revolution of 1905–1906, and again in the Islamic Revolution of 1979; fourth the policies introduced by Shah Abbas I conduced to a more centralized administrative system. (Note: Mujtahid: A mujtahid in Arabic means a person who qualified to engage in ijtihad, or interpretation of religious texts. Ithna 'ashari is the number twelve in Arabic, signifying Twelver Imami Shiʻi Islam. Ulama: Arabic for religious scholars.)

According to Donald Struesand, "although the Safavid unification of the eastern and western halves of the Iranian plateau and imposition of Twelver Shiʻi Islam on the region created a recognizable precursor of modern Iran, the Safavid polity itself was neither distinctively Iranian nor national." Rudolph Matthee concluded that "though not a nation-state, Safavid Iran contained the elements that would later spawn one by generating many enduring bureaucratic features and by initiating a polity of overlapping religious and territorial boundaries."

The Reformation in northern and central Europe and the Counter-Reformation that followed it are comparable to the state-sponsored Shia Islam that resulted from the advent of the Safavids and the Sunni response to it. The split that resulted between the Sunnis and Shias is similar to the Protestant-Catholic split that accelerated the formation of nation-states in Europe. The emergence of the Safavid state and its adoption of Shia Islam as the official faith was a pivotal moment that significantly affected both Iran and the surrounding Sunni-majority regions. The conversion to a state-sponsored religion, in this case Shia Islam, provided the bond required to hold together the fundamental elements of Safavid state, similar to other early states such as Spain and England. Iran was largely shaped into a geographical empire with a unique identity due to the fusion of religious and political elements by the Safavid dynasty.

== See also ==
- Persianate states
- List of Shia Muslim dynasties
- Safavid conversion of Iran to Shia Islam
- Khanates of the Caucasus

== Bibliography ==
=== Encyclopaedia Iranica ===
- Algar, Hamid (2006). "Iran ix. Religions in Iran (2) Islam in Iran (2.3) Shiʿism in Iran Since the Safavids". In Yarshater, Ehsan (ed.). Encyclopædia Iranica (Online ed.). Encyclopædia Iranica Foundation.
- Ashraf, Ahmad (2016) [2006]. "Iranian identity iii. Medieval Islamic period". In Yarshater, Ehsan (ed.). Encyclopædia Iranica (Online ed.). Encyclopædia Iranica Foundation.
- Bosworth, Clifford Edmund (2013) [1988]. "Barda and Barda-Dāri v. Military slavery in Islamic Iran". In Yarshater, Ehsan (ed.). Encyclopædia Iranica (Online ed.). Encyclopædia Iranica Foundation.
- Ghereghlou, Kioumars (2016). "Ḥaydar Ṣafavi". In Yarshater, Ehsan (ed.). Encyclopædia Iranica (Online ed.). Encyclopædia Iranica Foundation.
- Hassanpour, Amir (2013) [1995]. "Dimdim". In Yarshater, Ehsan (ed.). Encyclopædia Iranica (Online ed.). Encyclopædia Iranica Foundation.
- Manz, Beatrice Forbes; Haneda, Masashi (2016) [1990]. "Čarkas". In Yarshater, Ehsan (ed.). Encyclopædia Iranica (Online ed.). Encyclopædia Iranica Foundation.
- Matthee, Rudolph P. (2013) [2001]. "Georgia vii. Georgians in the Safavid Administration". In Yarshater, Ehsan (ed.). Encyclopædia Iranica (Online ed.). Encyclopædia Iranica Foundation.
- Matthee, Rudolph P. (2017) [2008]. "Safavid Dynasty". In Yarshater, Ehsan (ed.). Encyclopædia Iranica (Online ed.). Encyclopædia Iranica Foundation.
- Mitchell, Colin P. (2012) [2009]. "Ṭahmāsp I". In Yarshater, Ehsan (ed.). Encyclopædia Iranica (Online ed.). Encyclopædia Iranica Foundation.
- Perry, John R. (2006). "Turkic-Iranian Contacts i. Linguistic Contacts". In Yarshater, Ehsan (ed.). Encyclopædia Iranica (Online ed.). Encyclopædia Iranica Foundation.
- Rogers, John Michael (2013) [1991]. "Chinese-Iranian Relations iv. The Safavid Period, 1501-1732". In Yarshater, Ehsan (ed.). Encyclopædia Iranica (Online ed.). Encyclopædia Iranica Foundation.
- Savory, Roger M. (2013) [1997]. "Ebn Bazzāz". In Yarshater, Ehsan (ed.). Encyclopædia Iranica (Online ed.). Encyclopædia Iranica Foundation.
- Savory, Roger M. (2017) [1985]. "Allāhverdī Khan (1)". In Yarshater, Ehsan (ed.). Encyclopædia Iranica (Online ed.). Encyclopædia Iranica Foundation.
- Savory, Roger M. (2018) [1982]. "Abbās I". In Yarshater, Ehsan (ed.). Encyclopædia Iranica (Online ed.). Encyclopædia Iranica Foundation.
- Savory, Roger M.; Karamustafa, Ahmet T. (2017) [1998]. "Esmāʿīl I Ṣafawī". In Yarshater, Ehsan (ed.). Encyclopædia Iranica (Online ed.). Encyclopædia Iranica Foundation.
- Tucker, Ernest (2015) [2006]. "Nāder Shah". In Yarshater, Ehsan (ed.). Encyclopædia Iranica (Online ed.). Encyclopædia Iranica Foundation.
- Yarshater, Ehsan (2004). "Iran ii. Iranian History (2) Islamic period (page 4)". In Yarshater, Ehsan (ed.). Encyclopædia Iranica (Online ed.). Encyclopædia Iranica Foundation.
- Yarshater, Ehsan (2016) [1988]. "Azerbaijan vii. The Iranian Language of Azerbaijan". In Yarshater, Ehsan (ed.). Encyclopædia Iranica (Online ed.). Encyclopædia Iranica Foundation.

=== Encyclopaedia of Islam ===
- Minorsky, Vladimir Fyodorovich (1960). "Āḏẖarbayḏj̱ān (Azarbāyḏj̱ān)". In Gibb, H. A. R.; Kramers, J. H.; Lévi-Provençal, E.; Schacht, J.; Lewis, B. & Pellat, Ch. (eds.). The Encyclopaedia of Islam, Second Edition. Volume I: A–B. Leiden: E. J. Brill. OCLC 495469456.

=== Books ===
- Amanat, Abbas (1997). Pivot of the Universe: Nasir Al-Din Shah Qajar and the Iranian Monarchy, 1831–1896. I.B. Tauris. ISBN 978-1845118280. Archived from the original on 2024-09-19.
- Amanat, Abbas (2017). Iran: A Modern History. Yale University Press. ISBN 978-0-300-11254-2.
- Amanat, Abbas (2019). "Remembering the Persianate". In Amanat, Abbas; Ashraf, Assef (eds.). The Persianate World: Rethinking a Shared Sphere. Brill. ISBN 978-90-04-38728-7.
- Amoretti, B. Scarcia; Matthee, Rudolph P. (2009). "Ṣafavid Dynasty". In Esposito, J. L. (ed.). The Oxford Encyclopedia of the Islamic World. Oxford University Press. ISBN 9780195305135.
- Asat'iani, Nodar; Bendianachvili, Alexandre (1997). Histoire de la Géorgie [History of Georgia] (in French). Paris, France: L'Harmattan. ISBN 2-7384-6186-7. LCCN 98159624.
- Ashraf, Assef (2024). Making and Remaking Empire in Early Qajar Iran. Cambridge University Press. ISBN 978-1009361552. Archived from the original on 2024-09-16.
- Axworthy, Michael (2010). The Sword of Persia: Nader Shah, from Tribal Warrior to Conquering Tyrant. I.B. Tauris. ISBN 978-0857721938.
- Blow, David (2009). Shah Abbas: The Ruthless King Who Became an Iranian Legend. I.B. Tauris. ISBN 978-0857716767. Archived from the original on 2025-11-04.
- Bournoutian, George A. (2003). A Concise History of the Armenian People: (from Ancient Times to the Present) (2nd ed.). Mazda Publishers. ISBN 9781568591414.
- Bowering, Gerhard; Crone, Patricia; Kadi, Wadad; Stewart, Devin J.; Zaman, Muhammad Qasim; Mirza, Mahan, eds. (2013). "Introduction". The Princeton Encyclopedia of Islamic Thought. Princeton University Press. ISBN 978-0-691-13484-0.
- Bryer, Anthony (1975). Greeks and Türkmens: The Pontic Exception. Vol. 29. Dumbarton Oaks Papers. pp. 113–148. doi:10.2307/1291371. JSTOR 1291371.
- Canby, Sheila R. (2009). Shah ʻAbbas: the Remaking of Iran. London: British Museum Press. ISBN 978-0-7141-2456-8.
- Ferrier, Ronald W., ed. (1989). The Arts of Persia. Yale University Press. ISBN 0300039875.
- Ferrier, Ronald W., ed. (1996). A Journey to Persia: Jean Chardin's Portrait of a Seventeenth-century Empire. I.B. Tauris & C0. ISBN 1850435642.
- Floor, Willem; Javadi, Hasan (2013). "The Role of Azerbaijani Turkish in Safavid Iran". Iranian Studies. 46 (4): 569–581. doi:10.1080/00210862.2013.784516. JSTOR 24482868. S2CID 161700244.
- Gelvin, James L. (2005). "Biographical Sketches". The Modern Middle East: A History. Oxford University Press. ISBN 978-0-19-021886-7.
- Glassé, Cyril (2001) [1989]. Drake, Nicholas; Davis, Elizabeth (eds.). The New Encyclopedia of Islam (revised ed.). Walnut Creek CA: AltaMira Press. ISBN 0759101892.
- Khanbaghi, Aptin (2006). The Fire, the Star and the Cross: Minority Religions in Medieval and Early Modern Iran. I.B. Tauris. ISBN 978-1845110567.
- Kia, Mana (2014). "Imagining Iran before Nationalism: Geocultural Meanings of Land in Azar's Atashkadeh". In Aghaie, Kamran Scot; Marashi, Afshin (eds.). Rethinking Iranian Nationalism and Modernity. University of Texas Press. pp. 89–112.
- Lapidus, Ira M. (2012). "The Safavid Empire". Islamic Societies to the Nineteenth Century: A Global History. Cambridge University Press. ISBN 978-0-521-51441-5.
- Lockhart, Laurence; Jackson, Peter, eds. (1986). The Cambridge History of Iran: The Timurid and Safavid Periods. Vol. 6. Cambridge: Cambridge University Press. ISBN 0-521-20094-6.
- Losensky, Paul (2021). "Not All of the Poets Went to India: Literary Culture in Iran under Safavid Rule". In Matthee, Rudi (ed.). The Safavid World. Routledge.
- Manz, Beatrice F. (2021). Nomads in the Middle East. Cambridge University Press. ISBN 9781139028813.
- Matthee, Rudolph P. (1999). The Politics of Trade in Safavid Iran: Silk for Silver, 1600–1730. Cambridge University Press. ISBN 978-0-521-64131-9.
- Matthee, Rudolph P. (2005). The Pursuit of Pleasure: Drugs and Stimulants in Iranian History, 1500-1900. Princeton University Press. ISBN 9780691144443.
- Matthee, Rudolph P. (2009). "Was Safavid Iran an Empire?". Journal of the Economic and Social History of the Orient. 53 (1–2). Brill: 233–265. doi:10.1163/002249910X12573963244449.
- Mikaberidze, Alexander (2015). Historical Dictionary of Georgia (2 ed.). Rowman & Littlefield. ISBN 978-1442241466.
- Mitchell, Colin P. (2011). New Perspectives on Safavid Iran: Empire and Society. Taylor & Francis. ISBN 978-1-136-99194-3.
- Mitchell, Colin (2021). "Custodial politics and princely governance in sixteenth-century Safavid Iran". In Matthee, Rudi (ed.). The Safavid World. Routledge. pp. 79–110. ISBN 978-1138944060. Archived from the original on 2024-09-04.
- Momen, Moojan (1985). An Introduction to Shi'i Islam: The History and Doctrines of Twelver Shi'ism. New Haven, CT: Yale University Press. ISBN 978-0-85398-201-2.
- Floor, Willem; Javadi, Hasan (2022). The Role of Azerbaijani Turkish in Safavid Iran. Vol. 46. Cambridge University Press. Archived from the original on 2026-04-15.
- Munshī, Iskander (1978). The History of Shah ʻAbbas the Great. University of Michigan: Westview Press. ISBN 9780891582960.
- Nahavandi, Houchang; Bomati, Yves (1998). Shah Abbas, Empereur de Perse: 1587–1629 (in French). Paris: Perrin. ISBN 9782262011314. LCCN 99161812.
- Newman, Andrew J. (2009) [2006]. Safavid Iran: Rebirth of a Persian Empire. I.B. Tauris. ISBN 9781845118303.
- Rizvi, Kishmar (2015). "The Incarnate Shrine - Shi'ism and the Cult of Kingship in Early Safavid Iran". In Hahn, Cynthia; Klein, Holger A. (eds.). Saints and Sacred Matter - The Cult of Relics in Byzantium and Beyond (PDF). Washington, D.C.: Dumbarton Oaks Research Library and Collection. ISBN 978-0-88402-406-4. Archived (PDF) from the original on 2025-12-07.
- Roemer, Hans Robert (1986). "The Safavid Period". In Jackson, Peter; Lockhart, Laurence (eds.). The Cambridge History of Iran. Vol. 6: The Timurid and Safavid Periods. Cambridge University Press. ISBN 0-521-20094-6.
- Savory, Roger M. (1970). "The Safavid Persia". In Holt, Peter M.; Lambton, Ann K.S.; Lewis, Bernard (eds.). The Cambridge History of Islam: The Central Islamic Lands from Pre-Islamic Times to the First World War. Vol. 1A. Cambridge University Press. ISBN 9781139055024.
- Savory, Roger M. (1974). "The Safavid State and Polity". Iranian Studies. 28 (1/2). Cambridge University Press: 179–212. doi:10.1080/00210867408701463. JSTOR 4310161. (registration required)
- Savory, Roger M. (1999). "Safavids". In Burke, Peter; Inalcik, Halil (eds.). History of Humanity: Scientific and Cultural Development, Volume V: From the Sixteenth to the Eighteenth Century. Routledge.
- Savory, Roger M. (2007) [1980]. Iran Under the Safavids. Cambridge University Press. ISBN 978-0521042512.
- Sicker, Martin (2001). The Islamic World in Decline: From the Treaty of Karlowitz to the Disintegration of the Ottoman Empire. Greenwood Publishing Group. ISBN 978-0275968915.
- Streusand, Douglas E. (2011). Islamic Gunpowder Empires: Ottomans, Safavids, and Mughals. Westview Press. ISBN 9780813313597.
- Svanidze, Mikheil (2009). "The Amasya Peace Treaty between the Ottoman Empire and Iran (June 1, 1555) and Georgia". Bulletin of the Georgian National Academy of Sciences. 3 (1): 191–197. Archived from the original on December 22, 2025.
- Sykes, P. M. (1963) [1915]. A History of Persia. Vol. 2 (3rd ed.). Routledge.
- Tapper, Richard L. (1997). Frontier Nomads of Iran: A Political and Social History of the Shahsevan. Cambridge University Press. ISBN 9780511582257.
- Toynbee, Arnold J. (1939). A Study of History. Vol. V. Oxford University Press.
- Zabiollah, Safa (1986). "Persian Literature in the Safavid Period". In Lockhart, Laurence; Jackson, Peter (eds.). The Cambridge History of Iran: The Timurid and Safavid Periods. Vol. 6. Cambridge: Cambridge University Press. pp. 948–965. ISBN 0-521-20094-6.
