= Jondor =

- urban-type settlement
- Location in Uzbekistan
- Coordinates: 39°44′N 64°11′E
- Country: Uzbekistan
- Region: Bukhara Region
- District: Jondor District
- Urban-type settlement status: 1983

Population (2001)
  - Total: 8,700
- Time zone: UTC+5 (UZT)

Jondor (Uzbek: Jondor/Жондор, Russian: Жондор) is an urban-type settlement that is the seat of Jondor District in Bukhara Region in Uzbekistan.

== History ==
In 1938–1977 - the village of Sverdlovsk and the village of Sverdlovskaya in the Bukhara region of the Uzbek SSR, the administrative center of the district of the same name. Since 1981 - an urban-type settlement of Jondor, the administrative center of the Sverdlovsk (since 1992 - Jondor (Jandar)) district.

== Geography ==
Jondor is located 21 km west of the center of Bukhara and 465 km southwest of Tashkent. The closest cities to Jondor are: Bukhara (23 km), Galaasia (26 km), Romitan (26 km), Kagan (31 km), Qorakoʻl (38 km), Vabkent (42 km), Alat (48 km ), Shafirkan (50 km), Gijduvan (58 km), Karaulbazar (58 km), Qiziltepa ( 65 km), Gazli (75 km), Turkmenabat (88 km, Turkmenistan), Muborak (99 km), Kanimekh (101 km ), Zafarabad (112 km).

== Population ==
The urban village of Jondor ranks 170th in terms of population in Uzbekistan and 13th in the Bukhara region.

== Industry and economics ==
The most developed industrial sector is the textile industry. The enterprises produce fibers, non-woven material, yarn, and threads. The agricultural sector is mainly engaged in sericulture. There is a joint Uzbek - Chinese enterprise "Khadan" for the production of silk and silkworms, cocoons. There are food industry enterprises, a plant for canning fruits and vegetables grown in the area, small firms specializing in the production of building materials, wholesale and retail commercial organizations selling industrial and food products.

== Transport ==
The international highway Bukhara—Turkmanabad (Chorjoy) passes through Jondor.
