= Yangibazar =

Yangibazar may refer to:

- Yangibazar, Tajikistan
- Yangibozor, Tashkent Region, Uzbekistan
- Yangibozor, Bukhara Region, Uzbekistan
- Jangy-Bazar (disambiguation), several places in Kyrgyzstan

== See also ==
- Yangibozor (disambiguation)
