= Istehza Madrasah =

Madrasa in Bukhara, Uzbekistan

Istehza madrasah
- Istehza madrasasi
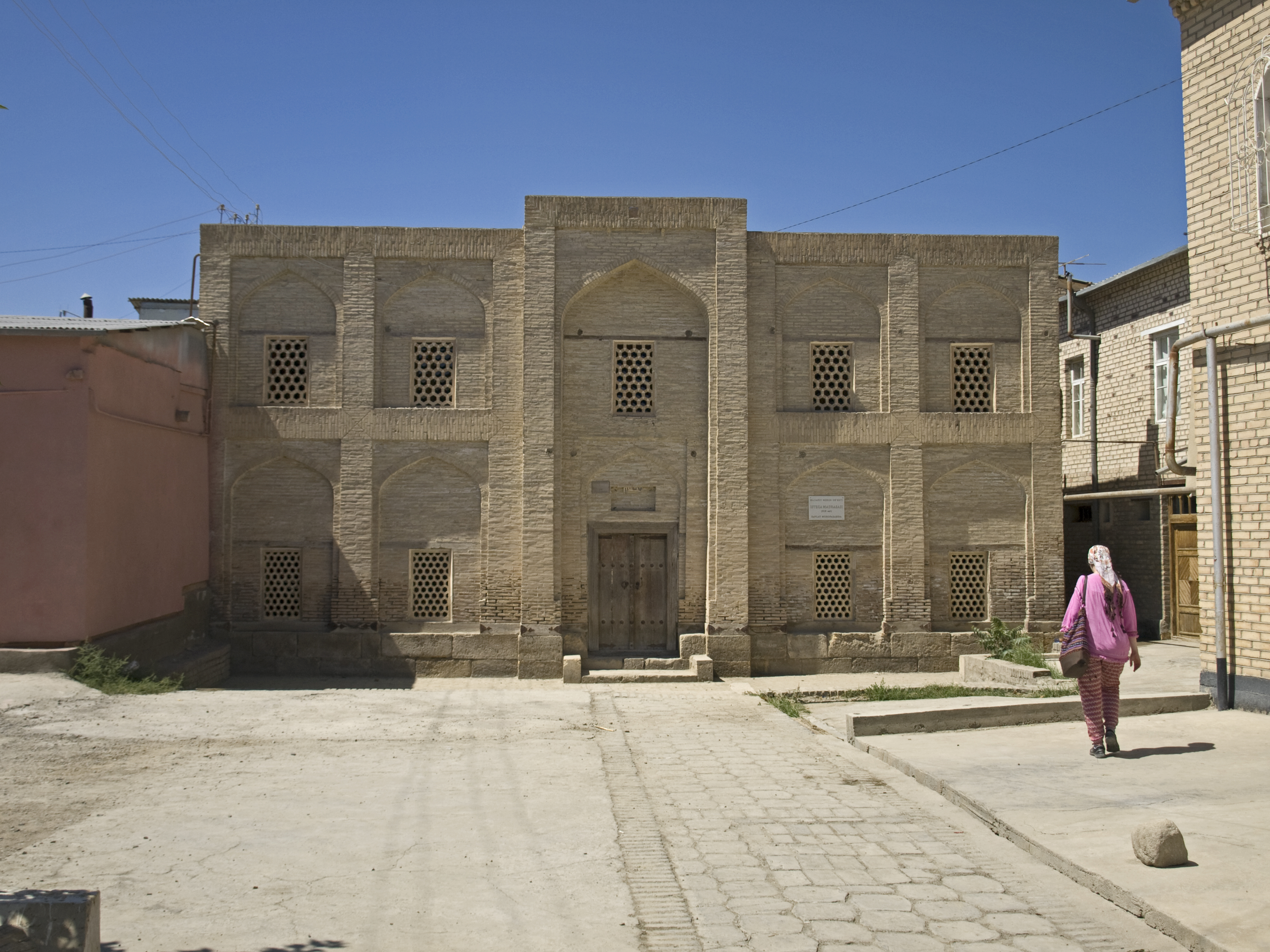
- Interactive map of the Istehza madrasah area
- Alternative names: Pushayman Madrasah; Muhammad Nabi Madrasah

General information
- Status: under the protection of the state
- Type: Madrasah
- Architectural style: Central Asian architecture
- Location: Koʻkaldosh MFY, Xoja Porso Street, Bukhara Region, Uzbekistan
- Coordinates: 39°46′27″N 64°25′22″E
- Opened: 1909
- Owner: State property. Bukhara Region Cultural Heritage Department on the basis of operational management rights

Technical details
- Material: baked bricks
- Size: 15 cells

Istehza madrasah (Pushayman Madrasah; Muhammad Nabi Madrasah) is a two-story madrasah building located in the historical center of the city of Bukhara, Bukhara Region, Republic of Uzbekistan. The smallest madrasah in Central Asia. It is included in the national list of real estate objects of material and cultural heritage of Uzbekistan.

== History ==
The madrasah was built in 1909 in the capital of Bukhara Emirate, Oybibi inaq (Oybinok), during the reign of the Uzbek ruler Abdulahad Khan (1885–1910), with the funds of Muhammad Nabi. According to information, Muhammad Nabi was mainly engaged in farming and carpet business. He came to Bukhara from Denov. The annual endowment property of the madrasah was equal to 22 thousand coins.

After the establishment of the Soviet rule, the education of students in the madrasah was terminated.

According to the State program developed in 2010, restoration and adaptation of the madrasah to modern use was planned in 2011, and 5 million soums were allocated for the implementation of these works.

The building of the madrasah, as an architectural monument of the city of Bukhara, was included in the national list of immovable property objects of the material and cultural heritage of Uzbekistan approved in 2019, and is now put into modern use as a tourist service facility.

It is located on Khoja Porso street, belonging to Kokaldosh MFY in Bukhara.

== Architecture ==
The madrasah building is made of two-story brick, has 15 rooms. In the 19th century, it formed an independent architectural ensemble together with the Oybinok mosque and the Ibrahim Akhund madrasah.

== Legends ==
It is reported that Muhammad Nabi decided to turn his house into a madrasah after having a quarrel with his children and formalized it as a waqf. However, later he reconciles with his sons and wants to change his decision. However, since the wealth that became the property of the foundation cannot be someone else's property, he will not be able to achieve his goal, and he deeply regrets it. Therefore, among the people, this madrasah is called Pushayman madrasa or Istehza (Isteza) madrasah.

== Literature ==
- Jumanazar A. (2017). Buxoro taʼlim tizimi tarixi. Toshkent: Akademnashr. p. 592. ISBN 978-9943-4728-2-2.
