= Mullo Mir Mausoleum =

Mausoleum in Bukhara, Uzbekistan

- Mullo Mir maqbarasi
- Hakim Mullo Mir mausoleum, Hoki Mullo Mir mausoleum
- Type: Mausoleum
- Cultures: Islamic
- Location: Bukhara, Uzbekistan
- Region: Bukhara Region

History
- Built: XVI century

Site notes
- Material: brick, wood, concrete

Mullo Mir Mausoleum (Hakim Mullo Mir mausoleum, Hoki Mullo Mir mausoleum) is an architectural monument in Romitan District, Bukhara Region. The monument was built in the 16th century. It is the mausoleum of Amir Husayn Mulla Mir, and a monastery was built next to it. The house was built in the 90s of the 16th century in the village of Hokimullamir. Amir Husayn Mulla Mir died in 1597. This year is written on the tombstone. In the Mausoleum of Mullo Mir there is a ceremonial building and a room. Mullo Mir is an architectural complex. The house consists of a gable, a wide facade, a dome in the center, and a porch. The area of the building is 26 meters. There are also guest rooms and two-story rooms. The room is rectangular in shape, the width of the main facade together with the corner towers is 20 meters, and the height is 17 meters. In addition, there is a public room in front of the house, which is covered with a dome.

The facade walls of the mausoleum are decorated with polished bricks and finished with ganch mixture. The windows are covered with spool bars and the dome has lattice domes. The grandson of Mulla Mir Mirkhond, Khojagon is one of the representatives of the Naqshbandi order. In the 16th century, the teachings of Tariqat and Sufism developed in the Khanate of Bukhara, and Mulla Mir created during this period. He is popularly known as Mir Hazrat Eshan and is known as a saint. The tomb of Mullo Mir is located on the eastern side of the room. There is a stone on Khazira with verses from the Holy Qur'an and information about genealogy.

== Literatures ==
- Ражабов Қ., Мухамаджонова Л (2015). Ромитан тумани тарихи. Тошкент: „Tafakkur“ нашриёти. p. 64.
- Баҳромов Қ, Шодиева Н (2020). Бухоро тарихий обидалари географияси. Бухоро: Дурдона нашриёти. p. 129.
