= Khoja Ubban mausoleum =

Mausoleum in Bukhara, Uzbekistan

Coordinates: 40.010°N 64.024°E

Khoja Ubban Mausoleum
- Xo'ja Ubbon maqbarasi
- Interactive map of Khoja Ubban Mausoleum
- Type: Mausoleum
- Cultures: Islamic
- Location: Bukhara, Uzbekistan
- Region: Bukhara Region

History
- Built: XVI century

Site notes
- Material: brick, wood, concrete

The Khoja Ubban mausoleum is an architectural monument in Romitan District, Bukhara Region. It was built in the 16th century. The monument is located 50 km from Bukhara and is famous as a pilgrimage site. Academician Abdulahad Muhammadjanov gave information about Khoja Ubban in his work "History of Lower Zarafshan Irrigation". There were fortress fortifications and a well at the Khoja Ubbon monument. The water of the Khoja Ubbon well is salty and bitter and used to cure skin diseases. Many people came to the pilgrimage site, lived temporarily in this place, drank water and bathed. From the 14th-15th centuries, Khoja Ubban was formed as a pilgrimage site. Over time, a pagoda was built around the monuments and a flag was raised. According to the research of archaeologists, it is possible to know that there was a hunter's settlement in this area in 3-4 millennia BC, people were engaged in animal husbandry and raised livestock [2]. is an architectural monument in Romitan district, Bukhara region. It was built in the 16th century. The monument is located 50 km from Bukhara and is famous as a pilgrimage site. Academician Abdulahad Muhammadjanov gave information about Khoja Ubban in his work "History of Lower Zarafshan Irrigation". There were fortress fortifications and a well at the Khoja Ubbon monument.

Khoja Ubban means "water patron" and "water guardian". According to legends and legends, Khoja Ubban was a representative of water for ships and boatmen of Amudarya, and a saint who brought rain. For this reason, waterless places and some villages located in Bukhara are called by terms such as Aqshih Baba, Sultan Hubbi, Ubban, Hazrat Hubbin. Khoja Ubbon's temple was a complex of several monuments. The well of the shrine is made of baked brick in the style of the khortak, and there are rooms and huts next to it. In 1964, the well and the architectural monument at the shrine of Khoja Ubban were demolished. But soon, a new well was opened there, new buildings were built, and saghanas were repaired.

== Literatures ==
- Ражабов Қ., Мухамаджонова Л (2015). Ромитан тумани тарихи. Тошкент: „Tafakkur“ нашриёти. p. 64.
- Баҳромов Қ, Шодиева Н (2020). Бухоро тарихий обидалари географияси. Бухоро: Дурдона нашриёти. p. 129.
