= Asad Gulzoda =

Tajik poet (1935–2023)

- Асад Гулзодаи
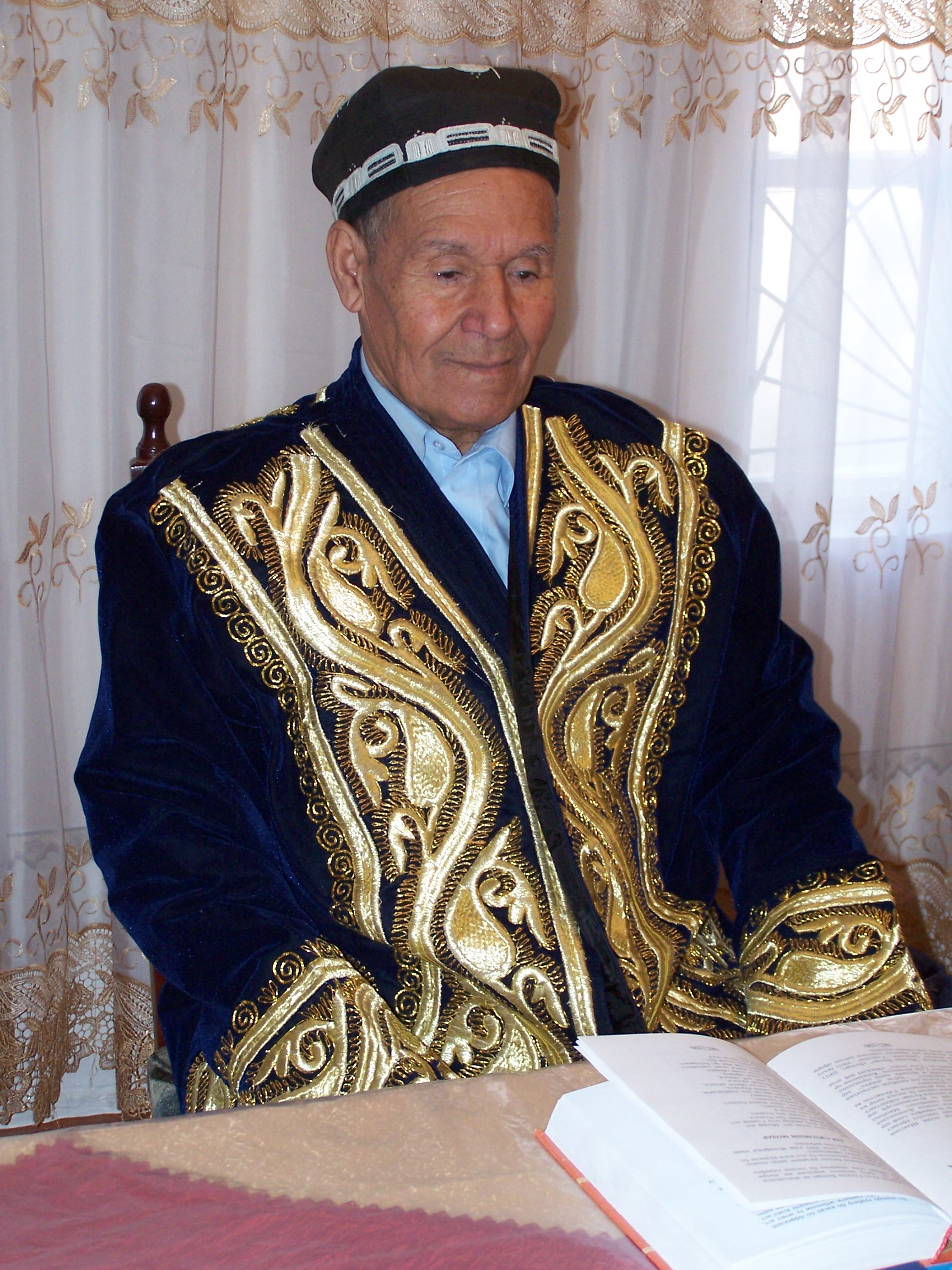
- Gulzoda in 2010
- Born: Asad Gulov; 5 January 1935; Shavgon, Peshku District, Bukhara Region, Uzbekistan
- Died: 29 May 2023 (aged 88)
- Other name: Asad Gulzodai Bukhoroyi
- Education: University of Dushanbe
- Occupations: Poet, linguist, journalist

Asad Gulov, also known as Asad Gulzodai Bukhoroyi or Asad Gulzoda (Tajik: Асад Гулзодаи Бухороӣ; 5 January 1935 – 29 May 2023) was a Tajik poet, linguist and journalist.

== Life ==
Asad Gulzoda was born in 1935 in the village of Shavgon of Peshku District, Bukhara Region, Uzbekistan. He received his secondary education at the same place. In 1958, he graduated from the Tajik Language and Literature Department, University of Dushanbe. His next work and activity is related to teaching and journalism in the State Broadcasting Company of Bukhara region.

Asad Gulzoda went into poetry during his adolescence. His poems were published in the newspapers of Uzbekistan and Tajikistan.

Poems of Asad Gulzoda were published in the books "Murghobi chi mekobad?", "Labzi Shirin" in "Maorif" publishing house of Dushanbe. And also his poems are found in the collections "Kahkashoni orzu" (Tashkent) and "Guli murod" (Dushanbe).

In the books "Nasimi Bukhoro" (Bukhara, 2001), "Khati peshona" (Dushanbe, "Surushan", 2003) some of the best poems of the poet are collected, written in the bright periods of his life.

In 2004 "Maorif va farhang" publishing house of Dushanbe published the collection of poems under the name of "Shukifahoyi Bukhoro" and in 2007 the collections "Namozi ro'i barg" and "Nafasi bahor".

Poems of Asad Gulzoda describe Bukhara and its unique landscapes, life and labor of the population of this ancient city. Most of his poems are dedicated to children.

Gulzoda was a member of the Writers' Union of Tajikistan since 2003.

Asad Gulzoda died on 29 May 2023, at the age of 88.
