= Rashid Madrasah =

Madrasa in Bukhara, Uzbekistan

Rashid madrasah
- Rashid madrasasi
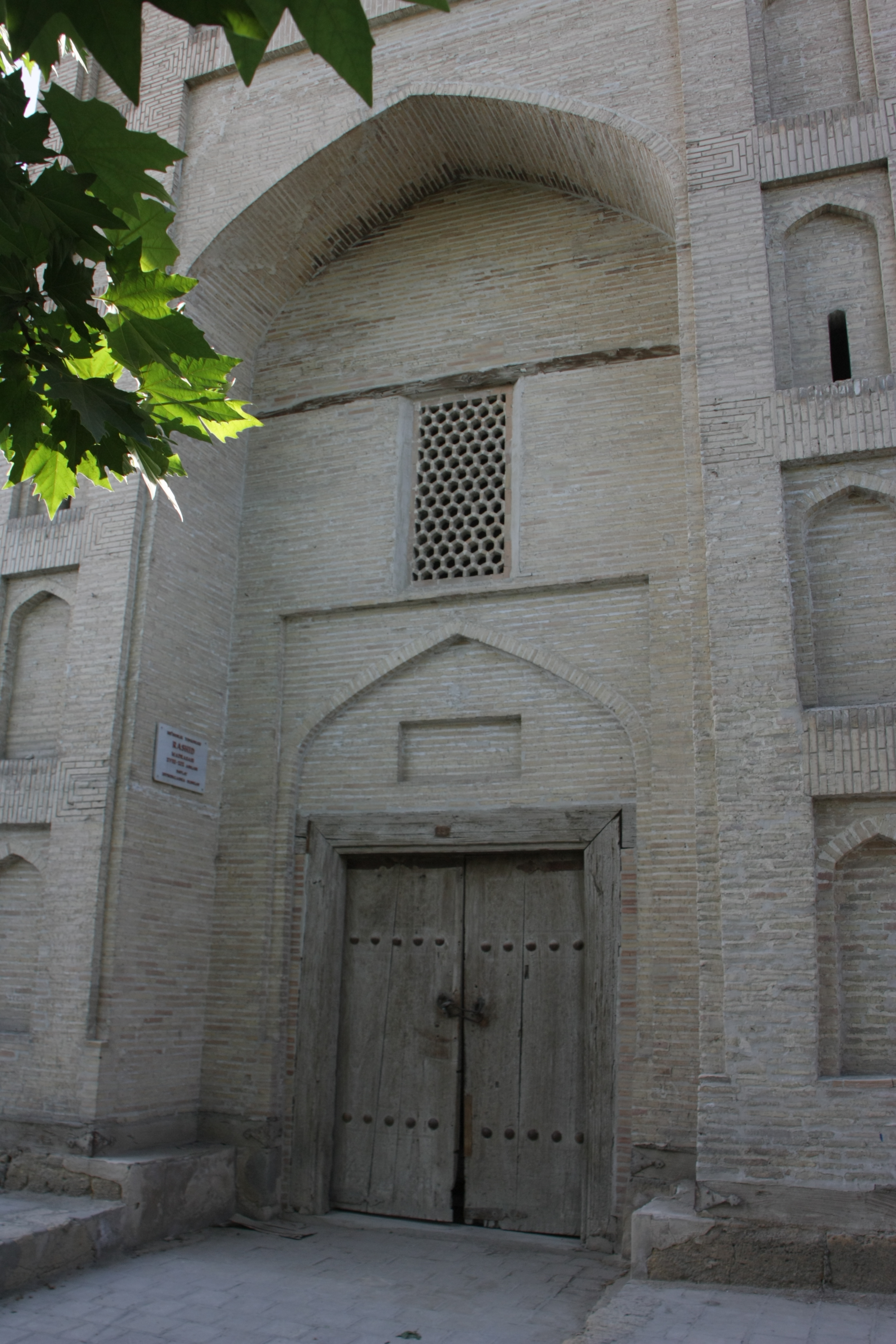
- Madrasah courtyard. 2015.
- Interactive map of the Rashid madrasah area
- Alternative names: Abdurashid madrasah

General information
- Status: under the protection of the state
- Type: Madrasah
- Architectural style: Central Asian architecture
- Location: Hamid Olimjon MFY, Bahouddin Naqshband Street, Bukhara Region, Uzbekistan
- Coordinates: 39°46′23″N 64°24′52″E
- Opened: 2nd half of the 19th century
- Owner: State property. Bukhara Region Cultural Heritage Department on the basis of operational management rights

Technical details
- Material: baked bricks
- Size: 25 cells
- Floor count: two floors

Rashid madrasah (Abdurashid madrasah) is a two-story madrasah building located in the historical center of the city of Bukhara, Bukhara Region, Republic of Uzbekistan. It is included in the national list of real estate objects of material and cultural heritage of Uzbekistan.

Despite the allocation of funds under the 2010 state program for the restoration and repair of the madrasah, it remains in a state of disrepair until now.

== History ==
The madrasah was built in the second half of the 19th century in the capital of Bukhara Emirate, Mekhtar Shafe' (later called Hovuzi Rashid), during the reign of the Uzbek ruler Muzaffar Khan (1860–1885), with the funds of a rich merchant from Afghanistan named Abdurashid (Rashid). Abdurashid was one of the big tea wholesalers in Bukhara during Muzaffar Khan's time. He also built a large marble pond in front of the madrasah.

After the establishment of the Soviet rule, the education of students in the madrasah was terminated.

According to the state program developed in 2010, it is planned to study the madrasah in 2013, to separate its parts into pieces, to clean, structurally strengthen, restore, restore and conserve, to prepare for modern use, and despite the allocation of 50 million soums for the purpose of these works, currently the building is in a state of disrepair.

The madrasah building, as an architectural monument of the city of Bukhara, was included in the national list of immovable property objects of the material and cultural heritage of Uzbekistan approved in 2019.

It is located on the street named after Bahauddin Naqshband belonging to Hamid Olimjon MFY in Bukhara.

== Architecture ==
The madrasah is made of baked brick and has two floors. It consists of 25 cells.

== Legends ==
According to reports, the merchant Abdurashid had a strange wife. Every day, she complained about her marriage and said: "Take him away, take this away" and did not leave her husband alone. Tired of such whims, Abdurashid took away his wife's jewelry on condition that he sold them and built a large marble pool in front of the madrasah he built.

== Literatures ==
- Jumanazar A. (2017). Buxoro taʼlim tizimi tarixi. Toshkent: Akademnashr. p. 592. ISBN 978-9943-4728-2-2.
