= Turkman Madrasa =

Turkman madrasa (Rahmatulla toʻqsabo madrasa)
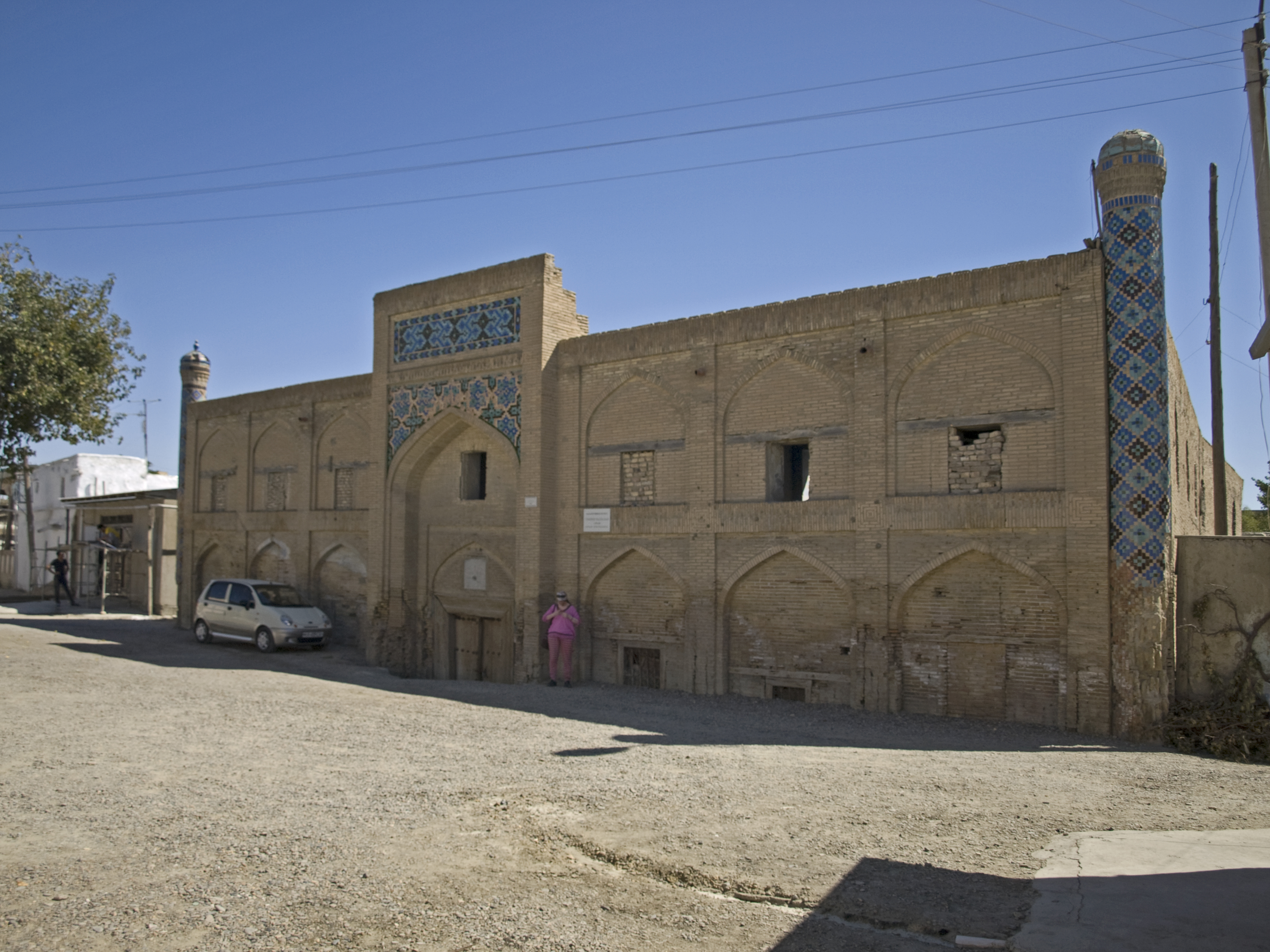
- Turkman madrasa
- Interactive map of the Turkman madrasa (Rahmatulla toʻqsabo madrasa) area

General information
- Location: Kemuxtgaron Street, Bukhara city, Bukhara region, Republic of Uzbekistan
- Year built: 1905–1910
- Completed: 1910

Technical details
- Material: Baked brick
- Floor count: 2

Design and construction
- Architect: Rahmatullaboy qorovulbegi turkman

The Turkman Madrasa (other names: Rahmatulla toʻqsabo madrasa) is a two-story madrasa building located in the historical center of Bukhara city, Bukhara region, Republic of Uzbekistan. It is included in the national register of immovable property objects of Uzbekistan's material and cultural heritage.

Despite the allocation of funds for the construction and renovation of the madrasa according to the state program of 2010, it has remained in a neglected and dilapidated condition until now.

== History ==
The madrasa was built in 1905–1910 in the Kemuxtgaron quarter of the capital of the Bukhara Emirate, during the reign of the Uzbek ruler Abdulahad Khan (1885–1910), by Rahmatullaboy qorovulbegi Turkman with his own funds. According to the sources, Rahmatullaboy Turkman was a businessman who traded with qorakoʻl wool. He came from Chorjoʻy to Bukhara, and held the titles of qorovulbegi and toʻqsabo in the emirate. The madrasa he built consisted of 34 rooms.

After the establishment of the Soviet rule, the education of students in the madrasa was stopped.

According to the State Program adopted in 2010, the madrasa was planned to be surveyed, its emergency parts separated, structurally reinforced, built and repaired, its decorative ornaments restored and conserved in 2011, and these works were allocated 100 million soums for the purpose of implementing, but the madrasa has remained in a dilapidated condition until now.

The madrasa building, as an architectural monument of Bukhara city, was included in the national register of immovable property objects of Uzbekistan's material and cultural heritage, approved in 2019, and it was planned to transfer it to modern use as a tourist service object in the future.

According to the data of 2020, an investor has submitted a project for the preservation of the integrity of the Turkman madrasa, improving its condition, restoring it and transforming it into an attractive object for tourists. The preliminary project for the establishment of a tourist service object on the basis of the madrasa has been prepared and submitted to the Scientific-Expert Council under the Department of Cultural Heritage of Uzbekistan.

It is located on Kemuxtgaron Street, which belongs to Mirzo Ulugbek MFY in Bukhara city.

== Architecture ==
The madrasa building is made of baked brick, 2-story, consisting of 34 rooms. Its portal is decorated with koshin tiles.

There is a marble plaque above the door of the madrasa. It has 2 columns and 7 rows of poetry written on it. The marble plaque is cracked and divided into 3 parts. In the middle, there is a deep trace of a bullet. The bullet has damaged the writings on the 3rd row from the bottom. The inscription on the plaque states that this madrasa was built by Rahmatullaboy qorovulbegi Turkman, the pride of the Turkmans, during the reign of Amir Abdulahad Khan. Below the last line, the year 1329 AH (1910 AD) is indicated. His coming from Chorjoʻy to Bukhara is also confirmed by the writings on this plaque.

== Bibliography ==
- Jumanazar A. (2017). Buxoro taʼlim tizimi tarixi (in Uzbek). Toshkent: Akademnashr. p. 592. ISBN 978-9943-4728-2-2.
