= Yangibozor =

Yangibozor may refer to:

Places

- Yangibozor, Bukhara Region, town in Bukhara Region, Uzbekistan.
- Yangibozor, Xorazm Region, town in Xorazm Region, Uzbekistan.
- Yangibozor, Tashkent Region, town in Tashkent Region, Uzbekistan.

== See also ==
- Yangibazar (disambiguation)
