= Shirbudun Palace =

Palace complex in Bukhara, Uzbekistan

- Shirbudun saroyi (Uzbek)
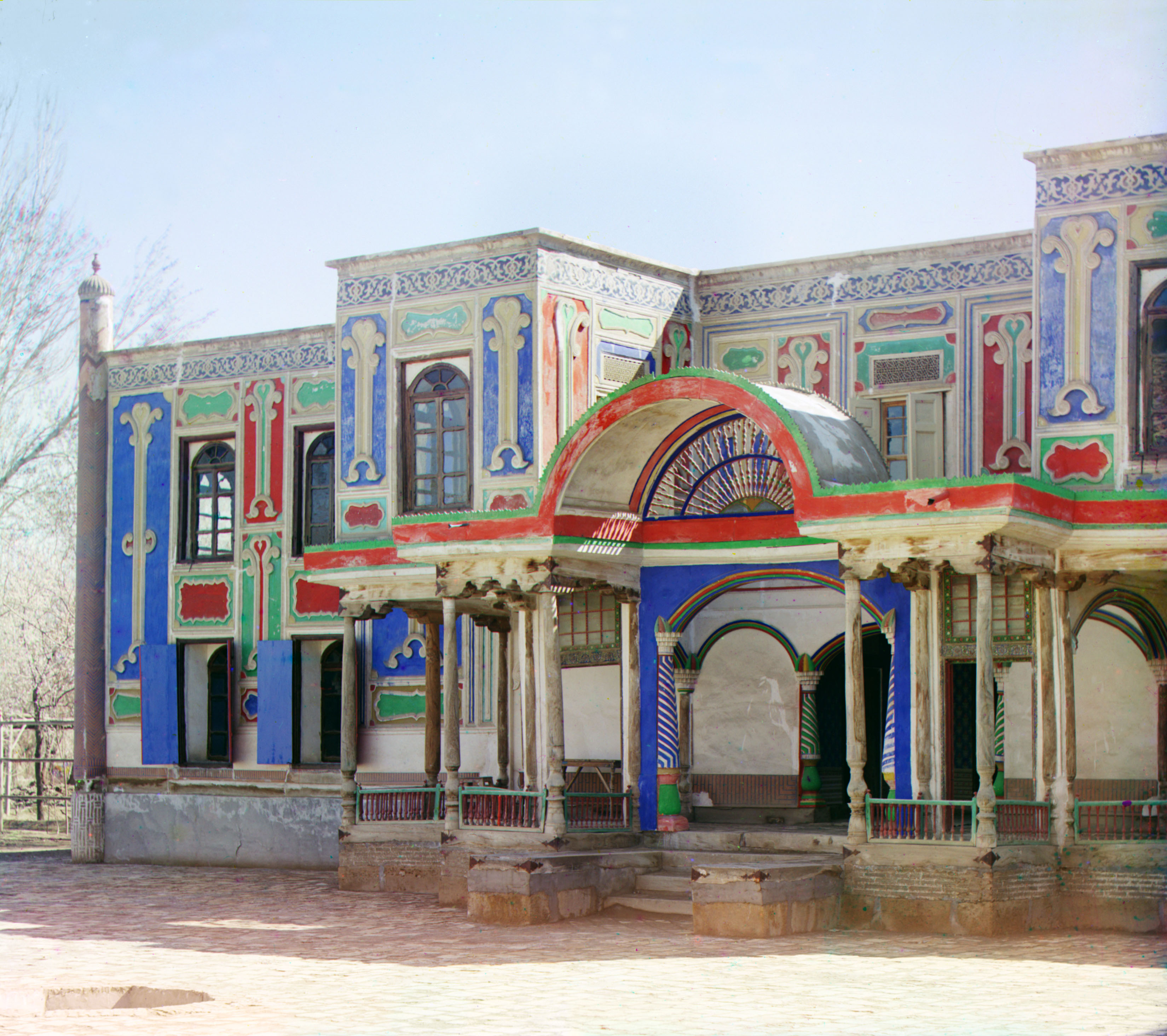
- Shirbudun Palace
- Location: Bukhara, Uzbekistan
- Nearest city: Bukhara

History
- Built: 1870
- Built for: Palace
- Demolished: 1930

Site notes
- Architect: Ibrahim Hafizov

Shirbudun Palace (uzbek: Shirbudun saroyi) is a palace complex in Bukhara, Uzbekistan, that served as one of the political centers of the Bukhara emirs. The construction of the palace began around 1870 during the rule of Muzaffar bin Nasrullah (1860–1885) in the Bukhara Emirate. In the 1870s, under the direction of the architect Abdurasul and the plasterer Rahim Hayotov, the palace complex, including the palace itself, a reception hall, a pool, a mosque, and other buildings, was built in Shirbudun. The external appearance of the palace reflects architectural features from Iran and Europe. During the reign of Emir Abd al-Ahad Khan, several palace chambers and elegant halls were added to the palace.

== History ==
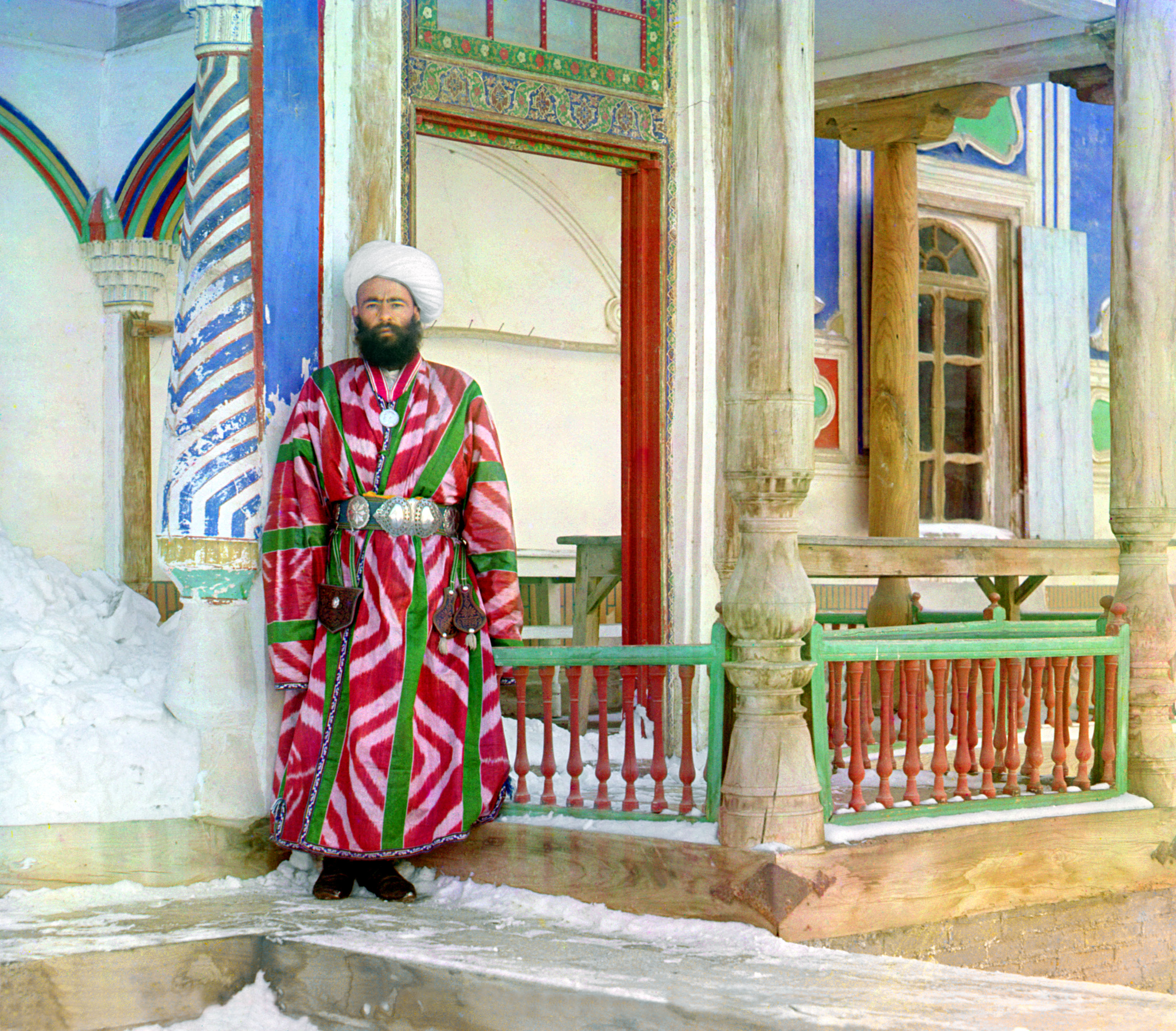
Lost Shirbudun Palace in Bukhara. Residence of the last Bukhara emirs.

Shirbudun Palace was constructed during the rule of Muzaffar bin Nasrullah (1860–1885) and Emir Abd al-Ahad Khan (1885–1910) in the Bukhara Emirate . In the 1870s, under the direction of the plasterer Rahim Hayotov, the architect Abdurasul, and others, various buildings were erected in Shirbudun, including the palace, a mosque, and a reception hall. The external appearance of the palace exhibits architectural features from Europe and Iran. According to Ole Olufsen's records, Shirbudun was situated approximately 3 versts (1 verst equals 1.066 km) from the Yangi Bukhara road, surrounded by a high wall.

Muzaffar bin Nasrullah used the palace to receive foreign ambassadors and influential guests, in addition to hosting public festivities, weddings, and various events. During these festivities, up to 500 tents were pitched in Shirbudun, as recorded in the "Tarjimon" newspaper on April 22, 1897. The palace boasted European-designed furniture and ornate lighting fixtures. Construction activities continued in this area during the reign of subsequent rulers, including Emir Abdulahadxon, who added an elegant hall and several palace chambers to the complex.

In the years of independence, the building became the property of the Ministry of Agriculture of the Bukhara People's Soviet Republic from 1920 to 1924. In the 1960s, within its boundaries, the building served as the headquarters for the Bukhara Regional Water Supply, and in the present day, it continues to function actively as a community center. The Shirbudun complex, funded by the Bukhara emirs, gained significant social, economic, political, and cultural importance in its time.

== Toponymy ==
Shirbudun - pronounced as Sherbadan or Sherbudin - these words have distinct meanings. For instance, while the word "Shirbadan" in Persian and Tajik means "Shir" (milk) and "badan" (body), the term "Shirbudun" conveys the meanings related to the "Shir" people or tribe. "Shir," "sir," and "chir" are names used by ancient Turkic peoples. The term "Sir budun," meaning the "tribe of Sir" or "people of Sir," is mentioned in the Kultegin memorial (732 AD). Therefore, the name "Shirbudun" for the village located to the east of Bukhara retains the term "budun" as part of its toponym, indicating its affiliation with the mentioned historical period (i.e., the 10th to 11th centuries) when the tribe "Shir" (Sir, Chir) was settled in one of Bukhara's districts. In many cases, the population living in this village was referred to as "urug" (tribe, people) during that time. The term "Shirbudun" is predominantly pronounced in the manner of "Sherbudin" in modern times, likely due to the presence of the Sherbudin Trade Complex in the area. In 2007, the neighborhood residents adopted the name "Shirbudun" for their community during a local gathering.

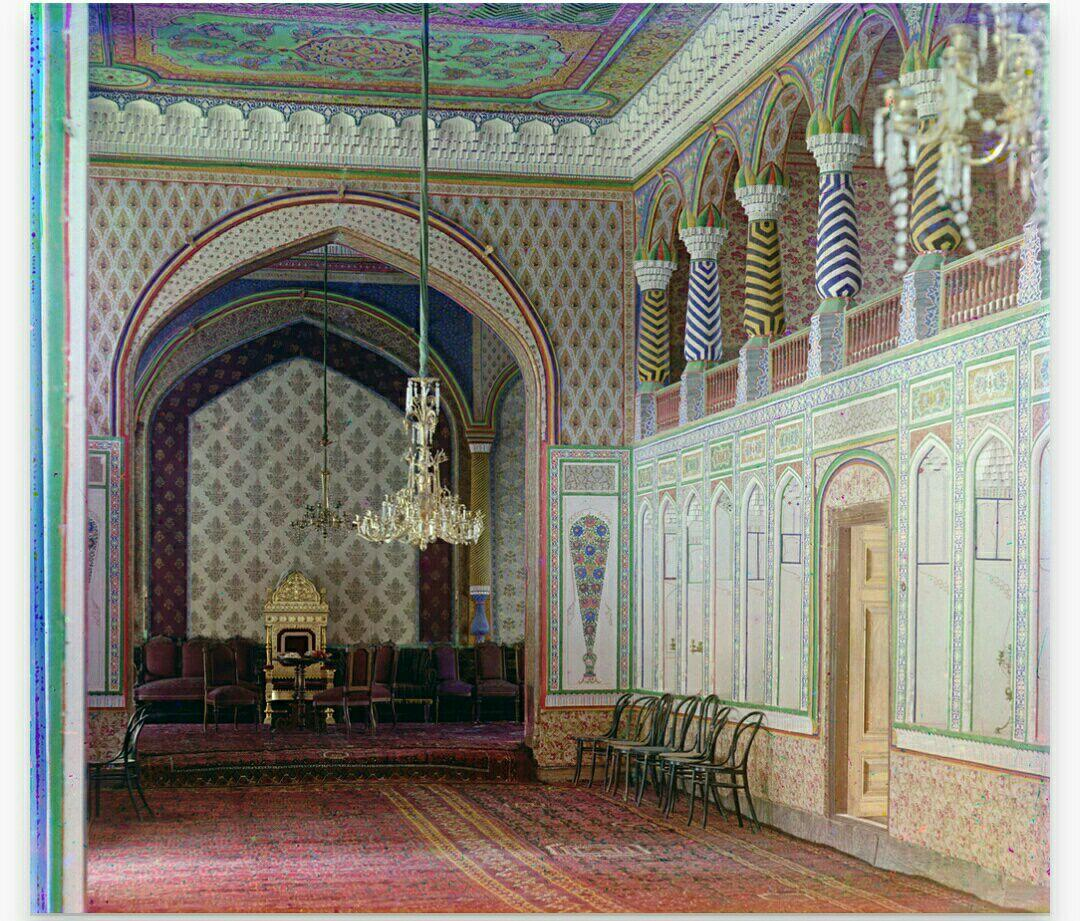
Lost Shirbudun Palace in Bukhara. Residence of the last Bukhara emirs.

== Architecture ==
The palace walls are 10 meters high, shaped like a crescent moon. Unlike other palaces, it has unique domes and is adorned with various fruit trees, flowers, and fragrant rose bushes. Some parts of the palace are constructed with bricks, while others are made with clay and coated with golden plaster. The Shirbudun Palace consists of several small rooms built in various Persian architectural styles. Some rooms are adorned with decorative patterns on the walls. The designs within the medallions on the walls blend Eastern and Western influences. There is also a decorated room with a height of 4 arshins (1 arshin equals 0.711 meters), featuring walls adorned with intricate carvings.

In the courtyard of the palace, there is a large pool made of white marble and a place for a fountain. The palace features a reception hall, exquisitely decorated and furnished, with balconies and clay cornices. The minbar in the hall is adorned with the emperor's throne, a gift from the Russian emperor. The pillars are adorned with beautifully carved filigree. Behind the reception hall, there are upper floors with marble columns and ornate carvings. The palace includes various rooms adorned with different types of fabric and curtains made of clay. Gumbaz-style rooms, bathhouses, fountains, and gardens are also present within the palace complex.

== Gallery ==
Gallery

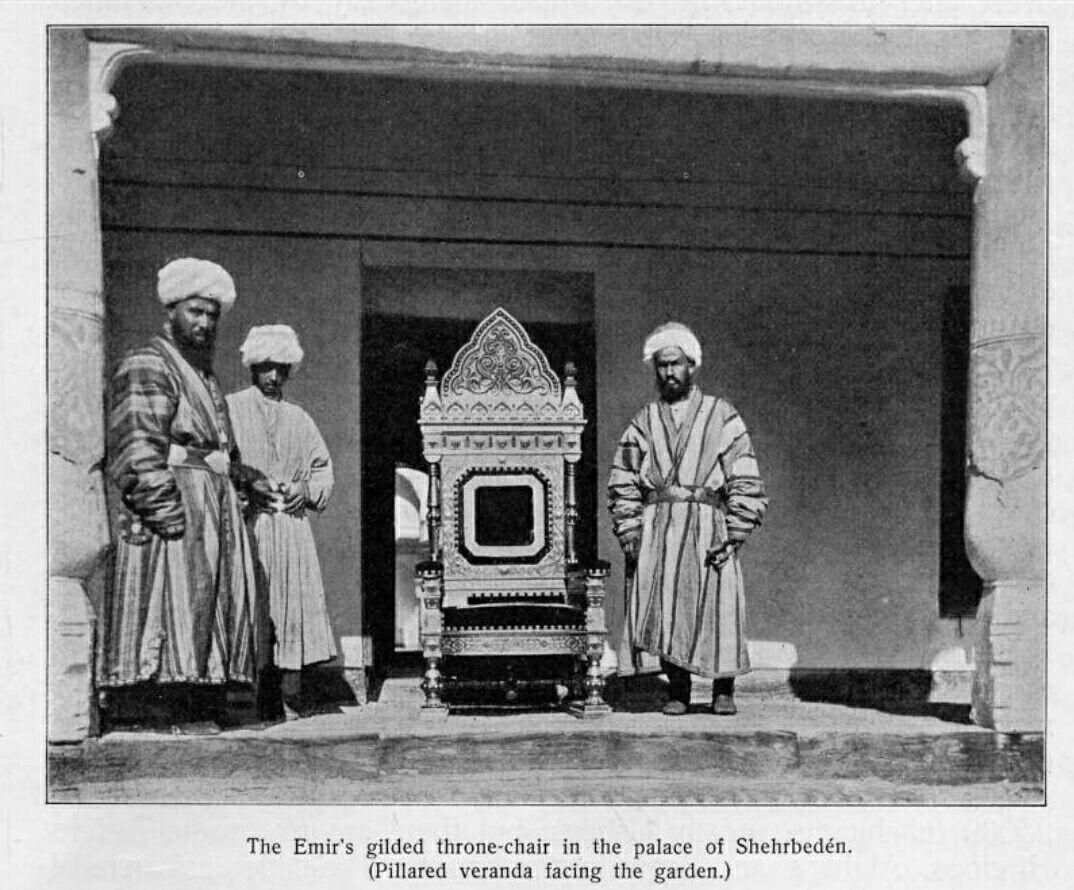
Lost Shirbudun Palace in Bukhara. Residence of the last Bukhara emirs.

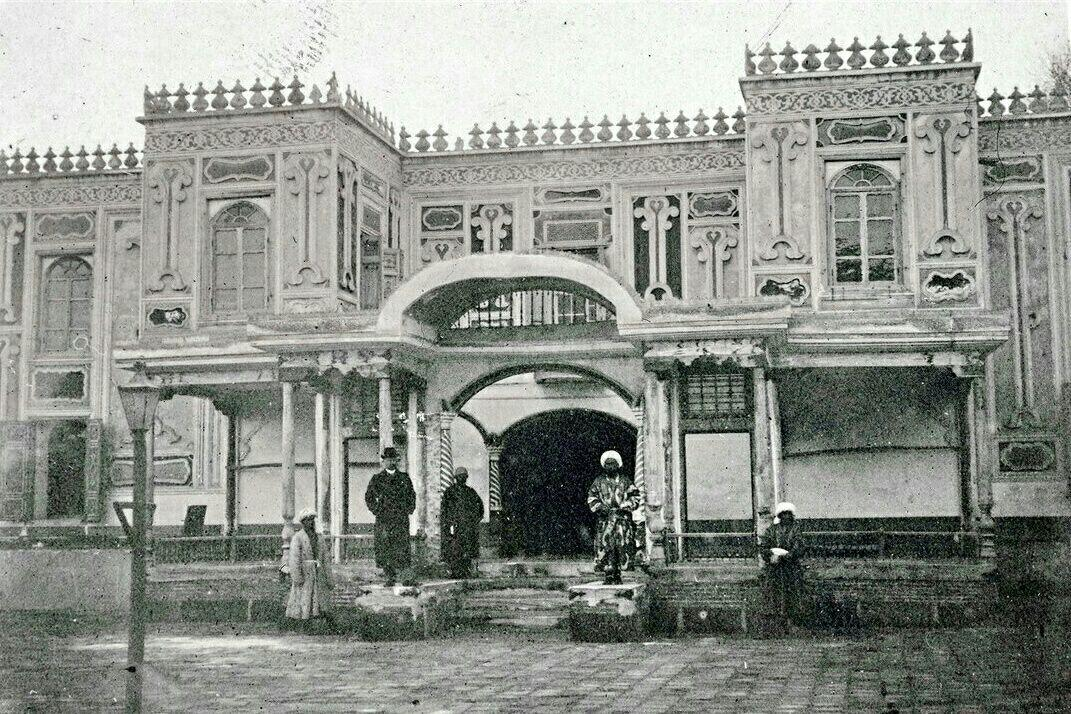
Shirbudun Palace

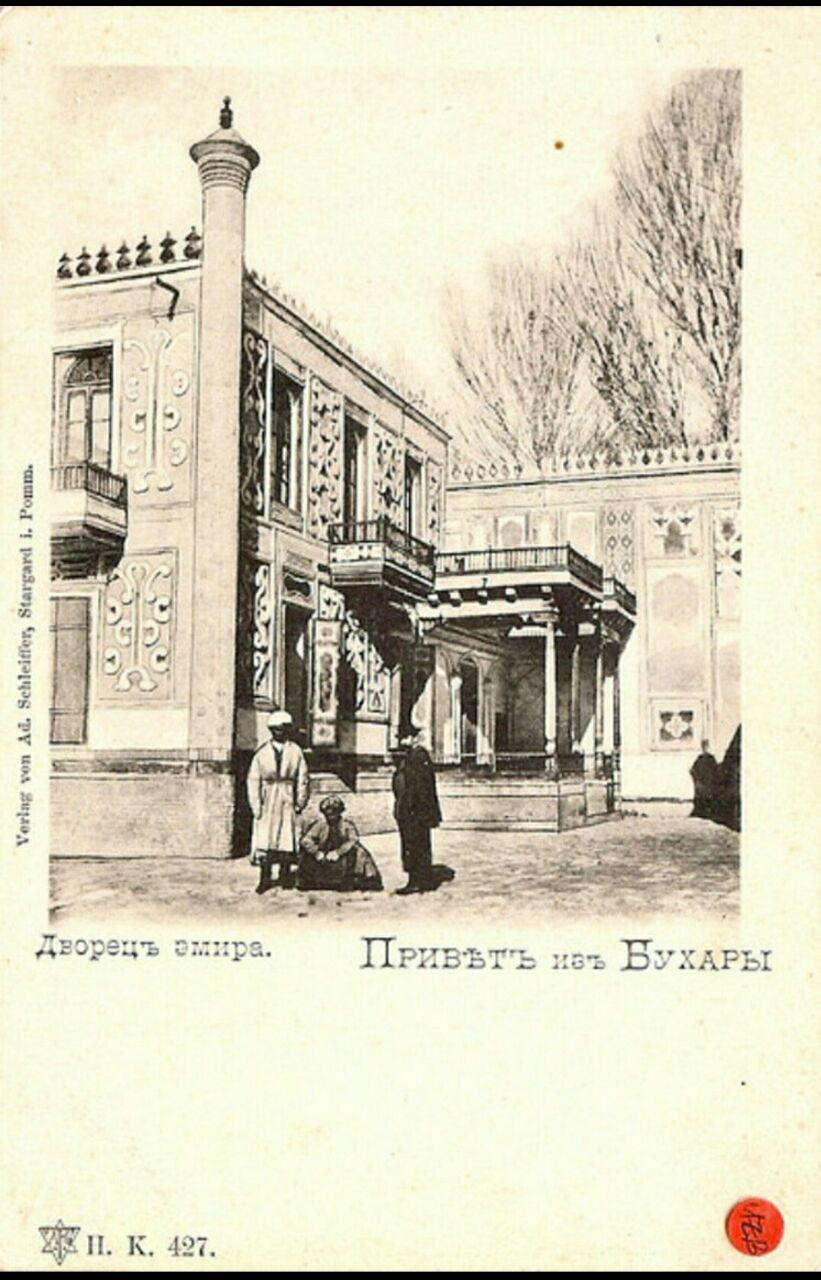
Shirbudun Palace

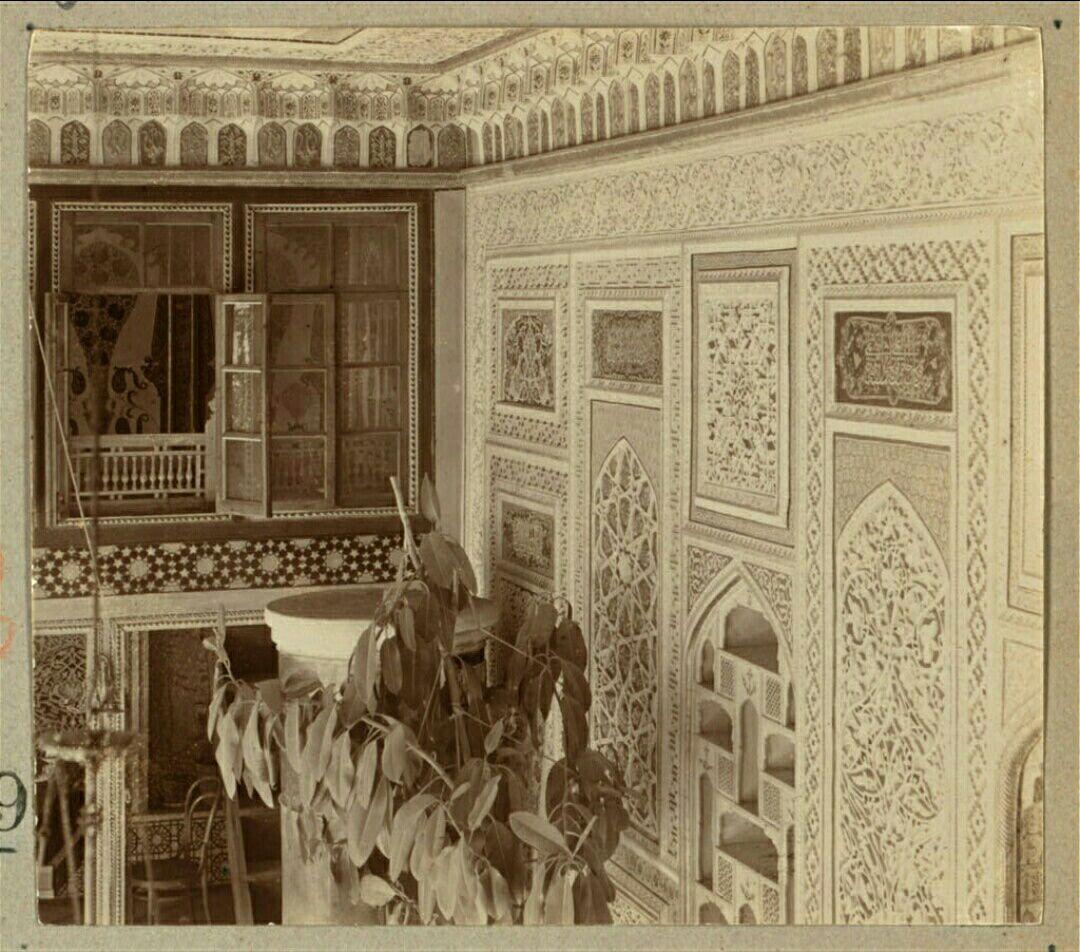
Shirbudun Palace

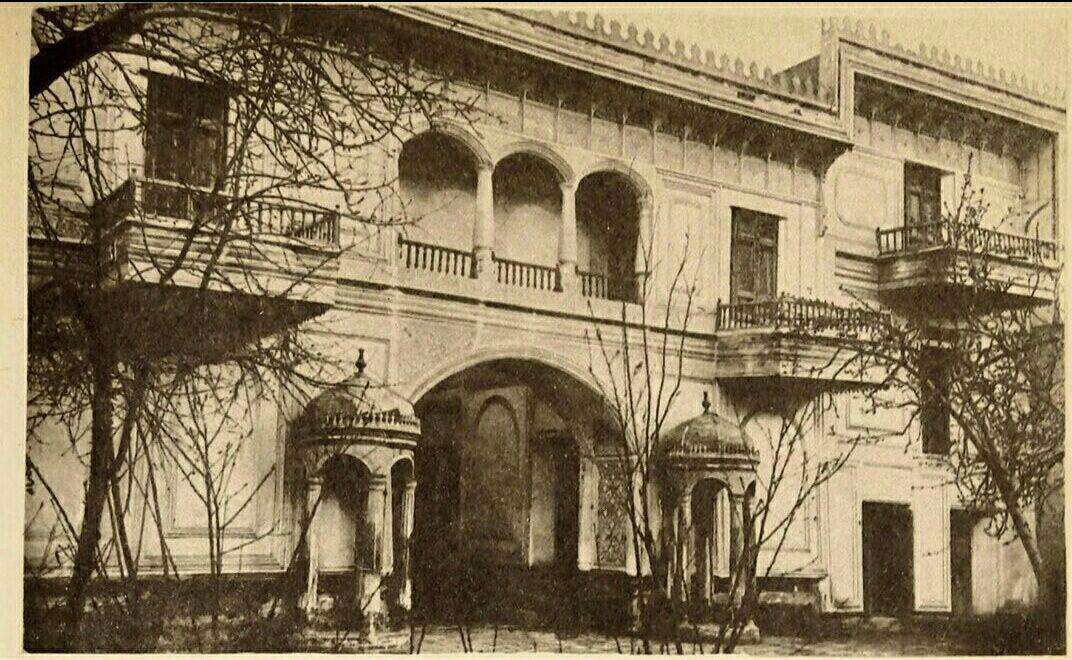
Shirbudun Palace

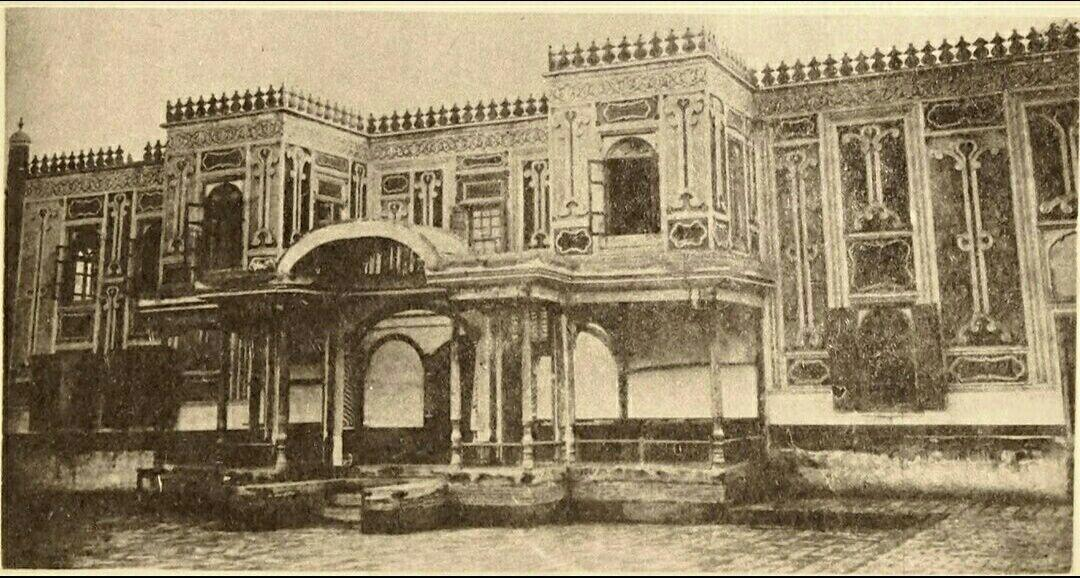
Shirbudun Palace

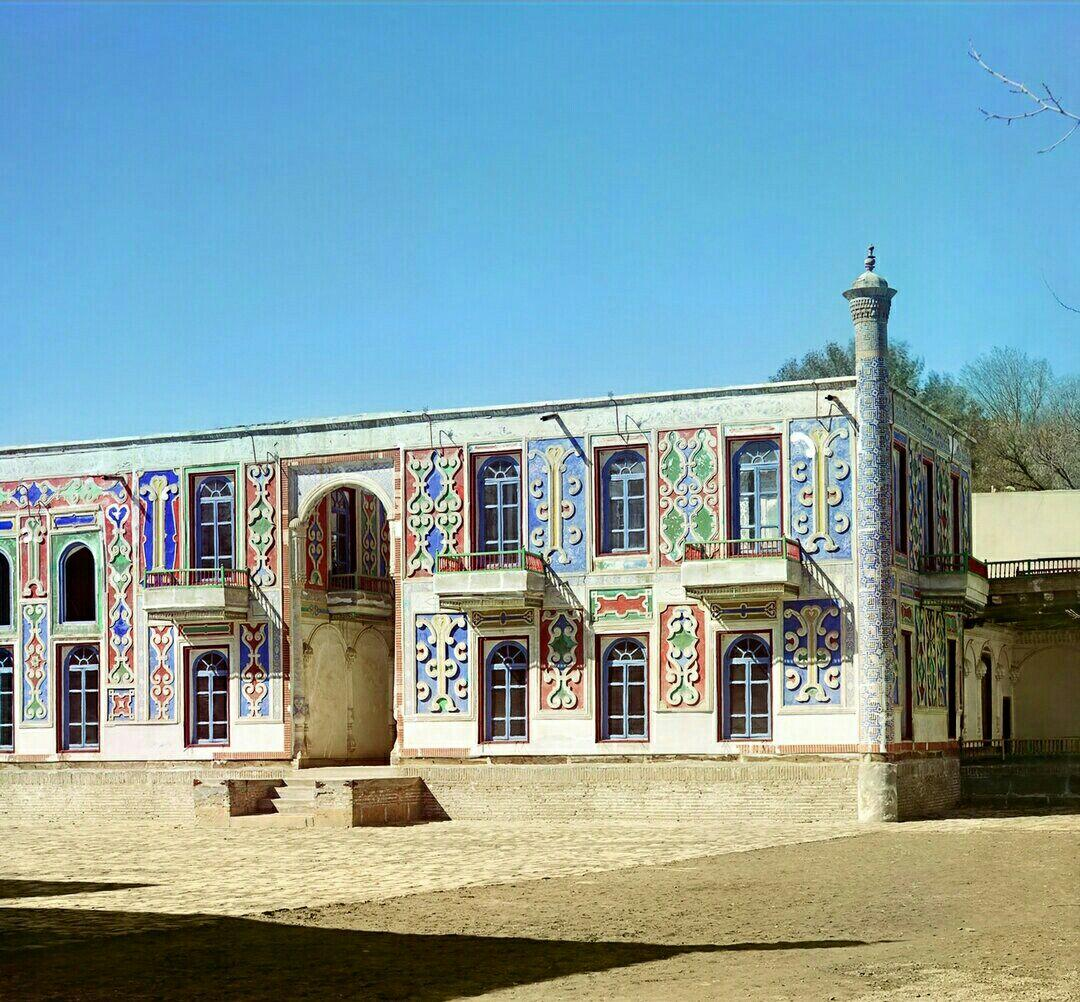
Shirbudun Palace

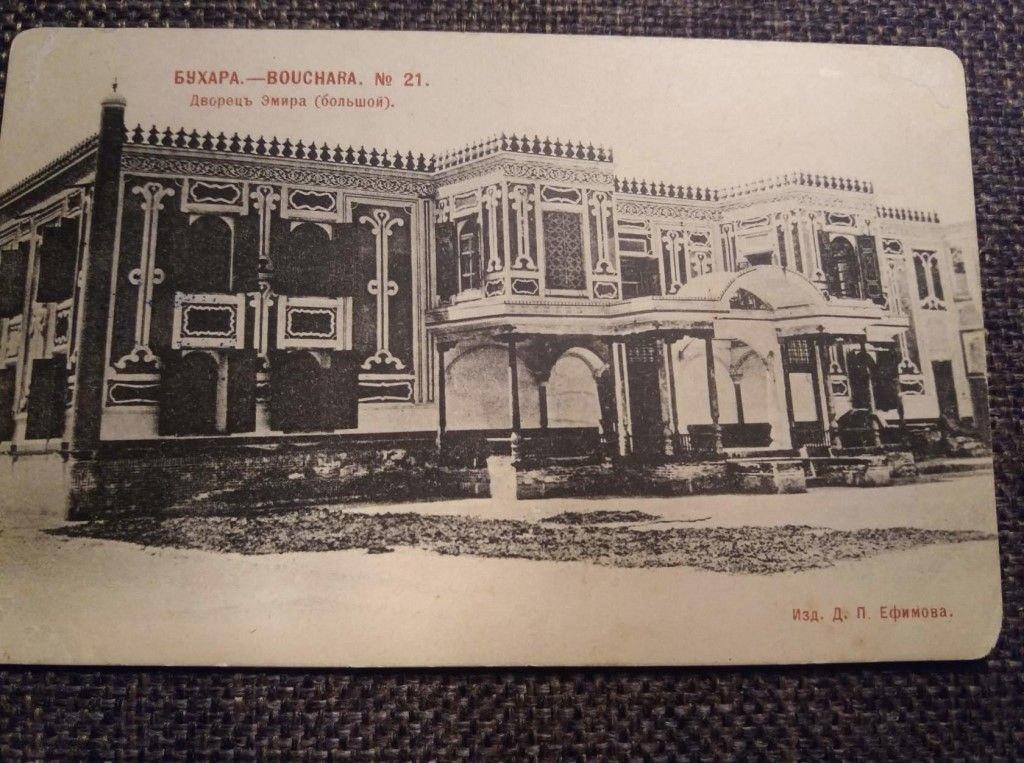
Shirbudun Palace

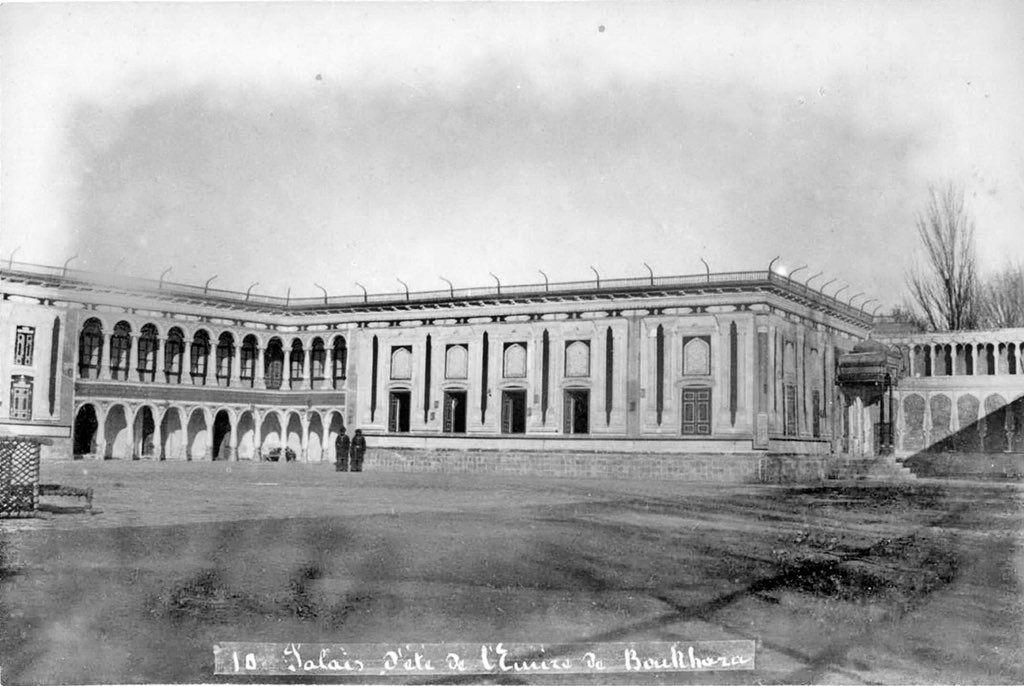
Shirbudun Palace

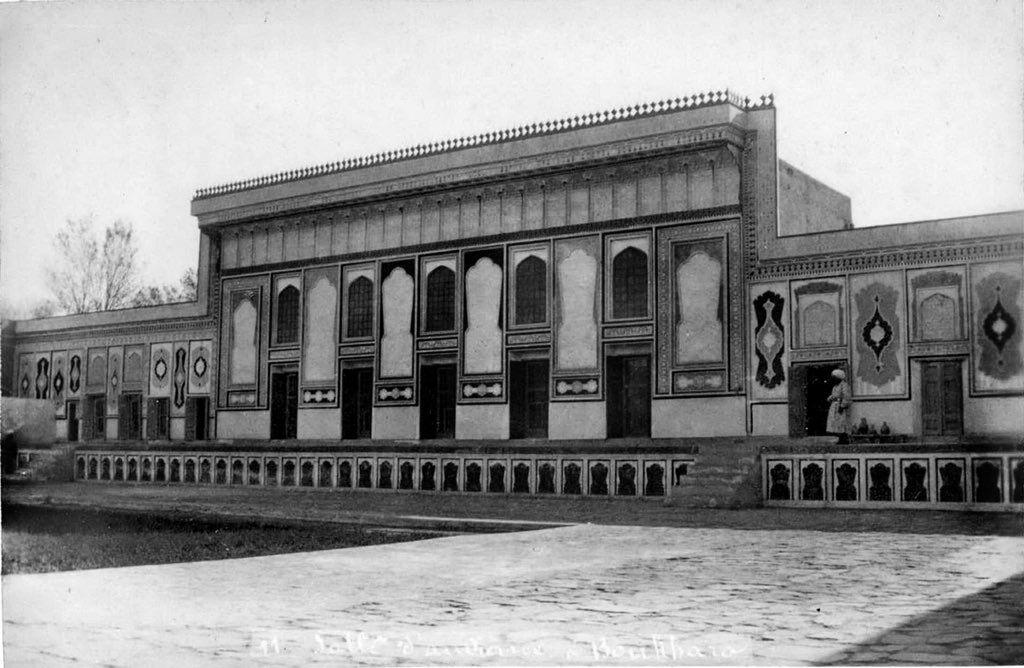
Shirbudun Palace

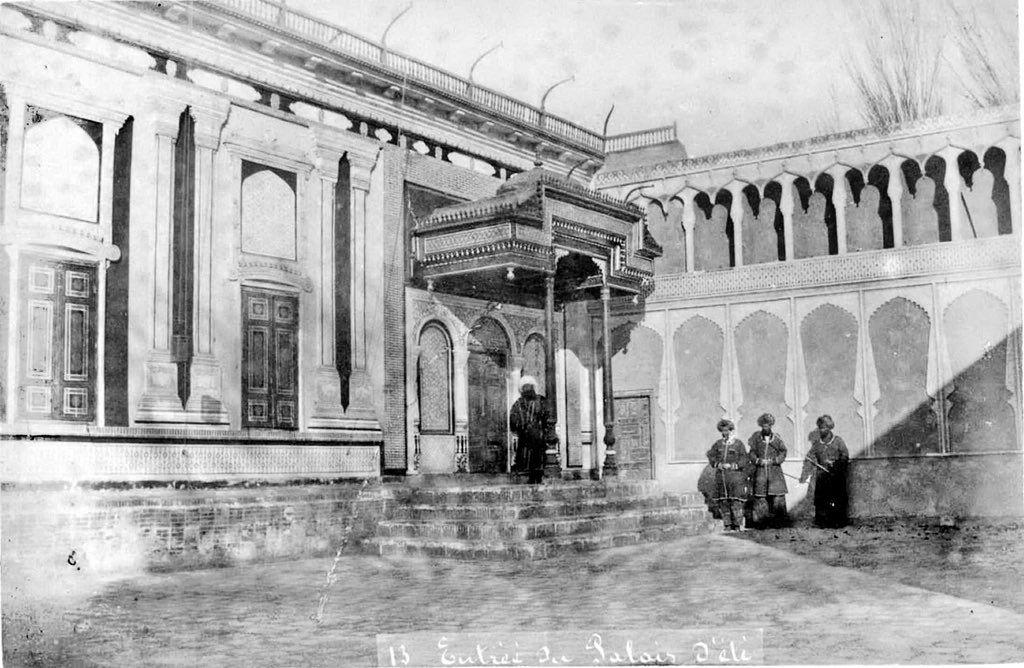
Shirbudun Palace

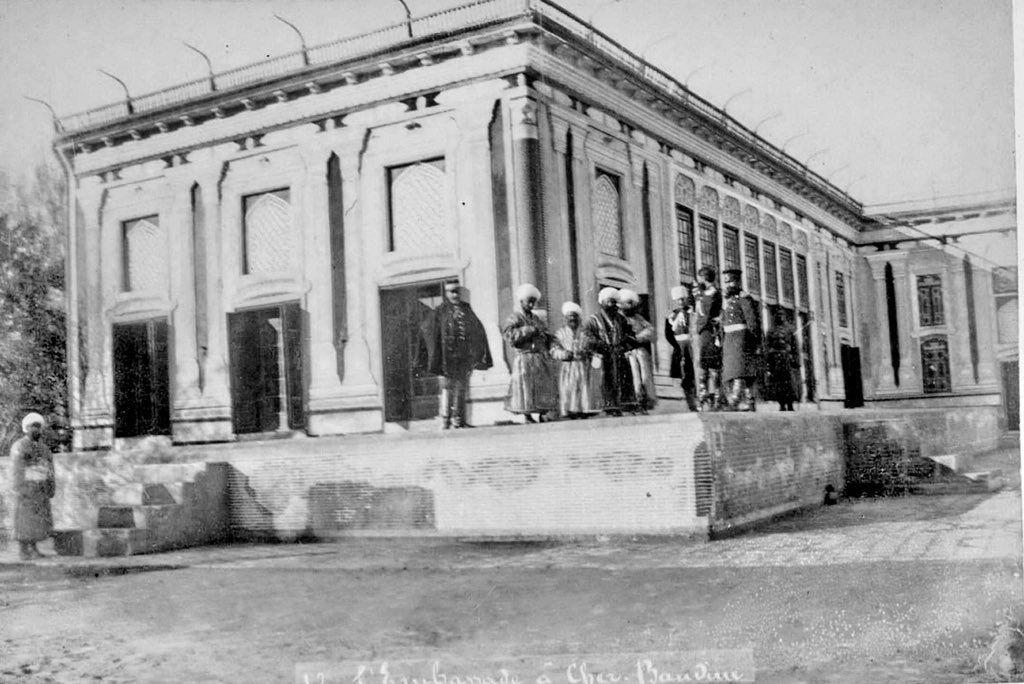
Shirbudun Palace

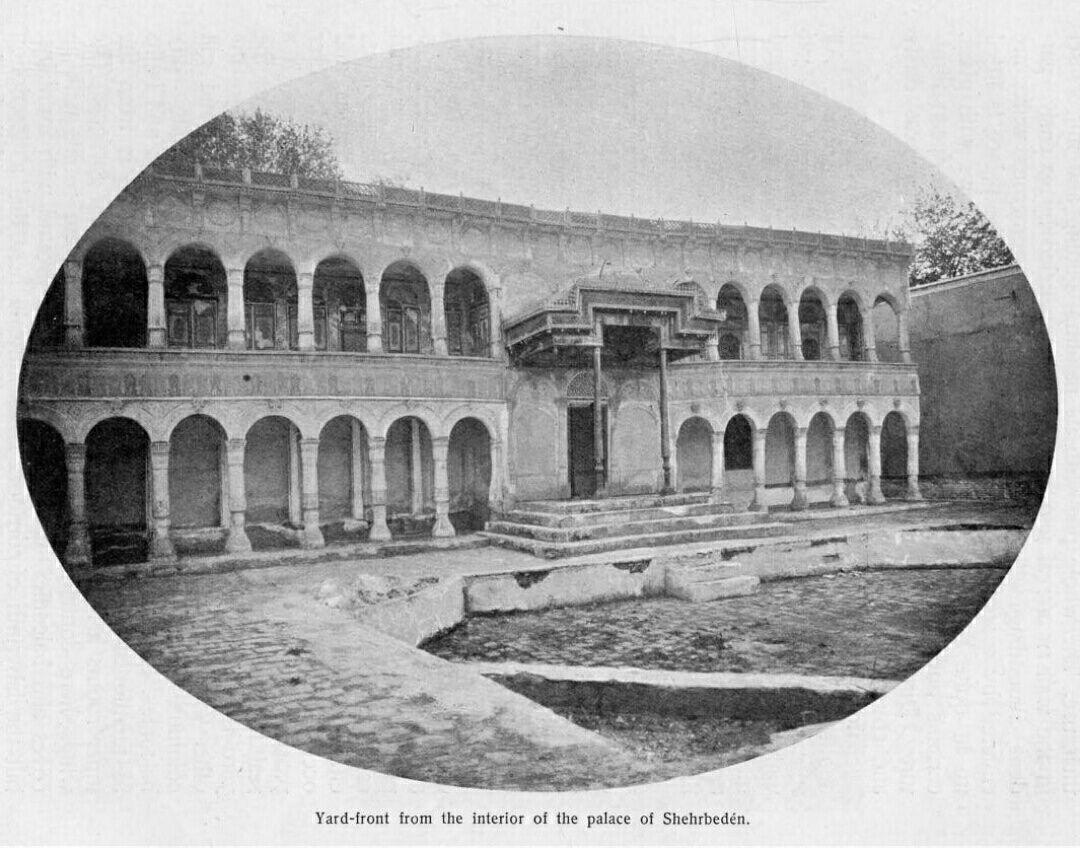
Shirbudun Palace

== Literature ==
=== Scientific literature ===
- Rempel L.I. Far and near. Tashkent: Publishing house of literature and art named after Gafur Gulam, 1981 - page 304.
- Sayfullayeva R, Mengliyev. Modern Uzbek literary language. Tashkent: Science and Technology, 2010 - 200 pages.
- Abdirashidov Z. Annotated bibliography of Turkestan materials in the newspaper Tarzhuman, Tokyo, 2011 - page 232.

=== Historical sources ===
- Mirza Salimbek. Tarikh-i Salimi (Source on the history of the Bukhara Emirate). Translation from Persian by N. K. Norkulov. Tashkent: Academy, 2009 - page 330.
- Muhammad Ali Baljuvani. The history is useless. Authors of translation from Tajik language, introduction and comments Sh. Vahidov, Z. Choriev.. Tashkent: Academy, 2001 - 122 pages.

=== Memories ===
- Shubinsky P.P. Essays on Bukhara. Historical Bulletin. Volume XLIX. St. Petersburg: St. Petersburg, 1892 - page 118.
- Dmitriev-Kavkazsky L.E. In Central Asia Notes of an Artist. St. Petersburg: Publications by A.F. Devriena, 1894 - 116 pages.
- Ole Olufsen, The Emir of Bokhara and his country; Journeys and studies in Bokhara (With a chapter on my voyage on the Amu darya to Khiva). Gyldendalske Boghanel, Nordisk Forlag Copenhagen London: William Heinemann, 1911 - page 599.
- Ainy S. Eight volumes of works Volume VII "Memories" Part IV. Translation from Tajik by Abdulla Khakimov. Tashkent: Literary publishing house, 1966 - 240 pages.

=== Scientific articles ===
- Mirza Abdulazim Sami. History of the Manghit Sultans or the Denial of the Bukhara Khanate. Translation from Persian-Tajik by Ilkhom Sultanov; Shark Star Magazine. Tashkent.
- Bagayev U. Shirbudun palace of Bukhara emir. "Journal of Lessons of Imam Bukhari". Tashkent.
