= Asiriy Madrasa =

Madrasa in Bukhara, Uzbekistan

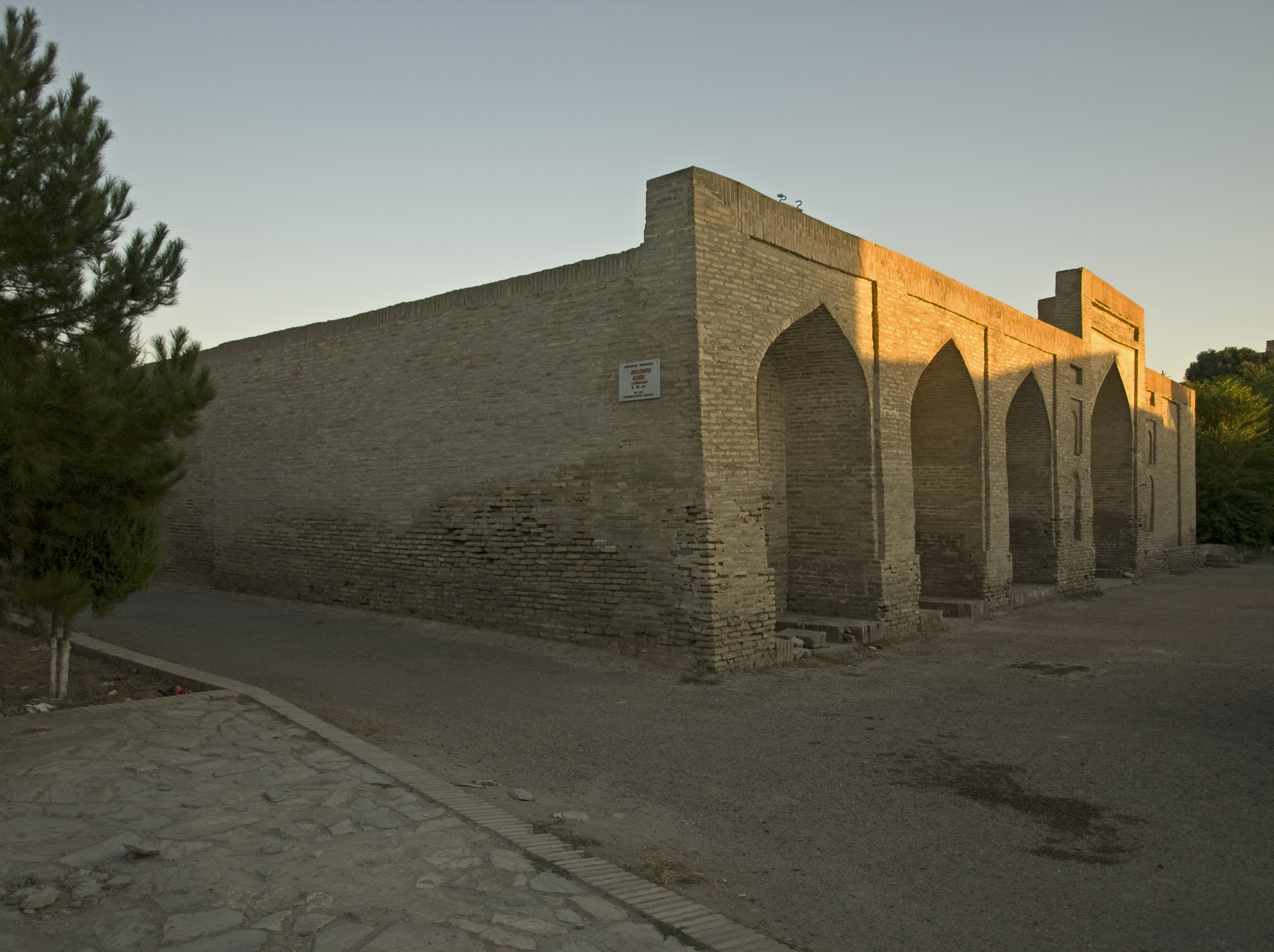
- Interactive map of the Asiriy Madrasa area

General information
- Architectural style: Islamic
- Location: Bukhara, Uzbekistan
- Coordinates: 39.7767°N 64.4139°E
- Year built: 16th century

Technical details
- Material: Brick

The Asiriy Madrasa (other names: Mavlono Asiriy Madrasa) is a one-story madrasa building located in the historical center of Bukhara city, Bukhara region, Republic of Uzbekistan. It is included in the national register of immovable property objects of Uzbekistan's material and cultural heritage.

Despite the allocation of funds for the restoration and repair of the madrasa according to the 2010 state program, it has remained in a dilapidated condition until now, half of it has been preserved and the other half has been destroyed. People have built houses instead of the collapsed part.

== History ==
The madrasa was built in the 16th century in the alley of Bukhara khanate's capital, later named Mavlono Asiriy, by the Uzbek ruler Abdullakhan (1557–1598), in exchange for the funds of the poet Mirzo Jalol Asir ibn Mirzo Momin Isfahani.

The waqf documents of the madrasa have reached us. It says:

His Excellency hoji ul-haramin hoji Muhammad Ali son of Mehtar Alibiy, his holiness Sayyid Abdul Muzaffar Subhonqulikhan Muhammad Bahodurkhan son of his holiness Abul Fath Sayyid Nadr Muhammadkhan, during the reign of the late mullah Asiriy, repaired the mosque-madrasa building that had fallen into ruin.

After the establishment of the Soviet rule, the teaching of students in the madrasa was stopped.

According to the State Program developed in 2010, the madrasa was planned to be examined, separated into emergency parts, structurally reinforced, built and restored in 2011, and 100 million sums were allocated for this purpose, but half of the madrasa that has been preserved until now has remained in a dilapidated condition. It has been ruined. People have built houses instead of the collapsed part.

The madrasa building, as an architectural monument of Bukhara city, was included in the national register of immovable property objects of Uzbekistan's material and cultural heritage, approved in 2019, and it is planned to be transferred to modern use as a tourist service object in the future.

It is located on Mirdostim street in Bukhara city.

== Architecture ==
The madrasa building is made of baked brick and has one floor. Its plan is polygonal.

== Legends ==
According to the legend, the construction of the madrasa is related to the name of the poet as-Sariy, who created his works in the Samanid period. However, according to the latest research, as-Sariy never came to Bukhara, moreover, he was not Asiriy, and the poet Asiriy (Mirzo Jalol Asiriy) was originally Iranian, came to Bukhara from Isfahan, lived and created his works in Bukhara during the reign of Abdullakhan (1557–1598) and built this madrasa.
