= Galaosiyo =

Galaosiyo Galaosiyo
- Town
- Location in Uzbekistan
- Coordinates: 39°51′00″N 64°27′00″E
- Country: Uzbekistan
- Region: Bukhara Region
- District: Bukhara District
- founded: 1982

Population (2016)
  - Total: 12,600
- Time zone: UTC+5 (UZT)
- Postcode: 200400
- Area code: (+998) 65
- Vehicle registration: 20 (previous to 2008); 80-84 (2008 and newer)

Galaosiyo (Uzbek: Galaosiyo, also Gala Osiyo, Russian: Галаасия) is a city and seat of Bukhara District in Bukhara Region in Uzbekistan. Its population is 12,600 (2016).
