= Qorovulbozor District =

Coordinates: 39°30′N 64°48′E

- District
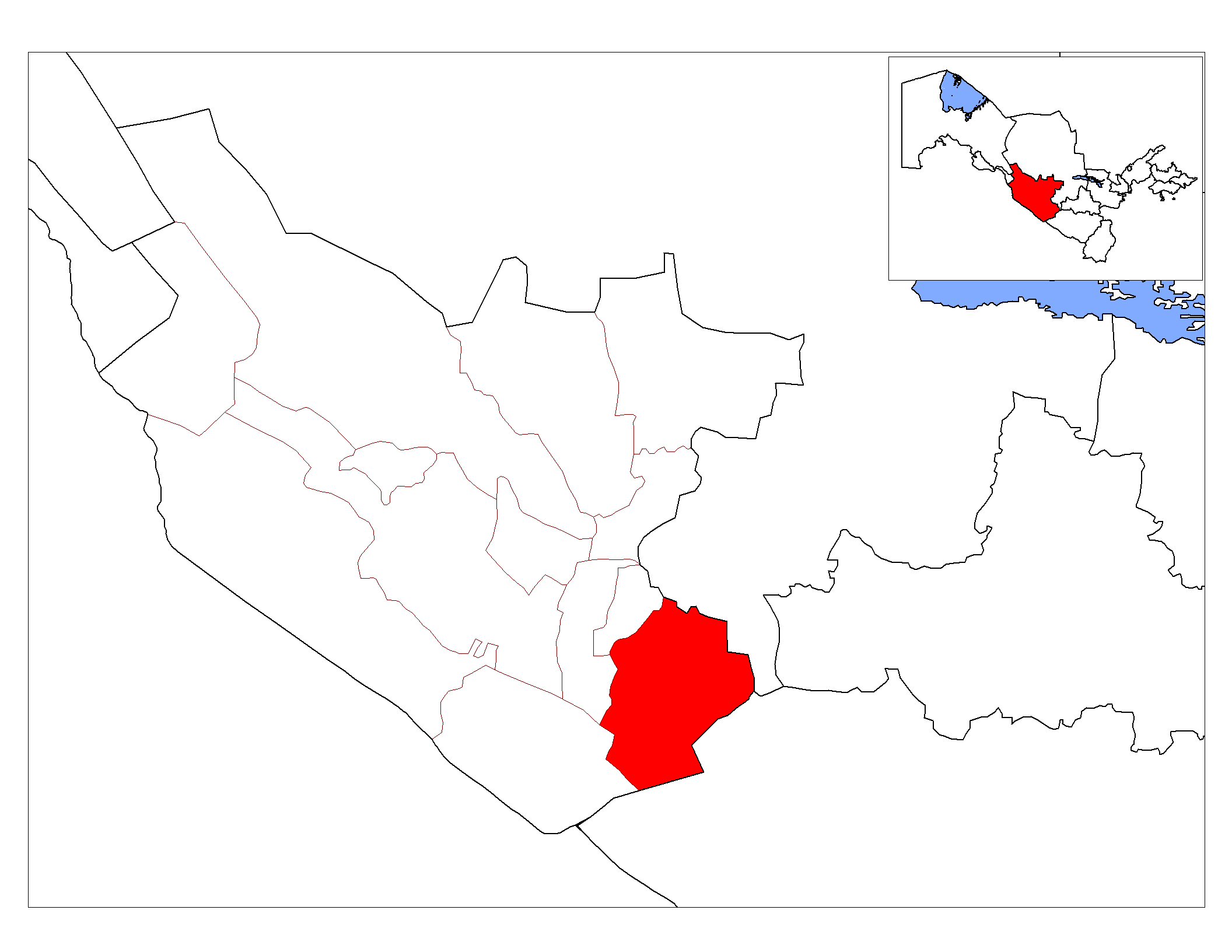
- Country: Uzbekistan
- Region: Bukhara Region
- Capital: Qorovulbozor

Area
  - Total: 2,200 km^{2} (850 sq mi)

Population (2021)
  - Total: 19,100
  - Density: 8.7/km^{2} (22/sq mi)
- Time zone: UTC+5 (UZT)

Qorovulbozor District (Uzbek: Qorovulbozor tumani) is a district of Bukhara Region in Uzbekistan. The capital lies at the city Qorovulbozor. It has an area of 2,200 km^{2} (850 sq mi) and its population is 19,100 (2021).

The district consists of 1 city (Qorovulbozor) and 4 rural communities (Navbahor, Bo'ston, Buzachi, Jarqoq).
