= Shofirkon District =

Coordinates: 40.124554°N 64.502449°E

- District
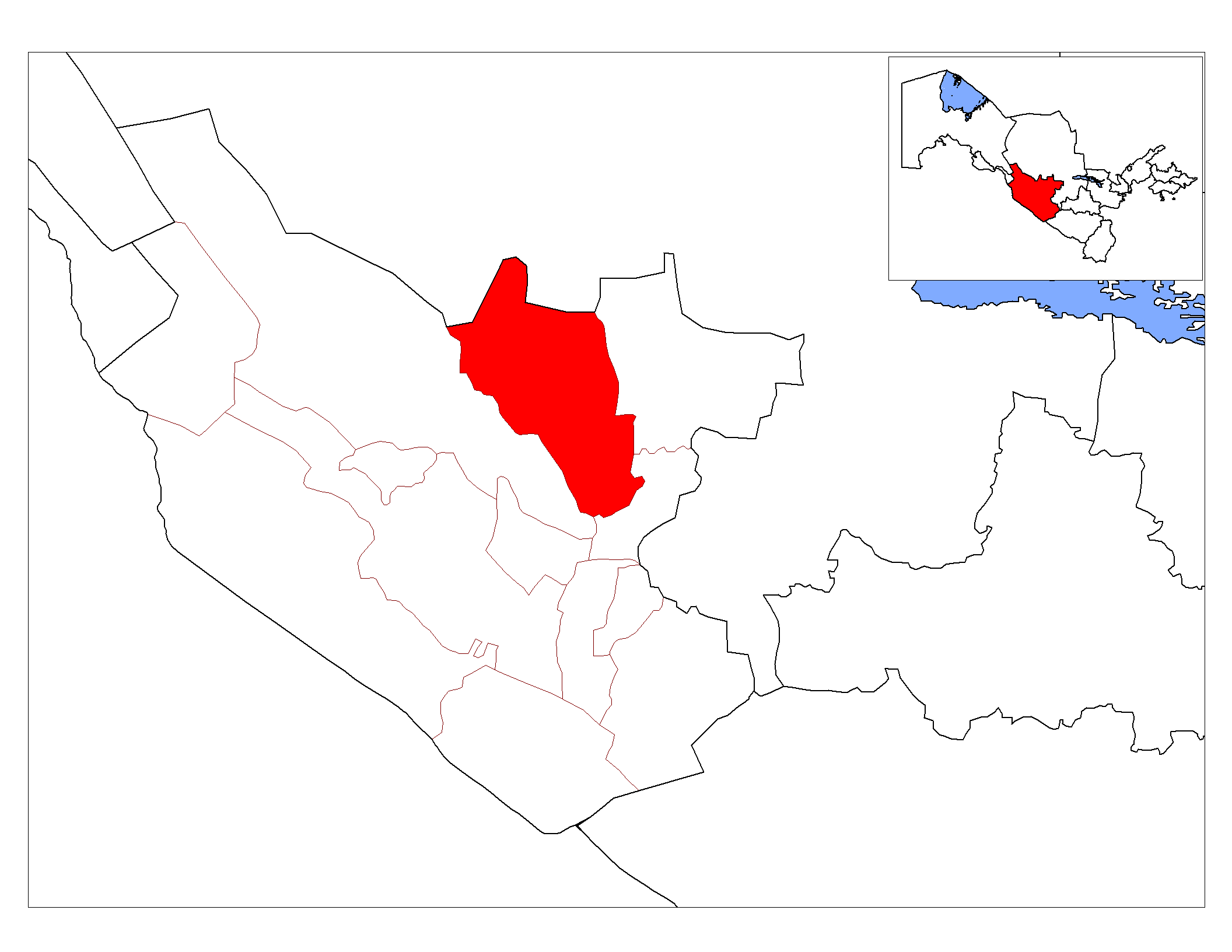
- Country: Uzbekistan
- Region: Bukhara Region
- Capital: Shofirkon

Area
  - Total: 3,720 km^{2} (1,440 sq mi)

Population (2021)
  - Total: 181,700
  - Density: 48.8/km^{2} (127/sq mi)
- Time zone: UTC+5 (UZT)

Shofirkon District is a district of Bukhara Region in Uzbekistan. The capital lies at the city Shofirkon. It has an area of 3,720 km^{2} (1,440 sq mi) and its population is 181,700 (2021).

The district consists of 1 city (Shofirkon), 8 urban-type settlements (Jo'yrabot, Iskogare, Quyi Chuqurak, Mirzoqul, Talisafed, Undare, Chandir, G'ulomte) and 12 rural communities (Vargonze, Denov, Joʻynav, Joʻyrabot, Doʻrmon, Savrak, Sulton Joʻra, Tezguzar, Mazlaxon chandir, Sh.Hamroyev nomli, Iskogare, Bogʻiafzal).

Shofirkon district was established on September 29, 1926. It is bordered by Vobkent district in the south, Peshko district in the south-west, Gijduvan district in the east, Navoiy region in the north.

The territory of the district consists mainly of plains and sand dunes. The southern part in the Zarafshan valley is irrigated. The climate is sharply continental. The average annual temperature is 14.2 °C, the July temperature is 29.4 °C. The annual precipitation is 220 mm.
