= Shofirkon =

Shofirkon Shofirkon
- City
- Location in Uzbekistan
- Coordinates: 40°07′N 64°30′E
- Country: Uzbekistan
- Region: Bukhara Region
- District: Shofirkon District
- Established: 1926

Population (2016)
  - Total: 14,000
- Time zone: UTC+5 (UZT)

Shofirkon (Uzbek: Shofirkon/Шофиркон, Persian: شاپورکام, Russian: Шафиркан) is a city and seat of Shofirkon District in Bukhara Region in Uzbekistan. The town population was 9,594 people in 1989, and 14,000 in 2016.

== History ==
Archaeological evidence suggests that the settlement on the territory of modern Shafirkan was founded in the early Middle Ages.

According to the Persian historiographer Narshakhi, the founder of the city was a Sassanid prince Shahpur, who lived in the 3rd century AD. Shahpur quarreled with his father, the then ruler of Persia, arrived in Bukhara, married the daughter of the ruler of Bukhara and received land as a gift in the floodplain of the Zarafshan River. He often hunted in these places, which he really liked. Here a canal was dug, called Shahpūrkām Persian: شاپورکام (Shāpūrkām) which means "As Desired by Shahpur" in Persian, and the Vardonze fortress was built in which Shahpur moved with his many retinue from Persia. Later, the fortress became the center of the state. The name Shā(h)pūrkām was then pronounced as Shafurkam by the locals and later as Shofirkon.

The importance of Shapūrkām as the center of the region increased after the fall of the value of the ancient city of Vardanzi in the 1860s.

In 1926, Shafirkan became the district center of the Bukhara region of Uzbekistan.

By a resolution of the Presidium of the Central Executive Committee of the USSR of March 7, 1933, a resolution was approved by the Central Executive Committee of the Uzbek SSR of November 3, 1932 on renaming the center of the Bauman district of the village of Khoja Arif to the village of Bauman.

The city has a pedagogical vocational college, a college of agriculture, an economic college, etc.

Currently, Shafirkan is a district center in the Bukhara region of the Republic of Uzbekistan. Representatives of various nationalities live here: Uzbeks, Tajiks, Russians, Turkmens, etc.
