= Jondor District =

Coordinates: 39°44′N 64°11′E

- District
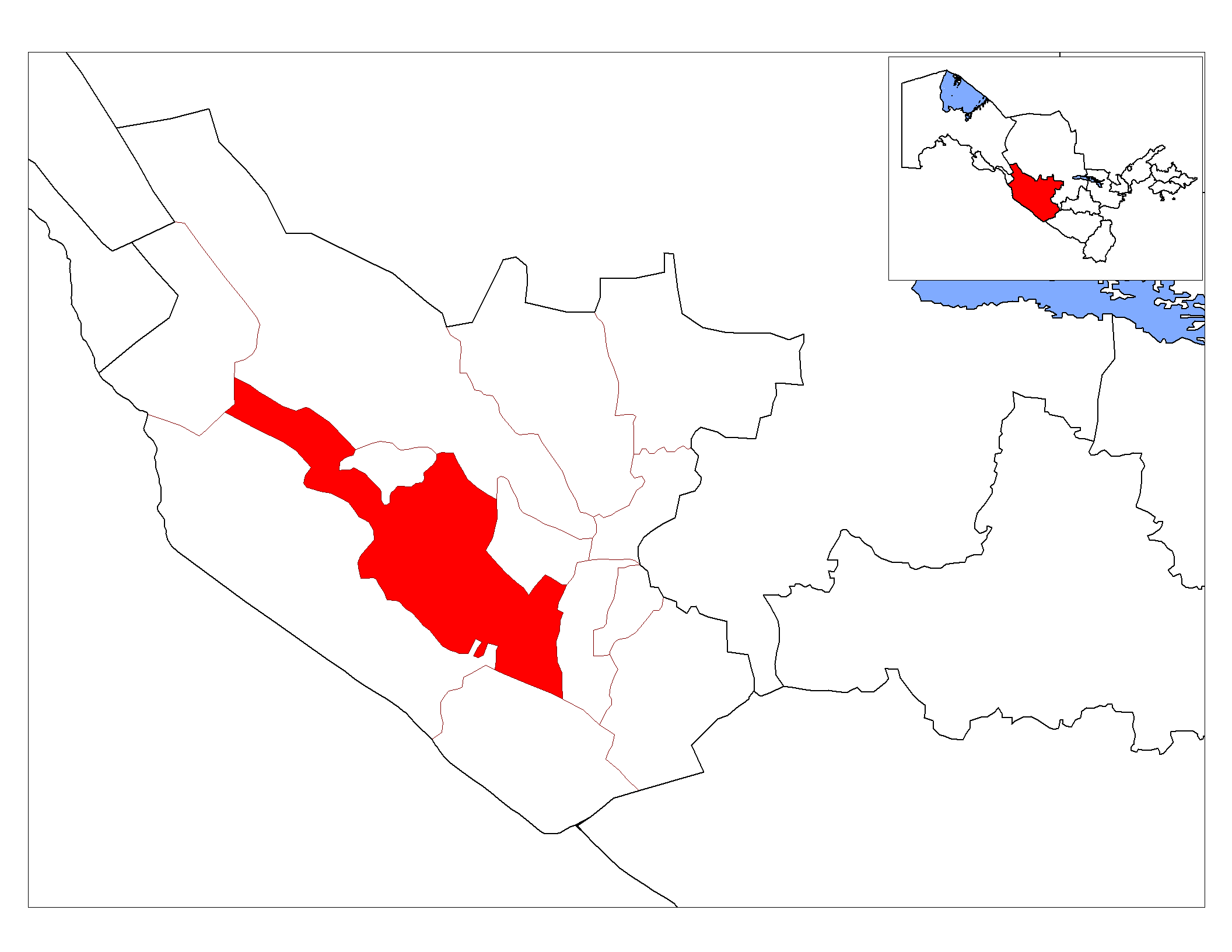
- Location in Bukhara Region
- Country: Uzbekistan
- Region: Bukhara Region
- Capital: Jondor

Area
  - Total: 5,170 km^{2} (2,000 sq mi)

Population (2021)
  - Total: 179,300
  - Density: 34.7/km^{2} (89.8/sq mi)
- Time zone: UTC+5 (UZT)

Jondor District is a district of Bukhara Region in Uzbekistan. The capital lies at the town Jondor. It has an area of 5,170 km^{2} (2,000 sq mi) and its population is 179,300 (2021).

The district consists of 9 urban-type settlements (Jondor, Paxlavon, Dalmun, Ko'liyon, Samonchuq, Tobagar, Ushot, Xazorman, Chorzona) and 13 rural communities (Dalmun, Qaroli, Lolo, Romish, Zarafshon, Oxshix, Xumdonak, Xumini bolo, Mustaqillik, Poʻloti, Samonchuq, Aleli, Mirzayon).

Jondor district was established on 17 January 1937. From 24 December 1962 it was part of Romitan and Bukhara districts. It was re-established on 9 January 1967. It is bordered by Olot and Qorakoʻl districts from south-west, with Bukhara, Romitan, Peshku districts from east and north-east. In Jondor district there are 4 historical monuments: Mahmud Torobiy's grave, Varaxsha memorial, Shahri Islom fortress, Qizbibi memorial complex.

== Nature ==
Jondor district is located at the Bukhara oasis, north-west of the lower reaches of the river Zeravshan, in the desert. The relief is mostly flat, partly marshy and salinisation. The rest of its territory is desert.
