= Ibrahim Akhund madrasah =

Madrasa in Bukhara, Uzbekistan

- Ibrohim oxund madrasasi
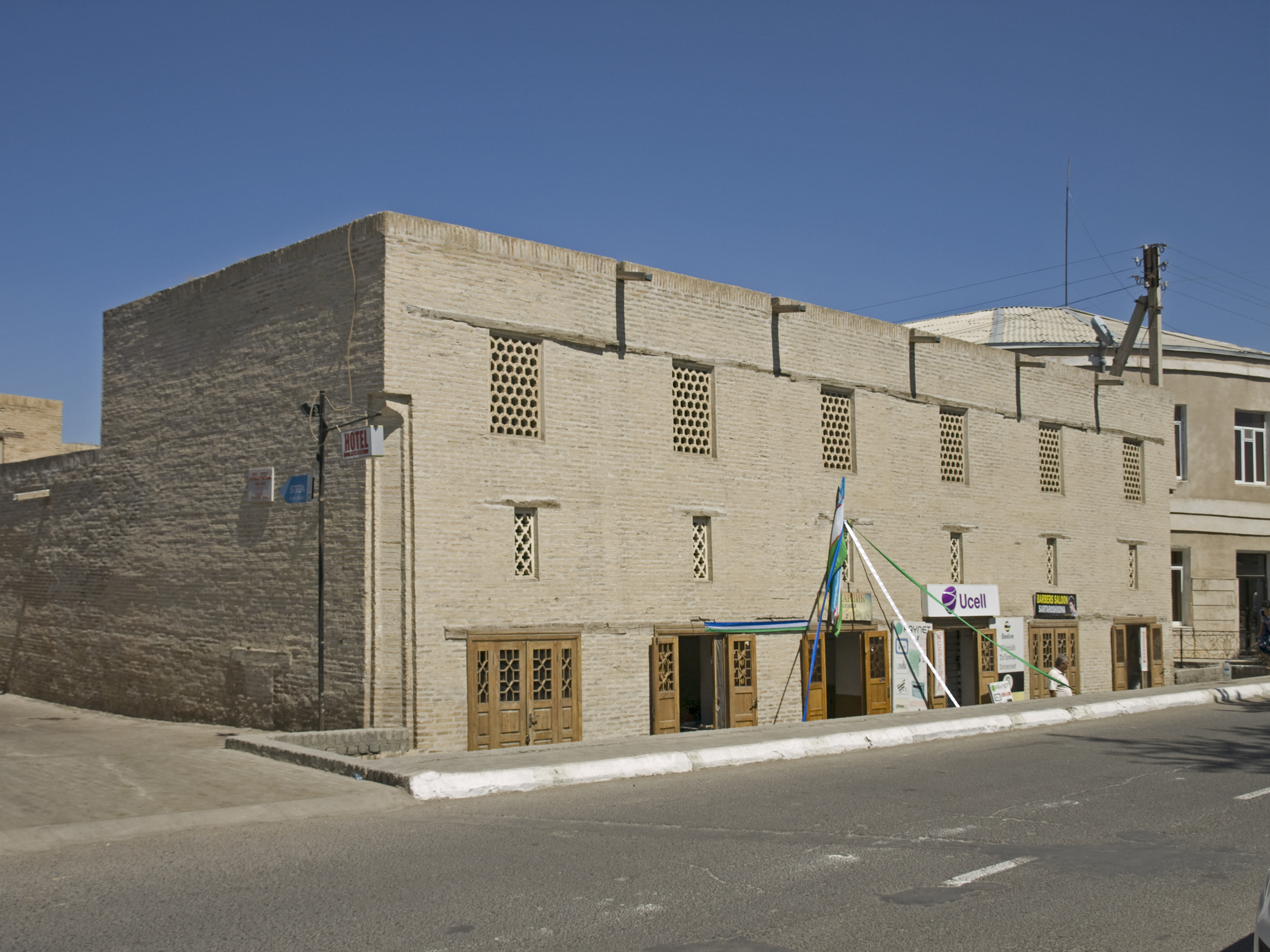
- Interactive map of the Ibrahim Akhund madrasah area

General information
- Status: under the protection of the state
- Type: Madrasah
- Architectural style: Central Asian architecture
- Location: Koʻkaldosh MFY, Mehtar Anbar Street, Bukhara Region, Uzbekistan
- Coordinates: 39°46′26″N 64°25′24″E
- Construction started: 1958
- Construction stopped: 1959
- Owner: State property. Bukhara Region Cultural Heritage Department on the basis of operational management rights

Technical details
- Material: baked bricks
- Size: 32 cells
- Floor count: two-storey

Website
- http://bukhara-museum.narod.ru/Russian/his4_0/his4_1_14.html

Ibrahim Akhund madrasah is a two-story madrasah located in the historical center of Bukhara city, Bukhara region, Republic of Uzbekistan. It is included in the national list of real estate objects of material and cultural heritage of Uzbekistan. The Varakhsha Archaeological Museum is in the building.

== History ==
The madrasah was built in 1858–1859 in the capital of Bukhara Emirate, Oybibi inaq (Oybinok), during the reign of the Uzbek ruler Nasrullah Khan(1827–1860), with the funds of Mulla Mir Ibrahim Kashgari (Ibrahim Akhund). It consisted of 32 rooms and 1 classroom. 1 bathroom in Toki Miyona district, 1 grocery store in Kokilai Khord Guzar, Khoja Muhammad Parron Guzar, a kovush dyeing palace, a grocery store with a bakery, two cooking shops and six brick shops were dedicated to the madrasah.

The endowment documents of the madrasah have reached us, and the document is confirmed by the seals of Amir Nasrullah Khan and Qazi ul-Quzzat Sufi Khoja ibn Akhund Amonullah Khoja.

After the establishment of Soviet rule the education of students in the madrasah was terminated.

In 1995 an exposition of the Varakhsha Archaeological Museum was organized in the madrasah, where you can familiarize yourself with the archaeological finds found in Varakhsha.

According to the state program developed in 2010, in 2011 it was planned to divide the madrasah into parts, structural strengthening, restoration and repair, adaptation to modern use, and 25 million soums were allocated for the implementation of these works.

The madrasah, as an architectural monument of the city of Bukhara, was included in the national list of immovable property objects of the material and cultural heritage of Uzbekistan approved in 2019[1], and is now put into modern use as a tourist service facility. The Varakhsha Archaeological Museum is located in the building.

It is in the street named after Mehtar Anbar belonging to Kokaldosh MFY in Bukhara.

== Architecture ==
The madrasah building is made of square bricks, has 2 floors, has 38 rooms. In the 19th century, it formed an independent architectural ensemble together with the Oybinok mosque and Muhammad Nabi madrasas.

== Literature ==
- Jumanazar A. (2017). Buxoro taʼlim tizimi tarixi. Toshkent: Akademnashr. p. 592. ISBN 978-9943-4728-2-2.
