= Xalfa Xudoydod Complex =

- Xalfa Xudoydod majmuasi
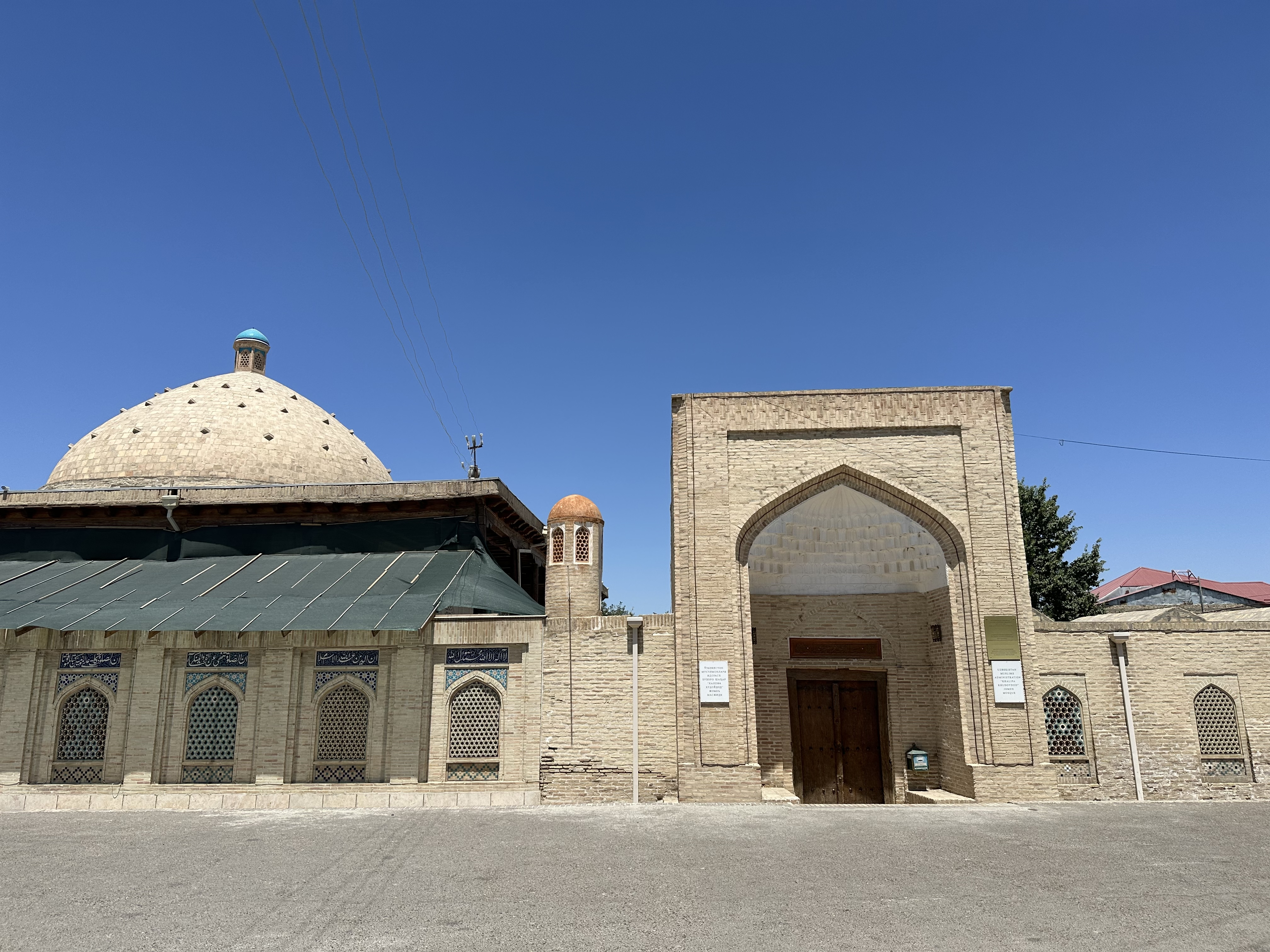
- The Xalfa Xudoydod Complex in Bukhara, Uzbekistan
- Interactive map of the Xalfa Xudoydod Complex area
- Etymology: Named after Shaykh Xudoydod ibn Toshmuhammad Azizon al-Bukhari, a Sufi leader and founder of the complex

General information
- Type: Religious and memorial complex
- Architectural style: Uzbek architecture of the 18th–19th centuries
- Location: Havzi Nav district, Bukhara, Xalifa Xudoydod ko’chasi, Bukhara, Uzbekistan
- Coordinates: 39.7689°N 64.4001°E
- Year built: 1777–1855
- Affiliation: Yassawiyya Sufi order

Technical details
- Material: Brick, wood, ganch

Design and construction
- Known for: Being an example of a complex that includes various religious and memorial structures

The Xalfa Xudoydod Complex is an architectural monument in Bukhara Region, Uzbekistan. The complex was built by Sheikh Xudoydod ibn Toshmuhammad Azizon al-Bukhari in 1777–1855, during the reign of the Manghit dynasty in Bukhara Emirate. The complex consists of a madrasa, a mosque, a house, a cistern and a cemetery.

== History ==
The Xalfa Xudoydod complex is located in the Havzi Nav district of Bukhara, and was founded by Xalfa Xudoydod. His full name is Shaykh Xudoydod ibn Toshmuhammad Azizon al-Bukhari. Xalfa Xudoydod was originally from Khorezm. According to the information in the "Tuhfat uz-zoirin" ("A Gift for the Pilgrims"), Xalfa Xudoydod bought 12 plots of land for this complex and built a khanqah, a madrasa, a cistern and an ablution room. There were previously the cemeteries of Eshoni Imlo and Xalfa Xudoydod in the area where the complex is located, but these cemeteries were destroyed during the Soviet years. Currently, a school and a preschool institution are operating in the place of these cemeteries. The entrance to the complex has two doors, with the main gate located on the western side. The complex has a central courtyard, with a small minaret on top of it. The minaret was used for calling to prayer. The madrasas have two-storey doors, and each room has 2-3 niches. The tomb of Xalfa Xudoydod is located in the eastern cell of the complex. There is also a cistern in the complex, with two entrance doors. There are 39 one-storey cells in the Xalfa Xudoydod complex. There is a mosque in the south-west of the monument. According to the sources, 150-200 students studied in the madrasa in this complex. A number of waqf documents of this complex have been preserved, which state that in 1797–1798, this area was the Boqi Muhammadxon orchard, and there were a mosque, a madrasa and a cistern, and they were endowed to the name of Xalifa Xudoydod.

== Architecture ==
The house is surrounded by one-storey cells on three sides. The mosque located in the south-west of the house is square-shaped, covered with a dome, and has a wooden-columned veranda on three sides, decorated with carved ganch ornaments, and the columns are adorned with carved patterns. The cistern is accessed through a staircase. The remains of arches have been preserved on the front side of the madrasa. The tomb of Xalfa Xudoydod is reached through the north-central part of the house, and there is a veranda with two columns and painted patterns near the tomb. The Xalfa Xudoydod complex is an example of a complex that includes various religious and memorial structures, and is characteristic of the architecture of the 18th–19th centuries in terms of its design and shape. The area of the mosque is 25 x 25.4 meters and there was an inscription on the mosque, but it has not been preserved to this day. There is a veranda on the north side of the mosque, and a lecture hall was also built in front of it. According to the historian Nasiruddin al-Hanafi's work "Tuhfat uz-zoirin" ("A Gift for the Pilgrims"), the Xalfa Xudoydod complex was built by Shaykh Xudoydod ibn Toshmuhammad Azizon al-Bukhari, a representative of the Yasawiyya Sufi order.

== Bibliography ==
- Bobojonov, Sh. (2017). Sharif shahar yodgorliklari (Buxoro tarixiy obidalariga sayohat) [Monuments of Sharif city (A tour of historical monuments of Bukhara)] (in Uzbek). Bukhara: Buxoro nashriyoti. p. 310.
- Baxromov, Q.; Shodiyeva, N. (2020). Buxoro tarixiy obidalari geografiyasi [Geography of historical monuments of Bukhara] (in Uzbek). Bukhara: Durdona nashriyoti. p. 124.
