= Qorovulbozor =

- City
- Location in Uzbekistan
- Coordinates: 39°30′N 64°48′E
- Country: Uzbekistan
- Region: Bukhara Region
- District: Qorovulbozor District

Population (2016)
  - Total: 9,200
- Time zone: UTC+5 (UZT)

Qorovulbozor (Uzbek: Qorovulbozor, Russian: Караулбазар) is a city and seat of Qorovulbozor District in Bukhara Region in Uzbekistan. Its population was 6,448 in 1989, and 9,200 in 2016.
