= Peshku District =

Coordinates: 40.039262°N 64.394174°E

Peshku District Peshku Tumani
- District
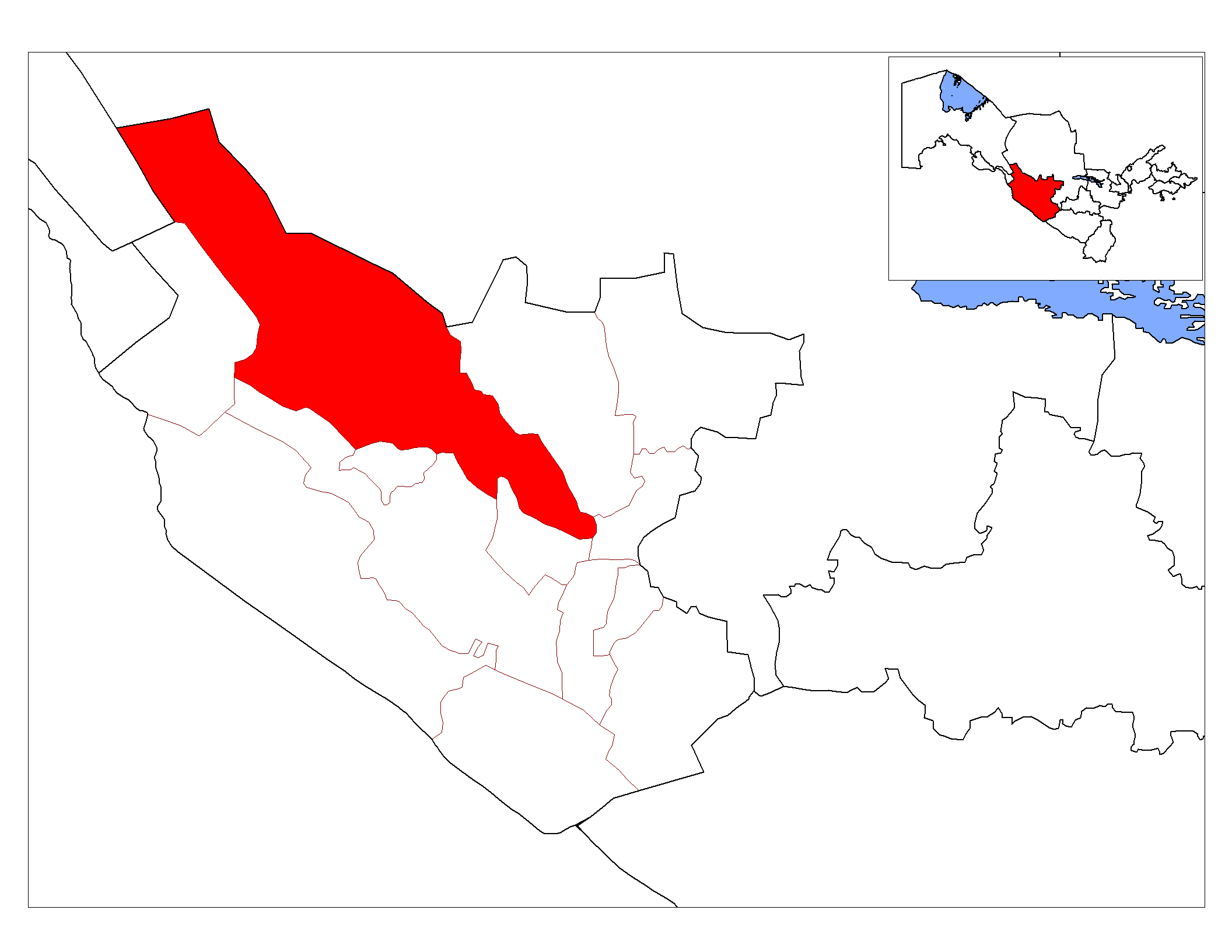
- Country: Uzbekistan
- Region: Bukhara Region
- Capital: Yangibozor

Area
  - Total: 8,720 km^{2} (3,370 sq mi)

Population (2021)
  - Total: 126,700
  - Density: 14.5/km^{2} (37.6/sq mi)
- Time zone: UTC+5 (UZT)
- Postal code: 201200
- Area code: 865

Peshku District (Uzbek: Peshku tumani) is a district of Bukhara Region in Uzbekistan. The capital lies at the town Yangibozor. Its population is 126,700 (2021). Its area is 8,720 km^{2} (3,370 sq mi).

The district consists of 4 urban-type settlements (Yangibozor, Peshku, Shavgon, Mahallai-Mirishkor) and 10 rural communities.
