= Bukhara District =

Coordinates: 39°51′N 64°26′E

- District
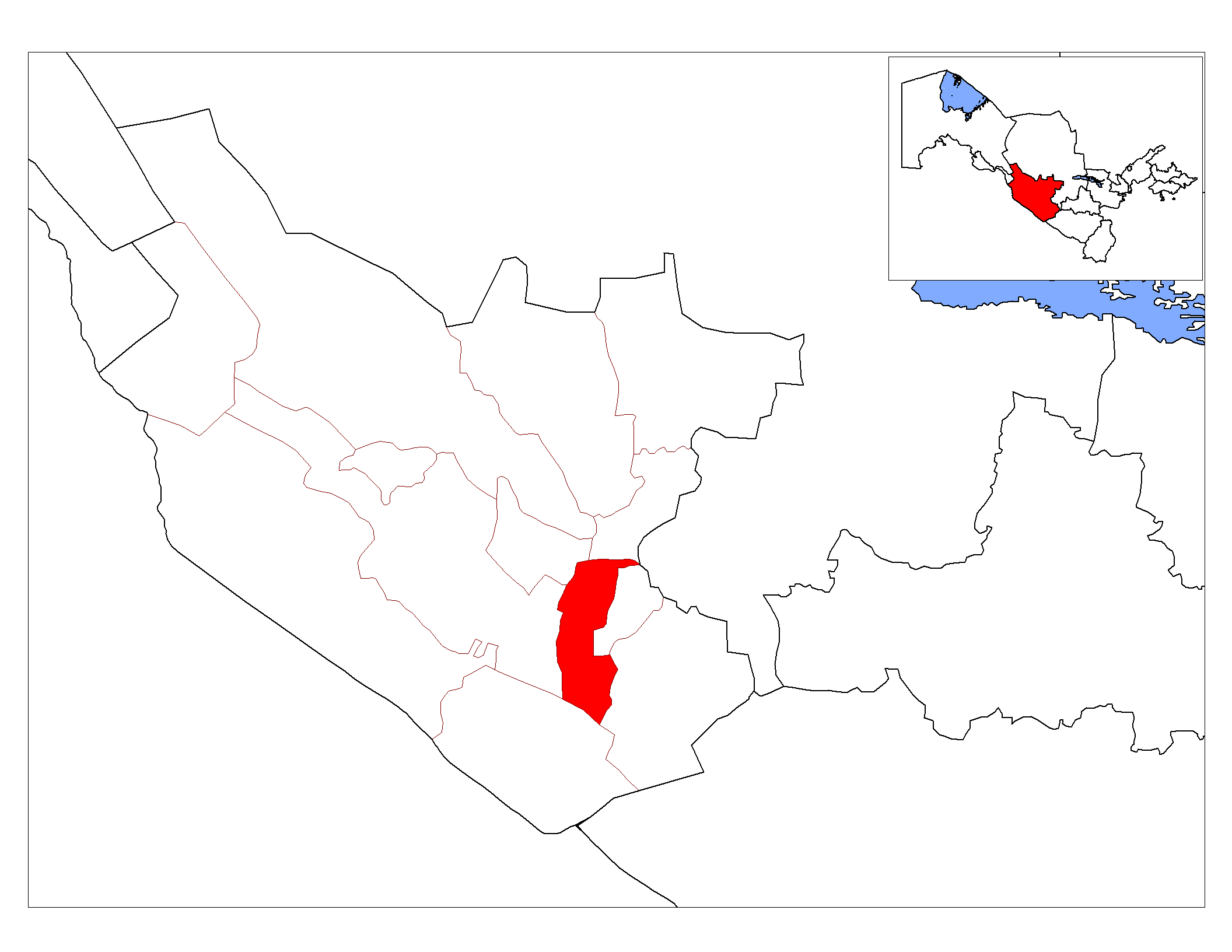
- Country: Uzbekistan
- Region: Bukhara Region
- Capital: Galaosiyo

Area
  - Total: 1,320 km^{2} (510 sq mi)

Population (2021)
  - Total: 172,200
  - Density: 130/km^{2} (338/sq mi)
- Time zone: UTC+5 (UZT)

Bukhara District (Uzbek: Buxoro tumani) is a district of Bukhara Region in Uzbekistan. The capital lies at the city Galaosiyo. It has an area of 1,320 km^{2} (510 sq mi) and its population is 172,200 (2021).

The district consists of 1 city (Galaosiyo), 6 urban-type settlements (Dexcha, Podshoyi, Rabotak, Oʻrta Novmetan, Xumini bolo, Arabxona) and 14 rural communities.
