= Jangy-Bazar =

Jangy-Bazar may refer to the following places in Kyrgyzstan:

- Jangy-Bazar, Jalal-Abad, a village in Chatkal District, Jalal-Abad Region
- Jangy-Bazar, Osh, a village in Nookat District, Osh Region
