= Romitan =

- City
- Location in Uzbekistan
- Coordinates: 39°56′N 64°23′E
- Country: Uzbekistan
- Region: Bukhara Region
- District: Romitan District

Population (2016)
  - Total: 14,300
- Time zone: UTC+5 (UZT)

Romitan (Uzbek: Romitan/Ромитан, Russian: Ромитан) is a city and seat of Romitan District in Bukhara Region in Uzbekistan. The town population was 9,636 people in 1989, and 14,300 in 2016.

== History ==
Archaeological evidence suggests that the settlement in what is now Romitan was founded before the Arab invasion.

Romitan has been mentioned in historical sources since the 10th century. It was a part of the Samanid state. The historian of the 10th century Narshakhi, calling it Ramtin, reports the following data:

Ramtin (and now exists near Bukhara, but is called Ramitan) has a large fortress; it is a fortified village. It is older than Bukhara and in some books it is even mentioned under the name of Bukhara.

Ramtin had been the residence of tsars since ancient times, and when the city of Bukhara was founded, the tsars began to spend only winter in this village. In the Muslim era the same thing continued.

Abu Muslim, — may God's mercy be upon him, — reached this place and lived in Ramtin, and this village was founded by Afrasiyab, who always stayed only in Ramtin when visiting Bukhara.

Persian books say that Afrasiyab lived 2000 years and was a magician. He belonged to the offspring of King Nuh. Afrasiyab killed his son-in-law Siyâvash, and Siyâvash had a son, Kay Khosrow.

In order to avenge the murder of his father, Kay Khosrow came to the area with a large army. Afrasiyab hastened to fortify the village.

Ramtin withstood the siege of the village by the troops of Kay Khosrow for two years. Against Ramtin, Kay Khosrow also built a village and named it Ramush.

This name was given to this village because of the beauty of its location. This village is still inhabited. In the village of Ramush, Kay Khosrow built a temple of fire-worshippers; the magicians say that this temple is older than the temples of Bukhara.

Kay Khosrow, after a two-year siege, captured the city of Afrasiyab and killed him himself... Muhammad, son of Jafar, says that 3,000 years have passed since that time. God knows better!
