= Gazli, Uzbekistan =

Gazli Gazli
- Location in Uzbekistan
- Coordinates: 40°07′52″N 63°27′22″E
- Country: Uzbekistan
- Region: Bukhara Region
- District: Romitan District
- Established: 1958
- Elevation: 186 m (610 ft)

Population (2016)
  - Total: 8,100
- Time zone: UTC+5 (UZT)

Gazli (Uzbek: Gazli / Газли) is a city in Bukhara Region, Uzbekistan. It is part of Romitan District. Its population was 8,200 in 2001, and 8,100 in 2016.
