= Yangibozor, Bukhara Region =

Urban-type settlement in Bukhara Region, Uzbekistan

Yangibozor Yangibozor
- urban-type settlement
- Location in Bukhara
- Coordinates: 40°02′0″N 64°23′30″E
- Country: Uzbekistan
- Region: Bukhara Region
- District: Peshku District
- Urban-type settlement status: 2012

Government
  - Type: Tuman
  - Hokim: Qodirov Olim Zoirovich

Population (2016)
  - Total: 7,100
- Time zone: UTC+5 (UZT)
- Postal code: 201200
- Area code: 998 6535
- Website: peshku.buxoro.uz

Yangibozor (Uzbek: Yangibozor, Янгибозор, Russian: Янгибазар) is an urban-type settlement and seat of Peshku District in Bukhara Region in Uzbekistan. It was established on 15 April 1950. Its population was 4,426 in 1989, and 7,100 in 2016. Center of Yangi Bozor is situated in street Chiqirchi. There are two colleges Vocational and Industrial colleges.
