= Romitan District =

Coordinates: 39°55′48″N 64°22′48″E

- District
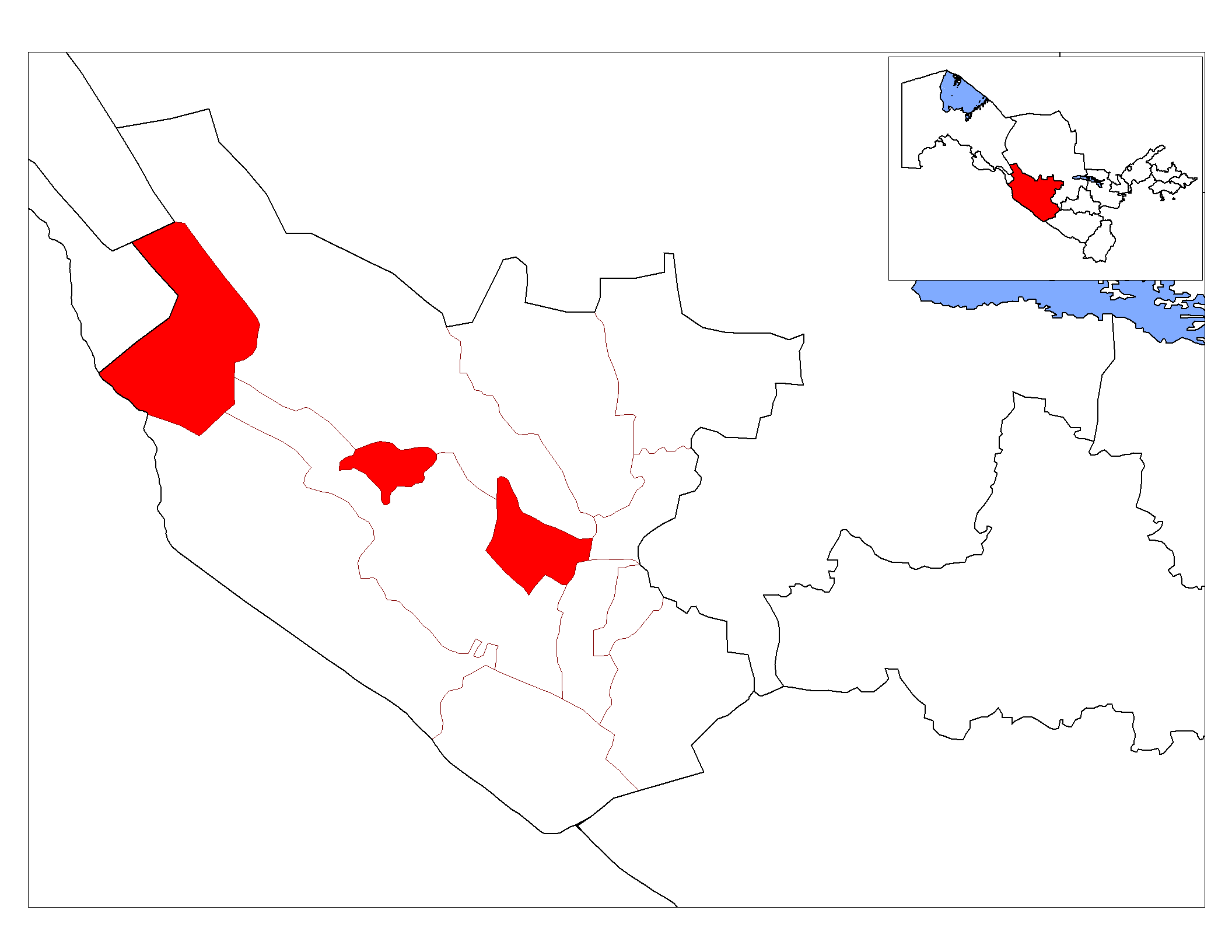
- Country: Uzbekistan
- Region: Bukhara Region
- Capital: Romitan

Area
  - Total: 2,450 km^{2} (950 sq mi)

Population (2021)
  - Total: 146,300
  - Density: 59.7/km^{2} (155/sq mi)
- Time zone: UTC+5 (UZT)

Romitan District (Uzbek: Romitan tumani) is a district of Bukhara Region in Uzbekistan. The capital lies at the city Romitan. It has an area of 2,450 km^{2} (950 sq mi) and its population is 146,300 (2021).

The district consists of 2 cities (Romitan, Gazli), 3 urban-type settlements (Qoqishtuvon, Xosa, Yuqori G'azberon) and 6 rural communities (Bogiturkon, Kurgan, Kyzylarvat, Romitan, Chilangu, Shurcha).
