= Bukhara Region =

Region of Uzbekistan

Bukhara Region Buxoro viloyati Бухоро вилояти (Uzbek)
- Region
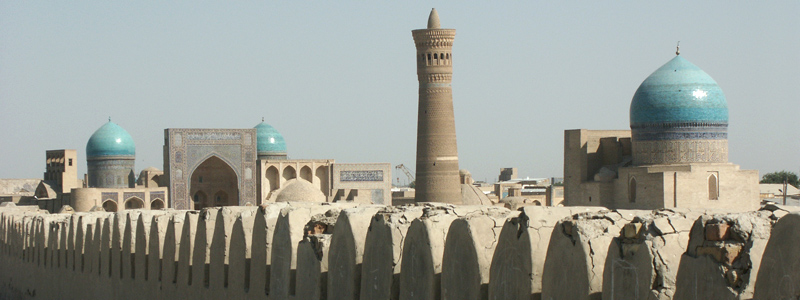
- The City of Bukhara

- Bukhara in Uzbekistan
- Coordinates: 40°10′N 63°40′E
- Country: Uzbekistan
- Established: 1938
- Capital: Bukhara

Government
  - Governor: Botir Zaripov

Area
  - Total: 40,216 km^{2} (15,527 sq mi)
- Elevation: 206 m (676 ft)

Population (2026)
  - Total: 2,107,035
  - Density: 52.393/km^{2} (135.70/sq mi)
- Time zone: UTC+5 (East)
  - Summer (DST): UTC+5 (not observed)
- ISO 3166 code: UZ-BU
- Districts: 11
- Cities: 11
- Townships: 3
- Villages: 121
- Website: buxoro.uz

Bukhara Region (Note: Uzbek: Бухоро вилояти, romanized: Buxoro viloyati, IPA: [bʊχɔˈrɔ ʋɪ̆lɔˌjæˈtʰɪ̆]; Tajik: вилояти Бухоро, romanized: viloyati Buxoro, Bukharian dialect: בלאיתי בּוכארא; Turkmen: Бухара велаяты, romanized: Buhara welaýaty; Karakalpak: Бухара уәлаяты, romanized: Buxara wálayatı) (Note: Formerly called Bukhara Oblast (from Russian Бухарская область).) is a region of Uzbekistan located in the southwest of the country. The Kyzyl Kum desert takes up a large portion of its territory. It borders Turkmenistan, Navoiy Region, Qashqadaryo Region, a small part of the Xorazm Region, and the Karakalpakstan Republic. It covers an area of 40,216 km^{2}. The population is estimated at 2,107,035 as of (2026). Buxoro Region is divided into 11 administrative districts and two district-level cities. The capital is Bukhara, with a population of around 305,500 (as of 2026).

The climate is a typically arid continental climate.

The old city of Bukhara is a UNESCO World Heritage Site, famous as a "living museum" and a center for international tourism. There are numerous historical and architectural monuments in and around the city and adjacent districts.

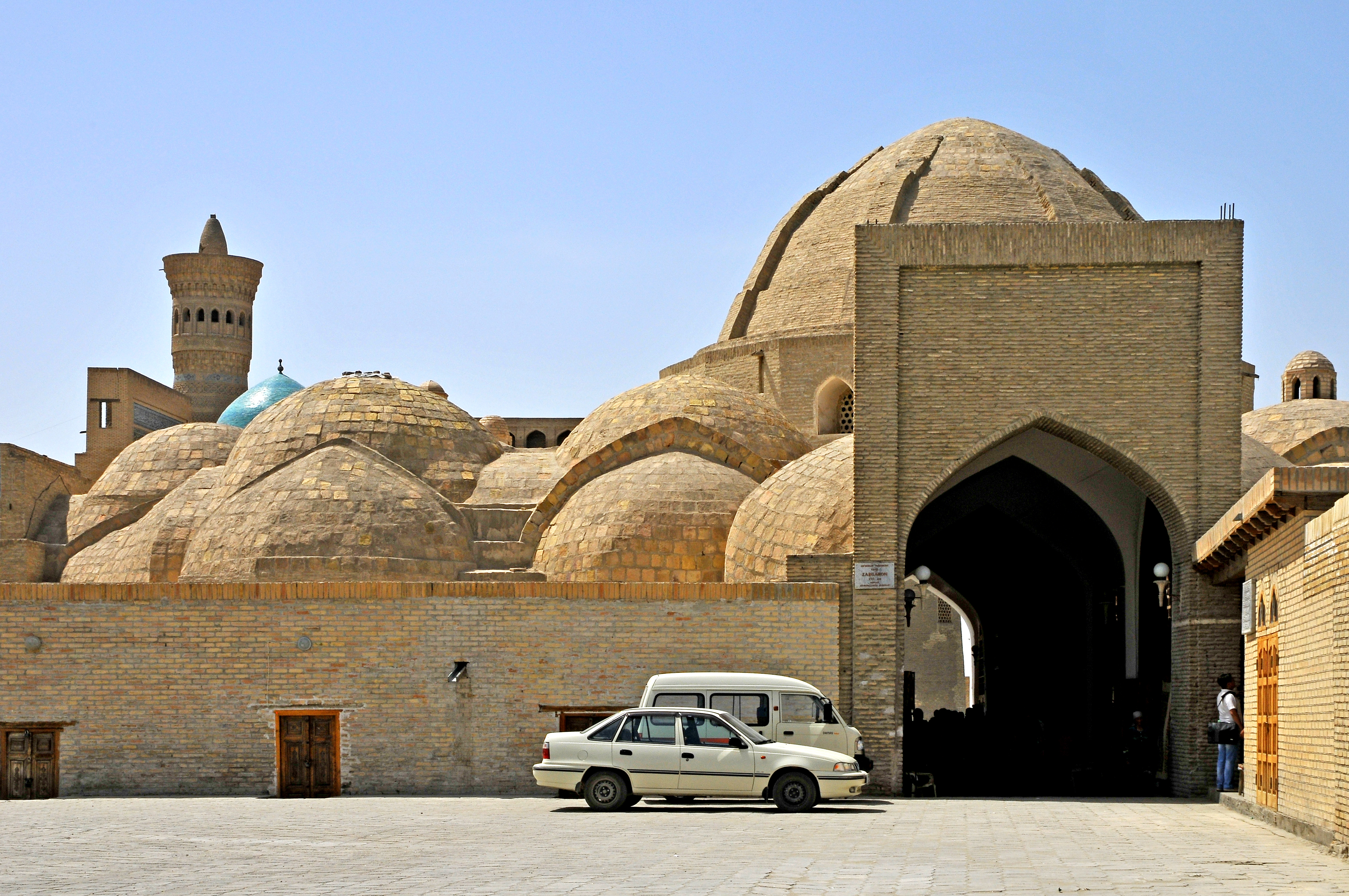
Tok-i-Zargoron Bazaar

The Bukhara Region has significant natural resources, especially natural gas, petroleum, graphite, bentonite, marble, sulfur, limestone, and raw materials for construction. The most developed industrial activities are oil refining, cotton ginning, textiles, and other light industry. Traditional crafts such as gold embroidery, ceramics, and engraving have been revived. Bukhara Region is the center of karakul sheep breeding and the production of karakul pelts in Uzbekistan.

== Administrative divisions ==
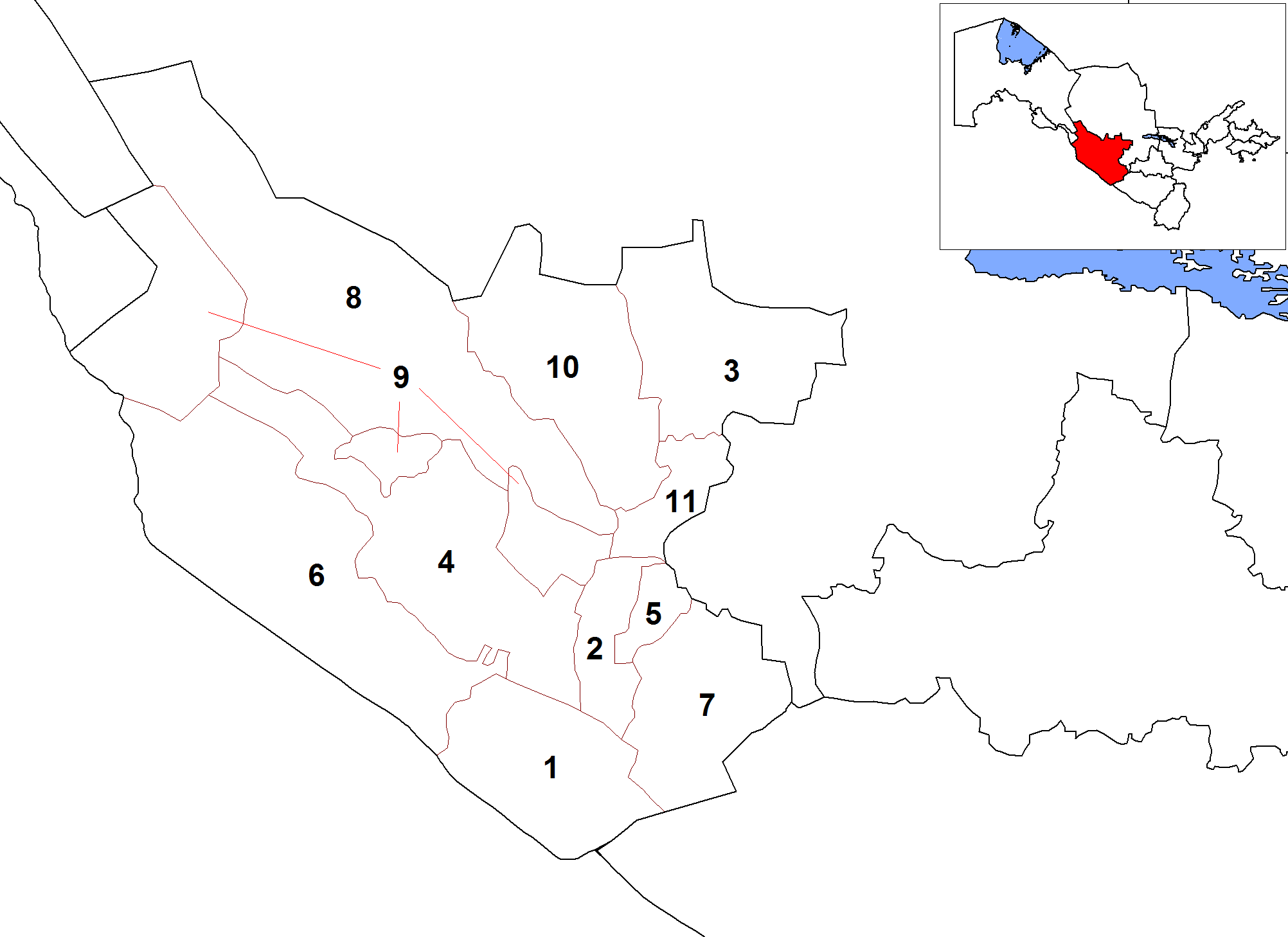
Districts of Bukhara

The Bukhara Region consists of 11 districts (listed below) and two district-level cities: Bukhara and Kogon.

City of Bukhara includes the municipality of Bukhara itself, as well as two rural communities (Otbozor, Shirbuddin).

Key	District name	District capital
1	Olot District	Olot
2	Bukhara District	Galaosiyo
3	Gʻijduvon District	Gʻijduvon
4	Jondor District	Jondor
5	Kogon District	Kogon
6	Qorakoʻl District	Qorakoʻl
7	Qorovulbozor District	Qorovulbozor
8	Peshku District	Yangibozor
9	Romitan District	Romitan
10	Shofirkon District	Shofirkon
11	Vobkent District	Vobkent

There are 11 cities (Bukhara, Kogon, Olot, Galaosiyo, Vobkent, Gʻijduvon, Qorakoʻl, Qorovulbozor, Romitan, Gazli, Shofirkon) and 68 urban-type settlements in the Bukhara Region.

== History ==
The Bukhara region has always been ethnically diverse in origin, mainly populated by Uzbeks and Tajiks. Other notable minorities of the region include the Bukharan Jews and the Iranis (Persian-speaking Shia descendants of residents of Merv expelled in late 18th century). Since the dissolution of the Soviet Union, the great majority of the Bukharan Jewish community have immigrated to Eretz Israel or to the United States while others have immigrated to Europe or Australia. The Iranis, despite sharing the Persian language with much of the residents of Bukhara region, have not assimilated into the Sunni majority population. Intermarriage between Iranis and Tajiks/Uzbeks have been rare.

== Main sights ==
Ulugbek Madrasah is a memorial to Abdul Khaliq Ghijduwani, located in the city of Gijduvon in the Bukhara region of Uzbekistan. It is one of the ancient and renowned madrasas of Bukhara, also known as the "Fayziya Madrasah." Presently, it is also referred to as the Mirzo Ulugbek Madrasa. This prestigious educational institution was built in the Hijri year 836 (corresponding to 1432/33 in the Gregorian calendar) beside the grave of Shaykh Abdul Khaliq Ghijduwani, with a two-story structure made of baked bricks. The Ulugbek Madrasah, established by Ulugh Beg, is the third and last madrasa he founded, relatively smaller and simpler compared to the Ulugbek Madrasah in Bukhara and Samarkand. Xalfa Xudoydod Complex is a late 18th–19th century religious‑memorial ensemble in the Havzi Nav district of Bukhara.
