= List of Safavid grand viziers =

Grand vizier of Safavid Iran
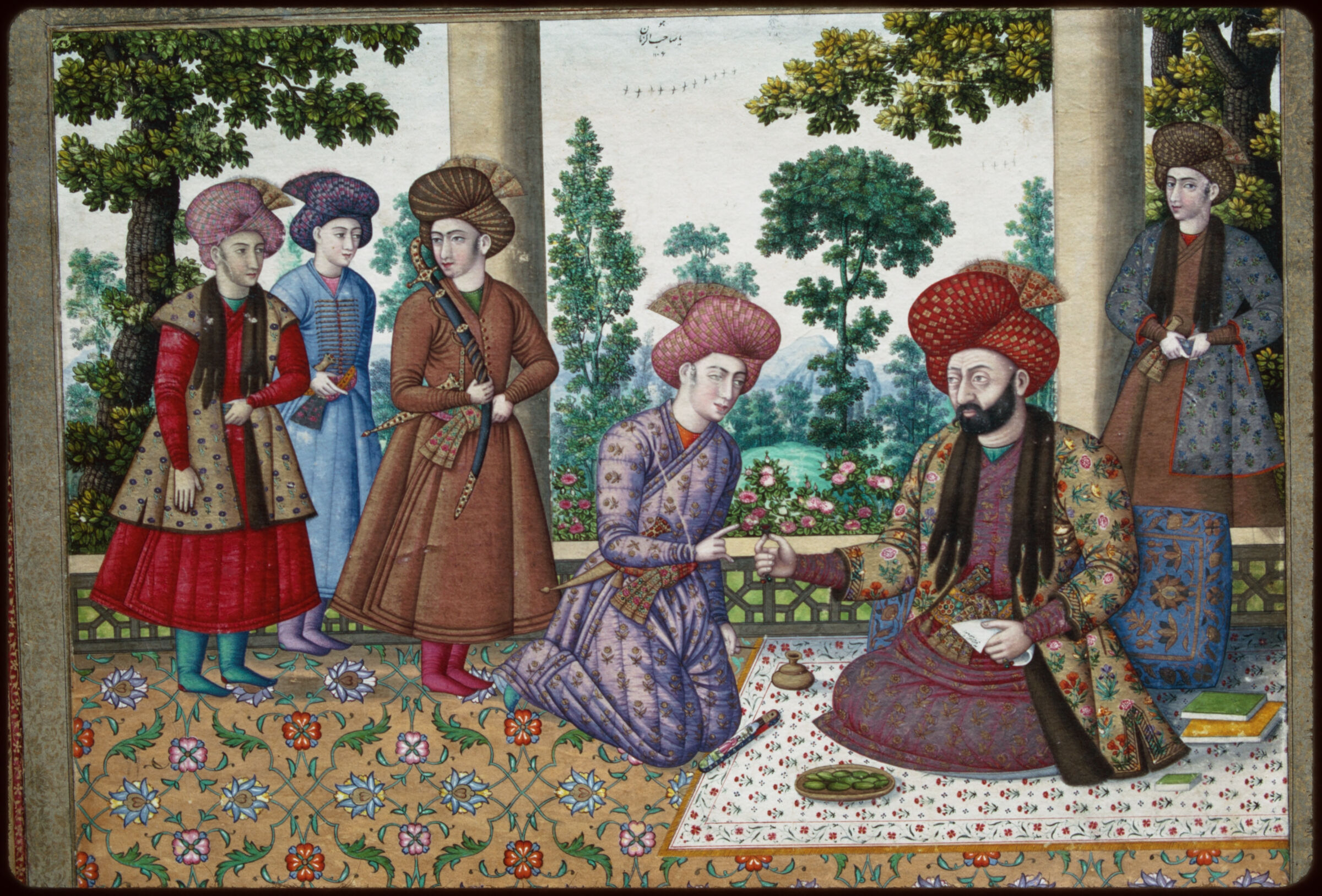
- The grand vizier Shahqoli Khan Zanganeh presents a ring to a young courtier, dated 1694/95
- Appointer: The shah
- Formation: 1501
- First holder: Amir Zakariya
- Final holder: Rajab-Ali Khan
- Abolished: 8 March 1736

The grand vizier (Persian: وزیر اعظم, romanized: vazir-e a'zam) was one of the highest ranking offices in Safavid Iran. From at least the tenure of Mirza Shah Hossein, they held the honorific title of E'temad ol-Dowleh.

During the 16th century, the authority of the grand vizier was a reflection of the shah’s own authority. Grand viziers held less prominence during the early Safavid era, as shahs like Shah Tahmasp I (r. 1524–1576) and Shah Abbas I (r. 1587–1629) were more engaged in the administration. The Turkmen Qizilbash leaders also held a level of influence that limited the authority of the grand vizier during the majority of the 16th century.

From the 16th late century onward, other prominent members of the court limited the power of the grand vizier, such as the steward of the royal court (nazer-e boyutat), the secretary-general of the royal secretariat (nazer-e daftar-e homayun), the treasurer-general (mostowfi ol-mamalek), the military commanders, or by one or more of the shah's favorites, as well as members of the harem. Nevertheless, the shah's patronage could elevate the grand vizier above all opposition, ensuring his command over the court uncontested.

The power of the grand vizier increased substantially in the 17th century as a result of the diminished authority of the Qizilbash leaders and the more fragmented and scattered makeup of the ruling class (Tajiks, eunuchs, royal women, gholams, and Qizilbash). From 1669 onwards, the grand vizier was usually from a tribal (Kurdish or Turkmen) background. With their entry to the office, the Qizilbash thus regained some of their lost authority. This entry to a Tajik-only office was due to the grand vizier's rise to prominence as the undisputed head of the central bureaucracy. The Qizilbash had by now accepted to share authority with the gholams and had been integrated into the Safavid bureaucracy. It also demonstrated how the Turkmens successfully assimilated into Persian administrative culture. Aside from their various talents, grand viziers were primarily selected for their administrative skills.

The grand vizier was the head of the royal council, the highest governing authority in the government.

== List of grand viziers ==
Name(s)	Date	Family/Tribe	Monarch
Amir Zakariya	1501–1507	Kujuji family	Ismail I
Mahmud Jan Daylami	1502/3–1507	Daylami family	Ismail I
Najm-e Sani	1508–1510	Khuzani family	Ismail I
Aqa Kamal al-Din Hossein Monshi Qomi	1509–1514		Ismail I
Mirza Shah Hossein	1514–1523		Ismail I
Jalal al-Din Mohammad Tabrizi	1523–1524	Kujuji family	Ismail I, Tahmasp I
Qadi Jahan Qazvini	1524		Tahmasp I
Mirza Jafar Savaji	1525–1531	Savaji family	Tahmasp I
Ahmad Beg Nur Kamal	1531–1533/34	Nur Kamaliya family	Tahmasp I
Khvajeh Sa'd al-Din Enayat Khuzani & Khvajeh Mo'en Yazdi	1534–1535	Khuzani family (Sa'd al-Din Enayat only)	Tahmasp I
Khvajeh Sa'd al-Din Enayat Khuzani & Qadi Jahan Qazvini	1535	Khuzani family (Sa'd al-Din Enayat only)	Tahmasp I
Qadi Jahan Qazvini	1535–1551		Tahmasp I
Khvajeh Amir Beg Mohrdar, Khvajeh Ghayath al-Din Ali & Aqa Mohammad Farahani Kajaji	1551	Kujuji family (Khvajeh Amir Beg only)	Tahmasp I
Mirza Beg Sabaqi Abhari & Khvajeh Seif al-Moluk Tehrani	1552–1553		Tahmasp I
Masum Beg Safavi	1553–1568	Sheykhavand family	Tahmasp I
Emir Sayyed Sharif-e Sani	1568–1569		Tahmasp I
Mir Sayyed Hossein Farahani & Khvajeh Kamal al-Din Ali	1573–1574		Tahmasp I
Mirza Shokrollah Isfahani	1576		Ismail II
Mirza Salman Jaberi	1577–1583	Jaberi Ansari family	Ismail II, Mohammad Khodabanda
Mirza Hedayatollah	1583–1586	Khuzani family	Mohammad Khodabanda
Mirza Mohammad Monshi	1586	Kujuji family (maternal side)	Mohammad Khodabanda
Mirza Shah Vali	1587	Khuzani family	Abbas I
Mirza Lotfi	1587		Abbas I
Mirza Mohammad Monshi	1588	Kujuji family (maternal side)	Abbas I
Mirza Lotfollah Shirazi	1589–1591		Abbas I
Hatem Beg Ordubadi	1591–1610	Ordubadi family	Abbas I
Mirza Taleb Khan Ordubadi	1610–1621	Ordubadi family	Abbas I
Salman Khan Ustajlu	1621–1624	Ustajlu tribe	Abbas I
Khalifeh Soltan	1624–1632	Khalifeh family	Abbas I, Safi
Mirza Taleb Khan Ordubadi	1632–1634	Ordubadi family	Safi
Saru Taqi	1634–1645		Safi, Abbas II
Khalifeh Soltan	1645–1654	Khalifeh family	Abbas II
Mohammad Beg	1654–1660		Abbas II
Mirza Mohammad Karaki	1661–1669	Karaki family	Abbas II, Suleiman I
Shaykh Ali Khan Zanganeh	1669 – March 1673	Zangana tribe	Suleiman I
Vacant	March 1673 – June 1674		Suleiman I
Shaykh Ali Khan Zanganeh	June 1674 – 1689	Zangana tribe	Suleiman I
Mohammad Taher Vahid Qazvini	1691 – May 1699		Suleiman I, Soltan Hoseyn
Mohammad Mo'men Khan Shamlu	May 1699 – 1707	Shamlu tribe	Soltan Hoseyn
Shahqoli Khan Zanganeh	1707–1715	Zangana tribe	Soltan Hoseyn
Fath-Ali Khan Daghestani	1715–1720	Shamkhal family of Kumukh	Soltan Hoseyn
Mohammad Qoli Khan Shamlu	1720–1721	Shamlu tribe	Soltan Hoseyn
Rajab Ali Beg	?		Soltan Hoseyn
Mohammad Ali Khan Mokri	1722		Soltan Hoseyn, Tahmasp II
Mortezaqoli Khan	1723		Tahmasp II
Mirza Abdol-Karim	1724		Tahmasp II
Farajollah Khan Abdollu	?		Tahmasp II
Mirza Mohammad Hossein	?		Tahmasp II
Mirza Abdollah	1724		Tahmasp II
Mirza Mo'men Qazvini	1725		Tahmasp II
Mirza Mohammad Rahim	1728–1730		Tahmasp II
Rajab Ali Khan	1731		Tahmasp II

== Sources ==
- Babaie, Sussan (2004). Slaves of the Shah: New Elites of Safavid Iran. I.B.Tauris. pp. 1–218. ISBN 9781860647215.
- Blow, David (2009). Shah Abbas: The Ruthless King Who became an Iranian Legend. London, UK: I. B. Tauris & Co. Ltd. ISBN 978-1-84511-989-8. LCCN 2009464064.
- Floor, Willem (2001). Safavid Government Institutions. Mazda Publishers. ISBN 978-1568591353.
- Matthee, Rudi (2010). "ḴALIFA SOLṬĀN". In Yarshater, Ehsan (ed.). Encyclopædia Iranica. Vol. XV/4: Kafir Kala–Ḵamsa of Jamāli. London and New York: Routledge & Kegan Paul. pp. 382–384. ISBN 978-1-934283-26-4.
- Matthee, Rudi (2011). Persia in Crisis: Safavid Decline and the Fall of Isfahan. I.B.Tauris. pp. 1–371. ISBN 978-0857731814.
- Mitchell, Colin P. (2009). The Practice of Politics in Safavid Iran: Power, Religion and Rhetoric. I.B.Tauris. pp. 1–304. ISBN 978-0857715883.
- Newman, Andrew J. (2008). Safavid Iran: Rebirth of a Persian Empire. I.B.Tauris. pp. 1–281. ISBN 9780857716613.
- Roemer, H.R. (1968). "The Safavid period". In Boyle, John Andrew (ed.). The Cambridge History of Iran: The Saljuq and Mongol Periods. Vol. 5. Cambridge: Cambridge University Press. pp. 189–351. ISBN 0-521-06936-X.
- Savory, Roger (2007). Iran under the Safavids. Cambridge University Press. ISBN 978-0521042512.
