= Mirza Mohammad Monshi =

Safavid grand vizier

Mirza Hedayatollah

Grand vizier of Safavid Iran
- In office 1586–1588
- Monarch: Mohammad Khodabanda
- Preceded by: Mirza Hedayatollah
- Succeeded by: Mirza Shah Vali
- In office 1588 – 29 January 1589
- Monarch: Abbas I
- Preceded by: Mirza Lotfi
- Succeeded by: Mirza Lotfollah Shirazi

Personal details
- Died: 29 January 1589
- Relations: Khvajeh Mirak Monshi (grandfather)
- Family: Kujuji family (maternal side)

Mirza Mohammad Monshi (Persian: میرزا محمد منشی), or Kermani, was a bureaucrat in Safavid Iran, who held high-ranking positions under Ismail II (r. 1576–1577), Mohammad Khodabanda (r. 1578–1587) and Abbas I (r. 1587–1629).

== Biography ==
Mirza Mohammad Monshi's mother was from the Kujuji family of Tabriz. His father was Ali Beg Sorkh, and he was the grandson of Khvajeh Mirak Monshi, a bureaucrat and calligrapher during the reign of Tahmasp I (r. 1524–1576). It was under the latter that Mirza Mohammad Monshi started his career as a scribe in the chancellery. During the reign of Ismail II (r. 1576–1577), Mirza Mohammad Monshi served as the majles-nevis (official record keeper) from 1576 to 1577. In 1583, he was promoted to mostowfi ol-mamalek (comptroller general).

In 1586, after the death of the crown prince Hamza Mirza, Mohammad Khodabanda (r. 1578–1587) appointed Mirza Mohammad Monshi as the grand vizier, thus succeeding Mirza Hedayatollah. Mirza Mohammad Monshi and Ali Qoli Khan Ustajlu were the main political allies of Mohammad Khodabanda.

Mirza Mohammad Monshi was arrested in 1588 during the transition of power involving Morshed Qoli Khan and Abbas I (r. 1587–1629). He managed to survive the extensive political purge that occurred shortly thereafter, instead being demoted as the vizier of Mohammad Khodabanda's son Abu Talib Mirza. Meanwhile, Morshed Qoli Khan had his own vizier Mirza Shah Vali installed as grand vizier.

Mirza Mohammad Monshi was one of the key figures in the coup against Morshed Qoli Khan, which he secretively coordinated with Shah Abbas I, who in return promised him to reappoint him as grand vizier. After Morshed Qoli Khan was killed, Shah Abbas I reappointed Mirza Mohammad Monshi as grand vizier in 1588.

Mirza Mohammad Monshi's inability to limit his political goals resulted in his downfall. On 29 January 1589, he was executed for being "overbearing and seditious." He was succeeded by Mirza Lotfollah Shirazi.

== Sources ==
- Floor, Willem (2001). Safavid Government Institutions. Mazda Publishers. ISBN 978-1568591353.
- Mitchell, Colin P. (2009). The Practice of Politics in Safavid Iran: Power, Religion and Rhetoric. I.B.Tauris. ISBN 978-0857715883.
- Monshi, Eskandar Beg (1629). History of Shah 'Abbas the Great (Tārīkh-e 'Ālamārā-ye 'Abbāsī) / Roger M. Savory, translator.

| Preceded by Mirza Hedayatollah | Grand vizier of Safavid Iran; 1586–1588 | Succeeded by Mirza Shah Vali |
| Preceded by Mirza Lotfi | Grand vizier of Safavid Iran; 1588 – 29 January 1589 | Succeeded by Mirza Lotfollah Shirazi |
