= Khajeh Amir Beg Mohrdar =

Khvajeh Amir Beg Mohrdar (Persian: خواجه امیر بیگ مهردار) was a bureaucrat in Safavid Iran, who served as the grand vizier of Tahmasp I (r. 1524–1576) briefly in 1551. During this period, the office of grand vizier was shared between several people. Amir Beg shared it with Khvajeh Ghayath al-Din Ali and Aqa Mohammad Farahani Kajaji.

Born in Natanz, Khvajeh Amir Beg was a member of the Kujuji family. Due to allegations of corruption, he was dismissed and imprisoned for some time. He later served as the vizier of Amir Soltan Rumlu in Kerman. His last position was as the warden of the Imam Reza shrine in Mashhad, where he was dismissed due to new allegations of corruption. He was imprisoned in Alamut, where he died in 1575/76.

== Sources ==
- Floor, Willem (2001). Safavid Government Institutions. Mazda Publishers. ISBN 978-1568591353.
- Werner, Christoph (2017). "The Kujujī Poets: Families, Poetry and Forms of Patronage in Azerbaijan and beyond (Fourteenth to Seventeenth Centuries)". Eurasian Studies. 15 (2): 250–279. doi:10.1163/24685623-12340038.

Preceded by Qadi Jahan Qazvini	Grand vizier of Safavid Iran; 1551	Succeeded by Khvajeh Ghayath al-Din Ali and Aqa Mohammad Farahani Kajaji
