= Jalal al-Din Mohammad Tabrizi =

Safavid grand vizier in 1523–1524

Grand Vizier of the Safavid Empire
- In office 1523–1524
- Monarchs: Ismail I (r. 1501–1524); Tahmasp I (r. 1524–1576)
- Preceded by: Mirza Shah Hossein
- Succeeded by: Qadi Jahan Qazvini

Personal details
- Died: 1524

Jalal al-Din Mohammad Tabrizi (Persian: جلال الدین محمد تبریزی) was a bureaucrat in Safavid Iran, who served as the grand vizier of Ismail I (r. 1501–1524) and Tahmasp I (r. 1524–1576) from 1523 to 1524.

== Biography ==
Jalal al-Din Mohammad was a member of the Kujuji family from Tabriz. He was said to have been "unsurpassed" in formal correspondence while serving in the chancellery. After Mirza Shah Hossein was killed in 1523, Jalal al-Din Mohammad succeeded him as grand vizier. He was linked to the alliance between the Shamlu and Ustajlu tribes. After the death of Ismail I (r. 1501–1524) in 1524, Jalal al-Din Mohammad was killed by rebellious members of the Rumlu tribe. He was succeeded by Qadi Jahan Qazvini.

Like many other of his family members, Jalal al-Din Mohammad also wrote poetry. According to the contemporary Safavid court historian Iskandar Beg Munshi, Jalal al-Din Mohammad composed a ruba'i for his friend:

Oh, light of my two world-enlightening eyes you left and my days have turned dark as the night
We two have been like two candles together the days have killed you, while I am still burning

== Sources ==
- Floor, Willem (2001). Safavid Government Institutions. Mazda Publishers. ISBN 978-1568591353.
- Newman, Andrew J. (2008). Safavid Iran: Rebirth of a Persian Empire. I.B.Tauris. ISBN 978-0857716613.
- Mitchell, Colin P. (2009). The Practice of Politics in Safavid Iran: Power, Religion and Rhetoric. I.B.Tauris. ISBN 978-0857715883.
- Werner, Christoph (2017). "The Kujujī Poets: Families, Poetry and Forms of Patronage in Azerbaijan and beyond (Fourteenth to Seventeenth Centuries)". Eurasian Studies. 15 (2): 250–279. doi:10.1163/24685623-12340038.

Preceded by Mirza Shah Hossein	Grand vizier of Safavid Iran; 1523–1524	Succeeded by Qadi Jahan Qazvini
