= Savaji =

Savaji is a surname. Notable people with the surname include:

- Mirza Jafar Savaji (fl. 1525–1531), Safavid Iran grand vizier
- Salman Savaji (died 1376), Persian poet
- Qazi Isa Savaji (died 1491), Persian bureaucrat
- Zayn al-Din Omar Savaji (fl. 12th century), Persian philosopher

== See also ==
- Savaji family, Persian family
