= Mirza Shokrollah Isfahani =

16th-century Persian statesman

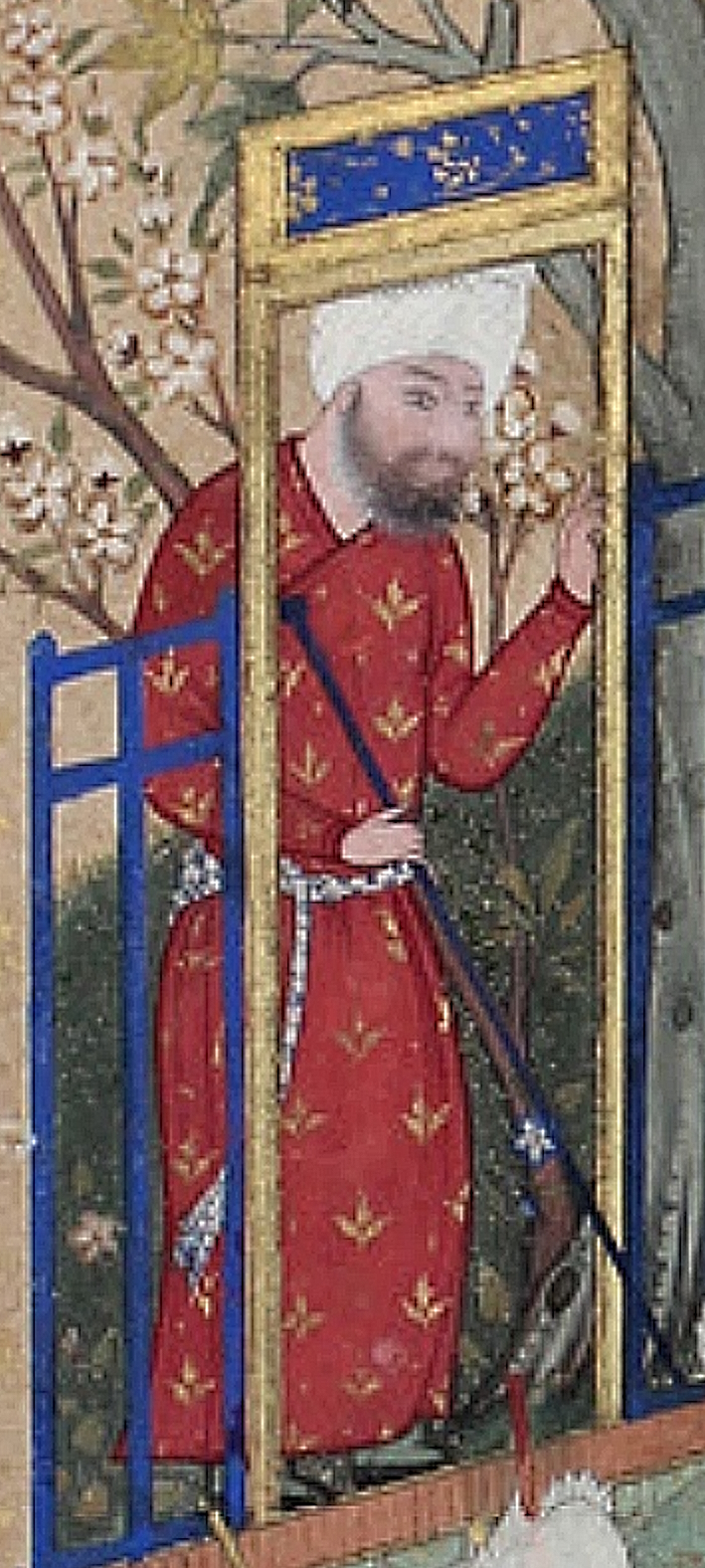
- Mirza Shokrollah Isfahani holding the ministerial staff, in the Bustan of Sa'di (1579).

Grand vizier of Safavid Iran
- In office 1576 – June 1577
- Monarch: Ismail II
- Preceded by: Vacant
- Succeeded by: Mirza Salman Jaberi

Mostowfi ol-mamalek (comptroller general)
- In office 1573–1576
- Monarch: Tahmasp I
- Preceded by: Mir Ghayath al-Din Mahmud Shahrestani Esfahani
- Succeeded by: Mirza Shah Ghari

Personal details
- Died: 1581 Damghan, Safavid Iran
- Children: Mohammad Hossein Tabrizi

Mirza Shokrollah Isfahani (Persian: میرزا شکرالله اصفهانی) was a bureaucrat in Safavid Iran, who held high-ranking positions under Tahmasp I (r. 1524–1576), Ismail II (r. 1576–1577) and Mohammad Khodabanda (r. 1578–1587).

== Biography ==
Mirza Shokrollah Isfahani was of Persian origin. In 1573, during the reign of Tahmasp I (r. 1524–1576), Mirza Shokrollah was appointed as the mostowfi ol-mamalek (comptroller general), succeeding Mir Ghayath al-Din Mahmud Shahrestani Esfahani. A few days after the coronation of Ismail II on 22 August 1576, the latter appointed Mirza Shokrollah as his grand vizier. Before that, the office had been unfilled since 1573/74, during the joint vizierate of Mir Sayyed Hossein Farahani and Khvajeh Kamal al-Din Ali. The chief accountant office was given to Mirza Shah Ghari.

According to Colin P. Mitchell, the promotion of Mirza Shokrollah challenges the idea that Ismail II had an anti-Shia policy and "points to a policy of continuity rather than variance." In June 1577, Mirza Shokrollah was removed from his position as vizier for lack of competence. He was succeeded by Mirza Salman Jaberi. Under Mohammad Khodabanda (r. 1578–1587), Mirza Shokrollah served as the vizier of Khorasan and warden of the Imam Reza shrine in Mashhad. According to the contemporary court scribe and chronicler Iskandar Beg Munshi, Mirza Shokrollah failed to gain succees during this period due to his poor standing with the provincial governors.

Mirza Shokrollah died in 1581 in Damghan. He was the father of the calligrapher Mohammad Hossein Tabrizi.

== Sources ==
- Berthels, E. (1965). "Muḥammad Ḥusayn Tabrīzī". In Lewis, B.; Pellat, Ch. & Schacht, J. (eds.). The Encyclopaedia of Islam, Second Edition. Volume II: C–G. Leiden: E. J. Brill. OCLC 495469475.
- Floor, Willem (2001). Safavid Government Institutions. Mazda Publishers. ISBN 978-1568591353.
- Newman, Andrew J. (2008). Safavid Iran: Rebirth of a Persian Empire. I.B.Tauris. ISBN 978-0857716613.
- Mitchell, Colin P. (2009). The Practice of Politics in Safavid Iran: Power, Religion and Rhetoric. I.B.Tauris. ISBN 978-0857715883.
- Monshi, Eskandar Beg (1629). History of Shah 'Abbas the Great (Tārīkh-e 'Ālamārā-ye 'Abbāsī) / Roger M. Savory, translator.
- Soudavar, Abolala (31 January 2014). "The Patronage of the Vizier Mirza Salman". Muqarnas Online. 30 (1): 213–234. doi:10.1163/22118993-0301P0010.

Preceded by Vacant	Grand vizier of Safavid Iran; 1576–1577	Succeeded by Mirza Salman Jaberi
