= Saru Taqi Mosque =

Shi'te mosque in Isfahan, Iran

Saru Taqi Mosque مسجد ساروتقی
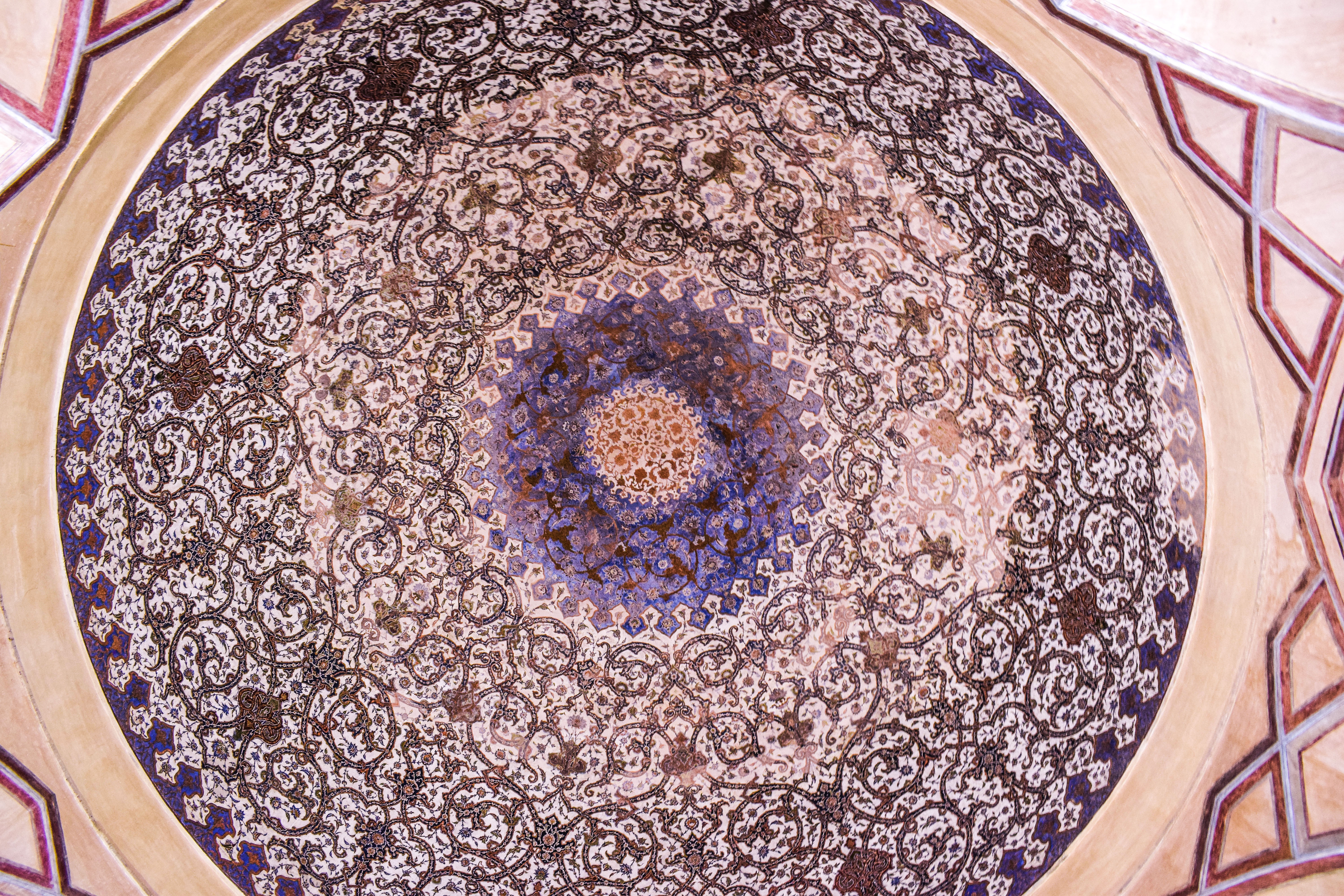
- Interior of the mosque dome

- Location of the mosque in Iran

Religion
- Affiliation: Shia Islam
- Ecclesiastical or organisational status: Mosque
- Status: Active

Location
- Location: Esfahan, Isfahan Province
- Country: Iran
- Coordinates: 32°39′44″N 51°40′48″E

Architecture
- Type: Mosque architecture
- Style: Safivid
- Completed: 1053 AH (1643/1644 CE)

Specifications
- Dome: One (maybe more)
- Materials: Bricks

Iran National Heritage List
- Official name: Saru Taqi Mosque
- Type: Mosque
- Designated: 1932
- Reference no.: 113
- Conservation organization: Cultural Heritage, Handicrafts and Tourism Organization of Iran

The Saru Taqi Mosque is a Shi'ite mosque located in the bazaar, near the Hassan Abad Gate, in Esfahan, in the province of Isfahan, Iran. The mosque was completed in 1053 AH (1643/1644 CE), during the Safavid era.

== Overview ==
The mosque forms part of the Sarutaqi Complex (Persian: مجموعه بناهای ساروتقی) that comprises a caravanserai, the Bazaar of Saru Taqi, a palace (since destroyed), and a square. The mosque was added to the Iran National Heritage List in 1932, administered by the Cultural Heritage, Handicrafts and Tourism Organization of Iran.

The mosque and associated complex were named in honour of Saru Taqi, also known as Mirza Muhammad Taqi and Mirza Taqi, one of the most influential 17th-century Safavid politicians, courtiers, and patrons of architecture. The name of "Saru Taqi" and 1053 AH were inscribed on the portal iwan. The exterior of the dome is simple brickwork, and its interior is decorated with beautiful painting and plasterwork. These decorations also covered the surface of the walls, which were plastered in subsequent periods.

== See also ==
- Islam in Iran
- List of mosques in Iran
- List of historical structures in Isfahan
