= Mirza Mohammad Ebrahim Nasiri =

Mirza Mohammad Ebrahim Nasiri was an official in Safavid Iran and member of the Ordubadi family. In 1680, he was appointed as the vizier of the governor of the Astarabad province, thus marking the start of his career. During a period in his later career, he became the custodian of the tomb of Shah Safi, then the vizier of the Azerbaijan province, and then the monshi al-mamalek. He was removed from his post after enemies at court conspired against him. In 1669/1700 he was appointed as the majles-nevis (official record keeper), signaling his return to favor at court. Mohammad Ebrahim was still alive in 1714, and was also the author of the Dastur-e Shahryaran, a historical chronicle about the early reign of Shah Soltan Hoseyn (r. 1694–1722).

He may have been the father of Mohammad Rabi ibn Mohammad Ebrahim, the ambassador to the Siamese Ayutthaya Kingdom and author of the Safine-ye Solaymani.

== Sources ==
- Floor, Willem (2008). Titles and Emoluments in Safavid Iran: A Third Manual of Safavid Administration, by Mirza Naqi Nasiri. Washington, D.C.: Mage Publishers. ISBN 978-1933823232.
