= Mirza Ata-Allah Isfahani =

Safavid statesman (16th century)

Mirza Ata-Allah Isfahani (Persian: میرزا عطا الله اصفهانی) was a high-ranking Persian statesman in the early Safavid era, who served as the vizier of Azerbaijan, Karabakh, and Shirvan.

== Biography ==
A member of the Khuzani family of Isfahan, Ata-Allah is first mentioned in 1524, when he was assigned by the newly crowned shah Tahmasp I (r. 1524–1576) to transport a royal decree (farman) and robe of honour to court of the Shirvanshah Khalilullah II, who ruled Shirvan under Safavid suzerainty. Ata-Allah afterwards served as vizier of Azerbaijan, Qarabagh, and Shirvan. In 1548, he helped the fellow Isfahan-born Mirza Salman Jaberi get enlisted under the service of Tahmasp I.

In 1555, Tahmasp moved the capital from Tabriz to Qazvin, but Ata-Allah nevertheless chose to stay in the former capital. In 1558, he accompanied the Ottoman rebel prince Şehzade Bayezid from Yerevan to the royal court in Qazvin. According to the Safavid court historian Iskandar Beg Munshi, Ata-Allah's administrative work was so influential, that "the administrative practices they instituted are still the rule and model in those provinces." When Ata-Allah died sometime in the early 1560s, the poet Abdi Beg Shirazi composed a poem in his honour. He was survived by a son, Mirza Ahmad Khuzani, who served in the chancellery, and whose son, Mirza Shah Vali Isfahani, served as the grand vizier of the country briefly in 1587.

== Sources ==
- Mitchell, Colin P. (2009). The Practice of Politics in Safavid Iran: Power, Religion and Rhetoric. I.B.Tauris. pp. 1–304. ISBN 978-0857715883.
- Mitchell, Colin Paul (2007). "JĀBERI". Encyclopaedia Iranica, Vol. XIV, Fasc. 3. pp. 313–314.
- Mitchell, Colin P., ed. (2011). New Perspectives on Safavid Iran: Empire and Society. Milton Park, UK: Routledge. ISBN 978-0-4157-7462-8. LCCN 2010032352.
- Meri, Josef W. (2006). Medieval Islamic Civilization: L-Z, index. Taylor & Francis. pp. 1–878. ISBN 9780415966924.
