= Ibn al-Savaji =

14th-century Iranian calligrapher, translator, and poet

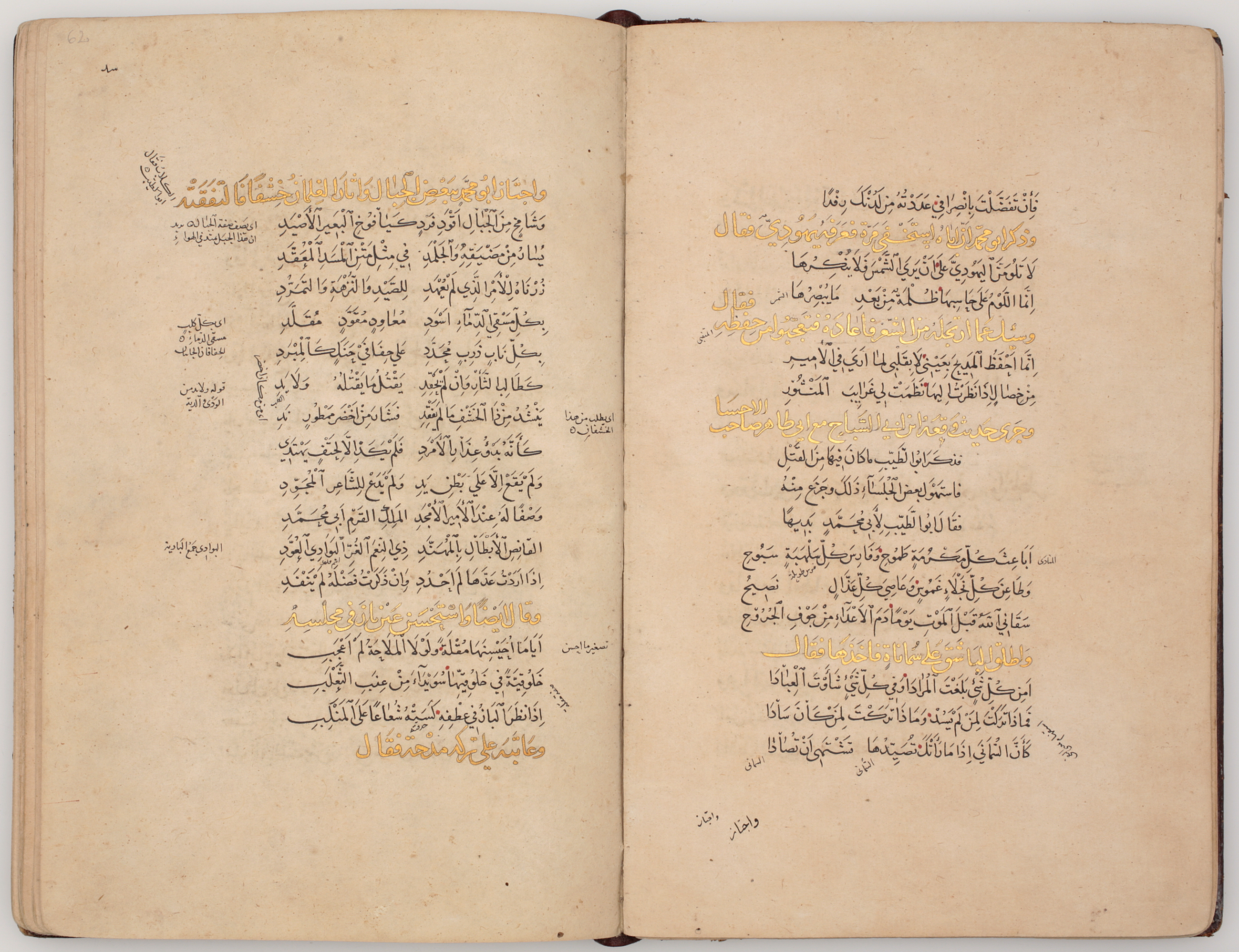
Copy of the diwan (complete poems) of al-Mutanabbi, signed by Ibn al-Savaji, dated 1313-1314

Muhammad ibn Sa'd Nakhjavani, better known as Ibn al-Savaji (died after 1332), was an Iranian calligrapher, translator, and poet active during the later Ilkhanid period. He was a member of the Savaji family.

Virtually all information about Ibn al-Savaji derives from the manuscripts he copied and the translations he produced. These sources indicate that he belonged to a class of learned scholars who operated primarily in local intellectual circles rather than within the imperial administration or the major courtly scriptoria of the Ilkhanate. Active during the reigns of the Ilkhans Öljaitü (r. 1304–1316) and Abu Sa'id (r. 1316–1335), he demonstrated a high degree of proficiency in both Arabic and Persian and moved with ease between the two languages. At least sixteen surviving manuscripts have been identified as being in his hand, in addition to several translations attributed to him.

== Sources ==
- Marlow, Louise (2026). "The Professional Life of a Calligrapher-Translator: Social Mobility and Intellectual Versatility among Mid-Level Scholars of the Later Ilkhanate". Eurasian Studies. 23 (1–2): 25–76. doi:10.1163/24685623-20250176.
- Subtelny, Maria (2021). "Kāshifī's Asrār-i qāsimī: A Late Timurid Manual of the Occult Sciences and Its Safavid Afterlife". In Saif, Liana; Leoni, Francesca; Melvin-Koushki, Matthew; Yahya, Farouk (eds.). Islamicate Occult Sciences in Theory and Practise. Brill.
