= Ordubadi family =

Iranian family

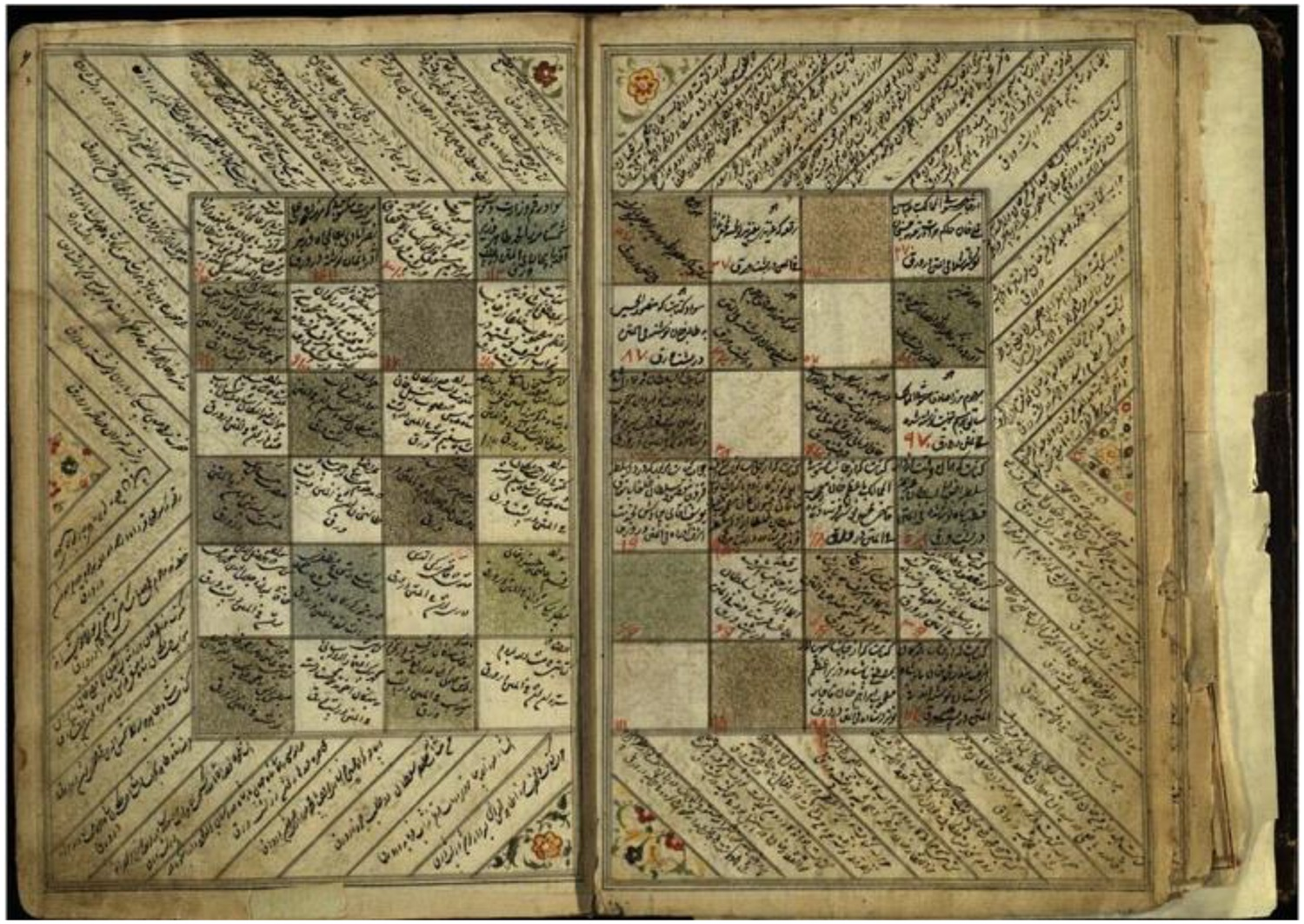
Household anthology of the Ordubadi family, authored by Mohammad Mo'in Ordubadi in 1697 (Tehran University MS 2591 folios 3 verso and 4 recto)

The Ordubadi family (Persian: خاندان اردوبادی), also spelled Urdubadi, otherwise known as the Nasiri family, was an Iranian family, which was descended from the medieval philosopher and polymath Nasir al-Din al-Tusi. The family was from Ordubad, a town on the northern bank of the Aras river, and is first mentioned during the Mongol invasions and conquests. The family thereafter disappears from sources, and is first mentioned several decades later when the Safavid dynasty conquered Iran and its surroundings in the 15th century. The leader of the family Bahram Khan Ordubadi, began serving the Safavid king (shah) Ismail I (r. 1501–1524), who appointed him as the civil administrator (kalantar) of Ordubad.

Bahram's son Hatem Beg Ordubadi, later succeeded his father as the lord of Ordubad, and received the title of "Beg" (lord). In 1591, Hatem Beg was appointed by Shah Abbas I (r. 1588–1629) as his grand vizier, and later died in 1610/11. His son, Mirza Taleb Khan Ordubadi, would also serve as Shah Abbas' grand vizier in 1610/11–1621. Later, he also served as grand vizier to Shah Safi (r. 1629–1642) from 1632 until 1633, when he was assassinated by the eunuch Saru Taqi, who had a personal hatred towards the Ordubadi family. This was due to Hatem Beg having had denied Saru Taqi's father a post he had sought.

Another member of the family, Mirza Abol-Hosayn Beg Ordubadi, served as the treasurer (khezanadar-bashi) during the early reign of Shah Safi, while a later member, Mirza Naqi Nasiri, wrote the Dastur al-Muluk, an important manual about the empire's administration. He also served as secretary of the royal council (Majles-Nevis or vaqāye'-nevis) for several years.

== Sources ==
- Blow, David (2009). Shah Abbas: The Ruthless King Who became an Iranian Legend. London, UK: I. B. Tauris & Co. Ltd. ISBN 978-1-84511-989-8. LCCN 2009464064.
- Floor, Willem M.; Faghfoory, Mohammad H. (2007). The Dastur Al-moluk: A Safavid State Manual, by Mohammad Rafi' al-Din Ansari. Mazda Publishers. pp. 1–355. ISBN 978-1568591957.
- Floor, Willem M. (2008). Titles and Emoluments in Safavid Iran: A Third Manual of Safavid Administration, by Mirza Naqi Nasiri. Washington, DC: Mage Publishers. pp. 1–324. ISBN 978-1933823232.
- Matthee, Rudi (2011). Persia in Crisis: Safavid Decline and the Fall of Isfahan. I.B.Tauris. pp. 1–371. ISBN 978-0857731814.
- Babaie, Sussan (2004). Slaves of the Shah: New Elites of Safavid Iran. I.B.Tauris. pp. 1–218. ISBN 9781860647215.
- Marcinkowski, M. Ismail (2005). "DASTUR AL-MOLUK". Encyclopaedia Iranica.
- Newman, Andrew J. (2008). Safavid Iran: Rebirth of a Persian Empire. I.B.Tauris. pp. 1–281. ISBN 9780857716613.
- Roemer, H.R. (1986). "The Safavid period". The Cambridge History of Iran, Volume 5: The Timurid and Safavid periods. Cambridge: Cambridge University Press. pp. 189–351. ISBN 9780521200943.
