= Mohammad Hossein Tabrizi =

16th century Persian calligrapher

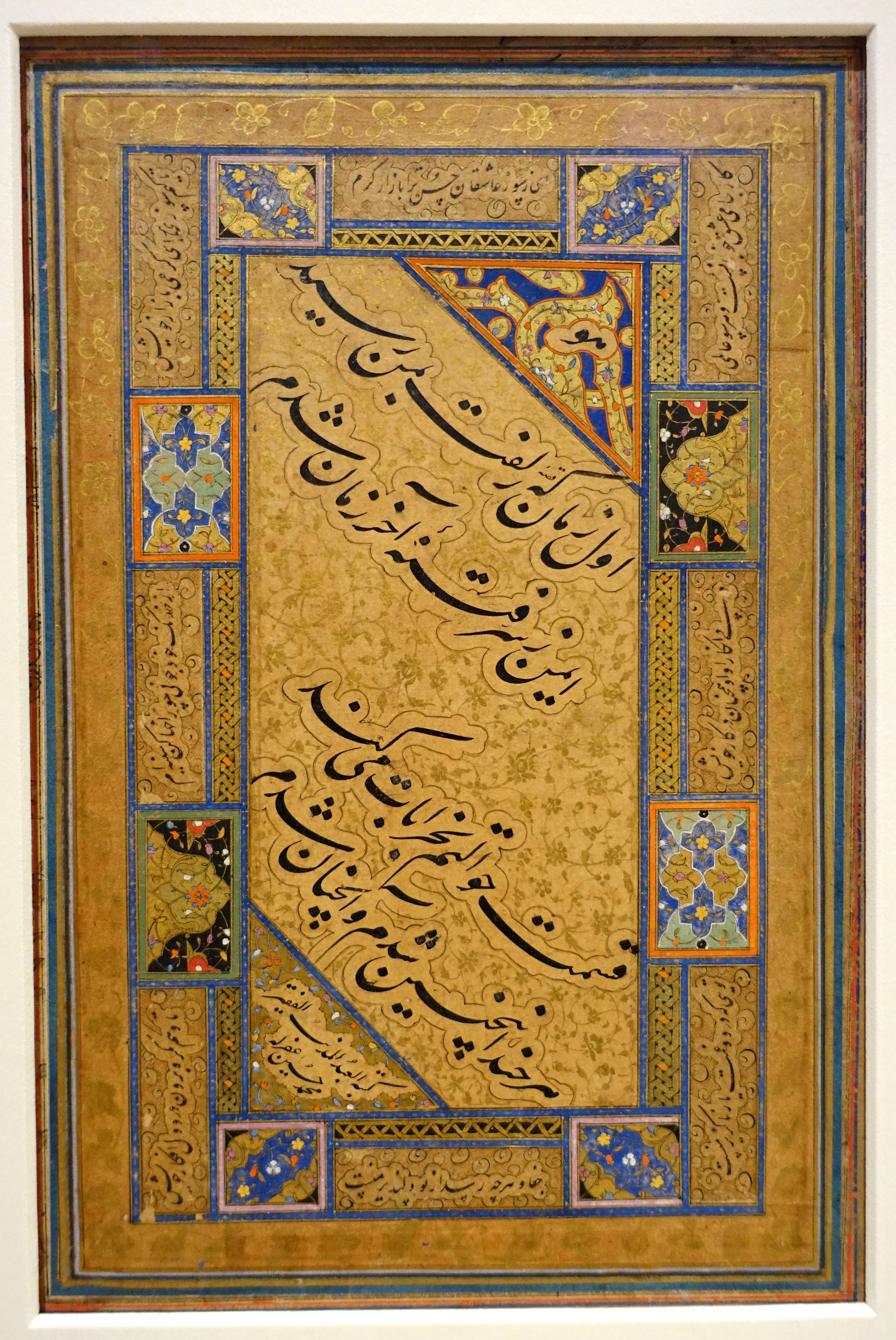
Album leaf (muraqqa'), signed Mohammad Hossein Tabrizi, Qazvin, Iran c. 1575

Mohammad Hossein Tabrizi (Persian: محمد حسین تبریزی) was a Persian calligrapher in 16th-century Safavid Iran. Tabrizi learnt calligraphy from the famous Ahmad Mashhadi. He later became a teacher of the equally renowned Mir Emad Hassani. Due to his great command in the art of calligraphy, a renowned profession in Iran, he was bestowed with the honorary title mihin Ustad ("greatest master").

His father Mirza Shokrollah Isfahani was the mostowfi ol-mamalek ("chief accountant") under Safavid Shah Tahmasp I (r. 1524-1576), whereas he himself was vizier to Shah Ismail II (r. 1576-1577). After losing favour under Ismail II, he was forced to move to Mughal India, where he lived until his death. Tabrizi reportedly created inscriptions for the masjeds (mosques) and khanqahs of Tabriz, but they have almost entirely been destroyed due to earthquakes that hit the city. After finishing these inscriptions, Tabrizi made the Hajj to Mecca and on his return solely devoted his time to copying the masterpieces of Persian poetry. A divan of the Persian poet Amir Shahi Sabzavari from Tabrizi's pen is located in the Cambridge University Library.
