= Mahmud Jan Daylami =

Safavid grand vizier from 1502/03 to 1507

- محمود جان دیلمی

Grand Vizier of the Safavid Empire
- In office 1502/03–1507 Co-leading with Amir Zakariya
- Monarchs: Ismail I (r. 1501–1524)
- Preceded by: Amir Zakariya
- Succeeded by: Najm-e Sani

Sharaf al-Din Shah-Mahmud Jan Daylami Qazvini (Persian: شرف الدین شاه-محمود جان دیلمی قزوینی), better known as Mahmud Jan Daylami, was an Iranian bureaucrat from the Daylami family, who occupied high offices under the Aq Qoyunlu and the Safavids.

== Biography ==
A native of Qazvin, Mahmud Jan was a member of the Daylami family from the regions of Persian Iraq and Gilan. In his early career, Mahmud Jan served as administrator of the financial affairs of Persian Iraq and Fars under the Aq Qoyunlu ruler Sultan Khalil (r. 1478). During the reign of Sultan Khalil's brother and successor Ya'qub Beg (r. 1478–1490), the powerful chief military judge and chief financial minister, Qazi Isa Savaji utilized his power by appointing his friends and relatives to high offices, including Mahmud Jan, who was his brother-in-law and thus received the offices of vazir (finance officer) and mushrif (inspector) of the royal council. Mahmud Jan's son (Qazi Isa's nephew) Najm al-Din Mas'ud Savaji was made the parvanachi (royal secretary). The contemporary Timurid statesman and writer Ali-Shir Nava'i refers to Mahmud Jan as one of the leading figures under Ya'qub. Mahmud Jan is included amongst the figures mentioned in the Munsha'at of Qadi Husayn Maybudi, a collection of 112 letters to prominent political and intellectual figures of the Aq Qoyunlu and Timurid realms.

While Mahmud Jan along with Shaykh Ali Savaji (Qazi Isa's brother) were assessing and seizing tax-free places in the southern city of Shiraz, Ya'qub became severely ill and died on 24 December 1490 in the Transcaucasian region of Qarabagh. Following his death, the Aq Qoyunlu fell into a state of succession wars, thus leading to its decline. The governor of Shiraz had Shaykh Ali captured and taken to the capital of Tabriz, where he was tortured. Four days following Ya'qub's death, Qazi Isa was captured and afterwards hanged. Najm al-Din Mas'ud managed to escape for a short while, until he was as well captured and executed. Mahmud Jan escaped the fate of his associates by fleeing to Qazvin. During this period, he moved in and out of his government posts. After the Aq Qoyunlu prince Rustam Beg Bayandur (r. 1492–1497) had captured Tabriz in May 1492, Mahmud Jan was summoned to serve as his financial manager.

By 1497, Rustam Beg found himself largely deserted by his subjects, and was soon deposed and killed by his cousin Gövde Aḥmad, who had received reinforcements by the Ottoman Empire. In 1499, Mahmud Jan was once more recalled by another Aq Qoyunlu ruler, Sultan Khalil's son Alvand Beg (r. 1497–1504/5), who had captured Tabriz with the backing of the Bayandur and Mawsillu chieftains. Mahmud Jan appears in records as a high-ranking administrator under Alvand Beg. In 1502, the Safavid shah (king) Ismail I (r. 1501–1524) appointed Mahmud Jan as his vizier to jointly serve with Amir Zakariya, another former Aq Qoyunlu bureaucrat. Mahmud Jan's former colleague Idris Bitlisi soon contacted him, asking him to help as a mediator with Ismail I, whom he had fallen out with. In 1507, as a part of a larger rearrangement of the bureaucracy, Mahmud Jan and Amir Zakariya were replaced with Najm-e Sani.

== Sources ==
- Dunietz, Alexandra (2015). The Cosmic Perils of Qadi Ḥusayn Maybudī in Fifteenth-Century Iran. Brill. ISBN 978-9004302310.
- Langaroodi, Reza Rezazadeh; Negahban, Farzin (2008). "Āq-qūyūnlū". In Madelung, Wilferd; Daftary, Farhad (eds.). Encyclopaedia Islamica Online. Brill Online. ISSN 1875-9831.
- Markiewicz, Christopher (2019). The Crisis of Kingship in Late Medieval Islam: Persian Emigres and the Making of Ottoman Sovereignty. Cambridge University Press.
- Minorsky, Vladimir (1955). "The Aq-qoyunlu and Land Reforms". Bulletin of the School of Oriental and African Studies. 17 (3): 449–462. doi:10.1017/S0041977X00112376. JSTOR 609589. S2CID 154166838. (registration required)
- Mitchell, Colin P. (2009). The Practice of Politics in Safavid Iran: Power, Religion and Rhetoric. I.B.Tauris. pp. 1–304. ISBN 978-0857715883.
- Woods, John E. (1999). The Aqquyunlu: Clan, Confederation, Empire (Revised and Expanded ed.). University of Utah Press. ISBN 978-0874805659.

Grand Vizier of the Safavid Empire; 1502–1507	Succeeded by Najm-e Sani
