= Ala al-Din Siddiq Kujuji =

Vizier of the Qara Qoyunlu Turkomans (mid 15th century AD)

Ala al-Din Siddiq Kujuji (fl. mid 15th-century) was a Persian bureaucrat from the Kujuji family, who served as a vizier to the Qara Qoyunlu leader Jahan Shah (r. 1438–1467) from c. 1447 to 1455/6. Siddiq later played a key role in the succession struggle that ensured after Jahan Shah's death.

== Sources ==
- Zakrzewski, Daniel (2018). "Local Elites and Dynastic Succession: Tabriz prior to, under and following Mongol Rule (Sixth/Twelfth to Ninth/Fifteenth Centuries)". In Durand-Guédy, David; Mottahedeh, Roy; Paul, Jürgen (eds.). Cities of Medieval Iran. Brill. pp. 352–394. ISBN 978-90-04-43433-2.
