= Hatem Beg Ordubadi =

Iranian bureaucrat

Hatem Ordubadi Beg

Grand Vizier of the Safavid Empire
- In office 1591–1610/1
- Monarch: Abbas I
- Preceded by: Mirza Lotf Allah Shirazi
- Succeeded by: Mirza Taleb Khan Ordubadi

Personal details
- Died: 1610/1 Near Urmia, Azerbaijan
- Resting place: Under Hatam Khani Dome in Imam Reza Shrine
- Children: Mirza Taleb Khan Ordubadi
- Family: Ordubadi family

Military service
- Allegiance: Safavid Empire
- Years of service: 1570s–1610/1
- Battles/wars: Ottoman–Safavid War (1603–18); Siege of Dimdim

Hatem Beg Ordubadi (Persian: حاتم بیگ اردوبادی), was an Iranian bureaucrat from the Ordubadi family, who served as the grand vizier of the Safavid shah (king) Shah Abbas I (r. 1588–1629) from 1591 to 1610/1.

== Biography ==
=== Background and early life ===
Hatem was the son of Bahram Khan Ordubadi, the lord of Ordubad, the homeland of the Ordubadi family—an Iranian family which was descended from the medieval philosopher and polymath Nasir al-Din al-Tusi. Hatem later succeeded his father as the lord of Urdubad, and received the title of "Beg" (lord). (Note: With regard to the administration, this meant that he became the new kalantar ("mayor").) Due to local disagreements, he resigned however, and went to the royal court. In the ensuing period he served as vizier of the governor of Khoy. However, when the latter was dismissed later on, Hatem Beg lost his job as well, and settled again in Ordubad and later Ardabil. His fortunes changed in the early rule of Abbas I, when he was appointed as the vizier of the governor of Kerman, Vali Beg Yuz Bashi Afshar and was later made the accountant (mostowfi al-mamalek) of Yazd.

=== Vizierate under Shah Abbas I ===
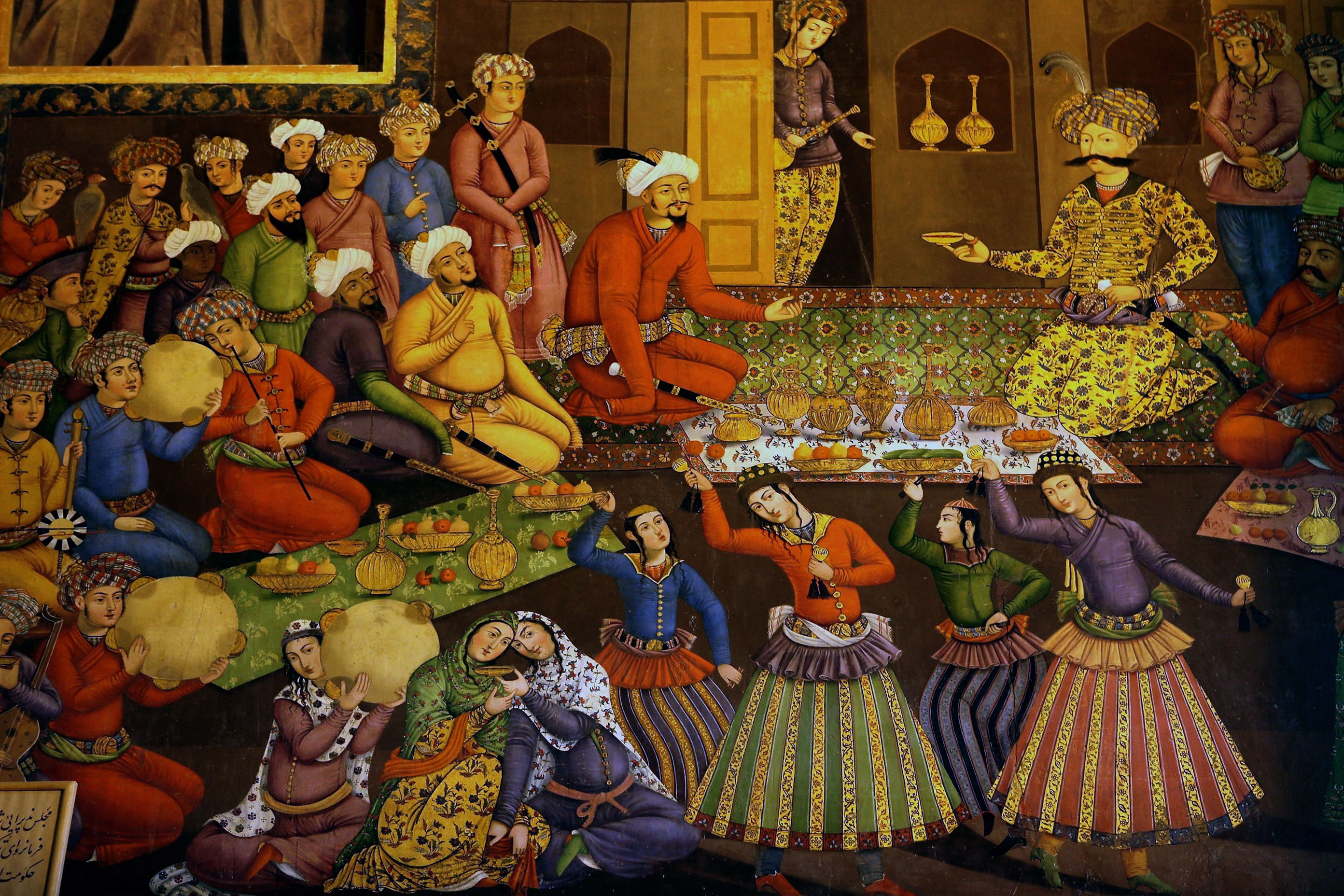
The court of Shah Abbas I

In 1587-1588, Hatem's brother Abu Taleb Beg, then the mostowfi al-mamalek was sent as an envoy to the ruler of the Uzbeks, Abdullah Khan II, who was trying to take Herat from the Safavids at the time. Abdullah Khan II was not interested in negotiations, and had Abu Taleb Beg executed by putting him in front of the mouth of a cannon. As a result of this gruesome tale in relation to his close relative, Hatem Beg was taken under Abbas I's wings, and in 1591, he appointed him as the mostowfi al-mamalek of all of Iran, while six months later he made him his grand vizier. Hatem Beg, who became known by his honorific of Etemad-e daulat ("Trusty Support of the State"), which was given to every Safavid grand vizier, demonstrated to be a statesman of noteworthy capacity during his tenure as grand vizier. During his tenure he managed to form a highly potent state administration that allowed the country to persist to prosper under considerably less adept shahs after Abbas I's death.

The Safavid court historian Iskandar Beg Munshi, who was attached to the retinue of Hatem Beg, states that he "brought security into the lives of Iranians" and "was a model for all in regard to the administration of justice, his knowledge of accounting procedures, and his organisation of divan affairs." Hatem Beg was evenly held in high regard by the Europeans—the Carmelite friar Father Paul Simon, recounted Hatem Beg's calmness in dealing with difficult tasks. He describes how Hatem Beg "used to despatch 200 petitions in a morning, and after having sat and given a hearing for six or seven hours would go out as serene as if he were coming from taking his horse for a walk." Aside from his administrative responsibilities, Hatem Beg also distinguished him as a military commander in the consolidation of the country. It was unusual for a person of Iranian stock to be involved in military affairs—the Iranian statesman Mirza Salman Jaberi, who had served as grand vizier from 1577 to 1583, had as a result of his involvement in military affairs made the Qizilbash hostile towards him, who felt that their power had been usurped. Mirza Salman Jaberi was eventually murdered by the Qizilbash. Hatem Beg's involvement in military affairs, however, did not arouse the antagonism of the Qizilbash, which, in the words of David Blow, was "a sign of changing times".

In 1594/5, Hatem Beg, together with a group of administrators and accountants, were sent to the newly subdued province of Gilan, where they improved the structure of tax charge and contribution, which, supposedly, was done at the demand of the residents who were discontent with the oppressive governorship of Mehdi Qoli Khan Shamlu. More likely, however, this reform took place due to the economic capability the province offered—its rich silk manufacture, tea, caviar, and lumber encouraged Abbas I to dispatch his most prominent officers to overhaul the economic system of the province in a just approach.

=== Death and offspring ===
Hatem Beg died in 1610/1 near Urmia during an expedition—he was buried in Mashhad. His son, Mirza Taleb Khan Ordubadi, succeeded him as grand vizier, occupying the office till 1621. He was reappointed as grand vizier during the reign of shah Safi (r. 1629–1642) from 1632 until 1633, where he was assassinated by the eunuch Saru Taqi, due to a personal hatred he had towards the Ordubadi family, the reason being that Hatem Beg had denied to give Saru Taqi's father a post which he had asked for.

== Burial place ==
He died near Urmia and his body brought to Mashhad and buried under Hatam Khani Dome in Imam Reza Shrine.

== Sources ==
- Blow, David (2009). Shah Abbas: The Ruthless King Who became an Iranian Legend. London, UK: I. B. Tauris & Co. Ltd. ISBN 978-1-84511-989-8. LCCN 2009464064.
- Floor, Willem M. (2008). Titles and Emoluments in Safavid Iran: A Third Manual of Safavid Administration, by Mirza Naqi Nasiri. Washington, DC: Mage Publishers. ISBN 978-1933823232.
- Matthee, Rudi (2011). Persia in Crisis: Safavid Decline and the Fall of Isfahan. I.B.Tauris. pp. 1–371. ISBN 978-0857731814.
- Babaie, Sussan (2004). Slaves of the Shah: New Elites of Safavid Iran. I.B.Tauris. pp. 1–218. ISBN 9781860647215.
- Newman, Andrew J. (2008). Safavid Iran: Rebirth of a Persian Empire. I.B.Tauris. pp. 1–281. ISBN 9780857716613.
- Roemer, H.R. (1986). "The Safavid period". The Cambridge History of Iran, Volume 5: The Timurid and Safavid periods. Cambridge: Cambridge University Press. pp. 189–351. ISBN 9780521200943.
- Mitchell, Colin P. (2009). The Practice of Politics in Safavid Iran: Power, Religion and Rhetoric. I.B.Tauris. pp. 1–304. ISBN 978-0857715883.

Preceded by Mirza Lotf Allah Shirazi	Grand vizier of the Safavid Empire; 1591-1610/1	Succeeded by Mirza Taleb Khan Ordubadi
