= Mirza Salman Jaberi =

Safavid grand vizier in 1577–1583

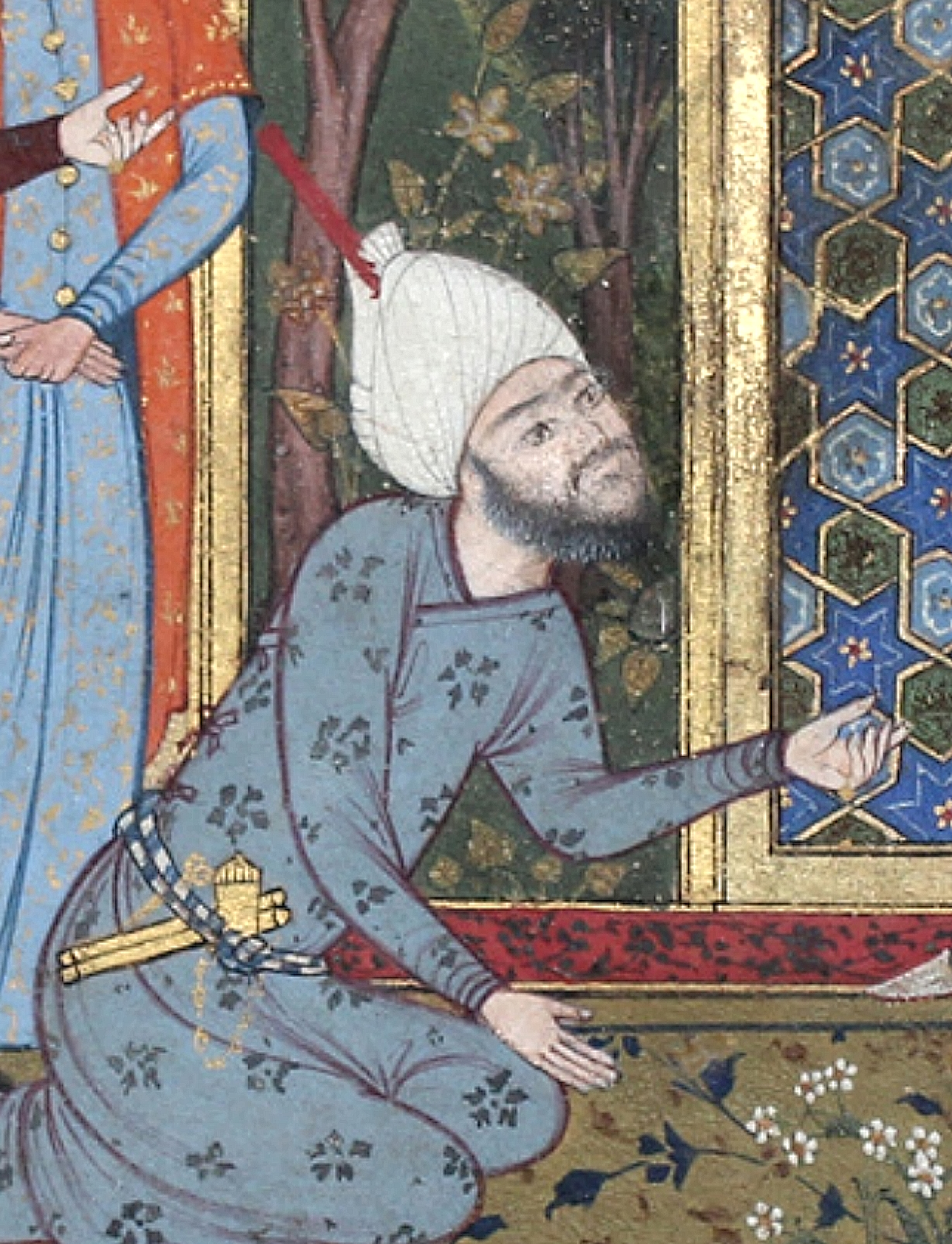
- Mirza Salman Jaberi in the Būstān of Saʿdi (1579). (Note: "In the illustration, the kneeling Mirza Salman, as the newcomer, pleads his case before the king" in Soudavar 2014, p. 226, Fig.9)

Grand Vizier of Safavid Iran
- In office 1577–1583
- Monarchs: Ismail II; Mohammad Khodabanda
- Preceded by: Mirza Shokrollah Isfahani
- Succeeded by: Mirza Hedayatollah

Personal details
- Died: May 1583 Herat, Khorasan, Iran
- Relations: Agha Mirza Ali Jaberi (father)
- Children: Mirza Abdallah Jaberi
- Family: Jaberi Ansari family

Military service
- Allegiance: Safavid Iran
- Years of service: 1540s–1583
- Battles/wars: Ottoman–Safavid War (1578–90)

Mirza Salman Jaberi Isfahani (Persian: میرزا سلمان جابری اصفهانی; also spelled Jabiri) was a prominent statesman in Safavid Iran, who served as the grand vizier of Ismail II (r. 1576–77) and Mohammad Khodabanda (r. 1577–1588).

== Background and rise ==
Mirza Salman Jaberi was the son of Agha Mirza Ali Jaberi, and belonged to the Jaberi Ansari family of Isfahan, which had earlier served the Aq Qoyunlu, and was descended from the famous Persian Sufi poet Khvajeh Abdollah Ansari. Mirza Salman had received his education in administration at Shiraz under the guidance of his father, who then served as the vizier of the city's governor, Ebrahim Khan Zu'l-Qadar. After his father's death in 1548, Mirza Salman left for the Safavid capital of Qazvin, where he entered the service of Shah Tahmasp I (r. 1524–1576) as a result of patronage by the prominent vizier of the Azerbaijan province, Mirza Ata-Allah Isfahani. There Mirza Salman served as an "intimate" (moqarrab), and "supervisor of the departments in the service of the royal household" (nāẓer-e boyutāt-e sarkār-e khāṣṣeh-ye sharifa).

On 14 May 1576, Tahmasp I died—a dynastic war shortly ensued between his two sons Haydar Mirza and Ismail Mirza, where the latter emerged victorious with the aid of his half-sister, Pari Khan Khanum. Ismail Mirza ascended to the crown under the dynastic name of Ismail II on 22 August 1576. On 13 June 1577, Mirza Salman was appointed by Ismail II as his grand vizier, thus succeeding Mirza Shokrollah Isfahani.

== Term as grand vizier ==
=== Under Ismail II ===
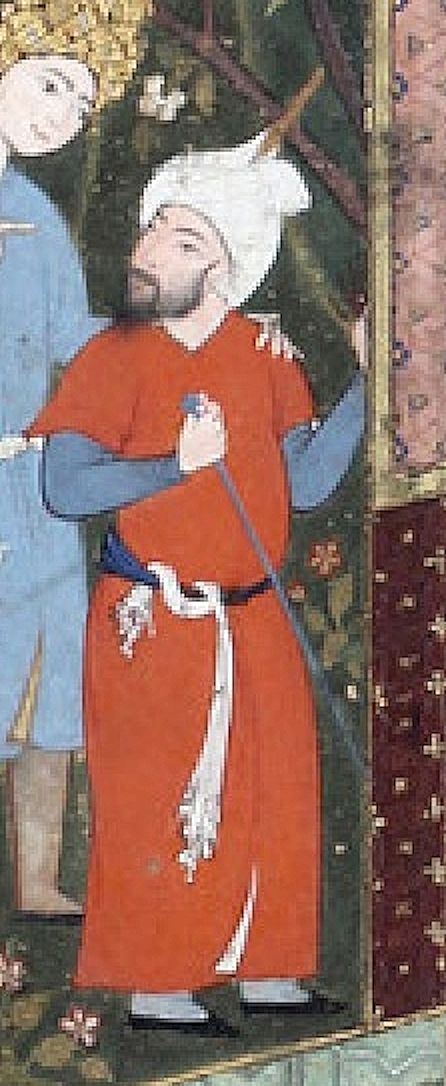
Depiction of Mirza Salman Jaberi, in his Bustan (1579). (Note: "As witness to the shah’s sinister ploy, Mirza Salman stands in the doorway holding a ministerial staff" in Soudavar 2014, p. 214, Fig.6)

Ismail II's 19 years of imprisonment in the Qahqaheh Castle had affected him heavily, and thus he was not inclined to allow displays of authority by any other individual at his own cost, which made him alienate Pari Khan Khanum and the Qizilbash. On 24 November 1577, Ismail II was poisoned by the concubines of the harem under the orders of Pari Khan Khanum, which resulted in his death. In order to prevent another anarchy from taking place in the country, Mirza Salman speedily convinced the Qizilbash chieftains to vow a pledge of friendship. Alarmed that the announcement of Ismail II's death would start discontent in the capital, the aristocracy kept the doors of the palace locked until a resolution was reached about the succession. According to some accounts, after Ismail II's death a group of statesmen asked Pari Khan Khanum to succeed her brother, which she, however, declined.

In order to clear up the succession crisis, the Qizilbash chieftains agreed to appoint the future shah after a conference with each other and then notify Pari Khan Khanum of their settled choice. At first, they discussed the resolution that Shoja al-Din Mohammad Safavi, the eight-month-old infant son of Ismail II, should be crowned as shah while in reality state affairs would be taken care of by Pari Khan Khanum. This suggestion, however, did not get the approval of most of the assembly since it would have swayed the balance of power among many Qizilbash clans. Ultimately the assembly agreed to appoint Mohammad Khodabanda, the elder brother of Ismail II, as shah—a decision which was supported by Mirza Salman.

The appointment of Mohammad Khodabanda was also supported and approved by Pari Khan Khanum, due to him being a man of old age, almost blind, and pleasure-seeking. Thus he was the appropriate successor, so Pari Khan Khanum could take advantage of his weakness and rule herself. She made an agreement with the Qizilbash chieftains that Mohammad Khodabanda would remain shah in name, whilst her and her envoys would continue controlling the interests of the state.

=== Under Mohammad Khodabanda ===
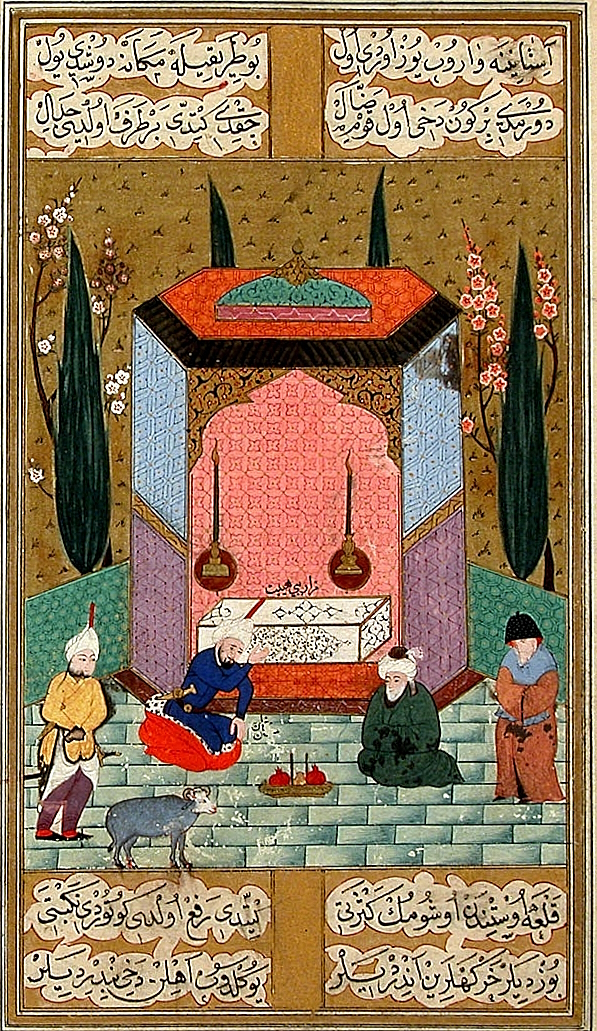
Mirza Salman Jaberi's visit to the Bibi-Heybat mausoleum in Baku, circa 1580. Şeca'atname (1598)

When Khodabanda ascended the throne, he confirmed Mirza Salman as the grand vizier. Mirza Salman, who was aware of what was happening in the changing circumstances, was shortly deserted by Pari Khan Khanum, who became the practical ruler of Safavid Iran. She was, however, murdered the following month at the instigation of Khodabanda's Mazandarani wife, Khayr al-Nisa Begum, who was better known by her title of Mahd-e Olya.

Mirza Salman became a close ally of Mahd-e Olya, who became the de facto ruler of the country. One of her primary intents was to have her favourite son, Hamza Mirza, ascend the throne in the future. Mirza Salman, who was aware of this, sought to gain more influence and authority by giving his daughter in marriage to Hamzeh Mirza. Furthermore, in August 1580, he managed to have Hamzeh Mirza's vizier Hossein Beg Shamlu dismissed and took over the office himself. He later appointed his son Mirza Abdallah Jaberi as the latter's vizier.

The shah relied increasingly on Mirza Salman who positioned himself as a "lord of the sword and the pen". This was further manifested in 1581, when he acted as a principal architect of a critical diplomatic arrangement, wherein the Georgian rulers—Simon I of Kartli and Alexander II of Kakheti—resumed their allegiance to the shah, undermining the Ottoman position in this part of the Caucasus region. Mirza Salman's authority and influence continued to grow, which in turn made the antagonism of the Qizilbash towards him increase. Mirza Salman was not fond of the Qizilbash either, whom he deemed "thorns in the rose-garden of his felicity". He treated them in an unfavourable fashion, and considered how possibly could deprive them of their power. Mirza Salman's foreign policy in Khorasan (references such as Kholasat al-tawariko and Noqawat al-athar highlights his curb over the Qizilbash chieftains) played a major role in start of the plot against him organized by the qurchi-bashi (head of the royal bodyguard) Qoli Beg Afshar, the mohrdar (seal holder), Shahrokh Khan Zu'l-Qadar, and Mohammad Khan Torkman.

==== Death ====
On 12 May 1583, the Qizilbash chieftains sent assassins after Mirza Salman, who had left for the nearby village of Gazorgah, where he arranged a feast in memory of his forebear, Khvajeh Abdollah Ansari. He was, however, informed of the Qizilbash plot to murder him, and speedily went back to Herat, where he found refuge in a madreseh, which had been used as royal accommodation by Mohammad Khodabanda and Hamzeh Mirza. Mirza Salman was killed by the Qizilbash chieftains in Bagh-e Zaghan—his head was sent to the Qizilbash governor of Herat, Ali Qoli Khan Shamlu, whilst his body was hung in front of the inhabitants of the city. His body was later buried in Mashhad under the order of the military judge Mir Abol-Vali Inju. Another Isfahan-born nobleman, Mirza Hedayatollah, succeeded him as grand vizier.

== Legacy ==
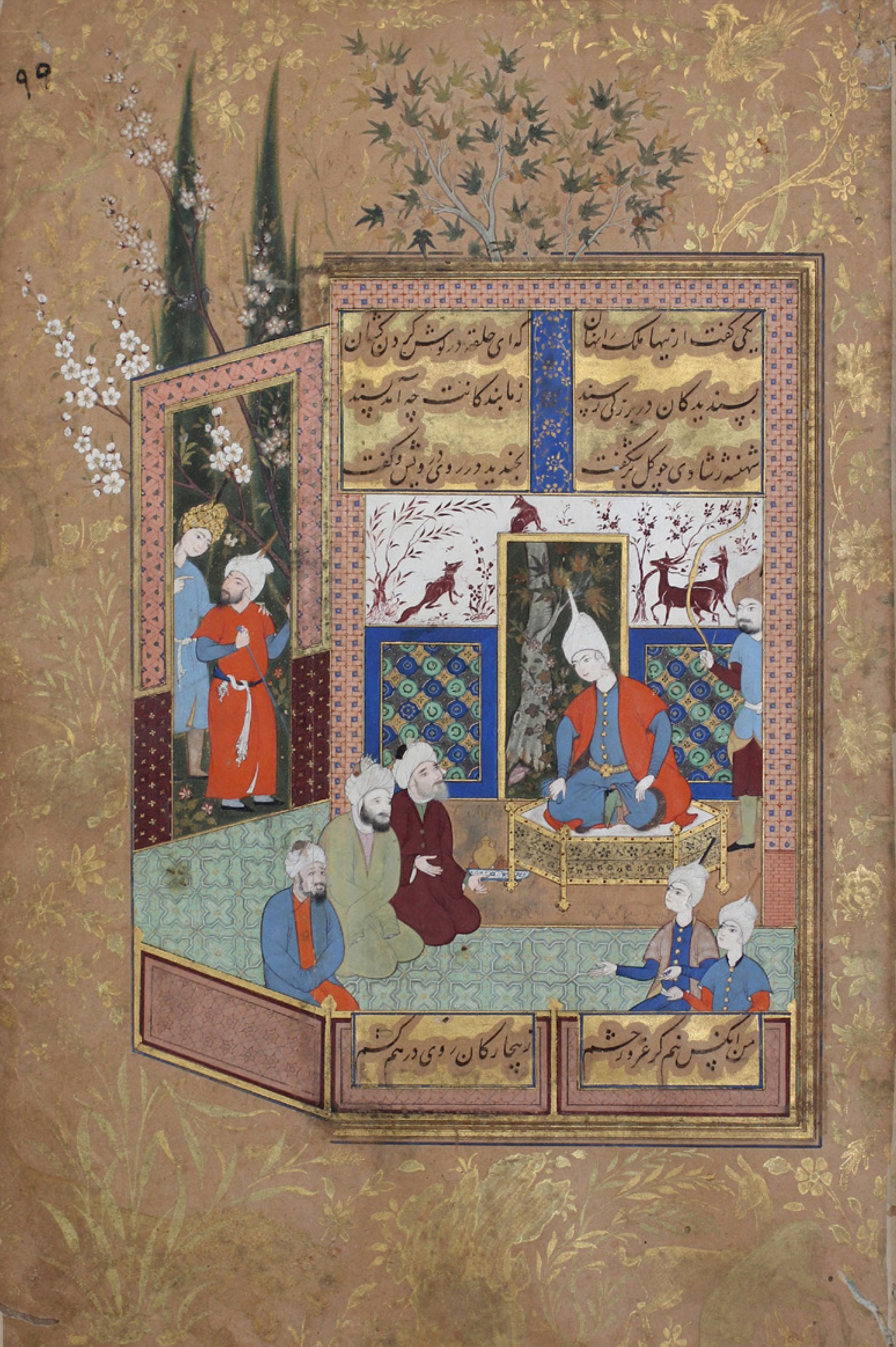
The Syrian king and the apprehensive dervishes by Muhammadi. Miniature from the copy of Bustan by Sa'di made in 1579 under the patronage of Mirza Salman Jaberi. E.M. Soudavar Trust Collection

Mirza Salman was a prominent and influential statesman of his age, which gained him the title of E'temad-e daulat ("Pillar of the State"), and made historians compare him to Asif ibn Barkhiya, who was the vizier of Solomon in the Quran. Later Safavid chronicles rated Mirza Salman with several prominent Iranian statesmen—the Seljuq vizier Nizam al-Mulk, the Ilkhanate viziers Shams al-Din Juvayni and Rashid al-Din Hamadani, and the early Safavid vakil (vicegerent) Najm-e Sani.

== Sources ==
- Gholsorkhi, Shohreh (1995). "Pari Khan Khanum: A Masterful Safavid Princess". Iranian Studies. 28 (3/4): 143–156. doi:10.1080/00210869508701833. ISBN 0-85773-181-5. JSTOR 4310940.
- Newman, Andrew J. (2008). Safavid Iran: Rebirth of a Persian Empire. I.B.Tauris. pp. 1–281. ISBN 9780857716613.
- Savory, Roger (2007). Iran under the Safavids. Cambridge University Press. pp. 1–288. ISBN 978-0521042512.
- Roemer, H.R. (1986). "The Safavid period". The Cambridge History of Iran, Volume 5: The Timurid and Safavid periods. Cambridge: Cambridge University Press. pp. 189–351. ISBN 9780521200943.
- Blow, David (2009). Shah Abbas: The Ruthless King Who became an Iranian Legend. London, UK: I. B. Tauris & Co. Ltd. ISBN 978-1-84511-989-8. LCCN 2009464064.
- Matthee, Rudi (2011). Persia in Crisis: Safavid Decline and the Fall of Isfahan. I.B.Tauris. pp. 1–371. ISBN 978-0857731814.
- Mitchell, Colin P. (2009). The Practice of Politics in Safavid Iran: Power, Religion and Rhetoric. I.B.Tauris. pp. 1–304. ISBN 978-0857715883.
- Mitchell, Colin Paul (2007). "Jāberi". Encyclopædia Iranica, Vol. XIV, Fasc. 3. pp. 313–314.
- Parsadust, Manuchehr (2009). "PARIḴĀN ḴĀNOM". Encyclopaedia Iranica.
- Savory, Roger (1964). "The Significance of the political murder of Mirzā Salmān Jāberi". Islamic Studies. 3 (2). Islamic Studies, vol. 3, no. 2: 181–191. JSTOR 20832740.
- Soudavar, Abolala (31 January 2014). "The Patronage of the Vizier Mirza Salman". Muqarnas Online. 30 (1): 213–234. doi:10.1163/22118993-0301P0010.

Preceded by Mirza Shokrollah Isfahani	Grand vizier of Safavid Iran; 1577–1583	Succeeded by Mirza Hedayatollah
