= Khalifeh family =

Iranian family of Golbar, Isfahan

The Khalifeh family (Persian: خاندان خلیفه‌), also known as the Khalifeh sayyids, were a branch of the Marashi dynasty of Mazandaran, whose ancestor, Amir Nezam al-Din, had settled in the Golbar quarter of Isfahan in the 15th century.

Even though the Khalifeh family was renowned as being descendants of the celebrated Marashi ruler Mir-i Buzurg (r. 1359–1362), they first became one of the leading families of Isfahan in the late 16th century. But they were still affluent and distinguished enough to intermarry with local well-known families. According to the Safavid court historian Iskandar Munshi, "The Khalifeh family had held estates in the Isfahan area for generations."

== Sources ==
- Blow, David (2009). Shah Abbas: The Ruthless King Who became an Iranian Legend. London, UK: I. B. Tauris & Co. Ltd. ISBN 978-1-84511-989-8. LCCN 2009464064.
- Matthee, Rudi (2011). Persia in Crisis: Safavid Decline and the Fall of Isfahan. I.B.Tauris. pp. 1–371. ISBN 978-0857731814.
- Babaie, Sussan (2004). Slaves of the Shah: New Elites of Safavid Iran. I.B.Tauris. pp. 1–218. ISBN 9781860647215.
- Matthee, Rudi (2010). "ḴALIFA SOLṬĀN". Encyclopaedia Iranica, Vol. XV, Fasc. 4. pp. 382–384.
- Newman, Andrew J. (2008). Safavid Iran: Rebirth of a Persian Empire. I.B.Tauris. pp. 1–281. ISBN 9780857716613.
- Savory, Roger (2007). Iran under the Safavids. Cambridge University Press. pp. 1–288. ISBN 978-0521042512.
- Roemer, H.R. (1986). "The Safavid period". The Cambridge History of Iran, Volume 5: The Timurid and Safavid periods. Cambridge: Cambridge University Press. pp. 189–351. ISBN 9780521200943.
- Floor, Willem (2005), "A Note on The Grand Vizierate in Seventeenth Century Persia", Zeitschrift der Deutschen Morgenländischen Gesellschaft, 155 (2), Harrassowitz Verlag: 435–481, JSTOR 43382107
- Nashat, Guity; Beck, Lois (2003). Women in Iran from the Rise of Islam to 1800. University of Illinois Press. pp. 1–253. ISBN 978-0-252-07121-8.
