= Mirza Jan Beg Khuzani =

Darugha (prefect) of Isfahan
- In office 1530/31 – After 1548/49

Personal details
- Died: After 1549
- Children: 4, Among them; Mirza Hedayatollah
- Parent: Najm-e Sani (father)
- Family: Khuzani

Mirza Jan Beg Khuzani was a bureaucrat in Safavid Iran, who served as the darugha (prefect) of Isfahan in the middle 16th century.

== Biography ==
A member of the Khuzani family, he was the son of Najm-e Sani. After the death of his father in 1512, he was raised by his uncle. In 1530/31, he was appointed as the darugha (prefect) of Isfahan, possibly succeeding his uncle. By 1548/49, he still served as darugha, and was the head of the family. Contrary to his father, he was seemingly only active in Isfahan. His date of death is unknown.

He was the father of Mirza Yar Ahmad Khuzani, Mirza Hedayatollah, Najm al-Din Mahmud Beg and an unnamed daughter.

== Sources ==
- Haneda, Masashi (1989). "La famille Ḫūzānī d'Isfahan (15e-17e siècles)". Studia Iranica. 18 (1): 77–92. doi:10.2143/SI.18.1.2014575.
