= Gharib Shah =

Sultan Kalanjar (Persian: کالنجار سلطان), better known as Gharib Shah (غریب شاه), was an Iranian aristocrat who rebelled against Safavid rule in 1629/30, but was defeated and later executed.

== Biography ==
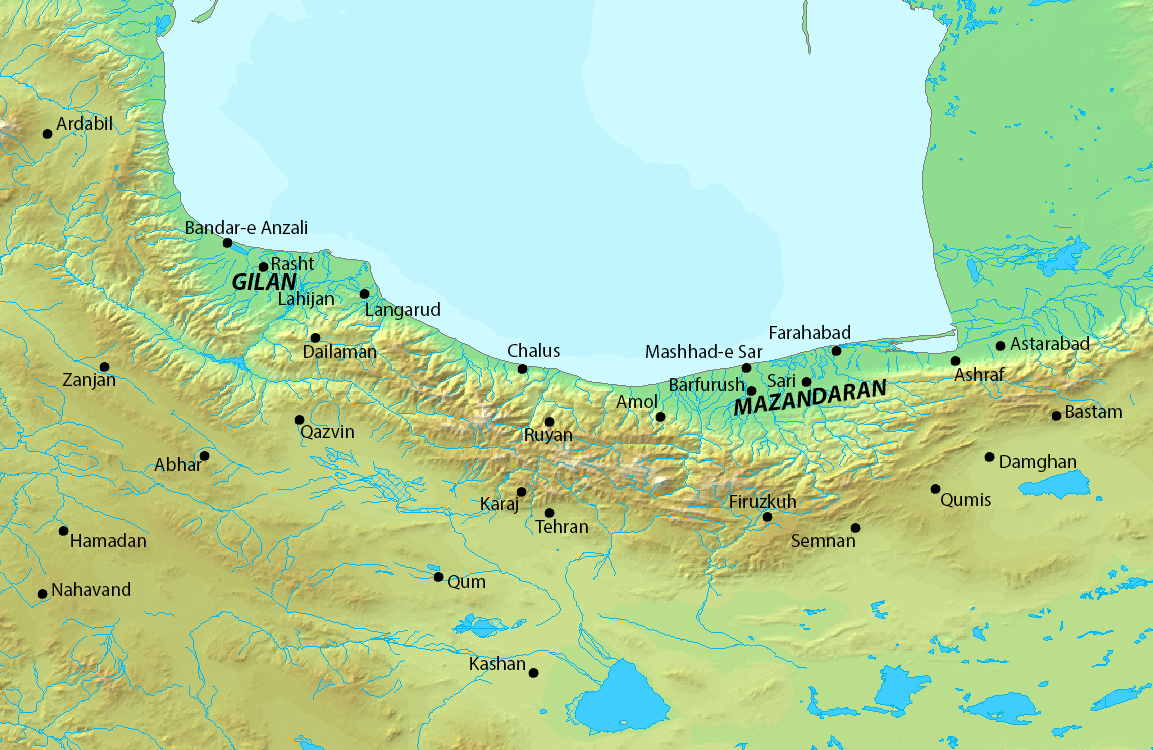
Map of northern Iran.

A native of Gilan, Gharib Shah was a descendant of the Kia'i dynasty, and his original name was Sultan Kalanjar, but when he in 1629/30 rebelled against Safavid rule in his home-province, he took the name of Adil Shah, while he was called Gharib Shah by his enemies. Before Gharib Shah rebelled, he had received the blessing of a certain Pir Shams-i Gulgiluva'i.

During his rebellion, he was joined by various descendants of dynasties of Mazandaran and Gilan. After having declared himself as the ruler of Gilan, he occupied the provinces two major cities, Lahijan and Rasht. When Gharib's rebellion spread to Mazandaran, the rebels sacked Shah Abbas' warehouses, selling off the royal silk. Two hundred kharvari were lost or stolen.

According to the Tarikh-i Gilan, by Abd al-Fattah Fumani, Gilan's inhabitants lost over 300,000 tumans, due to this rebellion. Consequently, Gharib Shah was eventually defeated by a group of Safavid governors, which included Saru Taqi, the governor of Gilan and Mazandaran. Gharib Shah, along with 2,000 of his supporters, were then executed at Isfahan. However, a supporter of Gharib Shah who claimed that he was his brother, rebelled in Mazandaran.

== Sources ==
- Blow, David (2009). Shah Abbas: The Ruthless King Who became an Iranian Legend. London, UK: I. B. Tauris & Co. Ltd. ISBN 978-1-84511-989-8. LCCN 2009464064.
- Matthee, Rudi (2011). Persia in Crisis: Safavid Decline and the Fall of Isfahan. I.B.Tauris. pp. 1–371. ISBN 978-0857731814.
- Babaie, Sussan (2004). Slaves of the Shah: New Elites of Safavid Iran. I.B.Tauris. pp. 1–218. ISBN 9781860647215.
- Newman, Andrew J. (2008). Safavid Iran: Rebirth of a Persian Empire. I.B.Tauris. pp. 1–281. ISBN 9780857716613.
- Matthee, Rudi (1999). The Politics of Trade in Safavid Iran: Silk for Silver, 1600-1730. Cambridge University Press. pp. 1–290. ISBN 0521641314.
