= Amir Zakariya =

First Safavid grand vizier from 1501 to 1507

- امیر زکریا

Grand Vizier of the Aq Qoyunlu Grand Vizier of the Safavid Empire
- In office 1501–1507 Co-leading with Mahmud Jan Daylami (1502/03–1507)
- Monarchs: Alvand Beg (r. 1497–1504/5); Ismail I (r. 1501–1524)
- Preceded by: Safavid Empire established
- Succeeded by: Najm-e Sani

Personal details
- Born: Tabriz, Aq Qoyunlu
- Died: Tabriz, Safavid Iran

Khvajeh Mohammad Kujuji Tabrizi (Persian: خواجه محمد کججی تبریزی), better known by his later title of Amir Zakariya, was a Persian bureaucrat from the Kujuji family, who initially served as the vizier under the Aq Qoyunlu ruler Alvand Beg, and then under the Safavid shah (king) Ismail I (r. 1501–1524) from 1501 to 1507.

== Sources ==
- Jackson, Peter (1986). The Cambridge History of Iran, Volume 6. Cambridge University Press.
- Markiewicz, Christopher (2019). The Crisis of Kingship in Late Medieval Islam: Persian Emigres and the Making of Ottoman Sovereignty. Cambridge University Press.
- Mitchell, Colin P. (2009). The Practice of Politics in Safavid Iran: Power, Religion and Rhetoric. I.B.Tauris. pp. 1–304. ISBN 978-0857715883.
- Newman, Andrew J. (2008). Safavid Iran: Rebirth of a Persian Empire. I.B.Tauris. pp. 1–296. ISBN 978-0857716613.

Grand Vizier of the Safavid Empire; 1501–1507	Succeeded by Najm-e Sani
