= Mirza Hedayatollah =

Safavid grand vizier in 1583–86

Mostowfi ol-mamalek (comptroller general)
- In office 1577–1583
- Monarchs: Ismail II, Mohammad Khodabanda
- Preceded by: Mirza Shah Ghari
- Succeeded by: Mirza Mohammad

Grand vizier of Safavid Iran
- In office 1583–1586
- Monarch: Mohammad Khodabanda
- Preceded by: Mirza Salman Jaberi
- Succeeded by: Mirza Mohammad Monshi

Personal details
- Relations: Mirza Jan Beg Khuzani (father); Mirza Yar Ahmad Khuzani (brother)
- Family: Khuzani family

Mirza Hedayatollah (Persian: میرزا هدایت‌الله) was a bureaucrat in Safavid Iran, who served as the grand vizier of Mohammad Khodabanda (r. 1578–1587) from 1583 to 1586. Before his promotion, he had served as the mostowfi ol-mamalek (comptroller general) since 1577. After his tenure as grand vizier, he was appointed as the fiscal manager of Isfahan. Under the rule of Shah Abbas I (r. 1587–1629), the distribution of tuyul (land grants) within the royal camp were overseen by Mirza Hedayatolllah. During Shah Abbas I's pilgrimage to Mashhad in 1601–1602, Mirza Hedayatollah accompanied the royal party and conducted a measurement of the route from Isfahan.

A member of the Khuzani family, Mirza Hedayatollah was a son of Mirza Jan Beg Khuzani. During this period, Mirza Hedayatollah likely acted as the main representative of the family in Isfahan, as his brother Mirza Yar Ahmad Khuzani had moved to Sistan in 1556/57 to serve as the vizier of Badi-al Zaman Mirza Safavi.

== Sources ==
- Floor, Willem (2001). Safavid Government Institutions. Mazda Publishers. ISBN 978-1568591353.
- Haneda, Masashi (1989). "La famille Ḫūzānī d'Isfahan (15e-17e siècles)". Studia Iranica. 18 (1): 77–92. doi:10.2143/SI.18.1.2014575.
- Mitchell, Colin P. (2009). The Practice of Politics in Safavid Iran: Power, Religion and Rhetoric. I.B.Tauris. ISBN 978-0857715883.

Preceded by Mirza Salman Jaberi	Grand vizier of Safavid Iran; 1583–1586	Succeeded by Mirza Mohammad Monshi
