= Salman Khan Ustajlu =

16–17th-century Iranian military leader

Grand Vizier of the Safavid Empire
- In office 1621–1623/24
- Monarchs: Abbas the Great (r. 1588–1629)
- Preceded by: Mirza Taleb Khan Ordubadi
- Succeeded by: Khalifeh Soltan

Personal details
- Died: 1623/24 Safavid Iran

Salman Khan Ustajlu (Persian: سلمان‌خان استاجلو) was a Turkoman military leader from the Ustajlu tribe, who became a powerful and rich figure during his service in Safavid Iran. He briefly served as the grand vizier of the Safavid king (shah) Abbas I (r. 1588–1629) from 1621 until his death in 1623/24. He was succeeded by Khalifeh Soltan.

== Sources ==
- Kasheff, Manouchehr (2001). "GĪLĀN v. History under the Safavids". Encyclopaedia Iranica, Vol. X, Fasc. 6. pp. 635–642.
- Newman, Andrew J. (2008). Safavid Iran: Rebirth of a Persian Empire. I.B.Tauris. pp. 1–281. ISBN 9780857716613.
- Nashat, Guity; Beck, Lois (2003). Women in Iran from the Rise of Islam to 1800. University of Illinois Press. pp. 1–253. ISBN 978-0-252-07121-8.

Vacant Title last held by Hamzeh Khan Ustajlu	Chief Justice (Divan-beigi) of the Safavid Empire; 1582	Vacant Title next held by Ali-qoli Khan Ustajlu
Preceded by Mirza Taleb Khan Ordubadi	Grand vizier of the Safavid Empire; 1621-1623/4	Succeeded by Khalifeh Sultan
