= Mirza Jafar Savaji =

Safavid grand vizier from 1525 to 1531

Grand Vizier of the Safavid Empire
- In office 1525–1531
- Monarch: Tahmasp I (r. 1524–1576)
- Preceded by: Qadi Jahan Qazvini
- Succeeded by: Ahmad Beg Nur Kamal

Personal details
- Relations: Savaji family

Mirza Jafar Savaji (Persian: میرزا جعفر ساوجی) was a bureaucrat in Safavid Iran, who served as the grand vizier of Tahmasp I (r. 1524–1576) from 1525 to 1531. With his appointment, the Savaji family to a degree established their presence in the Safavid administration. Mirza Jafar's appointment was unsustainable due to the internal conflict of the court. He had previously served as the governor of Isfahan.

In the fall of 1531, the vakil (regent) Hoseyn Khan Shamlu initiated a purge in the administration and appointed his own personal vizier Ahmad Beg Nur Kamal as the grand vizier. Mirza Jafar was arrested and soon executed.

== Sources ==
- Floor, Willem (2001). Safavid Government Institutions. Mazda Publishers. ISBN 978-1568591353.
- Newman, Andrew J. (2008). Safavid Iran: Rebirth of a Persian Empire. I.B.Tauris. ISBN 978-0857716613.
- Mitchell, Colin P. (2009). The Practice of Politics in Safavid Iran: Power, Religion and Rhetoric. I.B.Tauris. ISBN 978-0857715883.

Preceded by Qadi Jahan Qazvini	Grand vizier of Safavid Iran; 1525–1531	Succeeded by Ahmad Beg Nur Kamal
