= Majles-Nevis =

Official record keeper in Safavid Iran

The Majles-Nevis (Persian: مجلس‌نویس), also known as the vaqaye-nevis and vaqaye-negar, was the official record keeper in Safavid Iran.

When the grand vizier was away, the majles-nevis served as his substitute. He had to inform the privy council and the shah of the events taking place in the nation. He had his own provincial majles-nevis who kept him updated on such events. As the person responsible for learning about relations with other countries, treaties that were in effect, and other related subjects, he also served as sort of foreign minister. All visitors, including ambassadors, visited the majles-nevis and gave him their paperwork, which he filed.

The staff of the dar al-ensha (royal chancellery), which in 1637 included at least 40 scribes, supported both the majles-nevis and the monshi al-mamalek. The majles-nevis had three clerks until the reign of Suleiman I (r. 1666–1694), when the number was increased to thirty.

== List of majles-nevis ==
In his Safavid Government Institutions, the Dutch Iranologist Willem Floor listed the following figures as majles-nevis:

Name	Years
Mirak Beg Ordubadi	in the 1560s
Mir Monshi Hoseini	?–1576
Mirza Mohammad Monshi	1576–1577
Hatem Beg Ordubadi	1588–1589
Mir Feizollah	1609–11
Mir Mirza Taher	?–1621
Sayyed Emir Abu'l-Ma'ali	1621–1627
Mirza Mohammad Tuyserkani	1627–1629
Mirza Taleb Khan Ordubadi	1629–1631
Mirza Mohammad Tuyserkani	1631–1634
Mirza Ma'sum	1634–1642
Abu'l-Fazl Mirza Mohammad Taher Vahid	1642–1679
Mirza Mohammad Reza Ordubadi Nasiri	1679–1693
Mirza Abu'l Qasem Nasiri	1693–1698
Mirza Mohammad Ebrahim Nasiri	1669/1700–?
Mirza Hayat	?–1722
Mirza Sadeq	1722
Mirza Ali Naqi Nasiri	1729–1731

== Sources ==
- Floor, Willem (2001). Safavid Government Institutions. Mazda Publishers. ISBN 978-1568591353.
- Floor, Willem (2021). "The Safavid court and government". In Matthee, Rudi (ed.). The Safavid World. Routledge. pp. 203–224. ISBN 978-1138944060.
