= Khuzani family =

Prominent Iranian family (15th–17th centuries)

The Khuzani family (Persian: خاندان خوزانی)‌ was an Iranian family active in Isfahan during the 15th–17th centuries. Their family name is derived from village of Khuzan, now located in the Khomeynishahr city near Isfahan. The first member to settle in Khuzan was a certain Shah Mahmud, who had moved from Baghdad in the 1440s.

Khuzani family tree

Ghaffar Tayyar
Shah Mahmud
Najm-e Sani	Shah Bu Eshaq	Esfandiyar	Mirza Ata-Allah Isfahani
Mirza Jan Beg Khuzani	Nurollah	Abd al-Ghani	Shah Vali	Mirza Ahmad	Batham Beg
Khvajeh Sa'd al-Din Enayat Khuzani	Mirza Shah Vali
Mirza Yar Ahmad Khuzan	Mirza Hedayatollah	Najm al-Din Mahmud Beg	Unnamed daughter	Masih Khvajeh Ruhollah
Mirza Beg	Fathollah	Asad Beg	Zayn al-Abidin Beg
Fazli Isfahani Khuzani

Other Khuzani members with unknown family origins: Rais Shihab al-Din, Khvajeh Enayatollah, Mirza Enayat ibn Mirza Mo'men.

== Sources ==
- Haneda, Masashi (1989). "La famille Ḫūzānī d'Isfahan (15e-17e siècles)". Studia Iranica. 18 (1): 77–92. doi:10.2143/SI.18.1.2014575.
- Quiring-Zoche, Rosemarie (1980). Isfahan im 15. und 16. Jahrhundert: Ein Beitrag zur persischen Stadtgeschichte. Islamkundliche Untersuchungen (in German). Berlin: Klaus Schwarz Verlag.
