= Ahmad Beg Nur Kamal =

Safavid grand vizier from 1531 to 1533/34

Grand Vizier of the Safavid Empire
- In office 1531–1533/34
- Monarch: Tahmasp I (r. 1524–1576)
- Preceded by: Mirza Jafar Savaji
- Succeeded by: Khvajeh Sa'd al-Din Enayat Khuzani; Khvajeh Mo'en Yazdi

Personal details
- Relations: Nur Kamaliya family

Ahmad Beg Nur Kamal (Persian: احمد بیگ نور کمال) was a bureaucrat in Safavid Iran, who served as the grand vizier of Tahmasp I (r. 1524–1576) from 1531 to 1533/34.

A native of Isfahan, Nur Kamal was of Persian origin. He is the only known member of the Nur Kamaliya, an important family in Isfahan. Prior to becoming the grand vizier, he had served as the personal vizier of Hoseyn Khan Shamlu in Khorasan. In the fall of 1531, Hoseyn Khan Shamlu initiated a purge in the administration and appointed Ahmad Beg Nur Kamal as the grand vizier, thus replacing Mirza Jafar Savaji. During the downfall of Hoseyn Khan Shamlu in 1533/34, Nur Kamal was arrested, tortured and lost all his property. He was later freed. The vizierate was given jointly to Khvajeh Sa'd al-Din Enayat Khuzani and Khvajeh Mo'en Yazdi.

== Sources ==
- Floor, Willem (2001). Safavid Government Institutions. Mazda Publishers. ISBN 978-1568591353.
- Newman, Andrew J. (2008). Safavid Iran: Rebirth of a Persian Empire. I.B.Tauris. ISBN 978-0857716613.
- Mitchell, Colin P. (2009). The Practice of Politics in Safavid Iran: Power, Religion and Rhetoric. I.B.Tauris. ISBN 978-0857715883.
- Quiring-Zoche, Rosemarie (1980). Isfahan im 15. und 16. Jahrhundert: Ein Beitrag zur persischen Stadtgeschichte. Islamkundliche Untersuchungen (in German). Berlin: Klaus Schwarz Verlag.

Preceded by Mirza Jafar Savaji	Grand vizier of Safavid Iran; 1531–1533/34	Succeeded by Khvajeh Sa'd al-Din Enayat Khuzani & Khvajeh Mo'en Yazdi
