= Mirza Taleb Khan Ordubadi =

Safavid grand vizier in 1610/11–1621 and 1632–1633

Grand Vizier of the Safavid Empire
- In office 1610/11–1621
- Monarch: Abbas the Great (r. 1588–1629)
- Preceded by: Hatem Beg Ordubadi
- Succeeded by: Salman Khan Ustajlu
- In office 1632–1633
- Monarch: Shah Safi (r. 1629–1642)
- Preceded by: Khalifeh Soltan
- Succeeded by: Saru Taqi

Personal details
- Died: 1633 Safavid Iran
- Parent: Hatem Beg Ordubadi (father)
- Religion: Twelver Shia Islam

Mirza Taleb Khan Ordubadi (Persian: میرزا طالب خان اردوبادی) was an Iranian aristocrat from the Ordubadi family, who served as the grand vizier of the Safavid king (shah) Abbas I (r. 1588–1629) from to 1610/11 to 1621, and later as grand vizier of his grandson and successor Safi (r. 1629–1642) from 1632 to 1633.

== Biography ==
Mirza Taleb was the son of Hatem Beg Ordubadi, and thus belonged to the Ordubadi family, an Iranian family which was descended from the medieval philosopher and polymath Nasir al-Din al-Tusi. Furthermore, Mirza Taleb was the brother-in-law of the governor of Qandahar, Ali Mardan Khan. In 1610/1, Mirza Taleb was appointed as the grand vizier of Abbas I, thus succeeding his father. He was later replaced by Salman Khan Ustajlu in 1621. In 1632, Mirza Taleb was reappointed as grand vizier by Abbas I's grandson and successor Safi, succeeding the former grand vizier Khalifeh Soltan. A year later, Mirza Taleb was dishonored by Saru Taqi, who then had him secretly assassinated.

The reason behind these actions was due to Saru Taqi's personal hatred towards Mirza Taleb Khan's family, whose father had denied Saru Taqi's father a post he had sought. Furthermore, Saru Taqi took over Mirza Taleb's house in the capital, Isfahan.

== Sources ==
- Blow, David (2009). Shah Abbas: The Ruthless King Who became an Iranian Legend. London, UK: I. B. Tauris & Co. Ltd. ISBN 978-1-84511-989-8. LCCN 2009464064.
- Matthee, Rudi (2011). Persia in Crisis: Safavid Decline and the Fall of Isfahan. I.B.Tauris. pp. 1–371. ISBN 978-0857731814.
- Babaie, Sussan (2004). Slaves of the Shah: New Elites of Safavid Iran. I.B.Tauris. pp. 1–218. ISBN 9781860647215.
- Newman, Andrew J. (2008). Safavid Iran: Rebirth of a Persian Empire. I.B.Tauris. pp. 1–281. ISBN 9780857716613.
- Roemer, H.R. (1986). "The Safavid period". The Cambridge History of Iran, Volume 5: The Timurid and Safavid periods. Cambridge: Cambridge University Press. pp. 189–351. ISBN 9780521200943.

| Preceded by Hatem Beg Ordubadi | Grand Vizier of the Safavid Empire; 1610/1 – 1621 | Succeeded by Salman Khan Ustajlu |
| Preceded by Khalifeh Sultan | Grand Vizier of the Safavid Empire; 1632 – 1633 | Succeeded by Saru Taqi |
