= Daylami family =

Prominent Iranian family

The Daylami family (Persian: خاندان دیلمی) was an Iranian family native to Persian Iraq and Gilan, who served the Turkmen Aq Qoyunlu and then later the Safavid dynasty.

== Sources ==
- Dunietz, Alexandra (2015). The Cosmic Perils of Qadi Ḥusayn Maybudī in Fifteenth-Century Iran. Brill. ISBN 978-9004302310.
- Markiewicz, Christopher (2019). The Crisis of Kingship in Late Medieval Islam: Persian Emigres and the Making of Ottoman Sovereignty. Cambridge University Press.
- Minorsky, Vladimir (1955). "The Aq-qoyunlu and Land Reforms". Bulletin of the School of Oriental and African Studies. 17 (3): 449–462. doi:10.1017/S0041977X00112376. JSTOR 609589. S2CID 154166838. (registration required)
- Mitchell, Colin P. (2009). The Practice of Politics in Safavid Iran: Power, Religion and Rhetoric. I.B.Tauris. pp. 1–304. ISBN 978-0857715883.
