= Qadi Jahan Qazvini =

Vizier of Safavid Iran from 1535 to 1551

Grand Vizier of the Safavid Empire
- In office 1534–1551 Co-leading with Mir Enayat Allah Khuzani Isfahani and Kvajeh Mo'en Yazdi from 1534 to 1535
- Monarch: Tahmasp I (r. 1524–1576)
- Preceded by: Ahmad Beg Nur Kamal
- Succeeded by: Mir Sharif Shirazi

Personal details
- Born: February 1483 Qazvin, Aq Qoyunlu
- Died: 1552/53 Qazvin, Safavid Iran

Qadi Jahan Qazvini (Persian: قاضی جهان قزوینی; 1483–1552/53) was a Persian bureaucrat who served as vizier of the Safavid shah (king) Tahmasp I (r. 1524–1576) from 1534 to 1551.

== Biography ==
Qadi Jahan was born in February 1483; he belonged to a well-known family of sayyids native to the city of Qazvin, located in Persian Iraq (Erāq-e Ajam), a region corresponding to western part of Iran. He was educated by the prominent philosopher Jalal al-Din Davani (died 1502) at the Madrasah-yi Mansuriyya in the southern city of Shiraz, and thus considered himself part of the Shirazi philosophical tradition.

In his early career, Qadi Jahan served as the qadi (chief judge) of his home city, and later as the vizier of the vakil (viceroy) Mirza Shah Hossein during the last years of the Safavid shah (king) Ismail I (r. 1501–1524). As a part of his plan to keep the Turkmen Qizilbash from the divan, shah Tahmasp I (r. 1524–1576) appointed Qadi Jahan as the new co-vizier together with Mir Enayat Allah Khuzani Isfahani in 1535. However, the two viziers were unable to cooperate, with Mir Enayat being executed a few months later. Qadi Jahan later retired in 1550 or 1551, and died a few years later, in 1552 or 1553.

== Sources ==
- Mitchell, Colin P. (2009). The Practice of Politics in Safavid Iran: Power, Religion and Rhetoric. I.B.Tauris. pp. 1–304. ISBN 978-0857715883.
- Newman, Andrew J. (2008). Safavid Iran: Rebirth of a Persian Empire. I.B.Tauris. pp. 1–296. ISBN 978-0857716613.
