= Saru Taqi =

Grand Vizier of Iran from 1633 to 1645

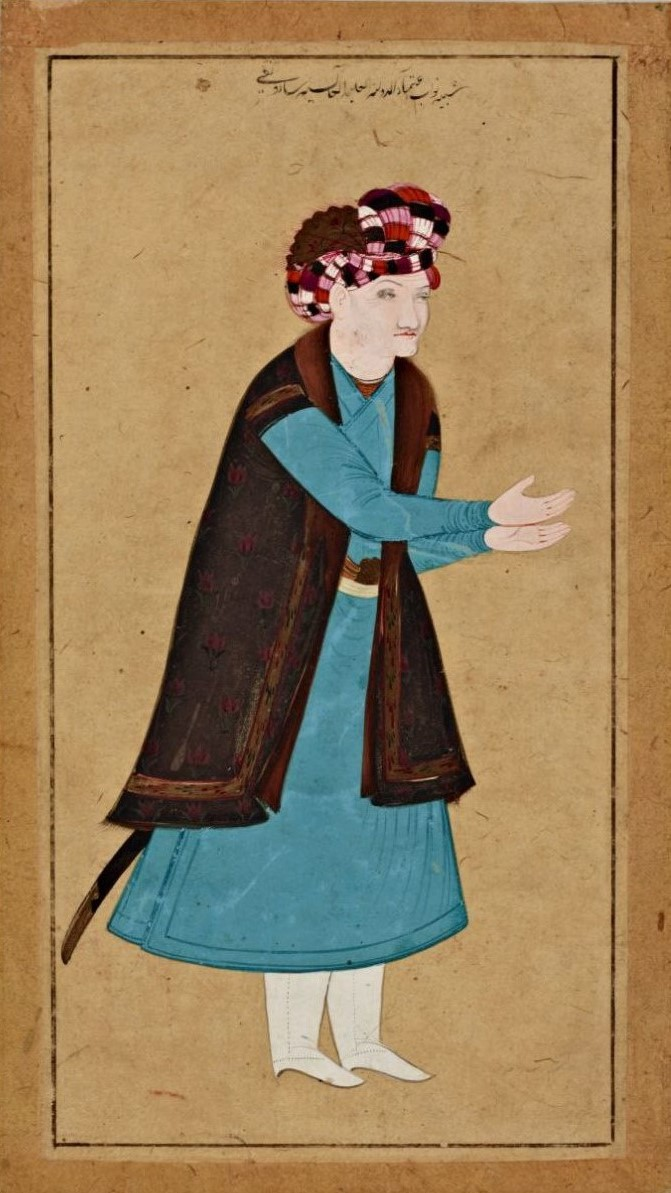
- Portrait of Saru Taqi, attributed to Mo'en Mosavver (or his school), Iran, before 1645

Grand Vizier of the Safavid Empire
- In office 1633 – 11 October 1645
- Monarchs: Shah Safi (r. 1629–1642); Abbas II (r. 1642–1666)
- Preceded by: Mirza Taleb Khan Ordubadi
- Succeeded by: Khalifeh Soltan

Personal details
- Born: 1579 Tabriz, Safavid Iran
- Died: 1645 (aged 65–66) Safavid Iran
- Religion: Twelver Shia Islam

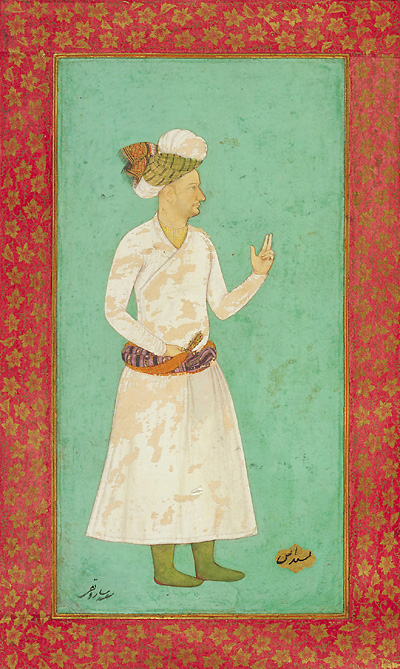
Mughal painting of Saru Taqi by Bishandas, c. 1618

Mirza Mohammad Taqi (Persian: میرزا محمد تقی; c. 1579 – 11 October 1645), better known as Saru Taqi (سارو تقی, lit: 'Taqi the blond') was a eunuch in Safavid Iran, who served as the Grand Vizier of the Safavid king (shah) Safi (r. 1629–1642) and the latter's son Abbas II (r. 1642–1666) until his assassination on 11 October 1645.

== Biography ==
=== Origins and early life ===
Saru Taqi was born in ca. 1579 in Tabriz to a poor middle-class Muslim family, which became disgraced after the death of his uncle Khwaja Qasim Ali. Saru Taqi served in the army during his youth in Isfahan, and was later appointed as the financial minister of the governor of Ardabil, Zu'l Fiqar Qaramanlu. Saru Taqi later served in the same office in Ganja and Shirvan, but was some time later appointed as the Grand of the governor of Karabakh. In 1615, Saru Taqi was castrated by the Safavid shah Abbas I after having been accused by a furrier named Mu'min of having forcibly had sex with him. His property was then taken, but it was later restored after Abbas I found out that the accusation was false.

One year later, Saru Taqi was appointed as the governor of Mazandaran, and one year after that, was appointed as the governor of Gilan. During his governorship of those two provinces, he laid foundation to many buildings and towns, such as Farahabad and Ashraf. In 1629, Abbas I died and was succeeded by his grandson Safi, whom Saru Taqi enjoyed good relations with. During the same year, Saru Taqi, along with other governors, suppressed the rebellion of Gharib Shah, which took place in Gilan and Mazandaran.

In 1631, Saru Taqi was sent to Baghdad to take part in the renovation of the Shia shrines. Two years later, Saru Taqi dishonored the Safavid Grand Vizier Mirza Talib Khan and secretly had him assassinated. The reason behind these actions was due to a personal hatred Saru Taqi had towards the family of Mirza Talib Khan, whose father Hatem Beg Ordubadi had denied to give Saru Taqi's father a post which he had asked for. Furthermore, Saru Taqi also took over the house of Mirza Talib Khan, which was in Isfahan, the capital of the Safavid Empire.

=== Vizierate under Safi (1633–1642) ===
Safi then appointed Saru Taqi as his new Grand Vizier. During the same year, Saru Taqi made a conspiracy against the powerful military officer Imam-Quli Khan, which resulted in the latter's death and his possessions being converted into the crown estate. In 1634, Saru Taqi appointed his brother Mohammad Saleh Beg as the governor of Mazandaran, thus reducing the power of the descendants of the Marashis, who were the elite of the province.

In 1638, Saru Taqi, who aimed to have Ali Mardan Khan, the governor of Qandahar, dismissed, demanded a large sum of money from him. After having been under pressure by Saru Taqi for some time, Ali Mardan Khan defected to the Mughal Empire of India. On 12 May 1642, Safi died.

=== Vizierate under Abbas II and death (1642–1645) ===
On 15 May 1642, at Kashan, Mohammad Mirza was crowned as the shah of Iran and chose "Abbas II" as his regnal name. Since he was less than 10 years old when he became shah, the job of governing Iran was placed in the hands of his mother, Anna Khanum, and Saru Taqi, while Abbas concentrated on his education at Qazvin. Saru Taqi and Anna Khanum worked closely together, and under them Iran was in secure hands. The French traveller Jean Chardin said the following thing about them:

The power of mothers of Persian kings looms large when they [shahs] are at a young age. Abbas II's mother had much influence, which was absolute. She [the queen mother] was in close contact with the prime minister and they would help each other. Saru Taqi was the agent and confidant of the queen mother; he would gather immense fortunes for her. She governed Persia at her will through her minister.

In 1643, Saru Taqi accused the powerful military commander (sipah-salar) Rostam Khan of treason, and had him executed. During the same year, the daughter of Saru Taqi's court ally Jani Khan, was given in marriage to his nephew. One year later, Saru Taqi enlarged the Ali Qapu Palace.

On 11 October 1645, Saru Taqi was betrayed and murdered in his own house by Jani Khan, most likely with the approval of Abbas II, who was trying to get independence from his mother and the slaves which supported her. When Anna Khanum heard of Saru Taqi's murder, she became extremely angry, and sent one of her eunuchs to Jani Khan in order to find out the reason behind the murder. Jani Khan then insulted both Anna Khanum and Saru Taqi, which four days later resulted in his death by an assassin sent by Anna Khanum. The successor of Saru Taqi was a Marashi descendant named Khalifeh Soltan, who had already served as Grand Vizier from 1623 to 1631.

== Legacy ==
Saru Taqi took part in the construction of many buildings, and is one of the most important builders of the Safavid era. One of these buildings was one of the most important Shia places, the Imam Ali Mosque, which Saru Taqi rebuilt. Furthermore, he also spent his own revenue to construct commercial and religious buildings, a mosque and a bazaar in Isfahan being of the examples.

== Notes ==
a: Although Saru Taqi had not served in the eunuch ranks since he had not been castrated at an early age, he can technically be considered a eunuch since his castration gave him access to the harem of the Safavid Empire.

== Sources ==
- Blow, David (2009). Shah Abbas: The Ruthless King Who became an Iranian Legend. London, UK: I. B. Tauris & Co. Ltd. ISBN 978-1-84511-989-8. LCCN 2009464064.
- Matthee, Rudi (2011). Persia in Crisis: Safavid Decline and the Fall of Isfahan. I.B.Tauris. pp. 1–371. ISBN 978-0857731814.
- Babaie, Sussan (2004). Slaves of the Shah: New Elites of Safavid Iran. I.B.Tauris. pp. 1–218. ISBN 9781860647215.
- Matthee, Rudi (2010). "ḴALIFA SOLṬĀN". Encyclopaedia Iranica, Vol. XV, Fasc. 4. pp. 382–384.
- Matthee, Rudi (2008). "JĀNI BEG KHAN BIGDELI ŠĀMLU". Encyclopaedia Iranica, Vol. XIV, Fasc. 5. pp. 544–545.
- Newman, Andrew J. (2008). Safavid Iran: Rebirth of a Persian Empire. I.B.Tauris. pp. 1–281. ISBN 9780857716613.
- Savory, Roger (2007). Iran under the Safavids. Cambridge University Press. pp. 1–288. ISBN 978-0521042512.
- Roemer, H.R. (1986). "The Safavid period". The Cambridge History of Iran, Volume 5: The Timurid and Safavid periods. Cambridge: Cambridge University Press. pp. 189–351. ISBN 9780521200943.
- Matthee, Rudi (1999). The Politics of Trade in Safavid Iran: Silk for Silver, 1600-1730. Cambridge University Press. pp. 1–290. ISBN 0521641314.

Preceded by Mirza Talib Khan	Grand Vizier of the Safavid Empire; 1633-1645	Succeeded by Khalifeh Soltan
