= Jaberi Ansari family =

The Jaberi Ansari family (Persian: خاندان جابری انصاری) was an Iranian family from Isfahan, whose members served as key figures in the nation's administrative and political leadership from pre-Safavid times through to the Islamic revolution of 1979.

== Sources ==
- Faghfoory, Mohammad H.; Floor, Willem M (2007). Dastur al-Moluk: A Safavid State Manual By Mirza Rafi Jaberi Ansari. Mazda Publishers. ISBN 978-1568591957.
