= Kujuji family =

Iranian family

The Kujuji family, also spelled Kujaji and Kukaji (Persian: کججی), was an Iranian noble-family native to Tabriz in Iran, and was present from the 15th century to the 18th-century. The first known mentioned member of the family is Amir Zakariya, an officer who originally served as vizier of the Aq Qoyunlu federation, but later changed his allegiance to the Safavid king (shah) Ismail I (r. 1501–1524), and was appointed as his vizier by him, thus becoming the first vizier of the Safavid Empire. Zakariya later died in 1512/3.

Jalal al-Din Mohammad Tabrizi was in 1523 appointed by Ismail as his vizier, but after Ismail's death in 1524, Jalal al-Din Mohammad was killed by a rebellious member of the Rumlu tribe, and was succeeded by Mirza Jafar Savaji. A nephew of Zakariya, Mohammad Beg Kujuji, served as the secretary of the Safavid prince Bahram Mirza Safavi.

== Sources ==
- Newman, Andrew J. (2008). Safavid Iran: Rebirth of a Persian Empire. I.B.Tauris. pp. 1–281. ISBN 9780857716613.
- Mitchell, Colin P. (2009). The Practice of Politics in Safavid Iran: Power, Religion and Rhetoric. I.B.Tauris. pp. 1–304. ISBN 978-0857715883.
