= Mostowfi ol-Mamalek (title) =

Historic courtly Persian title

Mostowfi ol-Mamalek (Persian: مستوفی‌الممالک) was one of the positions and titles of the Iranian court from the Ilkhanate to the Qajar era.

Mostowfi ol-Mamalek was the leader of all Mostowfis. During the Safavid era, Mostowfi ol-Mamalek was in charge of the finances of the whole country and all the financial and tax affairs of the country and the dismissal and installation of the Mostowfis were done by him. Mostowfi ol-Mamalek was a powerful official during this period, and at the end of Soltan Hoseyn's reign they had the right to participate in the Supreme State Council.

After his coronation, Nader Shah divided the position of Mostowfi ol-Mamalek among four people and appointed each of them to be in charge of the finances of a part of the country. During Karim Khan Zand's rule, this position was again given to one person. At the beginning of the Qajar era, with the expansion of the Qajar bureaucracy, Mostowfi ol-Mamalek became the second prime minister after the Shah. One of the most influential political-noble families of Iran in the Qajar era named Mostowfian Ashtiani family took their name from this title.

== List of Mostowfi ol-Mamaleks of Iran ==
=== Safavid era ===
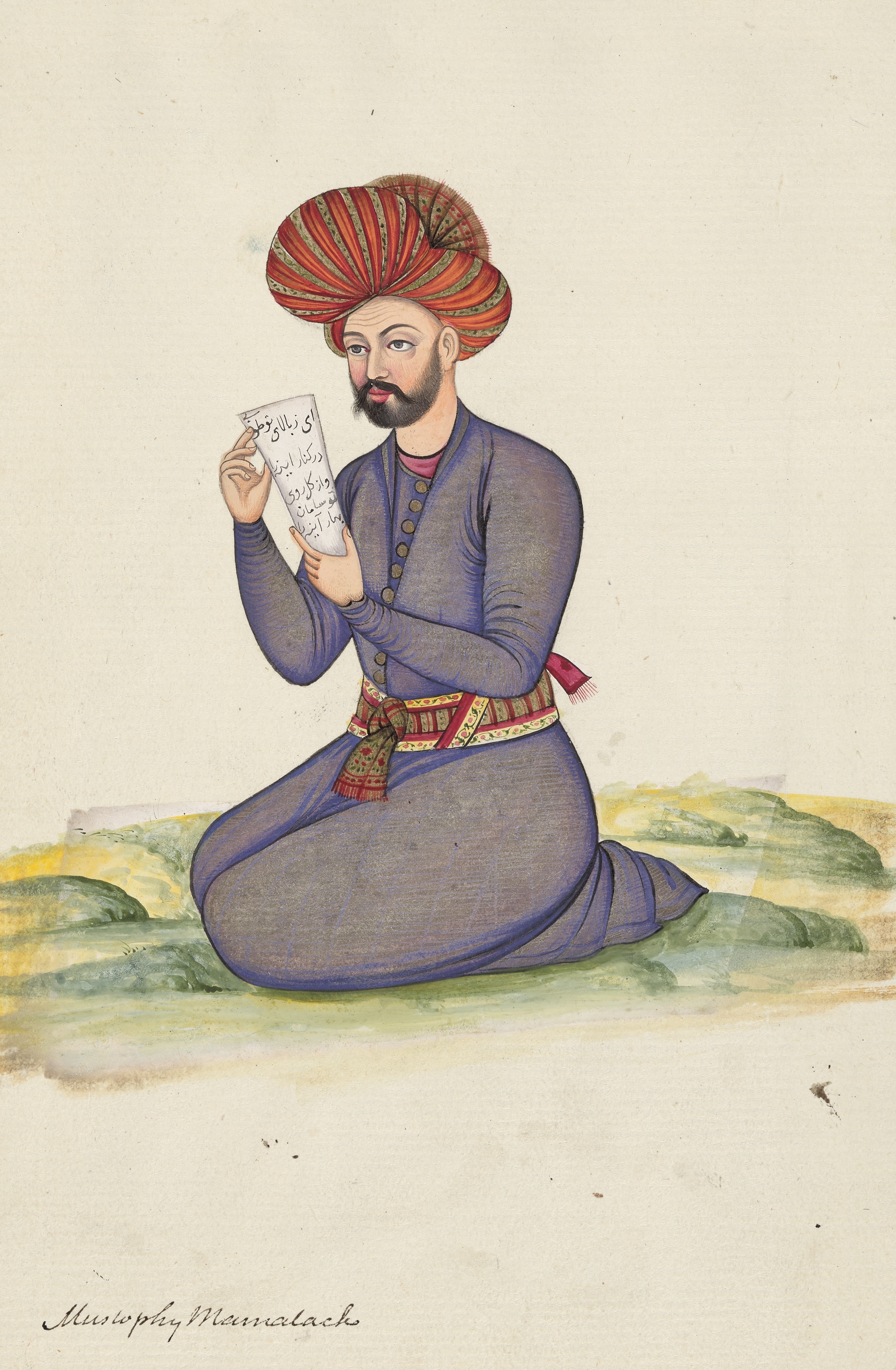
"Mustophy Mamalack," a Portrait of an Official Sitting Holding a Document - Free Library of Philadelphia

- Moulana Shams al-Din Esfahani, 1501–1502
- Najm-e Sani, till 1509
- Ahmad Soltan, 1513–1514
- Mir Sayyed Sharif Shahrestani, 1514–1523
- Mir Masud Golpaigani, 1524–1532
- Khvajeh Shah Hosein Saruqi, 1531–1532
- Khvajeh Ghayath al-Din Ali, till 1551
- Khvajeh Qasem Natanzi, 1551
- Khvajeh Malek Mohammad Esfahani, 1560s
- Mir Ghayath al-Din Mahmud Shahrestani Esfahani, 1573
- Mirza Shokrollah Esfahani, 1573–1576
- Mirza Shah Ghari, 1576–1577
- Mirza Hedayatollah, 1577–1583
- Mirza Mohammad, 1583
- Khvajeh Mohammad Baqer Mervi, ?
- Hatem Beg Ordubadi, till 1591
- Qavama Mohammada, 1591
- Mirza Qasem, ?
- Mirza Abu'l-Hosein Beg Ordubadi, 1629–1632
- Mirza Mohammad Said, 1632–1662
- Mirza Sadr al-Din Mohammad Jaberi, 1662–1666
- Mirza Sadeq, 1673
- Mirza Ebrahim, ?
- Mirza Abu'l-Hasan, 1693–1695
- Ali Reza Khan, 1712–1714
- Mirza Mohammad Khan, 1714
- Mirza Mohammad Hosein, 1715–1716
- Mirza Abu Taleb, 1720–1722
- Mirza Mohammad Rahim, 1722
- Mirza Mohammad Hosein, 1724
- Mirza Esmail, 1730

=== Four Mostowfis in the Afsharid era ===
- Mirza Mohamad Ali Mostowfi, Mostowfi of Fars
- Mirza Ali Asghar Mostowfi, Mostowfi of Khorasan
- Mirza Shafi Tabrizi, Mostowfi of Azarbaijan
- Mirza Bagher Khorasani, Mostowfi of Iraq

=== Zand era ===
- Mirza Mohamad Brojerdi, 1762–1781
- Mirza Mohamad Sadeq Mostowfi ol-Mamalek, 1781–1794

=== Qajar era ===
- Mirza Mohammad Zaki Ali Abadi, Mostowfi ol-Mamalek of Agha Mohammad Khan Qajar
- Mirza Yousof Ashrafi, Mostowfi ol-Mamalek in the early reign of Fath Ali Shah Qajar
- Hajji Mohammad Hossein Isfahani, 1806–1813
- Abdullah Khan Amin al-Dawla, 1813–1823
- Mirza Mohammad Ali Ashtiani, 1823–1826
- Mirza Abul'Qasem Mostowfi ol-Mamalek, 1826-1830s
- Mirza Hassan Mostowfi ol-Mamalek Ashtiani, 1830s–1845
- Mirza Yusuf Ashtiani, 1845–1884
- Mirza Hasan Ashtiani Mostowfi ol-Mamalek, 1884–1925 (Title abolished by Reza Shah)

== Sources ==
- Floor, Willem (2001). Safavid Government Institutions. Mazda Publishers. ISBN 978-1568591353.
