= Savaji family =

Prominent Iranian family

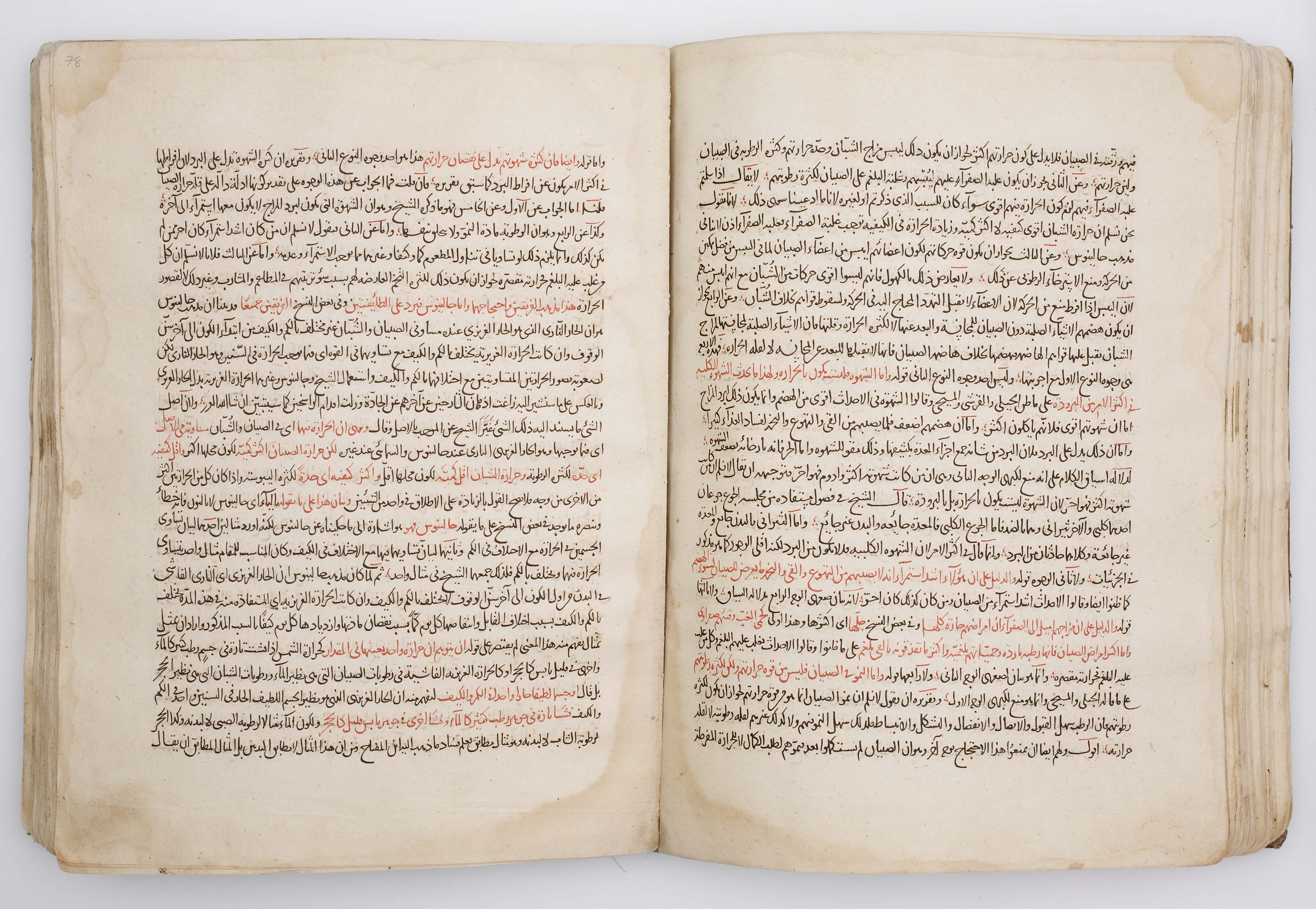
An early 14th-century manuscript of Qutb al-Din al-Shirazi's Sharh Qanun ibn Sina, dedicated to Sa'd al-Din Savaji

The Savaji family, also spelled Savji (Persian: ساوجی), was an Iranian family native to Persian Iraq, who served the Turkmen Aq Qoyunlu and then later the Safavid dynasty.

== Sources ==
- Dunietz, Alexandra (2015). The Cosmic Perils of Qadi Ḥusayn Maybudī in Fifteenth-Century Iran. Brill. ISBN 978-9004302310.
- Mitchell, Colin P. (2009). The Practice of Politics in Safavid Iran: Power, Religion and Rhetoric. I.B.Tauris. pp. 1–304. ISBN 978-0857715883.
- Newman, Andrew J. (2008). Safavid Iran: Rebirth of a Persian Empire. I.B.Tauris. pp. 1–296. ISBN 978-0857716613.
