= Iskandar Beg Munshi =

Iranian historian (c.1560–c.1632)

- اسکندر بیگ منشی
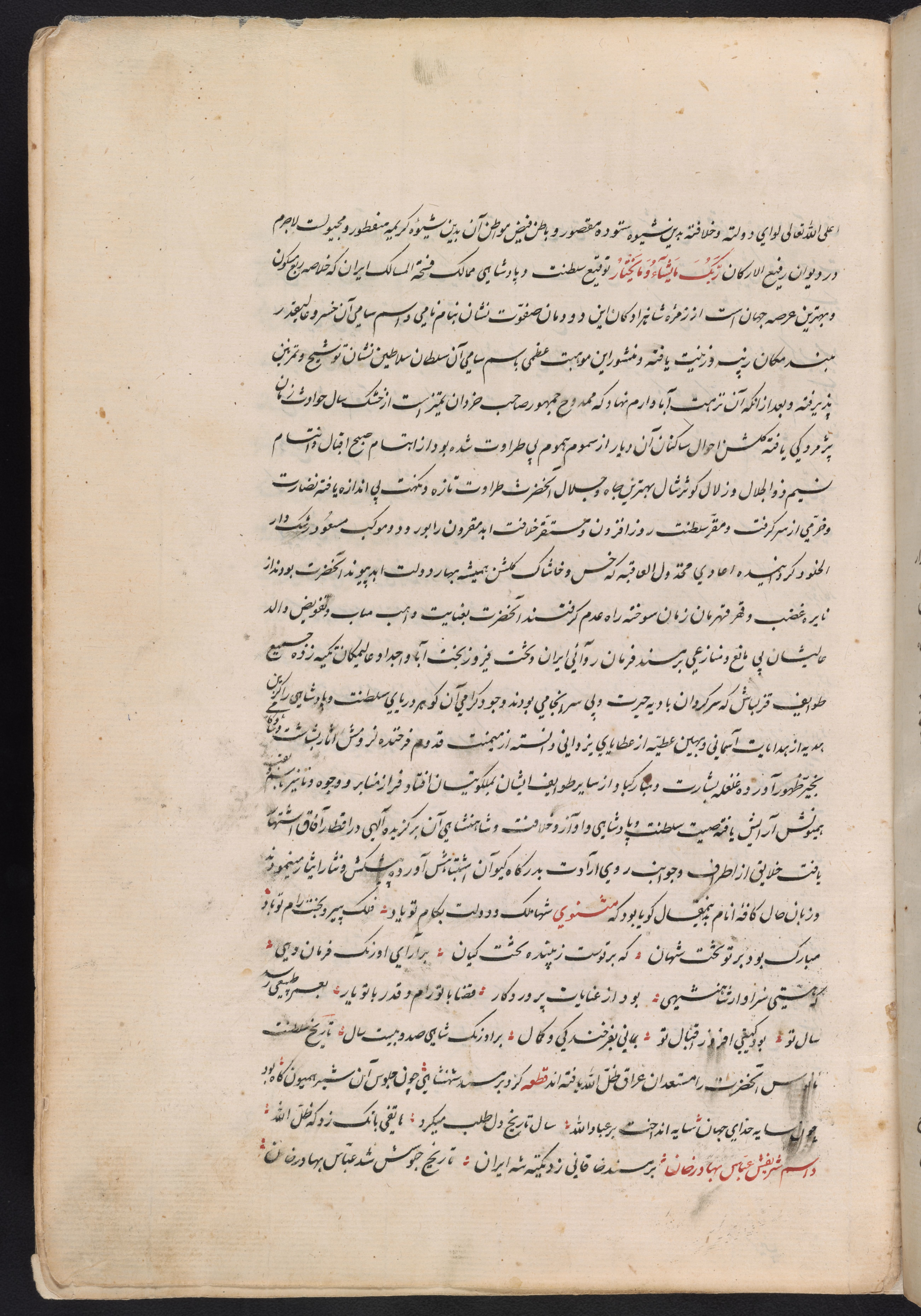
- Manuscript of the Tarikh-e Alam-ara-ye Abbasi by Iskandar Beg Munshi. Created in Qajar Iran, dated July 1812
- Born: 1561/62
- Died: 1633/34 (aged 71–73)
- Occupations: Court scribe, chronicler
- Relatives: Faraj Beg (brother)
- Writing career
- Notable work: Tarikh-e Alam-ara-ye Abbasi

Iskandar Beg Munshi (Persian: اسکندر بیگ منشی; 1561/62 – 1633/34) was an Iranian court scribe and chronicler, who is principally known for his historical book Tarikh-e Alam-ara-ye Abbasi ("The world-adorning history of Abbas"), which focuses on early Safavid history, especially the reign of Shah Abbas I (r. 1588–1629).

== Life ==
Iskandar Beg was born in 1561 or 1562. He belonged to a Turkoman clan which was part of the Qizilbash, a militant Shia group that had helped the Safavids establish their rule. Even though Iskandar Beg came from a Qizilbash family and was affiliated with the military elite of the Safavids, both he and his elder brother Faraj (Farrukh?) Beg joined the bureaucracy instead. Iskandar Beg served as Mirza Ata-Allah Isfahani's pupil scribe during the later rule of Shah Tahmasp I (r. 1524–1576).

Iskandar Beg died in 1633 or 1634.

== Work ==
Iskandar Beg's Tarikh-e Alam-ara-ye Abbasi (abbreviated as TAAA) is considered the most significant piece of Iranian historiography written about Safavid Iran. The book was influenced by the Mughal chronicle Akbarnama of Abu'l-Fazl ibn Mubarak (died 1602).

== Sources ==
- Floor, Willem; Javadi, Hasan (2013). "The Role of Azerbaijani Turkish in Safavid Iran". Iranian Studies. 46 (4): 569–581. doi:10.1080/00210862.2013.784516. S2CID 161700244.
- Ghereghlou, Kioumars (2018). "Iskandar Beg Munshī". In Fleet, Kate; Krämer, Gudrun; Matringe, Denis; Nawas, John; Rowson, Everett (eds.). Encyclopaedia of Islam (3rd ed.). Brill Online. ISSN 1873-9830.
- Moreen, Vera B. (2010). "ʽĀlamārā-yi Ἁbbāsi, Tārīkh-i". In Norman A. Stillman (ed.). Encyclopedia of Jews in the Islamic World. Brill Online.
- Quinn, Sholeh A. (2008). "ʿĀlam ārā- yi ʿAbbāsī". In Fleet, Kate; Krämer, Gudrun; Matringe, Denis; Nawas, John; Rowson, Everett (eds.). Encyclopaedia of Islam (3rd ed.). Brill Online. ISSN 1873-9830.
- Sadan, A. (2022). "The Nature of Legitimacy: Representations of the Natural World in Iskandar Beg Munshi's Tārīkh-e ʿĀlam-ārā-ye ʿAbbāsī". Iranian Studies. 54 (1–2). Cambridge University Press: 41–65. doi:10.1080/00210862.2019.1647095. S2CID 211677412.
- Savory, Roger M. (1985). "ʿĀlamārā-ye ʿAbbāsī". In Yarshater, Ehsan (ed.). Encyclopædia Iranica. Vol. I/8: Alafrank–Alp Arslan. London and New York: Routledge & Kegan Paul. p. 796. ISBN 978-0-71009-097-3.
- Savory, Roger M. (1998). "Eskandar Beg Torkamān Monšī". In Yarshater, Ehsan (ed.). Encyclopædia Iranica. Vol. VIII/6: Eršād al-zerāʿa–Eʿteżād-al-Salṭana. London and New York: Routledge & Kegan Paul. pp. 602–603. ISBN 978-1-56859-055-4.
