= Hossein Beg Laleh Shamlu =

Senior Safavid official under Shah Ismail I

Laleh Hossein Beg Shamlu
- حسین بیگ شاملو
- Hossein Beg Laleh Shamlu (detail), from Alamara-ye Shah Ismail, c. 1688

Vakil of the Safavid Iran
- In office 1501–1507
- Monarch: Ismail I
- Preceded by: office established
- Succeeded by: Mir Najm Zargar Gilani

Amir ol-omara (commanders-in-chief)
- In office 1501–1502
- Monarch: Ismail I
- Preceded by: office established
- Succeeded by: Mir Najm Zargar Gilani

Personal details
- Born: 1452
- Died: 23 August, 1514 (aged 61–62) Chaldiran plain
- Tribe: Shamlu

Hossein Beg Laleh Shamlu (Persian: حسین بیگ شاملو; 1452 – 23 August 1514) was a Qizilbash officer of Turkoman origin, who occupied high offices under Shah Ismail I (r. 1501–1524), the founder of the Safavid dynasty. He was the first person to serve as the vakil (vicegerent) of the Safavid Empire.

== Biography ==
Hossein belonged to the Shamlu tribe, one of the seven Turkoman tribes of the Qizilbash, a Shia militant group, which supported the young Safaviyya leader Ismail I, who had taken refuge in Gilan to avoid the Aq Qoyunlu, a Turkic tribal federation which controlled most of Iran. During Ismail's stay in Gilan, Hossein Beg served as his guardian and mentor. In 1500, Ismail came out of hiding and with the aid of the Qizilbash, invaded Shirvan, killing its ruler Farrukh Yassar. In 1501, all of Shirvan, Arran and Azerbaijan was under the control of Ismail, who laid foundation to the Safavid dynasty.

He then appointed Hossein Beg as the vakil of the empire and the commander-in-chief (amir al-umara) of the Qizilbash army. By 1504, all of present-day Iran was under the control of Ismail. In 1507, Hossein Beg campaigned in western Iran, where he was ambushed by a group of Kurds and as a result lost 300 men. During the same year, Ismail appointed the Iranian Mir Najm Zargar Gilani as the new vakil. One year later, a Safavid army under Hossein Beg and Ismail captured Baghdad. In 1509/10, Hossein Beg lost his office as commander-in-chief in favor to a man of humble origins, Muhammad Beg Ustajlu (later called "Chayan Khan"). In 1512, Hossein Beg, along with the rest of the Qizilbash commanders, betrayed the Safavid vakil Najm-e Sani and left him to die at the Battle of Ghazdewan.

Hossein Beg later took part in Ismail's war against the Ottomans, but was killed at the Battle of Chaldiran in 1514.

== Sources ==
- Savory, Roger (1998). "ESMĀʿĪL I ṢAFAWĪ". Encyclopaedia Iranica, Vol. VIII, Fasc. 6. pp. 628–636.
- Mazzaoui, Michel M. (2002). "NAJM-E ṮĀNI". Encyclopaedia Iranica.
- Newman, Andrew J. (2008). Safavid Iran: Rebirth of a Persian Empire. I.B.Tauris. pp. 1–281. ISBN 9780857716613.
- Savory, Roger (2007). Iran under the Safavids. Cambridge University Press. pp. 1–288. ISBN 978-0521042512.
- Bosworth, C.E.; Savory, R.M. (1989). "AMĪR-AL-OMARĀʾ". Encyclopaedia Iranica, Vol. I, Fasc. 9. pp. 969–971.
- Roemer, H.R. (1986). "The Safavid period". The Cambridge History of Iran, Volume 5: The Timurid and Safavid periods. Cambridge: Cambridge University Press. pp. 189–351. ISBN 9780521200943.

| New office | Vakil of the Safavid Iran; 1501-1507 | Succeeded by Mir Najm Zargar Gilani |
