= Najm-e Sani =

Safavid grand vizier (died 1512)

- نجم ثانی
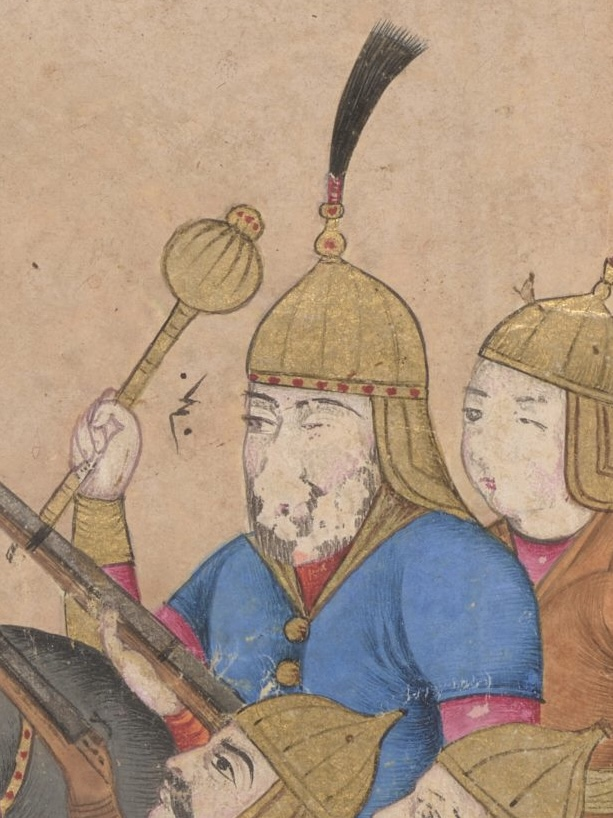
- The capture of Qarshi Castle by Najm-e Sani (detail), from a manuscript of the Tarikh-e jahanara-ye Shah Ismail ("History of the world-adorning Shah Ismail"). Created in Isfahan in 1683

Grand Vizier of the Safavid Empire
- In office 1507–1510
- Monarch: Ismail I (r. 1501–1524)
- Preceded by: Amir Zakariya; Mahmud Jan Daylami
- Succeeded by: Hossein Monshi Qomi

Vakil of the Safavid Iran
- In office 1509/10–1512
- Monarch: Ismail I (r. 1501–1524)
- Preceded by: Mir Najm Zargar Gilani
- Succeeded by: Abd al-Baqi Yazdi

Amir ol-omara (commander-in-chief)
- In office 1509–1510
- Monarch: Ismail I (r. 1501–1524)
- Preceded by: Mir Najm Zargar Gilani
- Succeeded by: Abdol-Baqi Nematollahi

Mostowfi ol-mamalek (comptroller general)
- In office ?–1509
- Monarch: Ismail I (r. 1501–1524)
- Preceded by: Moulana Shams al-Din Esfahani
- Succeeded by: Ahmad Soltan

Personal details
- Born: 15th century Isfahan, Aq Qoyunlu
- Died: 12 November 1512 Ghazdewan (present-day Uzbekistan)
- Children: Mirza Jan Beg Khuzani
- Noble family: Khuzani

Military service
- Allegiance: Safavid Iran
- Rank: Commander-in-chief
- Battles/wars: Persian–Uzbek wars; Battle of Ghazdewan †

Amir Yar-Ahmad Khuzani Isfahani (Persian: امیر یاراحمد خوزانی اصفهانی; died 1512), better known by his honorific title of Najm-e Sani ("The Second Star") was a Persian nobleman from the Khuzani family, who was the third person to serve as the vakil (vicegerent) of Safavid Iran. He also served as the grand vizier from 1507 to 1510.

== Biography ==
Najm was born during the 15th-century in Isfahan, and belonged to a prominent family which could trace its existence in Isfahan back to the 1440s. He had a brother named Mahmud Beg Khuzani. In 1509/10, Najm succeeded Amir Najm al-Din Mas'ud Gilani in the vakil office, and later in 1512, he, along with the Timurid prince Babur attacked the marauding Uzbeks, who despite suffering a heavy defeat in 1510 by Shah Ismail I, kept making incursions into the eastern Safavid province of Khorasan. It is disputed whether Najm led the attack without approval from Ismail I or not. After having crossed the Oxus River, Najm seized Qarshi, and had the city sacked and its inhabitants brutally massacred, which resulted in the death of over 1,500 men, and even children and women. A small Sayyid community was also massacred by the army of Najm, the prominent poet Maulana Binai being one of them.

Najm then attacked Ghazdewan, a town near Bukhara, but was unable to capture the town. Babur then advised Najm to retreat to Qarshi in order to wait for reinforcements. Najm, however, declined, which resulted in the mutiny of several Qizilbash chieftains who had been with him during his campaign. On November, a battle ensured at Ghazdewan between the Uzbeks and what was left of the army of Najm, which resulted in his defeat and capture. He was shortly executed, and was succeeded by Abd al-Baqi Yazdi in the vakil office.

== Sources ==
- Mazzaoui, Michel M. (2002). "NAJM-E ṮĀNI". In Yarshater, Ehsan (ed.). Encyclopædia Iranica (Online ed.). Encyclopædia Iranica Foundation.
- Soucek, P. P. (1982). "ʿABD-AL-BĀQĪ YAZDĪ". In Yarshater, Ehsan (ed.). Encyclopædia Iranica. Vol. I/1: Āb–ʿAbd-al-Hamīd. London and New York: Routledge & Kegan Paul. pp. 105–106. ISBN 978-0-71009-090-4.
- Newman, Andrew J. (2008). Safavid Iran: Rebirth of a Persian Empire. I.B.Tauris. pp. 1–281. ISBN 9780857716613.
- Savory, Roger (2007). Iran under the Safavids. Cambridge University Press. pp. 1–288. ISBN 978-0521042512.

Preceded by Amir Zakariya; Mahmud Jan Daylami	Grand Vizier of the Safavid Empire; 1507-1510	Succeeded by Hossein Monshi Qomi
Preceded by Mir Najm Zargar Gilani	Vakil of Safavid Iran; 1509/10-1512	Succeeded by Abd al-Baqi Yazdi
Preceded by Mir Najm Zargar Gilani	Amir ol-omara (commander-in-chief); 1509-1510	Succeeded by Abdol-Baqi Nematollahi
Preceded by Moulana Shams al-Din Esfahani	Mostowfi ol-mamalek (comptroller general) ?-1509	Succeeded by Ahmad Soltan
