= Div Sultan Rumlu =

Iranian general and politician

- دیو سلطان روملو
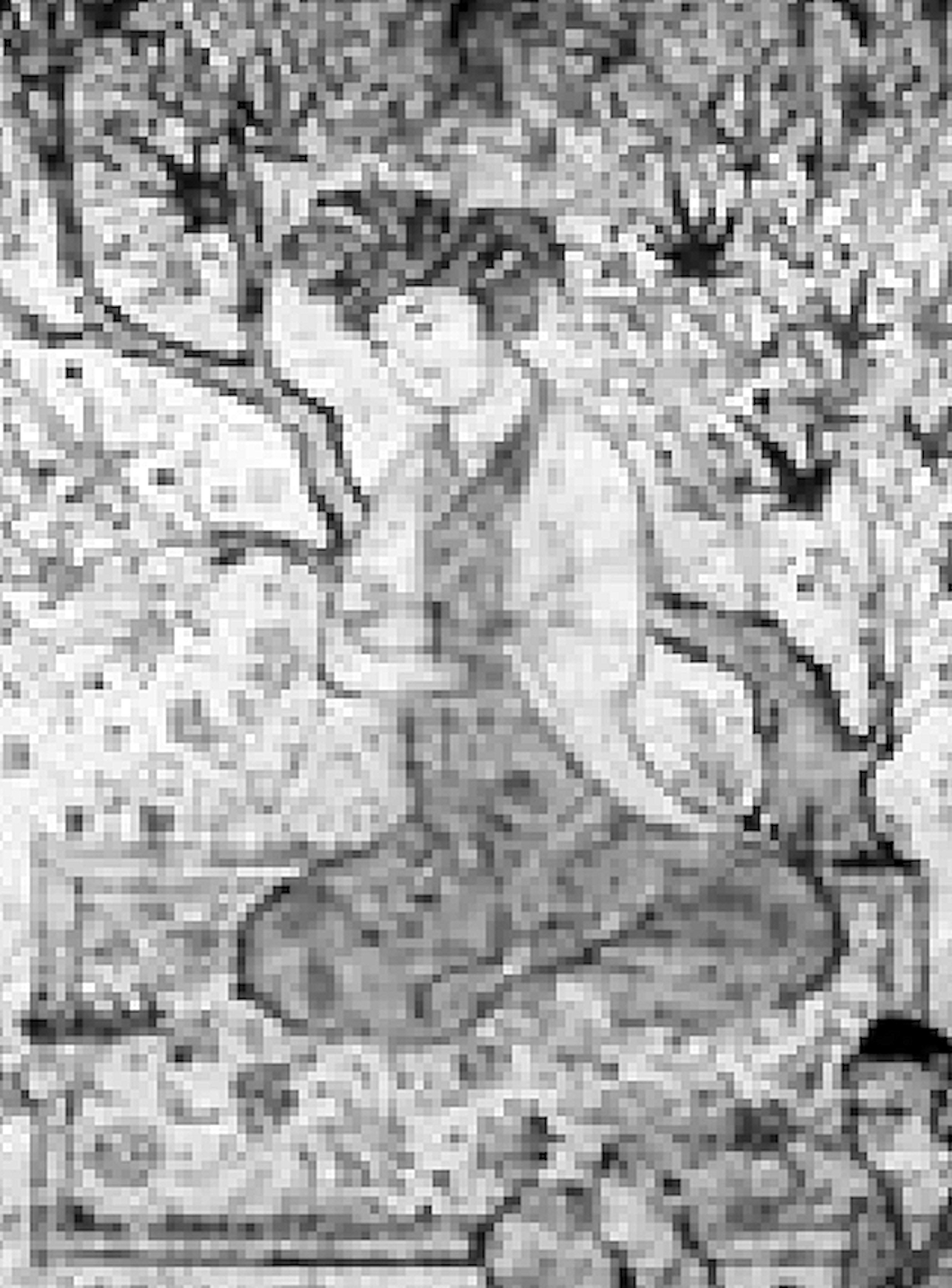
- A 1578 depiction of Div Sultan Rumlu in summer quarters in Lar on 1525.

Vakil of the Safavid Iran
- In office 23 May 1524 – 5 July 1527
- Monarch: Tahmasp I
- Succeeded by: Kopek Sultan

Amir ol-omara (commander-in-chief)
- In office 1523–1526 Co-leading with Mostafa Soltan Ustajlu
- Monarchs: Ismail I (r. 1501–1524); Tahmasp I (r. 1524–1576)
- Preceded by: Bayazid Soltan Ustajlu
- Succeeded by: Choqa Sultan Tekellu

Hakem (Governor) of Erivan
- In office 1516–1527
- Monarchs: Ismail I (r. 1501–1524); Tahmasp I (r. 1524–1576)
- Preceded by: Hamzeh Beg Ustajlu
- Succeeded by: Soleyman Beg Rumlu

Personal details
- Born: Ali
- Died: 5 July 1527 Tabriz, Safavid Iran
- Tribe: Rumlu

Military service
- Allegiance: Safavid Iran
- Rank: Commander-in-chief
- Battles/wars: Campaigns of Ismail I; Battle of Sharur; Persian–Uzbek wars; Battle of Merv

Ali Beg Rumlu (Persian: علی ‌بیگ روملو) commonly known as Div Sultan Rumlu (Persian: دیو سلطان روملو) was a Turkmen military commander and politician from the Rumlu clan, one of the seven chief Qizilbash tribes which provided crack troops for Safavid guard. He served as the governor (hakem) of the Erivan Province (also known as Chokhur-e Sa'd) from 1516 to 1527. Also he was a powerful regent to Shah Tahmasp I from 1524 to 1527, who was then underage. Div Sultan Rumlu had summer quarters at Lar Valley in the Alborz Mountains.

Ali Beg Rumlu, first mentioned at the Battle of Sharur, the fought in 1501 near Nakhchivan, between the forces of Ismail I and the Aq Qoyunlu army of Alvand Beg. Ismail decisively defeated Alvand, after which the qizilbashes advanced unopposed on tabriz, the former aq qoyunli imperial capital.

== Rise to power ==
In 1513, following a punitive expedition in the regions of Shofirkon, Andkhoy, and Balkh, he was appointed governor of Balkh. Two years later, in 1515, Div Sultan visited Shah Ismail's court in Tabriz to report the complete expulsion of the Uzbeks from Khorasan and the ineffectiveness of Zeynal Khan Shamlu, the governor of Herat. Div Sultan did not return to Khorasan.

Div Sultan stayed in tabriz until 1516, when Ismail I ordered to start religious war (jihad) against georgia. Div Sultan captured much of castles and towns, and forced Qvarqvare III Jaqeli, David X and Levan of Kakheti, to acknowledge the safavid authority. With the return to winter camp in nakhichevan, shah ismail granted div sultan with boundless attention and trophies due to success in war.

== Peak of power ==
In 1523, div sultan was appointed Amir ol-Omara (commander-in-chief), superseding Chayhan Soltan, or his son Bayazid Soltan, the latter having died the previous year. After the death of Shah Ismail on 23 may 1524, div sultan, by virtue of a testamentary disposition of the late shah, retained the office of amir ol-omara and was made lala (tutor) of the young prince Tahmasp Mirza. Under the guardianship of Div Sultan, the ten-year-old Tahmasp ascended the throne, and on 23 may 1524, div sultan was became the vakil of the state and eventually became the de facto ruler of the realm. Less than a year later, he put to death the grand vizier, Jalal al-Din Mohammad Tabrizi, who was succeeded by Qadi Jahan Qazvini.

He was initially supported by the Rumlu, Tekelu and Dhulkadar tribes, by most of the Shamlu amirs, and by some Ustajlus. However, Kopek Sultan, governor of Tabriz and leader of ustajlu, along with Choha Sultan, leader of the tekeli tribe, were Div Sultan's strongest opponents. Rumlu proposed a triumvirate to the two leaders which was accepted, the terms were for sharing the office of amir ol-omara.

== Civil war and death ==
In the spring of 1526, a series of battles in northwest Iran between these tribes expanded into khorasan and became a civil war. The ustalli faction was quickly excluded and their leader, Kopek Sultan, was killed by order of Choha Sultan, Choha sultan succeeded in persuading Shah Tahmasb that div sultan was the cause of the conflict. On 5 July 1527, when Div Sultan entered the divan, the Shah gave the signal for his execution by the royal guards.

== Sources ==
Media related to Div Sultan Rumlu at Wikimedia Commons

- Fisher, William Bayne; Jackson, Peter; Lockhart, Laurence (1968). The Cambridge History of Iran. Vol. 6. Cambridge: Cambridge University Press. ISBN 0521200946.
- Rayfield, Donald (2013). Edge of Empires: A History of Georgia. Reaktion Books. ISBN 978-1780230702.
- Hasan, Rūmlū; Seddon, Charles Norman (1934). Chronicle of the Early Safawīs: Being the Ahsanuʼt-Tawārīkh of Hasan-i-Rūmlū. Vol. 1. Oriental Institute.
- Roxburgh, David J. (2001). Prefacing the Image: The Writing of Art History in Sixteenth-century Iran. Leiden: Brill. ISBN 90-04-11376-2.
- Woods, John E. (1999). The Aqquyunlu: Clan, Confederation, Empire (Revised and Expanded). Salt Lake City: University of Utah Press. ISBN 0874805651.
- Nasiri, Ali Naqi; Floor, Willem M. (2008). Titles and Emoluments in Safavid Iran: A Third Manual of Safavid Administration. Mage Publishers. ISBN 978-1933823232.
- Potts, Daniel T. (2014). Nomadism in Iran: From Antiquity to the Modern Era. Oxford: Oxford University Press. ISBN 978-0-19-933079-9.
- Savory, Roger M. (1995). "Dīv Solṭān". In Yarshater, Ehsan (ed.). Encyclopædia Iranica (Online ed.). Encyclopædia Iranica Foundation.
- Mitchell, Colin P. (2011). New Perspectives on Safavid Iran: Empire and Society. London: Routledge. ISBN 978-1-136-99193-6.
- Abrahams, Simin (1999). Historiographical study and annotated translation of volume 2 of the Afzal al-Tavarikh by Fazil Khuzani al-Isfahani. Edinburgh: University of Edinburgh.
- Savory, Roger M. (1998). "Esmāʿīl I ṣafawī". In Yarshater, Ehsan (ed.). Encyclopædia Iranica (Online ed.). Encyclopædia Iranica Foundation.
- Newman, Andrew J. (2008). Safavid Iran: Rebirth of a Persian Empire. London: I.B. Tauris. ISBN 978-0-85771-661-3.
- Mitchell, Colin P. (2009). "Ṭahmāsp I". In Yarshater, Ehsan (ed.). Encyclopædia Iranica (Online ed.). Encyclopædia Iranica Foundation.
