= Abd al-Baqi Yazdi =

Safavid Nobleman, reigned 1512-14

Vakil of the Safavid Iran
- In office 1512–1514
- Preceded by: Najm-e Sani
- Succeeded by: Mirza Shah Hossein

Personal details
- Died: 23 August 1514 Chaldiran Plain

Abd al-Baqi Yazdi (Persian: عبدالباقی یزدی), was a Persian nobleman, who was the third person to serve as the vakil (vicegerent) of the Safavid Empire.

== Biography ==
A native of Yazd, Abd al-Baqi was the son of Na'im-al-Din Nematollah Sani, who was descended from Shah Nematollah, the founder of the Nematollahi order. In the early 16th-century, Abd al-Baqi succeeded his father as the leader of the Nematollah order. Later in 1511, Abd al-Baqi took part in a celebration at the camp of the Safavid ruler Ismail I (r. 1501–1524).

One year later, Abd al-Baqi served under the vakil Najm-e Sani, who was after a few months killed in Khorasan by Uzbeks. Abd al-Baqi was then appointed as the new vakil by Ismail I. Abd al-Baqi participated in the Battle of Chaldiran in 1514, where the Safavids, however, were defeated and Abd al-Baqi himself was killed. Another Iranian, Mirza Shah Hossein, was then appointed as the new vakil after having found Ismail's favorite wife, who was lost after the battle.

Abd al-Baqi had a son named Mir Abd al-Baqi Yazdi (d. 1564), who was appointed as the governor of Yazd when Ismail's son Tahmasp I ascended the Safavid throne in 1524. He also later in 1535/6 married one of Tahmasp's sisters, who bore him an unnamed daughter, who later married Tahmasp's son Ismail II.

== Sources ==
- Mazzaoui, Michel M. (2002). "NAJM-E ṮĀNI". Encyclopaedia Iranica.
- Soucek, P. P. (1982). "ʿABD-AL-BĀQĪ YAZDĪ". Encyclopaedia Iranica, Vol. I, Fasc. 1. pp. 105–106.
- Newman, Andrew J. (2008). Safavid Iran: Rebirth of a Persian Empire. I.B.Tauris. pp. 1–281. ISBN 9780857716613.
- Savory, Roger (2007). Iran under the Safavids. Cambridge University Press. pp. 1–288. ISBN 978-0521042512.
- Roemer, H.R. (1986). "The Safavid period". The Cambridge History of Iran, Volume 6: The Timurid and Safavid periods. Cambridge: Cambridge University Press. pp. 189–351. ISBN 9780521200943.

Preceded by Najm-e Sani	Vakil of the Safavid Empire; 1512-1514	Succeeded by Mirza Shah Hossein
