= Mirza Shah Hossein =

Safavid grand vizier from 1514 to 1523

- میرزا شاه حسین

Grand Vizier of the Safavid Empire
- In office 1514–1523
- Monarch: Ismail I (r. 1501–1524)
- Preceded by: Hossein Monshi Qomi
- Succeeded by: Jalal al-Din Mohammad Tabrizi

Vakil of the Safavid Iran
- In office 1514–1523
- Monarch: Ismail I (r. 1501–1524)
- Preceded by: Abd al-Baqi Yazdi
- Succeeded by: Jalal al-Din Mohammad Tabrizi

Tofangchi-aghasi (Commander of the Musketeer corps)
- In office 1516
- Monarch: Ismail I (r. 1501–1524)
- Preceded by: Office established
- Succeeded by: Kur Hasan

Personal details
- Died: 14 April 1523

Mirza Kamal al-Din Shah Hossein Isfahani (Persian: میرزا کمال الدین شاه حسین اصفهانی), commonly known as Mirza Shah Hossein, was an Iranian nobleman, who served as the vakil (vicegerent) and vizier of the Safavid Empire. He also briefly held the post of commander of the empire's musketeer corps (tofangchi-aghasi).

== Biography ==
A native of Isfahan, Mirza Shah Hossein originally served as an architect, but was in 1503 appointed as the personal vizier of the powerful Qizilbash magnate Durmish Khan Shamlu, who had recently been appointed as the governor of Mirza Shah Hossein's native city. Mirza Shah Hossein was appointed as vakil and vizier in 1514 after the Battle of Chaldiran, which had a damaging impact on the health of Shah Ismail I, who withdrew from state affairs and began heavy drinking. The appointment of Mirza Shah Hossein to the vakil office was because he had after the battle found Ismail's favorite wife who was lost in Azerbaijan. On 8 September 1515, Mirza Shah Hossein complained to the Portuguese diplomat Fernão Gomes de Lemos about the recent Portuguese conquest of Hormuz, arguing that it was Safavid territory and that the Portuguese had not acted as friends, despite their claims to the contrary. Nevertheless, Mirza Shah Hossein and Ismail I still wanted an alliance with the Portuguese.

Mirza Shah Hossein told Lemos that Ismail I would only fight the Mamluks once he had dealt with the Ottomans, and thus requested gunners and cannon founders from them. Mirza Shah Hossein also said that Afonso de Albuquerque had pledged to use Portuguese ships to carry 12,000 Safavid troops to Bahrain and Qatif, which had rebelled against the Safavids. In a later discussion, Lemos said the Portuguese captain of Hormuz needed Albuquerque's approval to provide ships to Ismail I, but he had already left for Portuguese India. Ismail I considered this to be an excuse. In 1516, Ismail I appointed Mirza Shah Hossein as commander of the musketeer corps (tofangchi-aghasi).

Mirza Shah Hossein used the absence of the shah as an opportunity to expand his authority. Furthermore, Mirza Shah Hossein also became a close friend with Ismail and was alongside him during his period of drinking. This made Mirza Shah Hossein gain influence over the shah himself. In 1521, Mirza Shah Hossein chose to confront his former master, Durmish Khan Shamlu, managing to send him far away from the Safavid court—to Herat in Khorasan, where he was forced to serve as its governor.

On 14 April 1523, Mirza Shah Hossein was murdered by furious Qizilbash members. He was succeeded by Jalal al-Din Mohammad Tabrizi.

== Sources ==
- Floor, Willem (2001). Safavid Government Institutions. Costa Mesa, California: Mazda Publishers. pp. 176–188. ISBN 978-1568591353.
- Floor, Willem (2006). A political and economic history of five port cities, 1500-1730. Mage Publishers. ISBN 978-1933823126.
- Newman, Andrew J. (2008). Safavid Iran: Rebirth of a Persian Empire. I.B.Tauris. pp. 1–281. ISBN 9780857716613.
- Savory, Roger (2007). Iran under the Safavids. Cambridge University Press. pp. 1–288. ISBN 978-0521042512.
- Roemer, H.R. (1986). "The Safavid period". The Cambridge History of Iran, Volume 5: The Timurid and Safavid periods. Cambridge: Cambridge University Press. pp. 189–351. ISBN 9780521200943.

Preceded by Abd al-Baqi Yazdi	Vakil of the Safavid Empire; 1514-1523	Succeeded by Jalal al-Din Mohammad Tabrizi
Preceded by Office created	Commander of the musketeer corps (tofangchi-aghasi); 1516	Succeeded by Kur Hasan
