= Mohammad Ali Khan =

Mohammad Ali Khan may refer to:

- Mohammad Ali Khan Zand (c. 1760 – 1779), second shah of the Zand dynasty
- Mohammad-Ali Khan (sepahsalar), Iranian military and government official
- Mohammad Ali Khan (cricketer) (born 1998), Pakistani cricketer
- Mak Lind (born Mohammed Ali Khan, 1988), Lebanese-born Swedish footballer
- Qaleh-ye Mohammad Ali Khan, a village in Iran
- Mohammadabad, Shirvan, Iran, also known as Mohammad Ali Khan
