= Persian–Uzbek wars =

Series of conflicts 1502–1788

Persian–Uzbek Wars
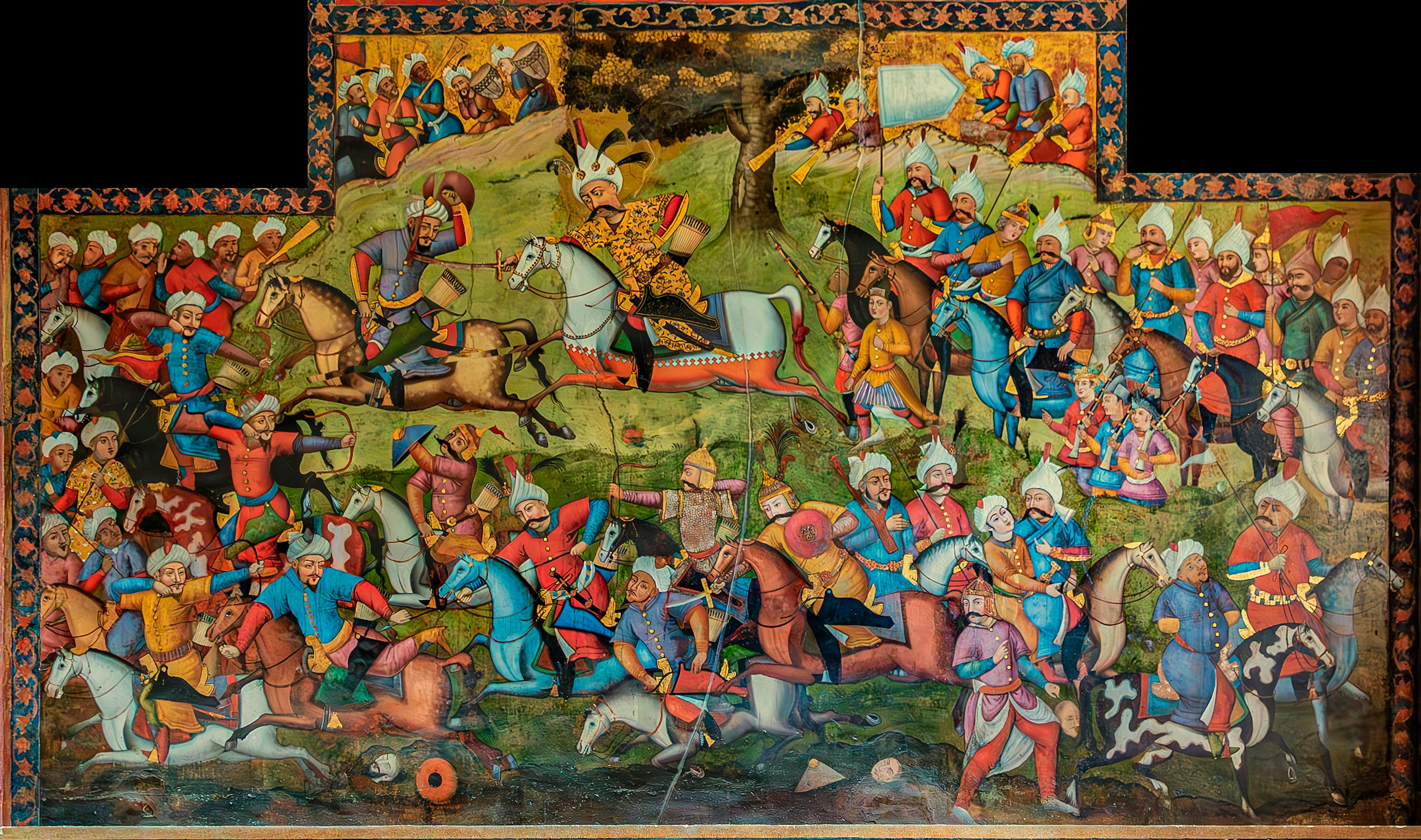
- Battle of Merv (1510), between Ismail I and Shaybani Khan. Chehel Sotoun, Isfahan, painted circa 1647
Date	1502–1788
Location	Khorasan and Central Asia
Result	Inconclusive

Belligerents
Safavid Iran; Timurid of Fergana (until 1512); Afsharid Iran: Qajar dynasty	Khanate of Bukhara; Khanate of Khiva; Emirate of Bukhara

Commanders and leaders
Shah Ismail I Babur; Najm-e Sani (executed); Shah Tahmasp I Shah Mohammad I Abbas the Great; Shah Safi; Nader Shah: Bayram 'Ali Khan (executed)	Shaybani Khan † (Kazakh Khanate) Abu'l-Khayr Sultan †; Ubaidullah Khan; Abdullah Khan II; Baqi Muhammad Khan; Abu al-Fayz Khan; Ilbars Khan (executed); Shah Murad

Casualties and losses
Unknown	Unknown

The Persian–Uzbek Wars or Iranian–Uzbek Wars (Persian: جنگ‌های ایران و ازبکان) were a series of conflicts between the Uzbek dynasties and Iranian dynasties between 1502 and 1788.

== Safavid–Uzbek Wars (1502–1510) ==
In 1502, shortly after Muhammad Shaybani defeated an invasion by the Ferghanan ruler Babur, Safavid emperor Ismail I conquered the rest of Iran. Shaybani and his horsemen began to raid the Timurid Empire, which was a great superpower founded by the ruthless Timur in the late 14th century. Badi al Zaman appealed to the shah of Persia for help, and Ismail went to war with the Shaybanids.

Shaybani captured the Timurid southern capital at Herat in 1507, and then Shaybani went to war with the Kazakh Khanate in the north. Meanwhile, Badi sought asylum in the Persian Empire. Ismail and the Timurid army combined their forces and prepared to face the Uzbeks' army. At the Battle of Marv, the allied army beat off the Shaybanids, and Shaybani was killed trying to flee. This marked the end of the Shaybanid Empire and the wars between the Persian Empire and Shaybani.

== Aftermath ==
The Timurid dynasty was conquered by Babur from 1510 to 1525, and Babur seized power as the ruler. In 1526, Babur invaded India and expanded the Timurids, which in India became known as the Mughal Empire.

== Uzbek Reconquest of Transoxiana ==
The Battle of Ghazdewan occurred near the city of Ghijduvan, in what is now Uzbekistan in November 1512 AD between the Safavid army, supported by the Mughal Empire, and the Uzbek army.

After Babur's defeat at the Battle of Köli Malik near Bukhara, he requested assistance from Biram Khan Karamanlu, the commander serving the Safavid Persian Shah Ismail I at Balkh. With additional support from Biram's detachment, the Uzbeks eventually withdrew from the country of Hissar. After this victory, and in response to his defeat at Köli Malik, Babur personally visited Shah Ismail I to solicit an additional force which he could use to finally defeat the Uzbeks from Mawarannahr (Transoxiana). The Shah accordingly called on Najm-e Sani, his minister of finance, whom he had entrusted with the settlement of Khorasan. Ismail gave him instructions to render assistance to Babur in recovering the dominions he had previously possessed.

On reaching Balkh, Najm resolved to march in person into Mawarannahr, taking with him the governor of Herat, the Amirs of Khorasan, and Biram Khan of Balkh. During his journey, Najm passed the Amu Darya and was soon joined by Babur, creating an army that is said to have been 60,000 men strong.

== Abdullah Khan IIʼs invasions of Khorasan ==
In 1583, Abdullah Khan II’s son, Abd al-Mumin, launched a campaign into Safavid territory and sacked the city of Mashhad. That same year, Abdullah Khan II was proclaimed Khan of all Uzbeks, formally establishing the powerful Bukhara Khanate.

In 1584, Abdullah Khan II annexed Badakhshan, and in 1588, Khorasan.

He brought under his rule all of Transoxiana, Turkestan, Kashgar, the Dasht-i Qipchaq, Khorezm, Balkh, and Badakhshan and also Persia. Then he aimed to liberate Khorasan from the Qizilbash and captured it from Shah Abbas, grandson of Shah Tahmasp, up to Yer-Kupruk, the farthest point of Khorasan.

== Abbas I's Balkh campaign ==
In 1602, Shah Abbas marched on Balkh with 40,000 troops, including 10,000 musketeers and about 300 cannon, a larger field force than those in Western Europe at that period. In the event, a lack of provisions and water caused problems that led Abbas to a humiliating retreat, with most of his cannon lost. Aside from being outmanoeuvred in 1602 by the Uzbek leader, Baqi Muhammad Khan.

== Shah Murad's Merv campaigns ==
In 1785, he launched a campaign against the Qajar principality of Merv, intending to use it as a base for raids against Iran. He killed the governor, Bayram 'Ali Khan Qajar, and fully conquered the region in 1788. 1788 Shah Murad led his second campaign towards Merv, conquering the city and destroying the irrigation system. The principality was brought to an end as Hajji Mohammad Husayn was forced to flee to Iran for his safety.
