= List of Safavid commanders-in-chief =

Commander-in-chief of Safavid Iran
- Appointer: The Shah
- Formation: 1501
- First holder: Hosein Beg Laleh Shamlu
- Final holder: Hosaynqoli Khan
- Abolished: June 1722

This is the list of commanders-in-chief (sepahsalar-e Iran, amir ol-omara) (Note: Also spelled as amir al-omara, emir al-omara, or amir al-umara) of Safavid Iran. The amount of power the holder of the post had, fluctuated quite significantly throughout the centuries.

== List of commanders-in-chief ==
Name	Entered office	Left office	Ethnicity	Family/tribe	Monarch
Hosein Beg Laleh Shamlu	1501	1502	Turkoman	Shamlu tribe	Ismail I
Mir Najm Zargar Gilani	1509	1509	Gilaki		Ismail I
Najm-e Sani	1509	1510	Persian	Khuzani family	Ismail I
Sayyed Mir 'Abdol-Baqi Nematollahi	1513	1514	Unknown		Ismail I
Mohammad Beg Sofreji Ustajlu	1514	1515	Turkoman	Ustajlu tribe	Ismail I
Bayazid Soltan Ustajlu	1523	1524	Turkoman	Ustajlu tribe	Ismail I, Tahmasp I
Div Soltan Rumlu	1523	1524	Turkoman	Rumlu tribe	Ismail I, Tahmasp I
Div Soltan Rumlu + Mostafa Soltan Ustajlu	1524	1524	Turkoman	Rumlu and Ustajlu tribes, respectively	Ismail I, Tahmasp I
Div Soltan Rumlu + Choqa Soltan Tekkelu	1526	1526	Turkoman	Rumlu and Tekkelu tribes, respectively	Tahmasp I
Choqa Soltan Tekkelu	1527	1527	Turkoman	Tekkelu tribe	Tahmasp I
Hosein Beg Shamlu and Abdollah Khan Ustajlu	1531	1534	Turkoman	Shamlu and Ustajlu tribes, respectively	Tahmasp I
Shahqoli Soltan Ustajlu	1567	1568	Turkoman	Ustajlu tribe	Tahmasp I
Qarachaqay Khan	1616	1626	Armenian		Abbas I
Zeinal Khan Shamlu	1629	1630	Turkoman	Shamlu tribe	Abbas I, Safi
Rostam Khan	1631	1643	Georgian	Saakadze family	Safi, Abbas II
Mortezaqoli Khan Qajar	1649	1649	Turkoman	Qajar tribe	Abbas II
Aliqoli Khan	1650	1654	Georgian	Saakadze family	Abbas II
Hamzeh Khan	?	till 1690	Unknown		At least Suleiman I
Aliqoli Khan Zanganeh	1666	1691	Kurdish	Zanganeh tribe	Abbas II, Suleiman I
Rostam Khan	1692	1692	Georgian	Saakadze family	Suleiman I
Shahnavaz II, Gorgin Khan	1703	1703	Georgian	Bagrationi dynasty	Sultan Husayn
Kaykhosrow Khan	1709	1709	Georgian	Bagrationi dynasty	Sultan Husayn
Mohammad Zaman Khan Shamlu	1712	1712	Turkoman	Shamlu tribe	Sultan Husayn
Mansur Khan	?	February 1715	Unknown		Sultan Husayn
Safiqoli Khan	February 1715	?	Unknown		Sultan Husayn
Mohammad-Ali Khan	?	June 1716	Lezgian	Shamkhal of Kumukh	Sultan Husayn
Fath-Ali Khan Turkoman	October 1716	October 1716	Turkoman		Sultan Husayn
Hosaynqoli Khan	End 1716	End 1716	Georgian	Bagrationi dynasty	Sultan Husayn
Lotf-Ali Khan Daghestani	1718	1720	Lezgian	Shamkhal of Kumukh	Sultan Husayn
Esmail Khan	December 1720	December 1720	Unknown		Sultan Husayn
Shamir 'Ali	April 1721	April 1721	Unknown		Sultan Husayn
Mohammad Beg Shamlu	September 1721	September 1721	Turkoman	Shamlu tribe	Sultan Husayn
Hosaynqoli Khan	June 1722	June 1722	Georgian	Bagrationi dynasty	Sultan Husayn

== Sources ==
- Floor, Willem (2001). Safavid Government Institutions. Costa Mesa, California: Mazda Publishers. pp. 17–23. ISBN 978-1568591353.
- Matthee, Rudi (2012). Persia in Crisis: Safavid Decline and the Fall of Isfahan. I.B.Tauris. pp. 1–371. ISBN 978-1845117450.
