= List of Safavid vakils =

Vakil of the Safavid Iran
- Emblem of Iran (1423–1979)

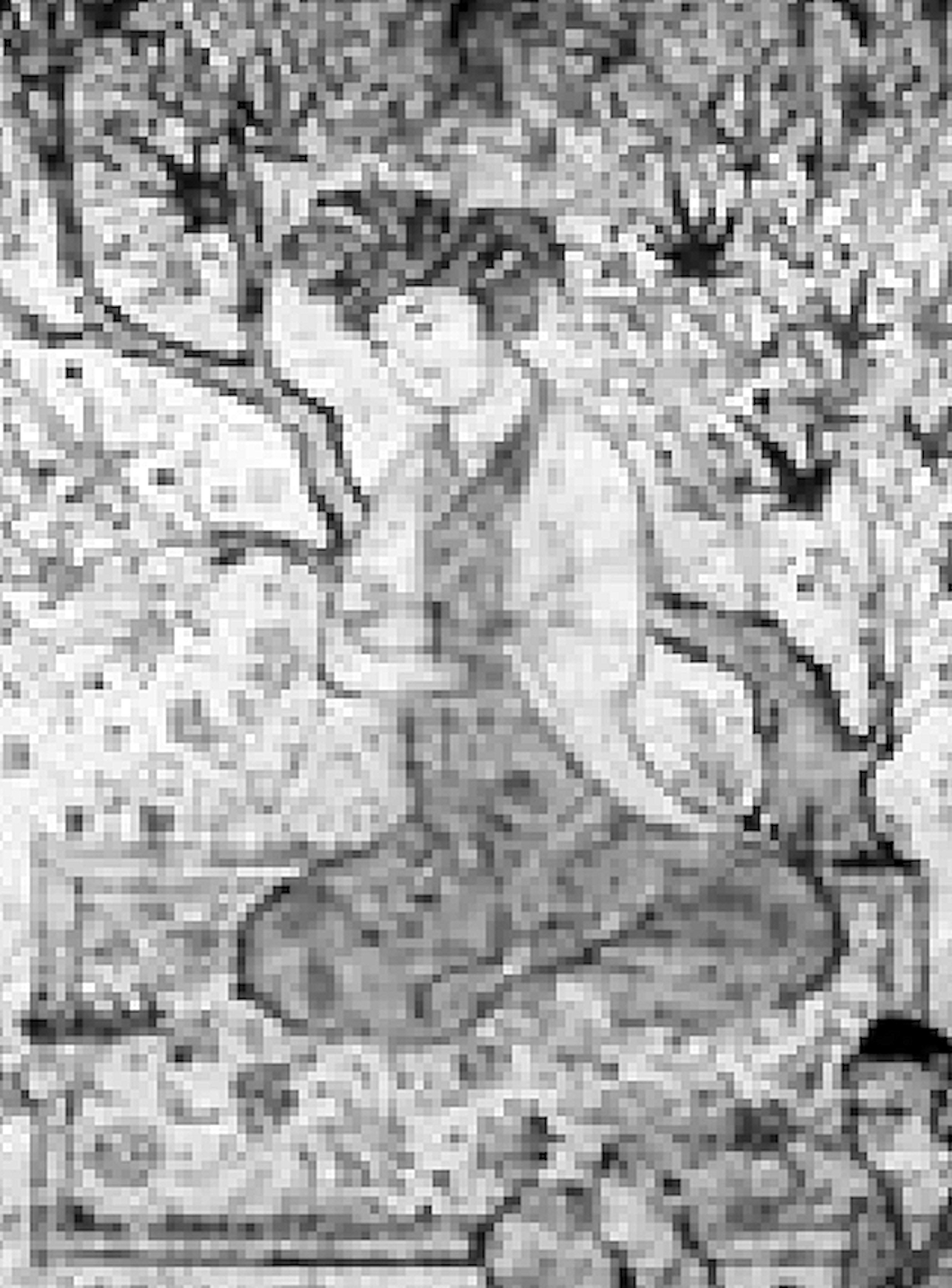
- One of Most Powerful Vakils; Div Sultan Rumlu; 23 May 1524 – 5 July 1527
- Style: His Excellency
- Appointer: The Shah
- Formation: 1501
- First holder: Hossein Beg Laleh Shamlu
- Final holder: Nader-Qoli Khan
- Abolished: 8 March 1736

The Vakil of the Safavid Iran (Persian: وکیلان خاص دوران صفویه) was one of the highest positions in the hierarchy of Safavid Iran, denoting the viceroy and viceregent in the administrative and some religious affairs of the realm.

Ismail I adopted a policy by trying to avoid appointing the Qizilbash to the vakil office, and instead appointed his Iranian kinsmen to high offices, the first one being Mir Najm Zargar Gilani. This was because Ismail had lost some trust to the Qizilbash, who possessed too much power and were no longer very trustworthy.

From 1501 to 1533, the post of commander-in-chief (Sepahsalar-e Iran, Amir ol-Omara), the one of the highest-ranking functions, was combined with the office of Vakil. By same year, Tahmasp I decided to reduce the significance of the commander-in-chief, and implemented that no one could be reappointed to the post of vakil as well.

== List of Vakils ==
Vakil		Term of office			Shah
No.	Name (Birth–Death)	Took office	Left office	Time in office	Shah
1	Hossein Beg Laleh Shamlu (1452–1514)	1501	1507	6 years	Ismail I (1501–1524)
2	Mir Najm Zargar Gilani (d. 1510)	1507	1510	3 years	Ismail I (1501–1524)
3	Najm-e Sani (d. 1512)	1510	1512	2 years	Ismail I (1501–1524)
4	Abd al-Baqi Yazdi (d. 1514)	1512	1514	2 years	Ismail I (1501–1524)
5	Mirza Shah Hossein (d. 1523)	1514	1523	9 years	Ismail I (1501–1524)
6	Jalal al-Din Mohammad Tabrizi (d. 1524)	1523	1524	1 years	Ismail I (1501–1524)
7	Div Sultan Rumlu (d. 1527)	23 May 1524	5 July 1527	3 years, 43 days	Tahmasp I (1524–1576)
8	Chokha Sultan Tekellu (1479–1531)	5 July 1527	18 June 1531	3 years, 348 days	Tahmasp I (1524–1576)
9	Hoseyn Khan Shamlu (d. 1533)	18 June 1531	1533	2 years	Tahmasp I (1524–1576)
—	Unknown or Vacant	1576	1578	1 year	Ismail II (1576–1578)
—	(de facto); Khayr al-Nisa Begum (d. 1579)	1578	1579	1 year	Mohammad Khodabanda (1578–1587)
—	(de facto); Hamza Mirza (1568–1586)	?	?	?	Mohammad Khodabanda (1578–1587)
10	Murshid Qoli Khan Ustajlu (1553–1587)	1587	1588	1 years	Abbas the Great (1587–1629)
11	Zeynal Khan Shamlu (d. 1630)	21 March 1629	17 July 1630	1 year, 118 days	Safi of Persia (1629–1642)
The vakil office remained vacant until 1722.
12	Mir Mahmud (?)	1722	1725	3 years	Tahmasp II (1722–1732)
13	Nader-Qoli Khan (1688 or 1698–1747)	2 September 1732	8 March 1736	3 years, 188 days	Abbas III (1732–1736)
On 8 March 1736, Safavid Iran disestablished by Nader-Qoli Khan and crowned by regnal name of Nader Shah.

== Sources ==
- Newman, Andrew J. (2008). Safavid Iran: Rebirth of a Persian Empire. London: I.B.Tauris. ISBN 978-0857716613.
- Savory, Roger (2007). Iran Under the Safavids. Cambridge: Cambridge University Press. ISBN 0521042518.
- Floor, Willem (2001). Safavid government institutions. Costa Mesa, California: Mazda Publishers. ISBN 1568591357.
- Mazzaoui, Michel M. (2002). "Najm-e Ṯāni". In Yarshater, Ehsan (ed.). Encyclopædia Iranica (Online ed.). Encyclopædia Iranica Foundation.
- Mitchell, Colin Paul (2009). "Ṭahmāsp I". In Yarshater, Ehsan (ed.). Encyclopædia Iranica (Online ed.). Encyclopædia Iranica Foundation.
- Potts, Daniel T. (2014). Nomadism in Iran: from antiquity to the modern era. Oxford: Oxford University Press. ISBN 0199330794.
- Savory, Roger M. (1995). "Dīv Solṭān". In Yarshater, Ehsan (ed.). Encyclopædia Iranica (Online ed.). Encyclopædia Iranica Foundation.
- Savory, Roger (1982). "ʿAbbās III". In Yarshater, Ehsan (ed.). Encyclopædia Iranica (Online ed.). Encyclopædia Iranica Foundation.
- Daniel, Elton L. (2001). The history of Iran. Westport, Connecticut: Greenwood Press.
