= Abdollah Khan Ustajlu =

Iranian dignitary (died 1566/67)

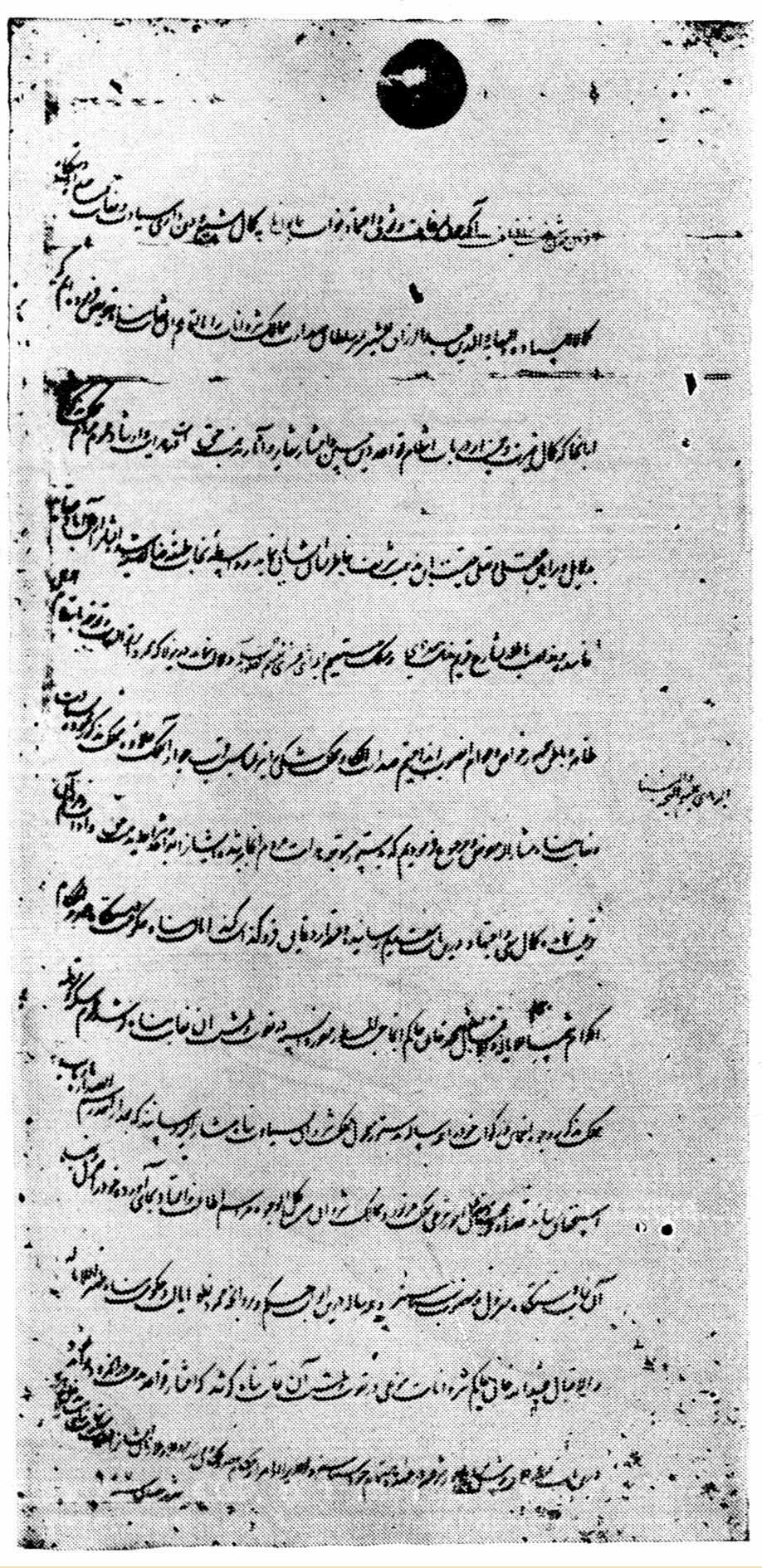
- Farman in Persian by Shah Tahmasp I appointing the theologian 'Abd al-Razzaq Mir Sultan as sadr of the province Shirvan, in which the region of Shaki is to be integrated. Tahmasp also orders the governor Abdollah Khan to promote and strengthen Twelver Shia Islam in this area. Dated 1550

Amir ol-omara (Commander-in-chief)
- In office 1531–1534 (Note: List of Safavid commanders-in-chief#List of commanders-in-chief) Serving with Hosein Beg Shamlu
- Monarch: Tahmasp I
- Preceded by: Choqa Soltan Tekkelu
- Succeeded by: Shahqoli Soltan Ustajlu

Divan-begi (Chief justice)

Other position
- 1549–1565/66: Sadr of Shirvan

Personal details
- Died: 1566/67
- Parent: Qara Khan Ustajlu (father)
- Relatives: Salman Khan Ustajlu (grandson)
- Tribe: Ustajlu

Military service
- Allegiance: Safavid Iran
- Rank: Commander-in-chief

Abdollah Khan Ustajlu (died 1566/67) was a high-ranking Iranian dignitary of Ustajlu Turkoman origin, who served during the reign of Shah Tahmasp I (1524–1576). He successively held the posts of amir al-omarāʾ (commander-in-chief) and divanbegi (chancellor, chief justice), before becoming the governor of Shirvan from 1549 until 1565 or 1566. (Note: According to Floor (2008), his tenure as governor of Shirvan ended in 1565. According to Nashat & Beck (2003), his tenure ended either in 1566 or "perhaps even" in 1577, with the latter being "the year of his death". According to Newman (2008), he died in "1566-7". Floor (2008) also specifically adds on the page about Shirvan that he was governor of Shaki "as of 1549-50", but he does not list him as governor on the page about Shaki/Sheki itself.)

== Biography ==
Abdollah Khan was a son of Qara Khan Ustajlu by his wife, a sister of Shah Ismail I (r. 1501–1524), and was thus a nephew of Shah Ismail. He married a Safavid princess himself, a daughter of Ismail I with the name of Pari Khan Khanum. (Note: In order to avoid confusion with Tahmasp I's daughter Pari Khan Khanum, Ismail I's daughter is sometimes referred to as Pari Khan Khanum I while Tahmasp I's daughter is sometimes referred to as Pari Khan Khanum II.)

In 1549, having already served as amir-al-omarāʾ and divanbegi, he was appointed governor of Shirvan, a post he held for numerous years. In 1562/63, Abdollah Khan sent envoys to the capital of the Russian Tsardom, Moscow, to conduct discussions about trade. In the 1560s, Abdollah Khan granted the Muscovy Company trading privileges, whose mission to Safavid Iran at the time was led by Anthony Jenkinson. Abdollah Khan's grandson, Salman Khan Ustajlu b. Shah-Qoli Mirza (died 1623/24), became one of the "highest and richest dignitaries of the state" on his turn.

== Sources ==
- Floor, Willem M. (2008). Titles and Emoluments in Safavid Iran: A Third Manual of Safavid Administration, by Mirza Naqi Nasiri. Washington, DC: Mage Publishers. p. 285. ISBN 978-1933823232.
- Newman, Andrew J. (2008). Safavid Iran: Rebirth of a Persian Empire. I.B.Tauris. ISBN 978-0857716613.
- Matthee, Rudolph P. (1999). The Politics of Trade in Safavid Iran: Silk for Silver, 1600-1730. Cambridge: Cambridge University Press. ISBN 978-0521641319.
- Nashat, Guity; Beck, Lois, eds. (2003). Women in Iran from the Rise of Islam to 1800. University of Illinois Press. ISBN 978-0252071218.

Preceded by Gokcheh Sultan Qajar	Governor of Shirvan; 1549-1565/1566	Succeeded by Mustafa Beg (Tekkelu?)
