= Gʻijduvon District =

Coordinates: 40°06′N 64°40′E

- District
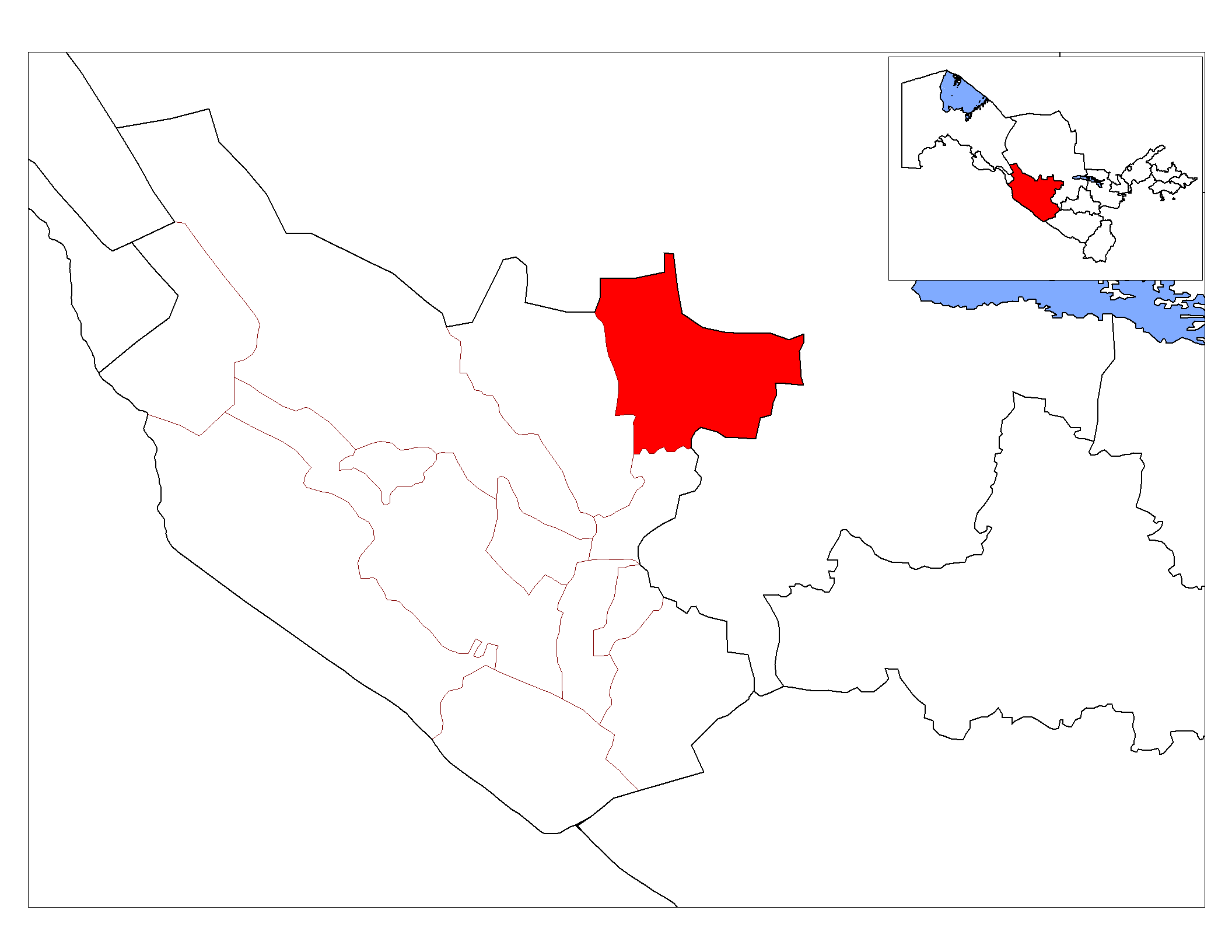
- Country: Uzbekistan
- Region: Bukhara Region
- Capital: Gʻijduvon

Area
  - Total: 3,840 km^{2} (1,480 sq mi)

Population (2021)
  - Total: 311,800
  - Density: 81.2/km^{2} (210/sq mi)
- Time zone: UTC+5 (UZT)

Gʻijduvon District (Uzbek: Gʻijduvon tumani) is a district of Bukhara Region in Uzbekistan. The capital lies at the city Gʻijduvon. It has an area of 3,840 km^{2} (1,480 sq mi) and its population is 311,800 (2021). Until 2018, when it became part of Konimex District (Navoiy Region), the town Zafarobod was part of the Gʻijduvon District.

The district consists of 1 city (Gʻijduvon), 13 urban-type settlements (Abadi, Beshtuvo, Gajdumak, Jovgari, Koʻlijabbor, Mazragan, Yuqori Rostgoʻy, Oʻzanon, Xatcha, Chagʻdari, Dodarak, Namatgaron, Yuqori Qumoq) and 14 rural communities.

== Notable people ==
- Sadriddin Ayni
