= Kenimekh district =

Coordinates: 40°16′47″N 65°08′48″E

Kenimekh district Кенимех, Kenimex
- District
- Kenimekh district
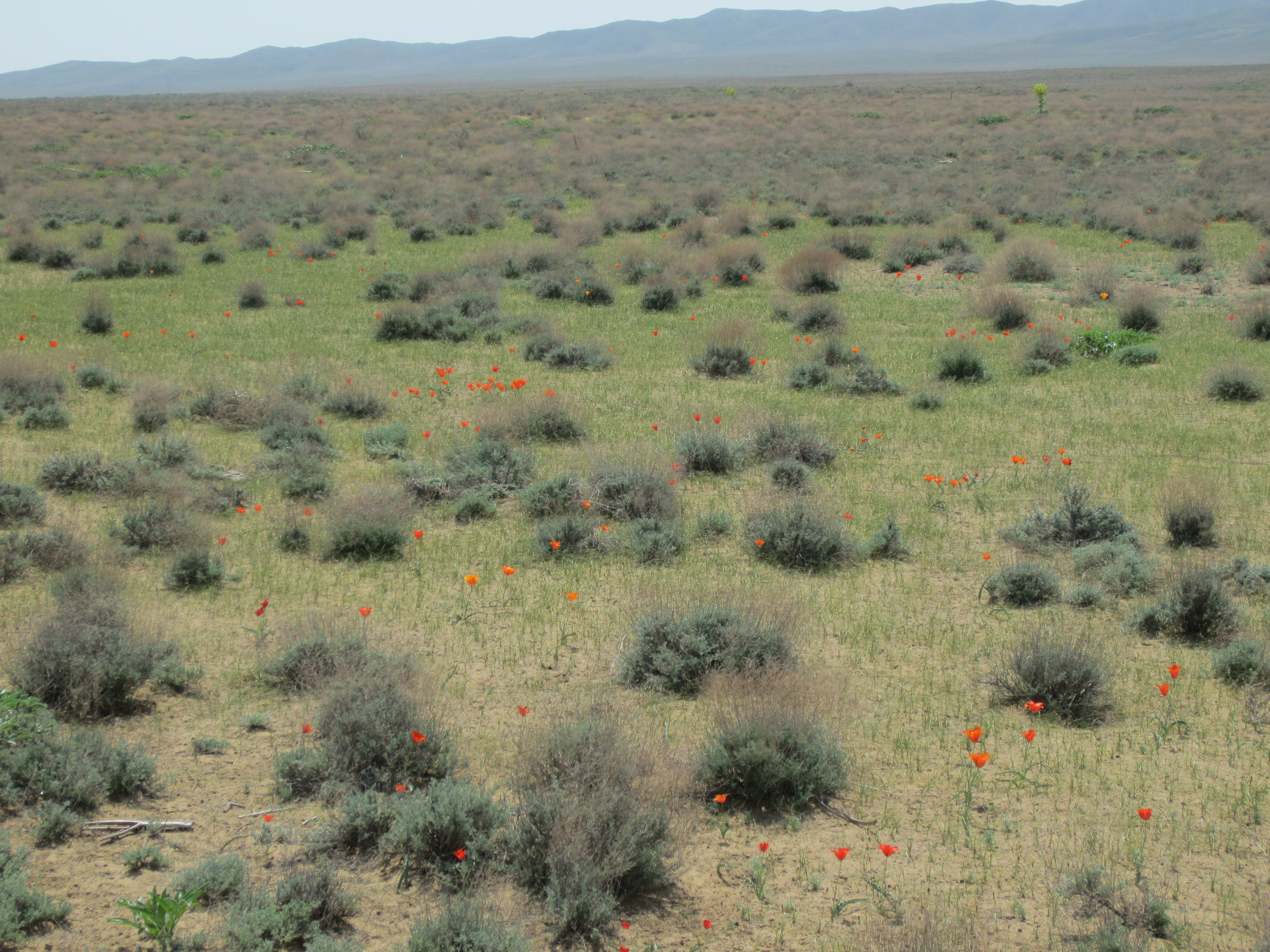

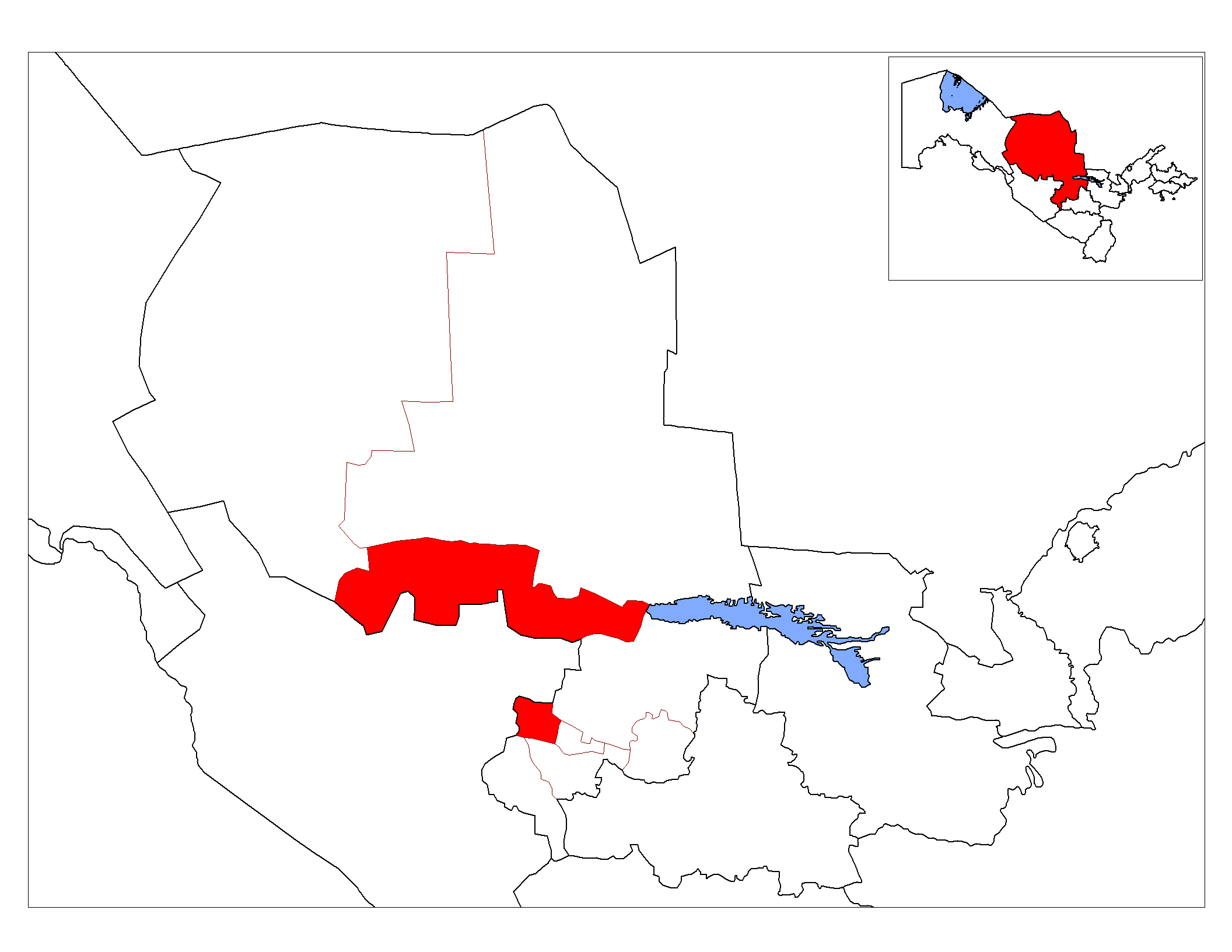
- Country: Uzbekistan
- Region: Navoiy Region
- Capital: Kenimekh

Area
  - Total: 9,250 km^{2} (3,570 sq mi)

Population (2021)
  - Total: 36,200
  - Density: 3.91/km^{2} (10.1/sq mi)
- Time zone: UTC+5 (UZT)

Kenimekh district is a district of Navoiy Region in Uzbekistan. The capital lies at the town Kenimekh. It has an area of 9,250 km^{2} (3,570 sq mi) and its population is 36,200 (2021 est.). The district consists of 5 urban-type settlements (Kenimekh, Balaqaraq, Mamiqchi, Shoʻrtepa, Zafarobod) and 7 rural communities. Until 2018, when it became part of Kenimekh district, the town Zafarobod was part of the Gʻijduvon District (Bukhara Region).
