= Zafarobod, Navoiy =

Zafarobod
- urban-type settlement
- Location in Uzbekistan
- Coordinates: 40°31′55″N 65°01′13″E
- Country: Uzbekistan
- Region: Navoiy Region
- District: Konimex District
- Urban-type settlement status: 1984

Population (2002)
  - Total: 5,800
- Time zone: UTC+5 (UZT)

Zafarobod (Uzbek: Zafarobod/Зафаробод, Russian: Зафарабад) is an urban-type settlement in Bukhara Region, Uzbekistan. It is part of Konimex District. The town population in 2002 was 5,800 people. Until 2018 it was part of the Bukhara Region (Gʻijduvon District).
