= Kenimekh =

Kenimekh Кенимех, Kenimex
- urban-type settlement
- Kenimekh
- Location in Uzbekistan
- Coordinates: 40°17′N 65°09′E
- Country: Uzbekistan
- Region: Navoiy Region
- District: Kenimekh district
- Urban-type settlement status: 1935

Population (2002)
  - Total: 8 400
- Time zone: UTC+5 (UZT)

Kenimekh is an urban-type settlement and seat of Kenimekh district in Navoiy Region in Uzbekistan. The town population in 1989 was 7,750 people.
