= Battle of Merv =

Battle between the Safavid Iran and the Shaybanid Uzbek Khanate

- Part of the Persian–Uzbek wars
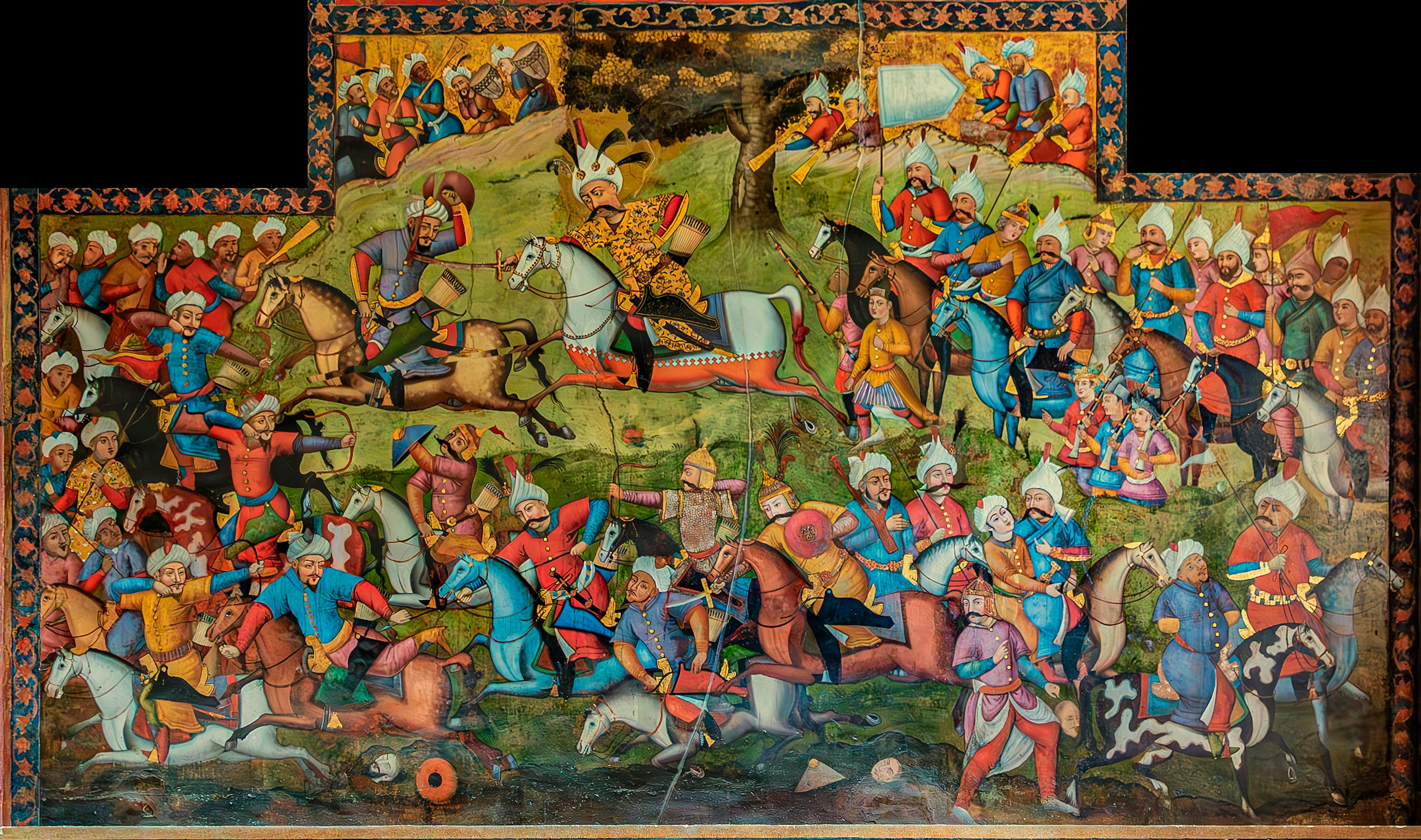
- A fresco "Battle of Merv between Shah Ismail I (center) and the Uzbek khan Muhammad Shaybani in 1510" in Chehel Sotoun palace in Isfahan, painted circa 1647.
Date	2 December 1510
Location	Merv, Khorasan (now Turkmenistan)
Result	Safavid victory
Territorial changes	Safavids annexed Khorasan

Belligerents
Safavid Iran	Khanate of Bukhara

Commanders and leaders
Shah Ismail I	Muhammad Shaybani †

Strength
17,000	Unknown

Casualties and losses
Unknown	10,000 killed

The Battle of Merv (Persian: نبرد مرو) occurred on 2 December 1510 as a result of Shah Ismail I's Safavid invasion of the Khorasan region of Uzbek. It ended with Safavid annexation of the Khorasan region.

== Battle ==
Shah Ismail reached Khorasan with great speed; Shaybani Khan retreated to Merv castle to await reinforcement from Uzbek tribes. The Safavid army then pretended to retreat, encouraging the Uzbeks to leave the castle in pursuit, only to be ambushed and destroyed by the Qizilbash ("Red Heads") troops of Shah Ismail once they were too far from the castle to regain its safety. The Safavid forces were reportedly heavily outnumbered by the army of Shaybani Khan, who was caught and killed trying to escape the battle. Shah Ismail had his body parts sent to various areas of the empire for display, while famously having his skull coated in gold and made into a jeweled drinking goblet.

== See also ==
- Shi'a-Sunni relations
- Battle of Ghazdewan

== Sources ==
- Savory, Roger (1998). "Esmāʿīl I Ṣafawī". Encyclopaedia Iranica, Vol. VIII, Fasc. 6. pp. 628–636.
- Savory, Roger (2007). Iran under the Safavids. Cambridge University Press. pp. 1–288. ISBN 978-0521042512.
