= Mir Najm Zargar Gilani =

Vakil of the Safavid Iran
- In office 1507–1509/10
- Monarch: Ismail I
- Preceded by: Hossein Beg Laleh Shamlu
- Succeeded by: Najm-e Sani

Personal details
- Died: 1509/10

Mir Najm Zargar Gilani (Persian: میر نجم زرگر گیلانی), also known as Shaykh Najm al-Din Zargar Rashti, was an Iranian aristocrat of Gilaki origin, who was the second person to serve as the vakil (vicegerent) of the Safavid Empire.

A native of Gilan in northern Iran, Najm Zargar was originally a goldsmith in Rasht, but due to his Iranian descent was in 1507 appointed as vakil by the Safavid king Ismail I. However, Najm Zargar's tenure as vakil did not last long, since he later died in 1509/10, and was succeeded by Najm-e Sani.

== Sources ==
- Arjomand, Saïd Amir (2016). Sociology of Shiʿite Islam: Collected Essays. Brill. pp. 318–319.
- Mazzaoui, Michel M. (2002). "NAJM-E ṮĀNI". Encyclopaedia Iranica.
- Newman, Andrew J. (2008). Safavid Iran: Rebirth of a Persian Empire. I.B.Tauris. pp. 1–281. ISBN 9780857716613.
- Savory, Roger (2007). Iran under the Safavids. Cambridge University Press. pp. 1–288. ISBN 978-0521042512.

Preceded by Hossein Beg Laleh Shamlu	Vakil of the Safavid Empire; 1507-1509/10	Succeeded by Najm-e Sani
