= Battle of Ghazdewan =

Part of Persian–Uzbek wars

- Part of Persian–Uzbek wars Timurid–Uzbek Wars
Date	12 November 1512
Location	Ghazdewan, Uzbekistan
Result	Uzbek victory
Territorial changes	Uzbeks reconquer Transoxiana

Belligerents
Safavid Empire; Timurid Empire	Khanate of Bukhara

Commanders and leaders
Najm-e Sani (POW) (executed); Babur (AWOL); Husayn Beg Shamlu; Abdal Beg Talish; Biram Khan Qaramanlu	Ubaydullah Sultan, Abul Ghazi; Sheikhein Mirza †; Timur Sultan; Jani Beg Sultan; Kuchum Khan; Suyunjuk Sultan

Strength
60,000	<15,000

Casualties and losses
High	High

The Battle of Ghazdewan occurred near the city of Ghijduvan, what is now Uzbekistan in November 1512 AD between Safavid army, supported by the Mughal Empire, and the Uzbek army.

== Battle ==
After Babur's defeat at the Battle of Köli Malik near Bukhara, he requested assistance from Biram Khan Karamanlu, the commander serving the Safavid Persian Shah Ismail I at Balkh. With additional support from Biram's detachment, the Uzbeks eventually withdrew from the country of Hissar. After this victory, and in response to his defeat at Köli Malik, Babur personally visited Shah Ismail I to solicit an additional force which he could use to finally defeat the Uzbeks from Mawarannahr (Transoxiana). The Shah accordingly called on Najm-e Sani, his minister of finance, whom he had entrusted with the settlement of Khorasan. Ismail gave him instructions to render assistance to Babur in recovering the dominions he had previously possessed.

On reaching Balkh, Najm resolved to march in person into Mawarannahr, taking with him the governor of Herat, the Amirs of Khurasan, and Biram Khan of Balkh. During his journey, Najm passed the Amu Darya and was soon joined by Babur, creating an army that is said to have been 60,000 men strong.

== Uzbek Raids into Khorasan (1513) ==
Early in the autumn the army advanced to Khozar, ultimately seizing the city. They then proceeded to Qarshi, which had been strongly fortified and garrisoned by Sultan Ubaydullah Sultan, the chief of Bukhara.

It was proposed to leave Karshi behind as had been done with success in preceding campaigns, but Najm, believing it was Sultan Ubaydullah Sultan's lair, declared that it must be taken. The city was therefore besieged and carried by storm with all inhabitants, Uzbek or not, being put to the sword regardless of age, sex, or sanctity. The circumstances of this massacre disgusted Babur, who found himself playing a subordinate role in an army that was professedly acting under his authority. In his desire to save the inhabitants, who were Chaghatai Turks of his own race and sect, he earnestly besought Najm to comply with his wishes. But the unrelenting Persian, deaf to his entreaties, let loose all the fury of war on the devoted city. Among the casualties was the poet Maulana Binai, one of the most eminent minds of his time who happened to be in the town when it fell in the indiscriminate slaughter, along with many Sayyids and holy men. From that time forward, Najm failed to prosper in any more of his undertakings.

The Uzbek chiefs, after the massacre at Karshi, appeared for some time to have retired and fortified themselves in their strongholds. Najm eventually moved on to attack Ghazdewan, on the border of the desert, without having taken Bukhara. The Uzbek sultans now had time to assemble under the command of Ubaydullah Sultan. Joined by Timur Sultan from Samarkand, they threw themselves into the fort the very night that Babur and Najm had taken their ground before it, preparing their engines and ladders for an assault.

In the morning, the Uzbeks drew out their army and took up a position among the houses and gardens in the suburbs of the town with the confederates advancing to meet them. The Uzbeks, who were protected by the broken ground and by the walls of the enclosures and houses, had posted archers in every corner to pour a shower of arrows on the Qizilbashes as they approached. Once Biram Khan, the chief military commander of the Qizilbash troops, had fallen off his horse and had been wounded, the main body of the army fell into disorder. In the course of an hour the invaders were routed with most of them falling in the field. Babur routed and discomfited fled back to Hissar. It is said that the Qizilbash chiefs, disgusted with the haughtiness and insolence of Najm, did not use their utmost efforts to assist him and he was eventually taken prisoner and put to death. Many of the Persian chiefs who fled from the battle crossed the Amu Darya at Kirki and entered Greater Khorasan.

== Aftermath ==
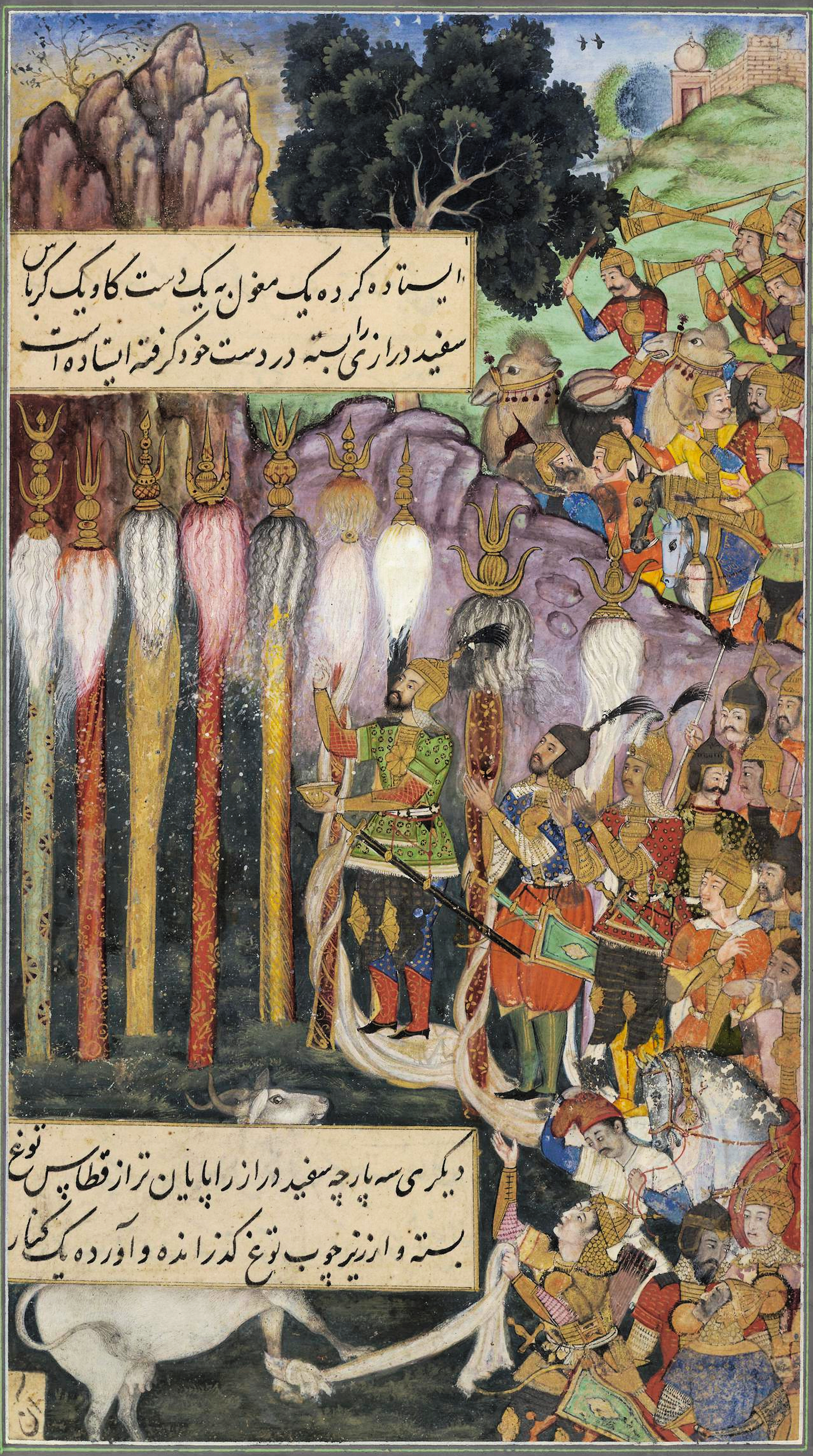
The first Mughal Emperor Babur and his Mughal Army perform a Dua prayer while saluting their standards.

It resulted in Safavid's and Babur's defeat after which he resigned hope of recovering his father's empire of Ferghana. It also helped solidify the alliance between the Mughals and the Ottoman Empire.

The Uzbeks now not only recovered the country which they had lost in Transoxiana, but also made incursions into Khurasan, ravaging the northern part of the province. Shah Ismail I, on hearing of this disaster, resolved to return. On his approach the Uzbeks retreated in alarm. He caused several of the officers who had escaped from the battle to be seized and some of them to be executed for deserting their commander. Certain inhabitants of the province, accused of having shown attachment to the Uzbeks and their creed and of having vexed the Shias, were consumed in the fire of his wrath. The fatal battle of Ghazdewan, the destruction of Babur's Persian allies, and the numbers and power of the Uzbeks seemed to leave him no hopes of again ascending the throne of Samarkand and Bukhara. Babur had now resigned all hopes of recovering Fergana, and although he dreaded an invasion from the Uzbeks to his West, his attention increasingly turned towards India and its lands in the east.
