= Labirut =

Human settlement in Uzbekistan

Coordinates: 40°04′37″N 64°34′12″E

Labirut is a small village in Bukhara region, Uzbekistan. The name Labirut is the combination of two words, Labi, which means the edge and rut which means a small canal. A small canal flows across the village, which gave the name to the village. The population of the village is about 500-1000 people. There is a big grapes garden, an apricot tree yard and a big cemetery.
