= Sadr (title) =

Sadr was primarily used in the Iranian world to designate an exceptional person, such as a scholar. It was initially used as a personal title for major religious scholars in Transoxiana, then also for high-ranking administrative figures, and from c. 1380 until the late 18th-century, for the head of the religious authority of a nation. It was then ultimately used for high-ranking figures in Qajar Iran, including the grand vizier.

== Sources ==
- Floor, Willem (2005). "Ṣadr". In Yarshater, Ehsan (ed.). Encyclopædia Iranica (Online ed.). Encyclopædia Iranica Foundation.
