= Gijduvon =

Gʻijduvon
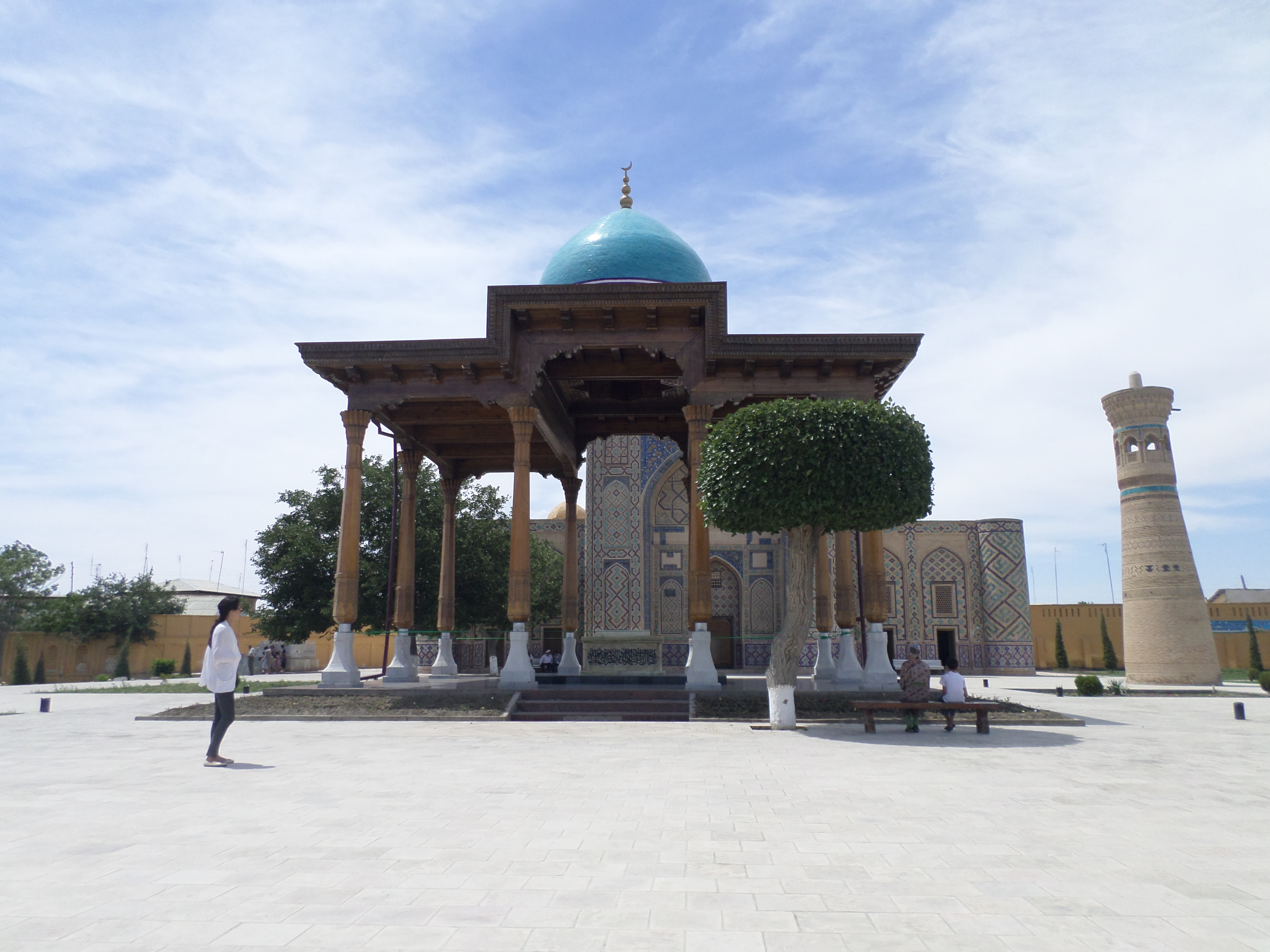
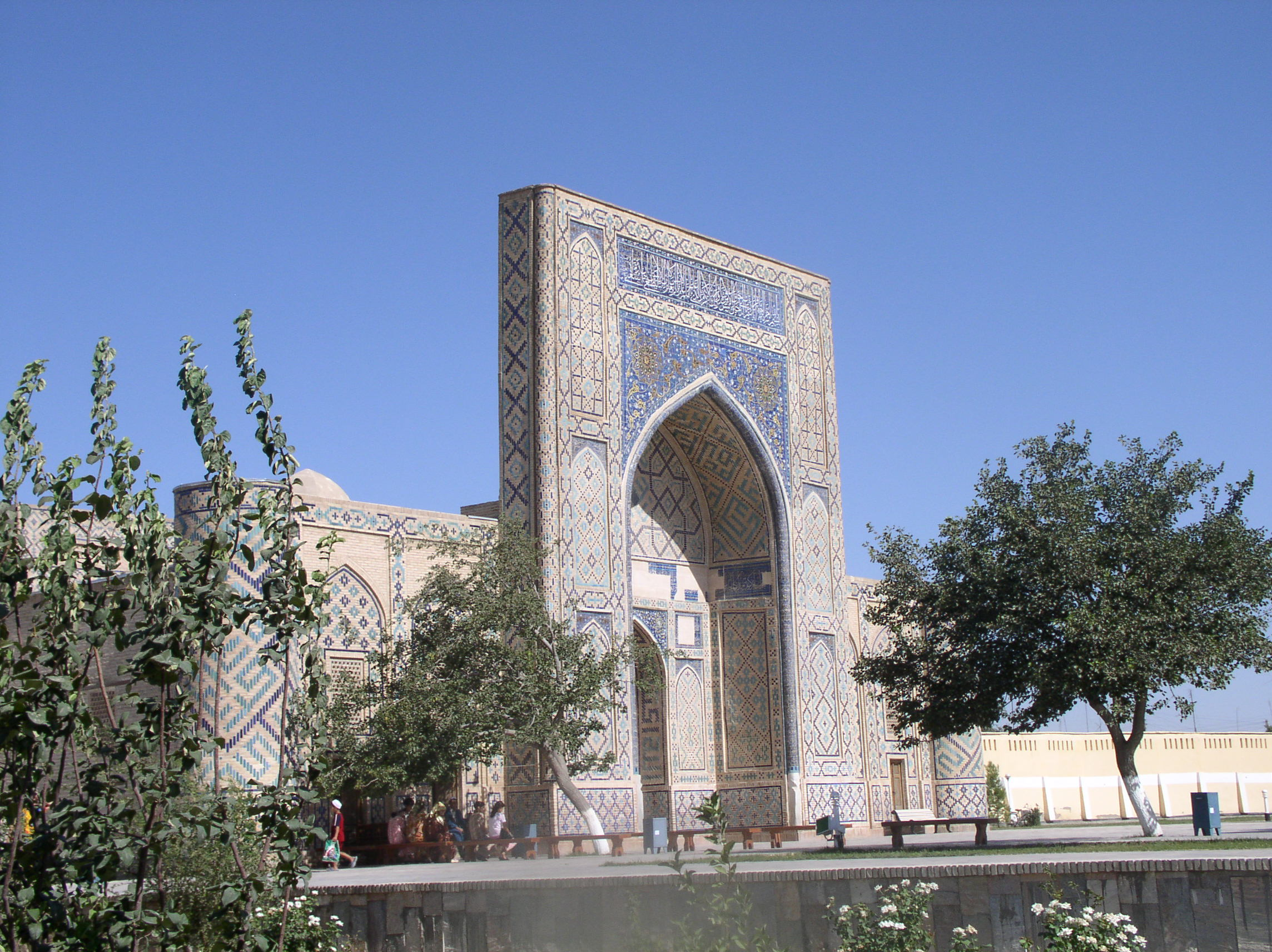
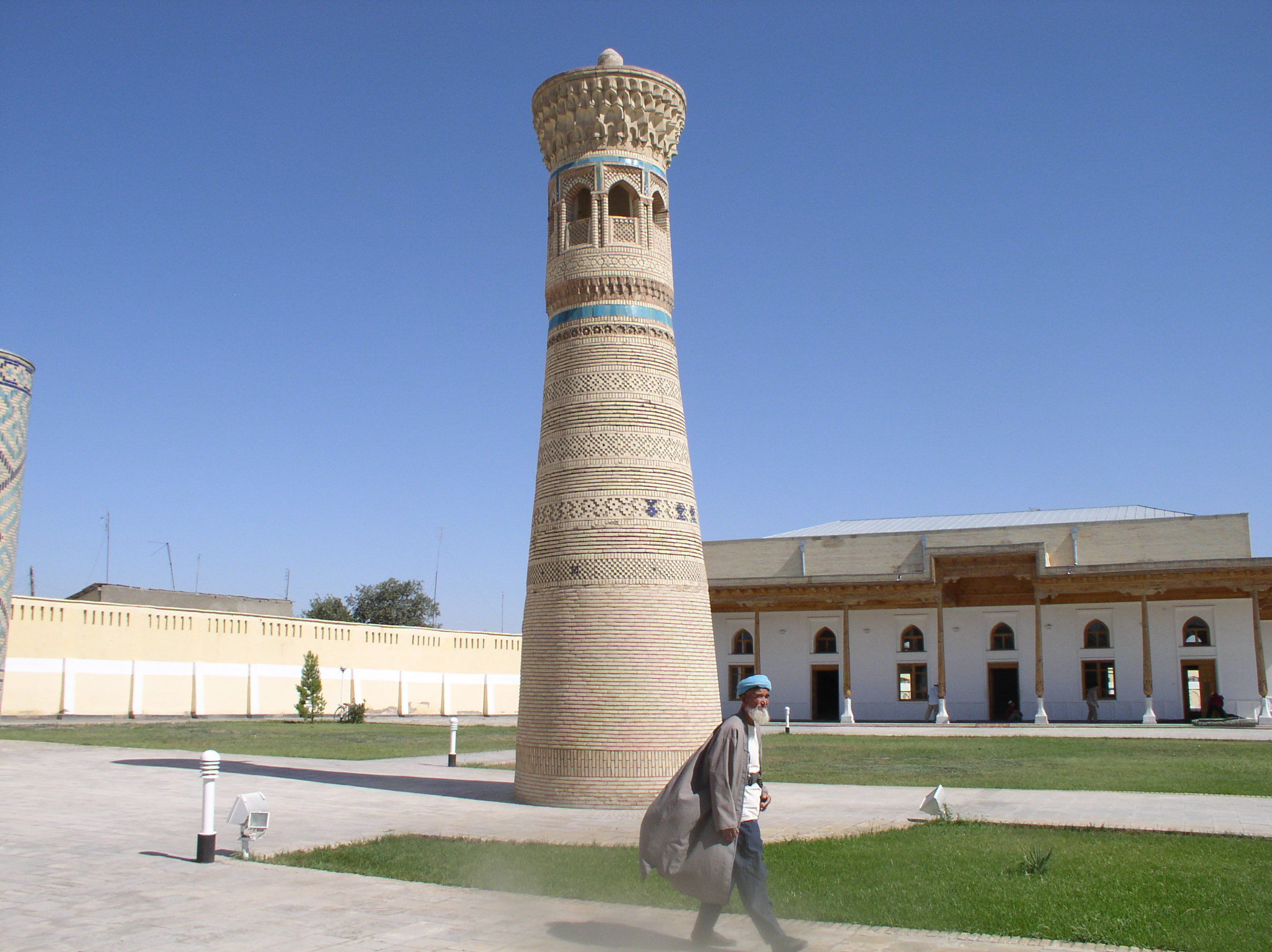

- Location in Uzbekistan
- Coordinates: 40°06′N 64°40′E
- Country: Uzbekistan
- Region: Bukhara Region
- District: Gʻijduvon District

Population (2016)
  - Total: 43,400

Gʻijduvon (Uzbek: Gʻijduvon, Ғиждувон; Tajik: Гиждувон; Russian: Гиждуван) is a city in the Bukhara Region of Uzbekistan and the capital of Gʻijduvon District (tuman). Its population was 38,600 in 2003, and 43,400 in 2016.

== History ==
Archaeological evidence suggests that the settlement in what is now Gʻijduvon was established before the Arab invasion.

The village of Gʻijduvon is mentioned in historical chronicles since the 10th century. It is said that the village received water from the Harkan-rud or Kalkan-rud ditch, also mentioned by the geographers of the 10th century as The Rustak, irrigated by the aryk, was called "Lower Harkana", as opposed to "Upper Harkana" opposite Karmana. Even then it was one of the trade centers of the region, being part of the Samanid Empire.

Gʻijduvon in the 12th century was a bazaar village 6 parasangs from Bukhara. Subsequently, the tuman in which Gʻijduvon was located was called either Gʻijduvon or Harkanrud. The real popularity of the village, which later turned into a town, was brought by one of the representatives of Sufism Abdul Khaliq Ghijduwani, who lived in the XII century in the era of the Turkic dynasty of the Kara-Khanids.

The town of Tavois, founded in the early Middle Ages, competed with Gʻijduvon until the 15th century. However, in subsequent periods, Gʻijduvon became a city and Tavois lost its importance.

From the 16th century under the Uzbek Shaybanid dynasty, Gʻijduvon became a fortress city where battles were often fought. In the Battle of Ghazdewan that took place here, Babur was defeated by the Shaybanids, which put an end to the Timurid dynasty domination in Transoxiana. Under Abdullah Khan II in 1578 near Gʻijduvon a bridge of 13 arches was built across the Zarafshon, apparently serving at the same time as a dam to raise the water in the river and divide it into channels. In "Tarix-i Rakhimhani" it is said that the river here is divided into several rivers, each river - into several branches, each branch - into several channels, as a result of which villages become populated.

One of the three madrasahs built by Ulugh Beg is in Gʻijduvon (the others are in Samarkand and Bukhara), which still stands. The tomb and memorial of the prominent Central Asian philosopher Abduholik Gijduvoni is also located in Gʻijduvon.

Historically, Gʻijduvon is used to be an educational, religious, and cultural center for the region. However, starting from the 1930s the population became increasingly secular and today Islam plays a very minor role in everyday life. Modern Gʻijduvon is a commercial center for not only Gʻijduvon district but also for neighboring areas.

== Cuisine ==
Gʻijduvon is famous for its local cuisine and is considered to have the best fish frying and shashlik making techniques. Shashlik is beef or lamb marinated overnight and grilled on skewers. Many other restaurants in the country, including those in the capital Tashkent copy Gʻijduvon's fish frying technique. The main difference is that in Gʻijduvon cooks de-bone the fish before frying while in the rest of the country fish is not de-boned.

The town is also known for its traditional Persian treats like halva, candies, etc. Many agree that Gʻijduvon was able to cultivate more refined cuisine compared to other parts of the country because it is one of the earliest populated areas in Central Asia. Bukhara, a fifth largest city in Uzbekistan, is about 40 km away that city has been populated for at least five millennium and Gʻijduvon is thought to fall in the same areas as long as its age is concerned.

== Culture ==
The languages spoken in Gʻijduvon are Uzbek, Tajik and Russian. Although the majority of population identifies themselves ethnically as Uzbeks, some oldest families in the city speak Tajik at home.

The city used to have a large Jewish minority who moved to Israel and the United States after the fall of the Soviet Union when economic conditions were difficult.

The foremost sport is soccer.

The city has high schools, a few vocational schools, medical college, hospitals. Gʻijduvon has no higher educational establishments so in order to attend universities the residents travel to Buhkara, Samarkand, Tashkent or other bigger cities.

== Industry ==
Gʻijduvon is in the irrigated cotton growing area of Uzbekistan between the Zeravshan River valley and the Shimolii canal. The town has a cotton processing plant which prepares cotton grown by the farmers in the region for export. Cotton's importance in Uzbekistan's economy has been continuously dropping since the independence in 1991 which is why Gʻijduvon and the region has been diversifying its economy and its agriculture is moving away from cotton and branching into vegetable and fruit farming. Some sectors of the economy like transportation are also on the rise. M34 highway connects Gʻijduvon to other parts of the country including Bukhara, Samarkand and Tashkent.

Historically, the town was famous for its industrious merchants who traveled to other bigger commercial centers and brought various goods to the local market. They seem to uphold that reputation to this day. Local businessmen travel to China, Russia, the Baltic states, Turkey and Iran to buy goods wholesale and bring those goods to Gʻijduvon. These days shoppers from outlying areas come to Gʻijduvon for any type of shopping including groceries, various type of supplies, home appliances and electronics, car parts, clothing, etc. Gʻijduvon has a whole-sale market where merchants from surrounding areas buy their supplies and sell in their shops in rural areas. The town operates a livestock market too where farmers can buy and sell their livestock.

Gʻijduvon craftsmen play important role in the local economy and their work is a major attraction for tourists. The town has a distinct style of the pottery which is defined by applying a unique turquoise-bluish color to the pottery. Some notables including Prince Charles, the Prince of Wales and Hillary Clinton have been to Gʻijduvon to see the work of local craftsmen.

== See also ==
- Labirut
