= Mohammad-Ali Khan (sepahsalar) =

Safavid official and military commander of Lezgian origin

Mohammad-Ali Khan was a Safavid official and military commander of Lezgian origin. He served as a commander-in-chief of the army (sepahsalar) and as a governor (hakem) of the Erivan Province (also known as Chokhur-e Sa'd), during the reign of king Sultan Husayn (1694–1722).

A nephew of grand vizier Fath-Ali Khan Daghestani (1716–1720), Mohammad-Ali Khan served during the chaotic years in which the Safavid state was crumbling and in a state of heavy decline. He was killed in 1716 following a revolt by the people of his province, and was succeeded by his twelve-year old (unnamed) son, who was also appointed governor (vali) of Georgia and of Tabriz.

== Sources ==
- Floor, Willem M. (2008). Titles and Emoluments in Safavid Iran: A Third Manual of Safavid Administration, by Mirza Naqi Nasiri. Washington, DC: Mage Publishers. p. 173. ISBN 978-1933823232.
- Matthee, Rudi (2012). Persia in Crisis: Safavid Decline and the Fall of Isfahan. I.B.Tauris. ISBN 978-1845117450.

| Preceded by Safiqoli Khan | Commander-in-chief (sepahsalar) ?–June 1716 | Succeeded by Fath-Ali Khan Turkoman |
| Preceded by Abd al-Masud Khan | Governor of Erivan Province (Chokhur-e Sa'd) ?–1716 | Succeeded by His son (unknown name) |
