= Alamara-ye Shah Ismail =

17th-century anonymous story of the life of Ismail I

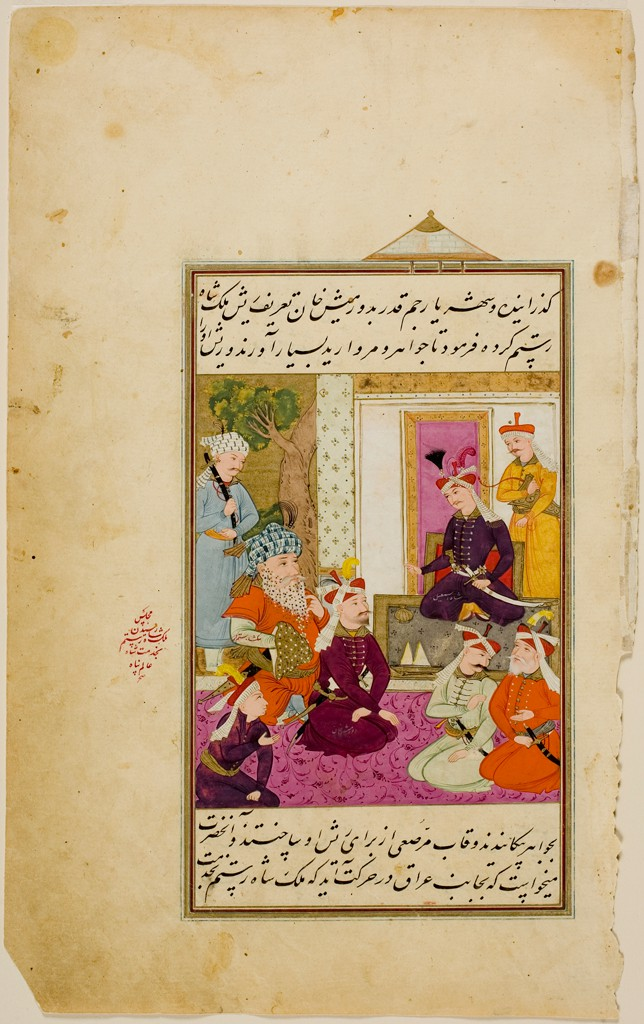
- Folio from a manuscript of the Alamara-ye Shah Ismail depicting governor Shah Rostam Abbasi in the presence of Shah Ismail I. Made by Mo'en Mosavver in Isfahan, dated c. 1688
- Author: Unknown
- Language: Persian
- Genre: History
- Publication date: Late 17th-century
- Publication place: Safavid Iran

The Alamara-ye Shah Ismail (Persian: عالم آرای شاه اسماعیل) is a late 17th-century anonymous story recounting the life of the Safavid shah of Iran, Shah Ismail I (r. 1501–1524). It comes from a common oral storytelling tradition and is linked to a collection of biographies about Ismail I.

== Sources ==
- McChesney, R. (2020). "ʿĀlamārā-ye Šāh Esmāʿīl". Encyclopaedia Iranica Online. Brill. doi:10.1163/2330-4804_EIRO_COM_5112.
