= Wakil =

Arabic term meaning deputy, delegate, or agent

In Islamic law, a wakīl (وكيل), or vakil, is a deputy, delegate or agent who acts on behalf of a Muslim ruler, receives Bay'ah, and officiates Islamic law. It is the Arabic word for an advocate, agent, and a trustee. The latter meaning, along with the name Disposer of affairs, is used as one of the names of God in the Qur'an. Al-Wakil is usually considered the 52nd or the 53rd name of God and it is mentioned in Qur'an multiple times (for example 3:173). In Islam, God is considered the supreme trustee, who can be relied upon to manage all of the affairs perfectly.

== Etymology ==
Vakel or Vakil is the Arabic term used in the meaning of "representative" or "proxy".

The root w-k-l bears meanings of entrusting, assigning, and empowering; some of the other words that are made from this root are توكل (tawakkala, tawakkul) and وكالة (wikāla).

== Usage ==
Some literalist schools like those of Ibn Hazm and Ahmad ibn Hanbal consider those who die without pledging allegiance to a Muslim ruler to be Kuffar. Likewise, Friday prayer officiated by an Imam not representative of the government of a Muslim ruler is considered invalid by the Four Schools of Madhhab, since the title Imam itself is ceremonial in prayer, and actually referring to the Muslim ruler in islamic law.

Whoever dies without having given Bay'ah, has died the death of Jahiliyyah.

— Sahih Muslim, 1851

It can refer to an attorney as well, and a diplomat or the custodian of a mosque or religious order. Agents appointed by slave owners to hunt for fugitive slaves in Ottoman Syria were also referred to as wakīls.

=== Historical usage ===
Vakil or vekil was the term used for the deputies and de facto prime ministers of the Mughal Emperor in Mughal administration. He was considered the most powerful person after Emperor in the Mughal Empire.

Vakil was one of the highest positions in the hierarchy of Safavid Iran, denoting the viceroy in the administrative and some religious affairs of the realm.

In the Ottoman Empire, the viziers were considered "absolute delegates" (vekil-i mutlak) of the Ottoman Sultan.
