= Roger Savory =

Canadian Iranologist (1925–2022)

Roger Mervyn Savory (27 January 1925 – 16 February 2022) was a British-born Professor Emeritus at the University of Toronto who was an Iranologist and specialist on the Safavids. His numerous writings on Safavid political, military history, administration, bureaucracy, and diplomacy-translated into several languages have had a great impact in understanding this period.

== Biography ==
Savory was first introduced to Iranian studies as a young man between 1943 and 1947. He started his formal education in Oxford under Professors Hamilton Gibb, Joseph Schacht and Richard Walzer. In 1950 he began lecturing on Persian at the school of SOAS. He completed his Ph.D. under Ann Lambton and Vladimir Minorsky at SOAS in 1958. He then joined the faculty of University of Toronto and was a major factor in establishing the University of Toronto as one of the forerunners of Middle Eastern and Iranian studies in North America. Savory died on 16 February 2022, at the age of 97.

Besides books and journal articles, he has also contributed to the Encyclopaedia of Islam, Encyclopaedia Iranica, and other encyclopaedias. He also has dozens of book reviews published in peer-review journals.

== Bibliography ==
=== Books ===
- Savory, R. M. & Wickens, G. M. (1964) Persia in Islamic Times: a Practical Bibliography of its History, Culture and Language, W. J. Watson (ed.), Montreal: Institute of Islamic Studies, McGill University.
- Savory, R. M. (ed.) (1976) Introduction to Islamic Civilisation, New York: Cambridge University Press. Reprint. (1980) “Students’ edition,” New Delhi: Vikas.
- Eskandar Beg Monshi (1978) The History of Shaah ‘Abbās the Great (Tārīkh-e ‘Ālamārā-ye ‘Abbāsī), 2 vols., R.M. Savory (trans.), Persian Heritage Series no. 28, Boulder: Westview Press.
- Savory, R. M. (1980) Iran Under the Safavids, Cambridge: Cambridge University Press.
  - (1984) Īrān-e ‘Asr-e Ṣafavī, trans. A. Ṣabā, Tehran.
  - (1993) Īrān-e ‘Asr-e Ṣafavī, trans. K. ‘Azīzī, Tehran.
- Savory, R. M. (1980) The Persian Gulf States: a General Survey, C.E. Bosworth, R.M. Burrel, K.M. Mclachlan & R.M. Savory (eds.), general ed. A.J. Coltrell, Baltimore and London: Johns Hopkins University Press.
- Savory, R. M. & Agius, D. A. (eds.) (1984) Logos Islamikos: Studia Islamica in Honorem Georgii Michaelis Wickens, Papers in Mediaeval Studies no. 6, Toronto: Pontifical Institute of Mediaeval Studies.
- Savory, R. M. (1987) Studies on the History of Safavid Iraan, London: Variorum Reprints.

=== Book chapters ===
- Savory, R. M. (1969) ‘A 15th-Century Ṣafavid propagandist at Harāt’ in The American Oriental Society, Middle West Branch Semi-Centennial Volume, D. Sinor (ed.), Bloomington: Indiana University Press.
- Savory, R. M. (1970) ‘Safavid Persia’ in Cambridge History of Islam, vol. 1, P.M. Holt, A.K.S. Lambton, & B. Lewis (eds.), Cambridge: Cambridge University Press.
- Savory, R. M. (1970) ‘Modern Persia’ in Cambridge History of Islam, vol. 1, P.M. Holt, A.K.S. Lambton, & B. Lewis (eds.), Cambridge: Cambridge University Press.
- Savory, R. M. (1971) ‘Abō’l-Fażl Beyhaqī as an historiographer’ in Yādnāme-ye Abu-l Fadl-e Bayhqī. Meshed: Meshed University Press. (Meshed University, Faculty of Letters and Human Sciences).
- Savory, R. M. (1971) ‘A curious episode of Safavid History’ in Iran and Islam: In Memory of the late Vladimir Minorsky, C.E. Bosworth (ed.), Edinburgh: Edinburgh University Press.
- Savory, R. M. (1972) ‘Iran: a 2,500-year historical and cultural tradition’ in Iranian Civilization and Culture, C.J. Adams (ed.), Montreal: McGill University Press.
  - Also published as Savory, R. M. (1976) ‘The Strong Rope – the Persian historical and cultural tradition’, Farhang-e Īrān-Zamīn/ Revue trimestrielle des Études Iranologiques, vol. 20, pase, 1–4, pp. 35–65.
- Savory, R. M. (1974) ‘The Safavid state and polity’ in Iranian Studies, vol. 7, nos. 1-2: Studies on Isfahan: Proceedings of the Isfahan Colloquium, pt. 1, Boston: Society for Iranian Studies.
- Savory, R. M. (1976) ‘Land of the Lion and the Sun’ in The World of Islam, B. Lewis (ed.), London: Thames and Hudson.
- Savory, R. M. (1978) ‘Social development of Iran in the Pahlavi era’ in Iran Under the Pahlavis, G. Lenczowski (ed.), Stamford: Hoover Institution Press.
- Savory, R. M. (1980) ‘The History of the Persian Gulf: 1. The Ancient Period; 2. A.D. 600-1800’ in The Persian Gulf States: a General Survey, A.J. Cottrell, C.E. Bosworth, R.M. Burrell, K. McLachlan & R.M. Savory (eds.), Baltimore and London: Johns Hopkins University Press.
- Savory, R. M. (1982) ‘Khumayni’s Islamic Revolutionary Movement’ in Iran, Iraq and the Gulf War, Robert Spencer (ed.), Toronto: Centre for International Studies, University of Toronto.
- Savory, R. M. (1982) ‘The religious environment in the Middle East’ in Business and the Middle East: Threats and Prospects, Y. Alexander & R. A. Kilmarx (eds.), New York, Oxford, Toronto: Pergamon Press.
- Savory, R. M. (1983) ‘Religion and government in an Iṯnā ‘Ašarī Šī‘ī State’ in Religion and Government in the World of Islam, J. L. Kraemer & I. Alon (eds.), Tel Aviv. (Proceedings of the Colloquium held at Tel Aviv University, 3–5 June 1979; Israel Oriental Studies, vol. X).
- Savory, R. M. (1986) ‘Mutual Perceptions of the West: Iran’ in ‘As Others See Us: Mutual Perceptions, East and West.’ A special issue of Comparative Civilizations Review, nos. 13–14, Fall 1985 and Spring 1986, New York: International Society for the Comparative Study of Civilizations.
- Savory, R. M. (1986) ‘The Ṣafavid administrative system’ in Cambridge History of Iran, vol. 6, P. Jackson, S. I. Grossman & L. Lockhart (eds.), Cambridge: Cambridge University Press.
- Savory, R. M. (1987) ‘The geopolitical impact of the Islamic Revolution in Iran on the Gulf region’ in The Middle East in Global Strategy, A. Braun (ed.), Boulder, Colorado and London: Westview/Mansell.
- Savory, R. M. (1988) ‘Ex Oriente Nebula: an enquiry into the nature of Khomeini’s ideology’ in Ideology and Power in the Middle East: Studies in Honor of George Lenczowski, P. J. Chelkowski & R. J. Pranger (eds), Durham: Duke University Press.
- Savory, R. M. (1989) ‘Islam and democracy: the case of the Islamic Republic of Iran’ in The Islamic World from Classical to Modern Times: Essays in Honor of Bernard Lewis, C.E. Bosworth, C. Issawi, R. M. Savory, & A.L. Udovitch (eds.), Princeton: Darwin Press.
- Savory, R. M. (1990) ‘The export of Ithnā ‘Asharī Shī‘ism: historical and ideological background’ in The Iranian Revolution and the Muslim World, D. Menashri (ed.), Boulder: Westview Press.
- Savory, R. M. (1990) ‘Religious dogma and the economic and political imperatives of Iranian foreign policy’ in Iran at the Crossroads: Global Relations in a Turbulent Decade, Westview Special Studies on the Middle East, M. Rezun (ed.), Boulder: Westview Press.
- Savory, R. M. (1991) ‘Orthodoxy and aberrancy in the Ithnā ‘Asharī Shī‘ī Tradition’ in Islamic Studies Presented to Charles J. Adams, W. B. Hallaq & D. P. Little (eds.), Leiden: Brill.
- Savory, R. M. (1994) ‘The Shī‘ī enclaves in the Deccan (15th-17th centuries): an historical anomaly’ in Corolla Torontonensis: Studies in Honor of Ronald Morton Smith, E. Robbins & S. Sandahl (eds.), Toronto: TSAR with the assistance of the Centre for Korean Studies, University of Toronto.
- Savory, R. M. (1995) ‘Taḥlīlī az tārīkh va tārīkh-nigārī-yi davrān-i Ṣafavīyah’ in Īrān Nāmeh: a Persian Journal of Iranian Studies, vol. XIII, no. 3, Summer 1995, pp. 277–300. [English title: “Is there an ultimate use for historians? Reflections on Ṣafavid history and historiography.”]
- Savory, R. M. (1998) ‘The visit of three Qājār princes to England (May–September 1836/Safar-Jumādā I 1252)’ in Iran and Iranian Studies: Essays in Honor of Iraj Afshar, K. Eslami (ed.), Princeton: Zagros Press.
- Savory, R. M. (2002) ‘The Qājārs: ‘The last of the Qezelbāš’ in Society and Culture in Qājār Iran: Studies in Honor of Ḥāfez Farmāyān, E. L. Daniel (ed.), Costa Mesa: Mazda.
- Savory, R. M. (2003) ‘Tajlu Khanum: Was she captured by the Ottomans at the Battle of Chaldiran or not?’ in Irano-Turkic Cultural Contacts in the 11th/17th Centuries, E. M. Jeremias (ed.),. Pilisesaba: Avicenna Institute of Middle East Studies.
- Savory, R. M. (2003) ‘Roger M. Savory on Vladimir Fedorovich Minorsky’ in The Best Teacher I Ever Had, A. C. Michalos (ed.), London: Althouse Press.
- Savory, R. M. (1988) ‘Iran 1501 – 1629’, in P. Burke & H. Inalcik (eds.), History of Humanity: Scientific and Cultural Development, vol. 5, pp. 258–263, Paris: UNESCO.

=== Articles and book reviews in academic journals ===
The list of Journal Abbreviations are in the footnotes

=== Articles in academic journals ===
- Savory, R. M. (1960) ‘Persia since the Constitution’, University of Toronto Quarterly, vol. 24, no.2, pp. 243–261.
- Savory, R. M. (1960) ‘The principal offices of the Ṣafawid state during the reign of Ismā‘īl I (907-30/1501-24)’, BSOAS, vol. 23, pt. 1, pp. 91–105.
- Savory, R. M. (1961) ‘The principal offices of the Ṣafawid state during the reign of Ṭahmāsp I (930-84/1524-76)’, BSOAS, vol. 24, pt. 1, pp. 65–85.
- Savory, R. M. (1962) ‘Communication [Intention to translate the Futuvvat-nāma of Ḥusayn Vā‘ẓ Kāshifī]’, ISL, vol. 38, no. 1–2, pp. 161–165.
- Savory, R. M. (1963) ‘A secretarial career under Shah Tahmasp I (1524-76)’, Islamic Studies: Journal of the Central Institute of Islamic Research, Karachi, vol. 2, no. 3, pp. 343–352.
- Savory, R. M. (1964) ‘Some notes on the provincial administration of the early Ṣafawid empire’, BSOAS, vol. 27, pt. 1, pp. 114–129.
- Savory, R. M. (1964) ‘The struggle for supremacy in Persia after the death of Timur’, ISL, vol. 40, no. 1, pp. 35–65.
- Savory, R. M. (1964) ‘The significance of the political murder of Mirza Salman’, Islamic Studies: Journal of the Central Institute of Islamic Research, Karachi, vol. 3, no. 2, pp. 181–191.
- Savory, R. M. (1965) ‘The consolidation of Ṣafawid power in Persia’, ISL, vol. 41, pp. 71–94.
- Savory, R. M. (1965) ‘The office of Khalīfat al-Khulafā under the Ṣafawids’, JAOS, vol. 85, no. 4, pp. 497–502.
- Savory, R. M. (1967) ‘The Sherley myth’, Iran: Journal of the British Institute of Persian Studies, vol. 5, pp. 73–81.
- Savory, R. M. (1968) ‘Notes on the Ṣafavid state’, Iranian Studies: Bulletin of the Society for Iranian Cultural and Social Studies, vol. 1, no. 3, pp. 96–103.
- Savory, R. M. (1971) ‘The emergence of the modern Persian state under the Ṣafavids’, Īrān-Shināsī: Journal of Iranian Studies, Faculty of Letters and Humanities, Tehran University, vol. 2, no. 2, pp. 1–44.
- Savory, R. M. (1972) ‘British and French diplomacy in Persia, 1800-1810’, Iran, vol. 10, pp. 31–44.
- Savory, R. M. (1972) ‘The principle of homeostasis considered in relation to political events in Iran in the 1960s’, International Journal of Middle East Studies, vol. 3, pp. 282–302.
- Savory, R. M. (1975) ‘The Qizilbāsh: education and the arts’, Turcica, vol. 6, pp. 168–176.
- Savory, R. M. (1976) ‘Some reflections on totalitarian tendencies in the Ṣafavid state’, ISL, vol. 53, no. 2, pp. 226–241.
- Savory, R. M. (1979) ‘Turmoil in Iran’, MEF, vol. 1, no. 6, pp. 8–12.
- Savory, R. M. (1979) ‘The problem of sovereignty in an Ithna Ashari (“Twelver”) Shi‘i state’, MER, vol. 11, no. 4, 1979, pp. 5–11. Reprinted in (1981) Religion and Politics in the Middle East, Westview special studies on the Middle East, M. Curtis (ed.), Boulder: Westview Press.
- Savory, R. M. (1980) ‘Very dull and arduous reading: a reappraisal of the history of Shah ‘Abbas the Great by Iskandar Beg Munshi’, Hamdard Islamicus: Quarterly Journal of the Hamdard National Foundation, Pakistan, vol. 3, no. 1, pp. 19–37.
- Savory, R. M. (1986) ‘The geo-political impact of the Islamic revolution in Iran on the Persian Gulf region’, MEF, vol. 8, no. 5, pp. 15–23.
- Savory, R. M. (1986) ‘The added touch: Ithna ‘Ashari Shi‘ism and the foreign policy of Iran’, IJ, vol. 41, no. 2, pp. 402–423.
- Savory, R. M. (1995) ‘The office of Sipahsālār (Commander-in-Chief) in the Safavid state’, Proceedings of the Second European Conference of Iranian Studies. Rome, pp. 597–615.
- Savory, R. M. (2004) ‘Relations between the Safavid state and its non-Muslim minorities’, Islam and Christian-Muslim Relations, vol. 14, no. 4, pp. 435–458.
