= Abdurahmon Mushfiqi =

16th-century Tajik poet and satirist

- عبد الرحمن مشفقی بخارایی
- Born: c. 1525; Bukhara, Khanate of Bukhara
- Died: 1588; Bukhara, Khanate of Bukhara
- Occupations: Poet; Satirist; Librarian
- Writing career
- Language: Tajik
- Period: 16th century
- Genres: Ghazal; Qasida; Satire; Masnavi; Rubaiyat
- Notable works: Divan-i mutayibat; Gulzar-i Iram; Saqi-nama; Jahan-nama
- Movement: Tajik literature

Abdurahmon Mushfiqi Bukhoroi (Persian: عبد الرحمن مشفقی بخارایی; ; Tajik: Абдураҳмон Мушфиқи Бухороӣ; c. 1525–1588), also known as Mullo Mushfiqi, was a 16th-century Tajik poet and satirist. Born in Bukhara, he worked in Samarkand and later at the court of the Khanate of Bukhara. He is best known for his sharp humor and satire, but also wrote ghazals, qasidas and longer narrative poems.

His poems often drew on everyday speech and the lives of ordinary people, alongside the traditional themes of Persian poetry. His work brought him recognition at court, where Abdullah Khan II appointed him malik al-shu'ara (chief court poet).

He was born around 1525, although his exact birth year is uncertain. He died in Bukhara in 1588.

== Biography ==
=== Early life and education ===
Mushfiqi was born in Bukhara, a major centre of learning and Tajik poetry in Central Asia. His family had roots in Merv, and Mushfiqi was sometimes called Marvazi because of this family connection. He lost both parents while still young and received help from a family of artisans in Bukhara. His early life among working people later found its way into his poetry. He attended a madrasa, studying astronomy, astrology and philosophy, before turning to poetry.

Mushfiqi developed a reputation for wit and satire while still young. Like many poets of his time, he also wrote verses praising wealthy and powerful people in hopes of gaining their support. At first, however, he had little success.

=== Years in Samarkand ===
Around 1564, Mushfiqi moved to Samarkand to find work. He became a librarian in the service of Sultan Sa'id, who ruled from 1568 to 1572. The position did not end his money troubles, and he sometimes wrote to powerful patrons about his difficulties. He continued to write and collect his ghazals during these years. His first collection, completed in 1566 and dedicated to Sultan Sa'id, contained about 2,000 couplets. A second, compiled in 1578, contained about 2,100.

In 1572, he wrote a poem praising Abdullah Khan, hoping the ruler would help him return to Bukhara. The appeal failed, and Mushfiqi continued looking for a secure position.

=== Journey to Mughal India ===
In 1577, Mushfiqi travelled to Mughal India in search of a patron. He met Emperor Akbar and wrote poems in his praise, but did not secure a lasting position at court. His poems about the journey describe hardship and disappointment, and suggest that he came to regret going to India. He returned to Central Asia by 1578 and was finally welcomed into Abdullah Khan's court in Bukhara.

=== Later life at the Bukharan court ===
At the court of Abdullah Khan II, Mushfiqi became malik al-shu'ara, or chief court poet. He spent his later years in more comfortable circumstances. He wrote qasidas celebrating the ruler's achievements, including the capture of Tashkent in 1579 and a victory over the governor of Turkestan in 1583. Even as a court poet, he sometimes wrote about poverty, injustice and the behavior of officials. One of his later qasidas asked Abdullah Khan to protect people from oppression. He remained in Bukhara until his death in 1588.

== Literary works ==
Mushfiqi wrote ghazals, qasidas, rubaiyat, qit'as, mukhammas and masnavis. His poems range from love lyrics and praise of rulers to satire and longer stories in verse.

=== Poetry collections ===
His principal works include:

- Divan-i ghazaliyat (Collection of Ghazals) – Two collections of ghazals, compiled in 1566 and 1578, containing approximately 4,100 couplets in total.
- Divan-i qasa'id (Collection of Qasidas) – A collection of poems praising rulers and other influential figures.
- Divan-i mutayibat (Collection of Humorous Poems), also known as Divan-i hajviyat (Collection of Satires) – A collection of humorous and satirical poetry compiled around 1558.
- Gulzar-i Iram (The Garden of Iram) – A romantic narrative poem written around 1571–1572.
- Saqi-nama (The Cupbearer's Book) – A short poem with mystical themes.
- Jahan-nama (The Book of the World) – A historical poem about Abdullah Khan II.

His collection of satire was unusual for its time: he is considered the only Tajik poet known to have assembled a separate divan devoted to satirical verse.

=== Satirical poetry ===
Satire made Mushfiqi especially popular. He wrote about familiar situations and people, often using lively dialogue and simple language. Fellow poets, artisans, judges, religious figures and the wealthy all appeared in his jokes and criticism. Some poems gently mocked individuals; others attacked greed, hypocrisy and unfair treatment. His sharper criticism sometimes reached powerful people, although his tone became more cautious once he found work at court. One of his best-known satires is Division of the Inheritance (Persian: تقسیم میراث, romanized: Taqsimi meros), a poem criticizing injustice in society.

=== Love poetry ===
Mushfiqi also wrote many love ghazals. They speak of longing, separation, jealousy and the pain of being apart from a loved one. Many of these poems focus on human feelings rather than mystical love. Their language is often direct, even when they use familiar images from Persian poetry.

=== Social and religious criticism ===
Mushfiqi did not limit his criticism to individual rivals. He also wrote against abusive officials, exploitation by the wealthy and hypocrisy among religious figures. Some of these poems challenged religious hypocrisy and the use of religious divisions to justify violence. They were written during a period of conflict between the Safavid and Shaybanid states. His poems also addressed the hardships of ordinary people, including poverty and oppression.

=== Narrative poetry ===
Mushfiqi also told stories in verse. His Gulzar-i Iram (The Garden of Iram) was completed around 1571–1572 and contains about 1,140 couplets. It follows two lovers who face a series of obstacles before finding happiness. The characters' names reflect feelings and personal qualities. While the poem draws on Persian romantic tradition, its story and language are closer to popular tales.

His other longer works include Saqi-nama (The Cupbearer's Book), which has mystical themes, and Jahan-nama (The Book of the World), a poem about Abdullah Khan's military campaigns. Jahan-nama, also called Tarikh-i Abdullah Khan (History of Abdullah Khan), is now lost.

== Literary style and legacy ==
Mushfiqi moved easily between the formal style of court poetry and the language of everyday life. He could praise a ruler in one poem and make fun of greed or hypocrisy in another. His writing also included love poetry and stories in verse.

His humor was easy to remember and retell. Stories about the poet's own clever remarks spread under the name Mullo Mushfiqi, making him a character in popular folklore as well as a historical writer. These stories resemble tales of Nasriddin Khoja, in which a witty answer exposes someone else's foolishness. The humorous stories sometimes drew more attention than his ghazals and narrative poems. His surviving work, however, shows a poet who wrote across many genres and helped shape the tradition of Tajik satire.

=== Remembrance and burial site ===
Mushfiqi's grave was still being sought centuries after his death. During a visit to Bukhara in 1950, Sadriddin Ayni tried to find it, as recorded in a travel account by Sotim Ulughzoda. The group searched near the former Miron street and Kosagaron pond, but changes to the neighborhood made the site difficult to identify. Local residents disagreed about its location, and one of Ayni's companions offered to investigate whether the grave could be found and a memorial restored.

A street in Dushanbe, Tajikistan, is named after Mushfiqi.
