= Bukhara Mosque =

- Buxoro namozgohi
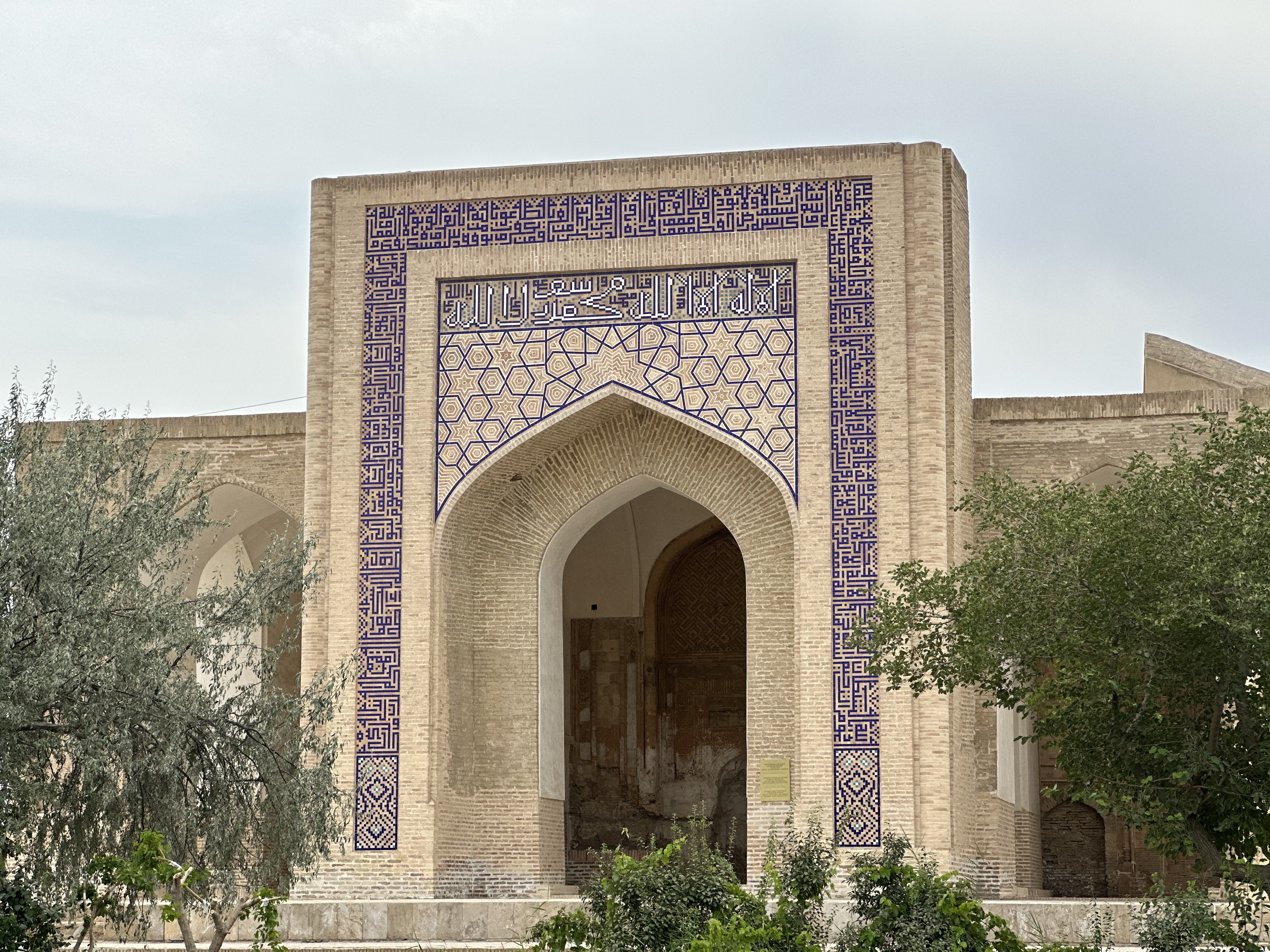
- Interactive map of the Bukhara Mosque area
- Alternative names: Namozgoh Mosque

General information
- Type: Mosque
- Architectural style: Islamic
- Location: Bukhara, Uzbekistan
- Coordinates: 39.7617°N 64.4119°E
- Year built: 11th-16th centuries
- Construction started: 1121
- Construction stopped: 1535
- Renovated: 14th century, 16th century

Height
- Height: 45.6 m (150 ft)

Technical details
- Material: Baked bricks, tiles

Design and construction
- Known for: One of the oldest surviving mosques in Central Asia

The Bukhara Mosque (Uzbek: Buxoro namozgoh; other names: Namozgoh Mosque) is a historical monument in Bukhara. It is one of the mosques built for praying during Eid festivals. It was built behind the gate of the prayer hall in the southern part of Bukhara by Shams al-Mulk (1068-1080), who ruled Bukhara under the Kara-Khanid dynasty, in the 11th century. It was built in the 11th-16th centuries.

== History ==
The mosque's facade is on the west side, with a mihrab in the center of the mosque, made of baked bricks. The arch is decorated with carved and glazed tiles. The mosque was destroyed and demolished in the 11th century. In 1119–1120, by the order of Muhammad Arslan ibn Sulaymon, the ruler of the Qarakhanid state, a new arch was built in place of the old prayer hall, with a mihrab and a place for the nobles. The mosque has survived to this day in its rebuilt form. The mihrab of the mosque is decorated with complex geometric patterns, "almonds", and floral motifs. The names of Muhammad and his companions are written in calligraphic letters on the upper part of the mihrab. In the 14th century, the first half of the mosque was renovated and a panel of inscriptions was installed. At the end of the 14th century, the mosque was renovated according to Amir Temur's decree. In the 16th century, the mosque was renovated again during the reign of Shaybanid Abdullah Khan II. The mosque was surrounded by scenic and fruit trees and fenced with a wall. The phrase "The kingdom belongs to Allah" is written in Kufic script on the mihrab of the prayer hall. A part of a hadith is preserved in Suls script in the inner courtyard of the mosque. Some fragments of inscription panels are preserved on the upper part of the outer wall of the mosque. They mainly contain verses from the Quran and excerpts from hadiths.

== Architecture ==
The mosque is built of simple baked bricks, surrounded by a high wall. In the 16th century, during the renovation period, a three-domed and columned porch was added to the mosque building. The plan is rectangular, consisting of three main rooms. The central room has a flat dome, while the side rooms have domed domes. The main room is accessed through a portal, while the side rooms are accessed through a corridor. The portal is decorated with geometric patterns and verses from the Quran. The mihrab and its surroundings are distinguished by the carved and glazed tiles in the architecture of the Bukhara Mosque. They reflect the traditions of Bukhara architecture and decorative art.
