= Ulugbek Madrasah (Gijduvan) =

Madrasa in Bukhara, Uzbekistan

- Ulugʻbek madrasasi (Uzbek)
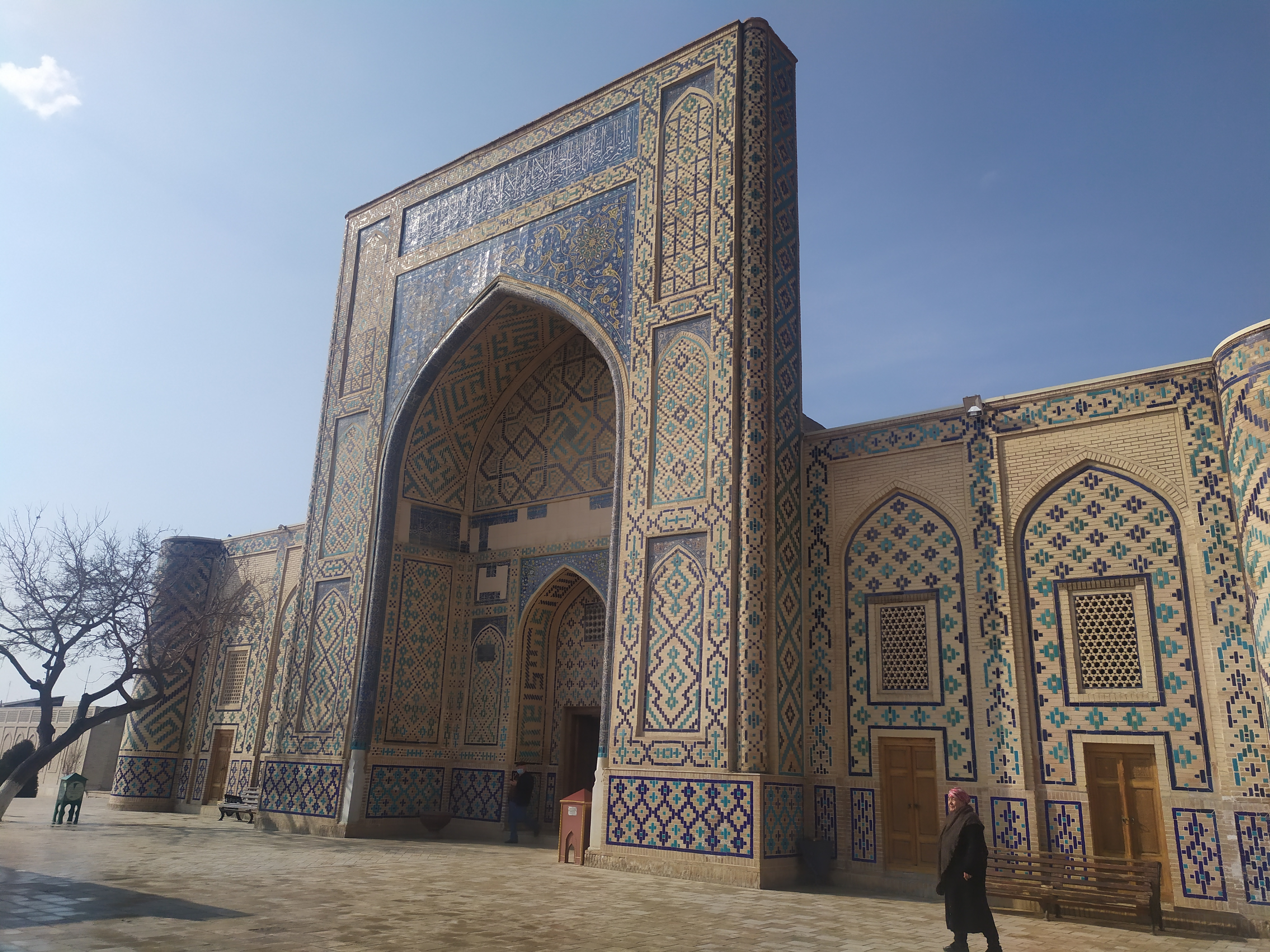
- Interactive map of Ulugbek Madrasah
- 40°06′11″N 64°40′38″E
- Location: Bukhara, Uzbekistan
- Nearest city: Bukhara

History
- Built: 1433
- Built for: Madrasah

Ulugbek Madrasah is a memorial to Abdul Khaliq Ghijduwani, located in the city of Gijduvon in the Bukhara region of Uzbekistan. It is one of the ancient and renowned madrasas of Bukhara, also known as the "Fayziya Madrasah." Presently, it is also referred to as the Mirzo Ulugbek Madrasa. This prestigious educational institution was built in the Hijri year 836 (corresponding to 1432/33 in the Gregorian calendar) beside the grave of Shaykh Abdul Khaliq Ghijduwani, with a two-story structure made of baked bricks. The Ulugbek Madrasah, established by Ulugh Beg, is the third and last madrasa he founded, relatively smaller and simpler compared to the Ulugbek Madrasah in Bukhara and Samarkand .

== History ==
Ulugbek Madrasah located in Gijduvon was situated along the great caravan route of the Timurid era, known as the "Silk Road," which connected Bukhara to Samarkand. It was strategically located within the Timurid state, serving as a pivotal point connecting the northern region of Khorezm with the southern regions of Rum (Anatolia) and Persia, fulfilling its role as a connecting point. According to the scholars of Bukhara, Ulugh Beg personally supervised the construction of the madrasa in Gijduvon. This madrasa stands as a testament to the belief held by Ulugh Beg. It was esteemed by scholars such as Amir Temur, Yusuf Hamadani, Abdul Khaliq Ghijduwani, Ahmad Yasawi, and Baha' al-Din Naqshband. A grand dome was erected over the tomb of Ahmad Yasawi in Turkistan.

Based on the research of the orientalist and historian Abdusattor Jumanazar, the Ulugbek Madrasah was built in the Hijri year 836 (corresponding to 1432/33 in the Gregorian calendar). It was a two-story structure with 20 rooms, including classrooms and a mosque. The madrasa accommodated 40 students under the guidance of its instructor. Over time, it deteriorated and currently exists in a partially restored state, with only one floor remaining. The maintenance of the educational building was mandated to be renovated annually and distributed among the remaining parts after its demolition. In 1583, it underwent specific restoration by Abdullah Khan II.

While the madrasa was operational in an area that wasn't extensively large ("Hojai Jahon sarmozori"), seven educational centers were active until the Bukhara Revolution. Instruction continued until the outbreak of the revolution, after which the school fell into disrepair. In 1933, scholars V. Shishkin, V. Nilsen, and I. Notkin conducted research and determined the measurements of the madrasa. In the 1950s, the madrasa was converted into a warehouse where chemicals like saltpeter and ammonium phosphate were stored.

In 1993, on the occasion of the 890th anniversary of Abdul Khaliq Ghijduwani, the Ulugbek Madrasah underwent restoration. In 2003, a large, dome-shaped cupola was erected above the mausoleum of Abdul Khaliq Ghijduwani, and a garden was established. The cupola's coverings were redone, and the older section of the madrasa, the mausoleum, and the newly constructed mosque were refurbished to meet modern standards. Presently, the madrasa's classrooms host a branch of the Bukhara Museum, and its mosque houses a library, continuing its activities.

== Architecture ==
The madrasa, constructed by Ulugh Beg with two stories, now remains a single-story structure. It is a single-story, rectangular building (33×30 meters), comprising a mosque, classrooms, and chambers. The entrance is notably deep-set. In the center lies a courtyard, with a mosque and classrooms on two sides (8×4.6 meters) adorned with floral motifs on the corners. The entrance to the courtyard is through a portal-like door from the vestibule. The courtyard (15x13 meters) is surrounded by eight chambers, four of which are rectangular and the others are domed. The primary structure of the Ulugbek Madrasah, dating back to the 15th century, retains its original dome and minaret. The front bears the name "Ulugh Beg" and the construction date. Adjacent to the front side is the grave of Shaykh Abdul Khaliq Ghijduwani. The entrance side boasts an elevated, vaulted portal adorned with alcoves and fitted with latticed windows for ventilation. The outer facades have been restored with decorative glazed tiles.

== Literatures ==
=== Books ===
- Hamroyev A. H., Rahmonova M. A. History of Khoja Abdulkhaliq Giduvani Complex and Ulugbek Madrasah. Bukhara: Bukhara, 2003 - 87 pages.
- Jumanazar A. K. History of Bukhara education system. Tashkent: Akademnashr, 2017 - 592 pages. ISBN 978-9943-4728-2-2.
- Jumanazar A. K. Karatash. Tashkent: Akademnashr, 2022 - 512 pages. ISBN 978-9943-8188-7-3.
- Transoxiana scientific centers. Tashkent: International Islamic Academy of Uzbekistan, 2022 - 480 pages. ISBN 978-9943-7559-5-6.
- Soviet encyclopedia of Uzbekistan. XI roof. Tashkent: General editorial office of the Uzbek Soviet Encyclopedia, 1978 - 656 pages.

=== Articles ===
- Shishkin V. A. (1933) (ru). Medrese Ulugbeka v Gijduvane (Materially Uzkomstarisa nash

== Gallery ==
Gallery

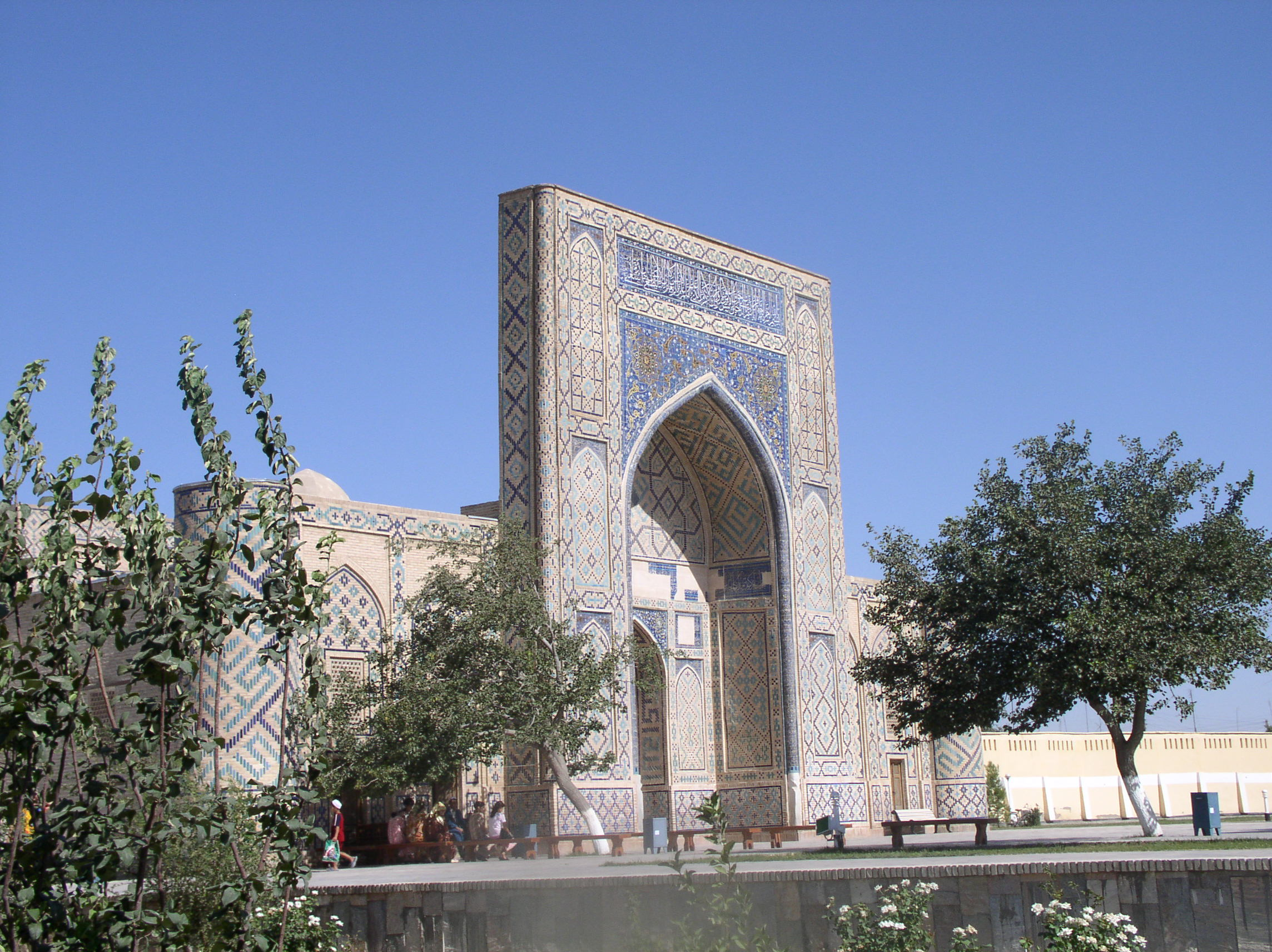
Ulugbek Madrasah

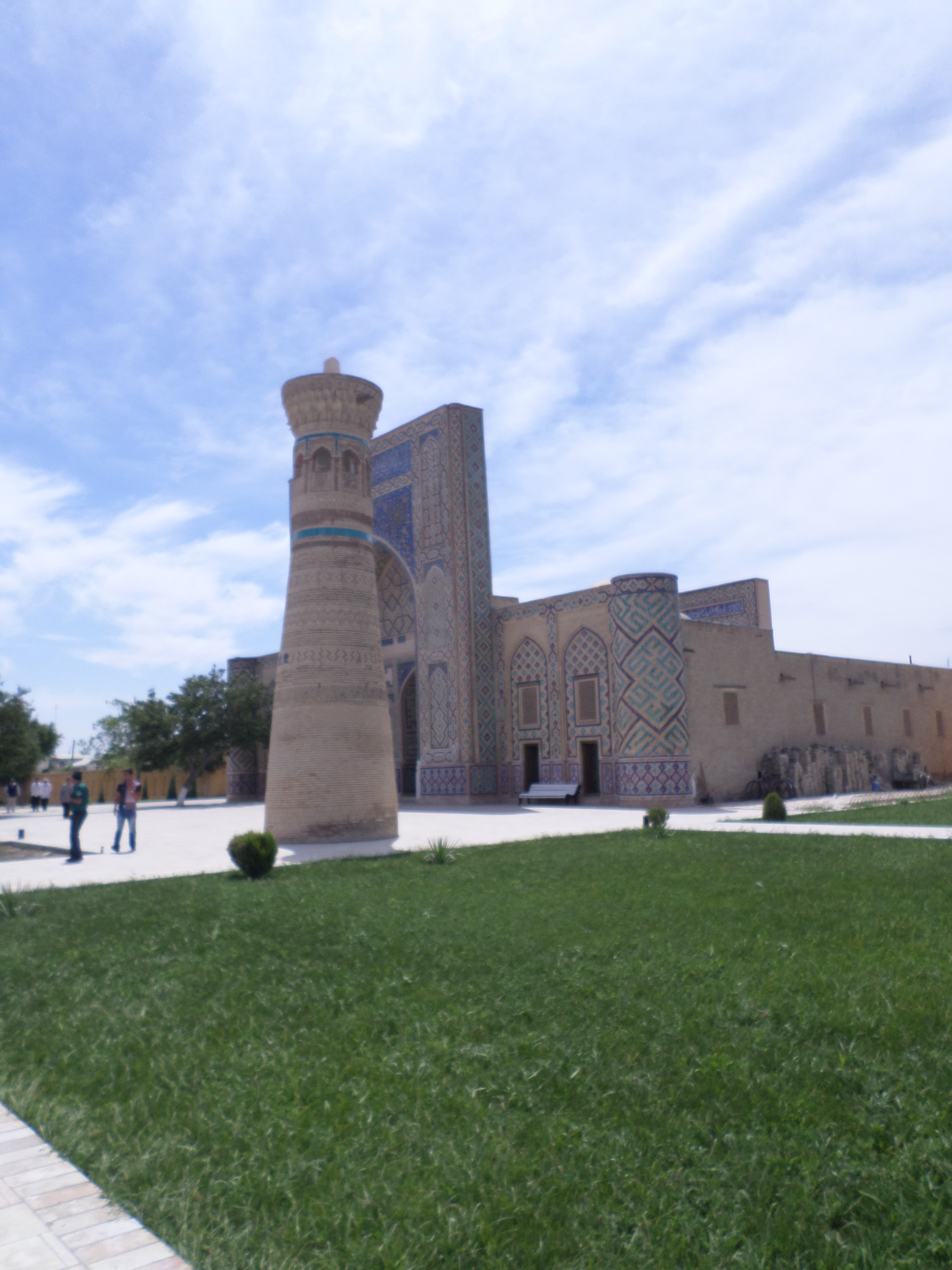
Ulugbek Madrasah

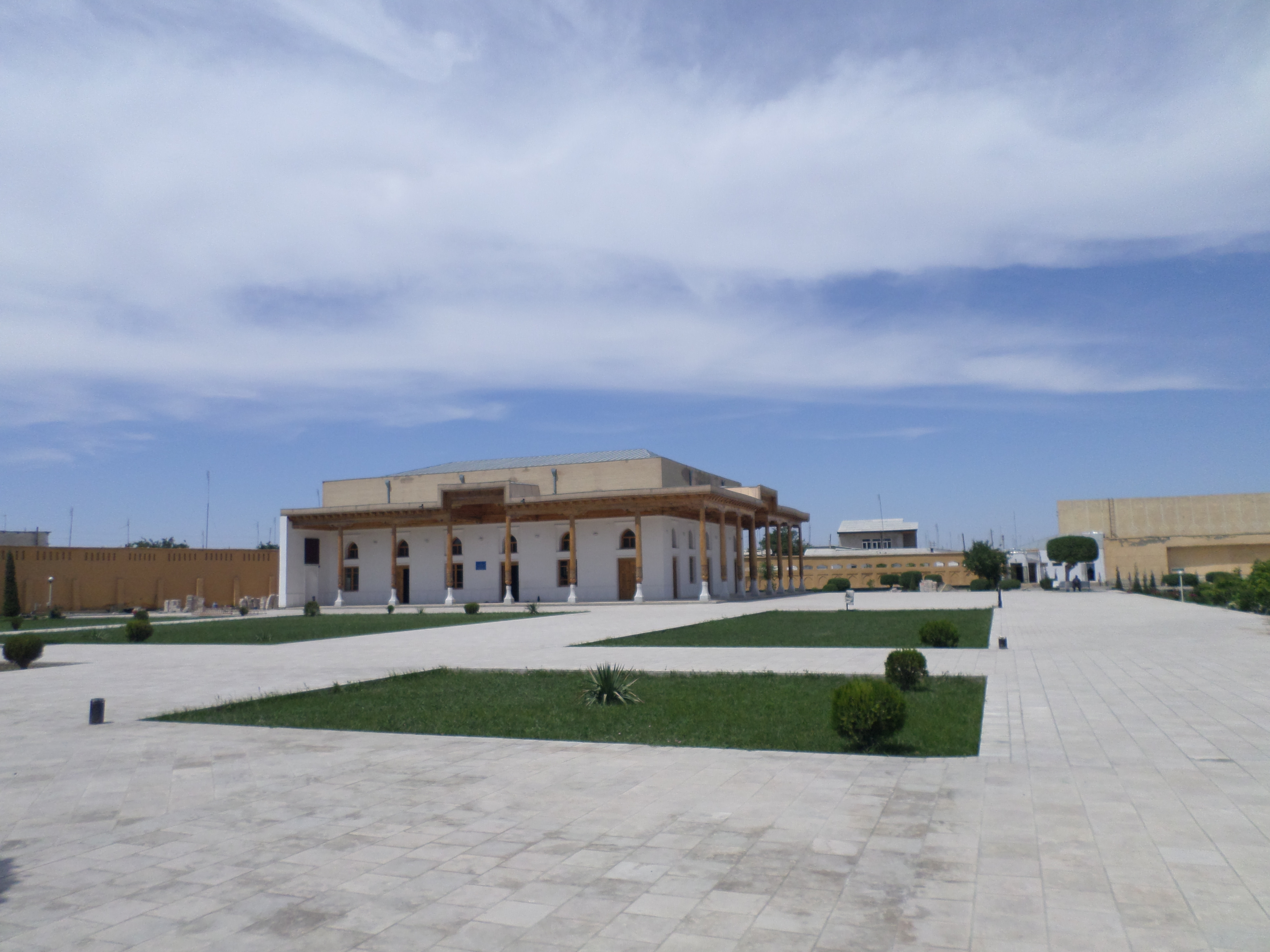
Ulugbek Madrasah

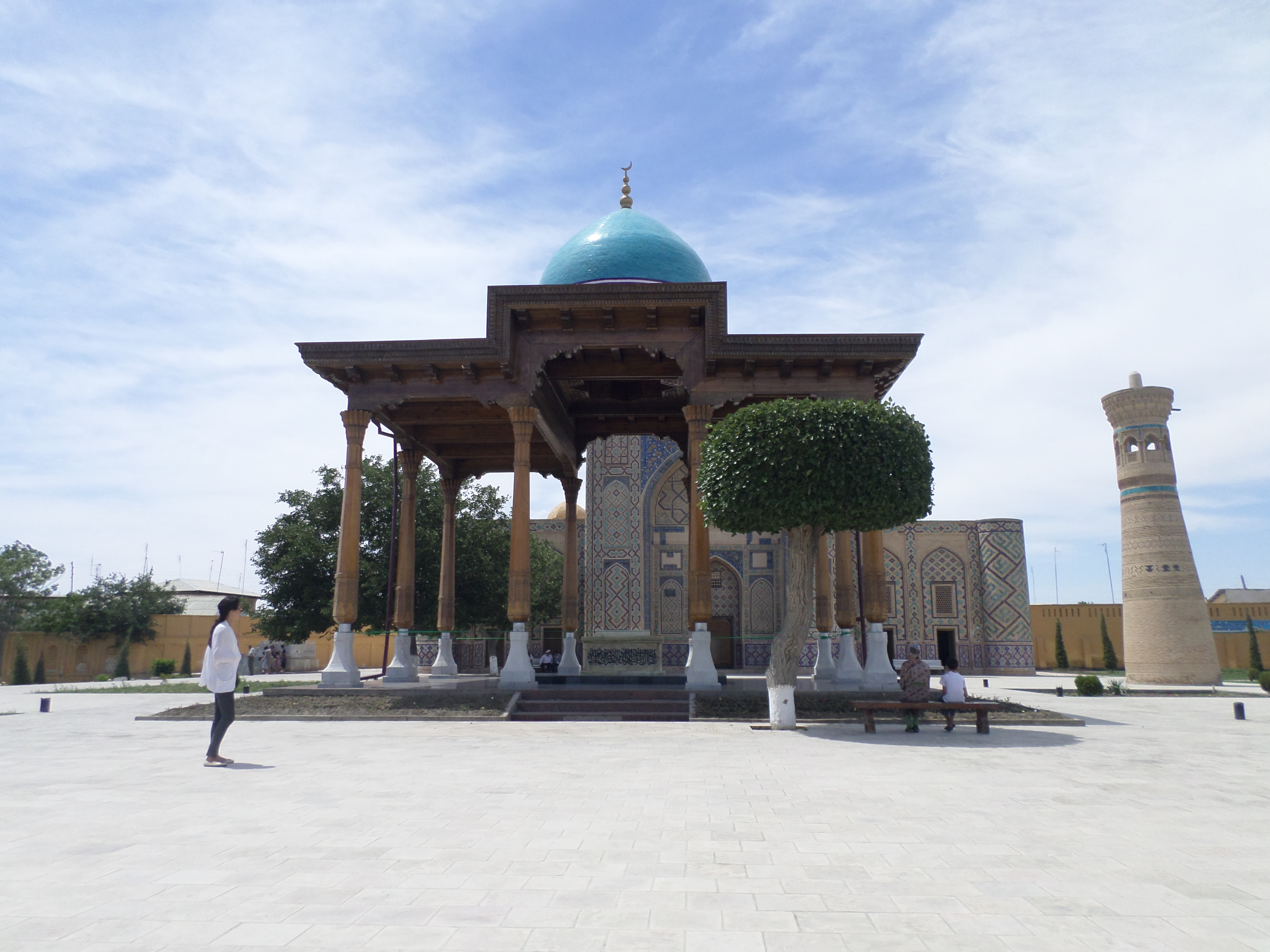
Ulugbek Madrasah

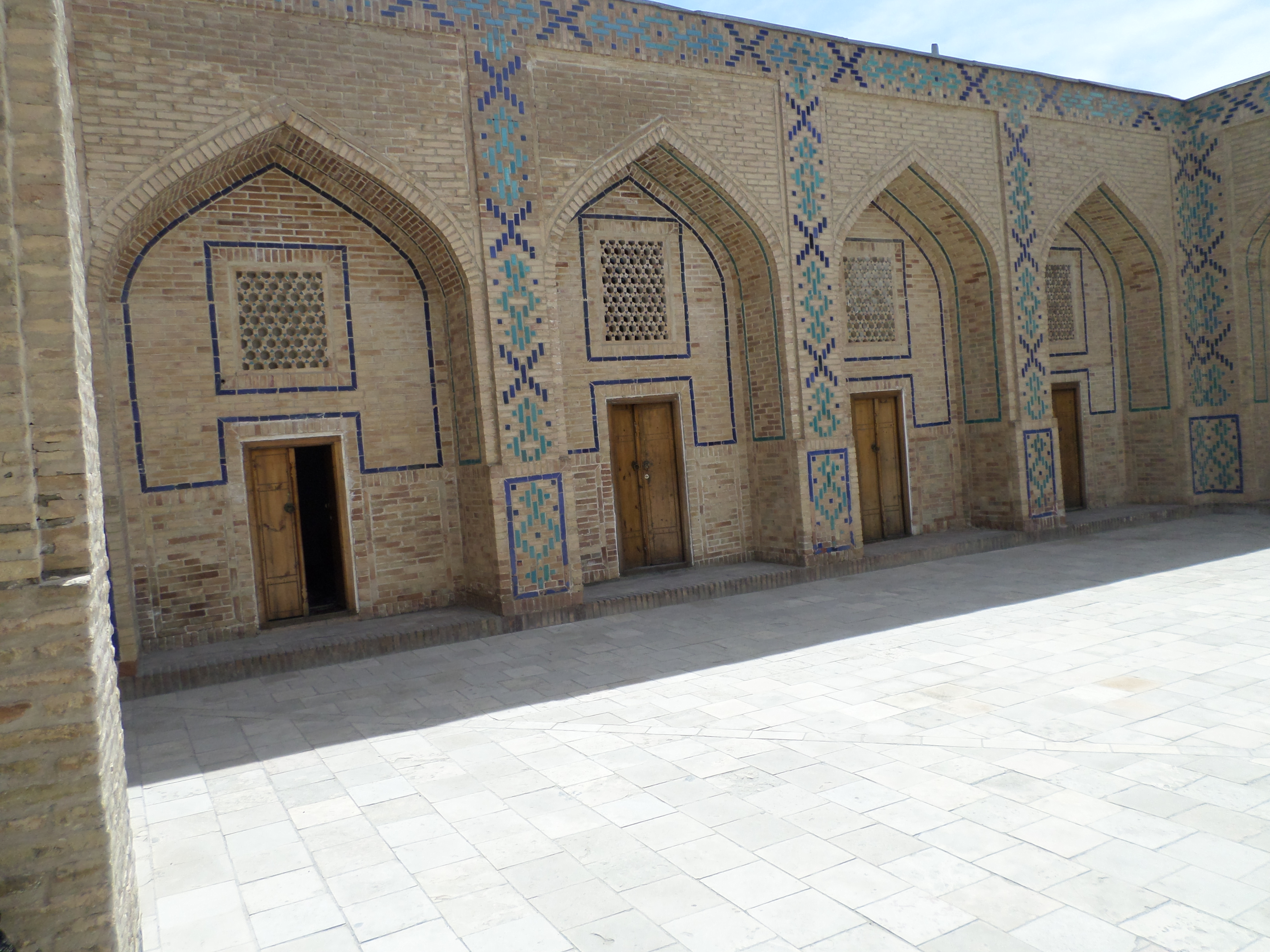
Ulugbek Madrasah

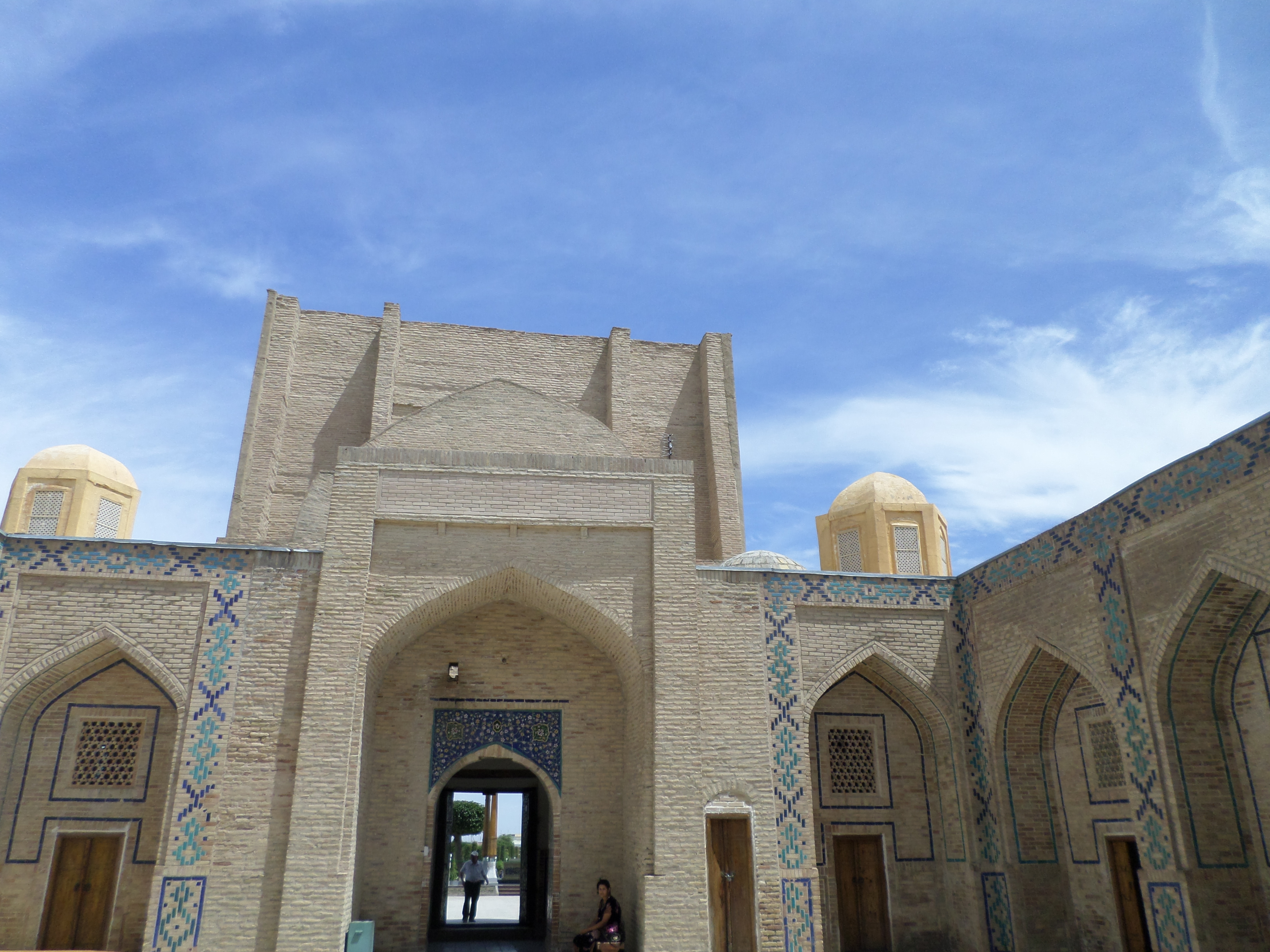
Ulugbek Madrasah

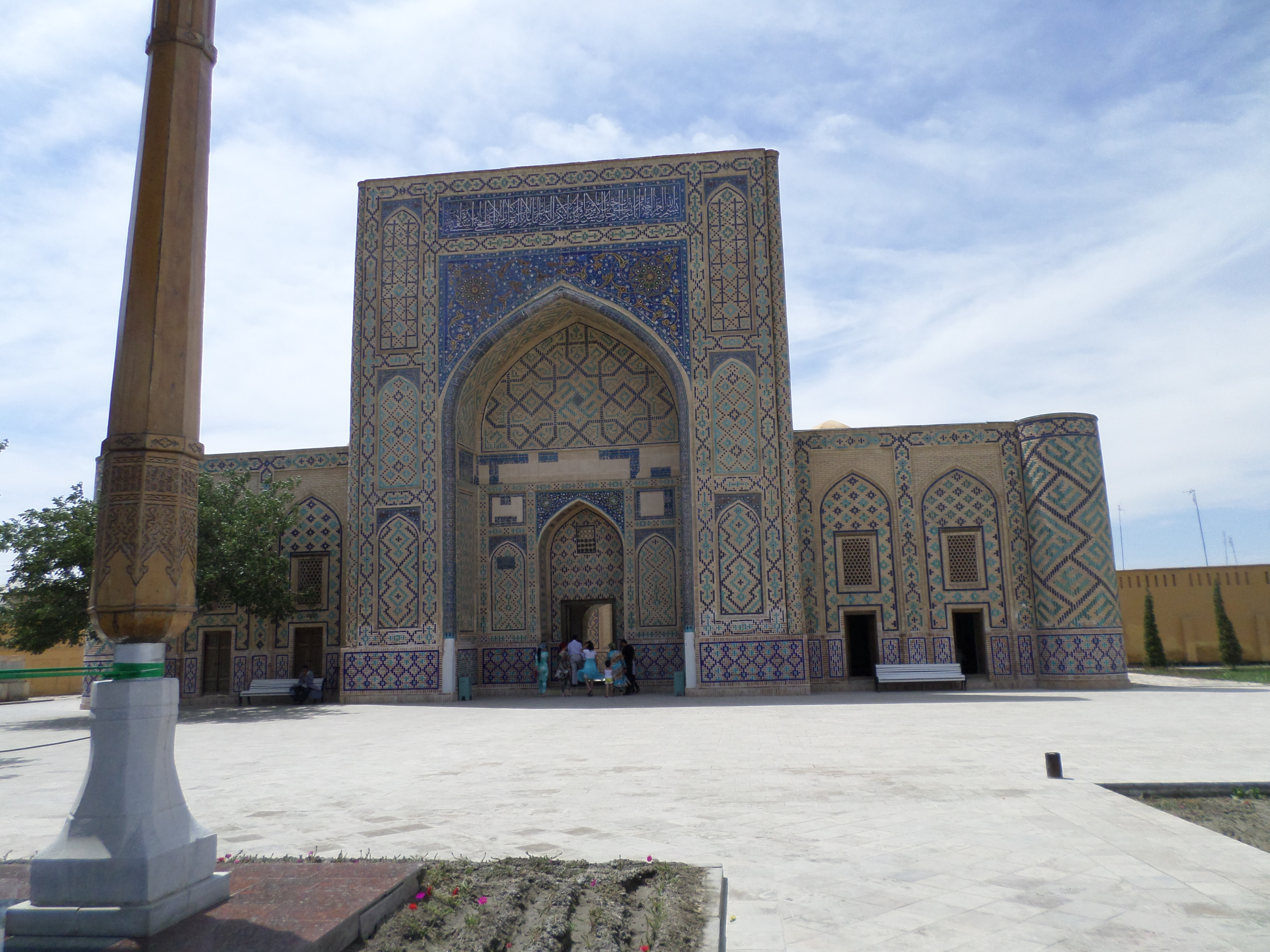
Ulugbek Madrasah

== See also ==
- Khoja Abdulkhaliq Gijduvani complex
- Ulugbek Madrasah (Bukhara)
