= Abdullakhan Madrasah (Bukhara) =

Madrasa in Bukhara, Uzbekistan

Abdullakhan madrasah
- Abdullaxon madrasasi
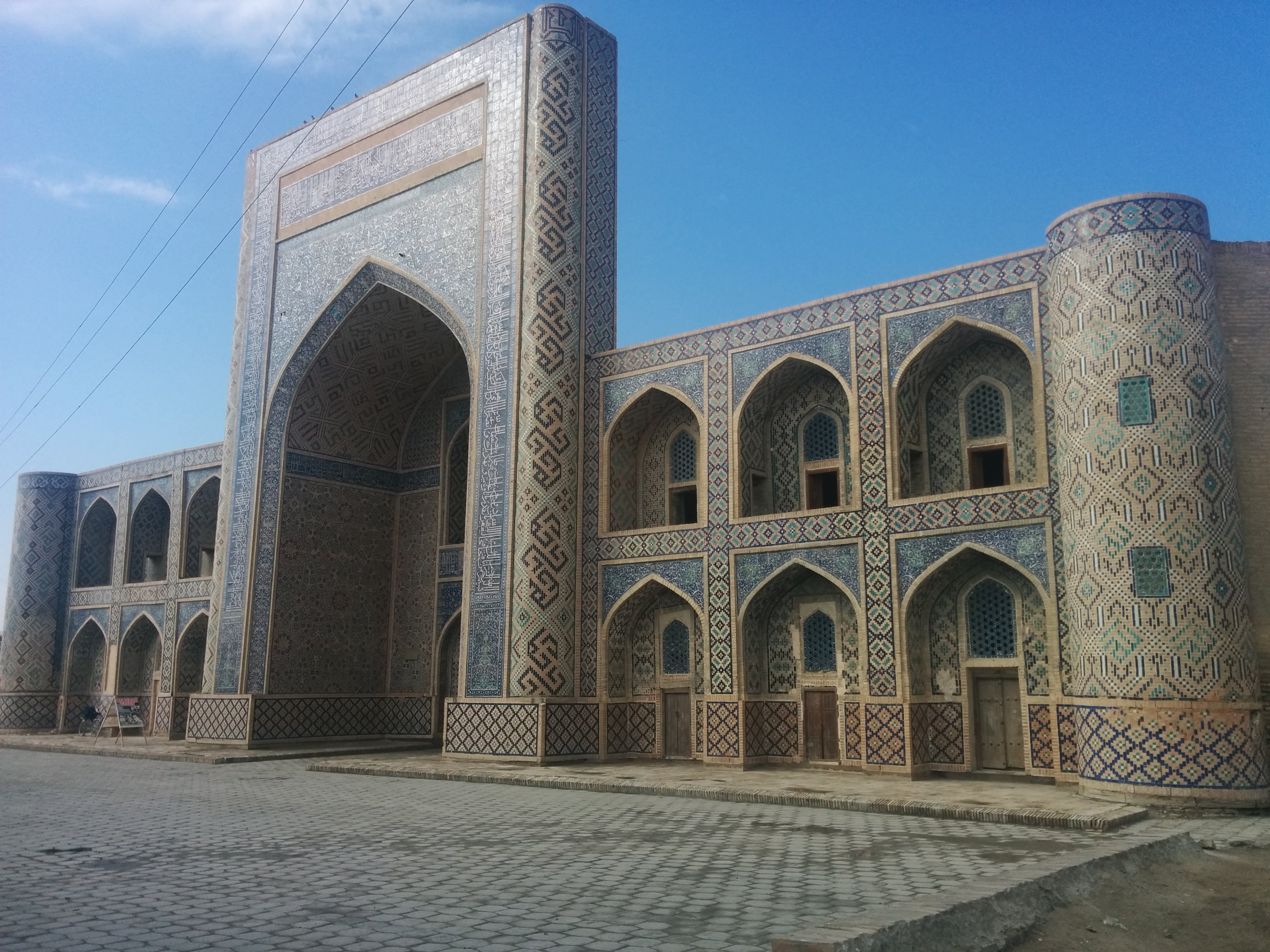
- The main facade of Abdullah Khan madrasa
- Interactive map of the Abdullakhan madrasah area

General information
- Status: State property. Cultural Heritage Department of Bukhara region on the basis of operative management right
- Type: Madrasah
- Architectural style: Central Asian architecture
- Location: Khoja Gunjariy MFY, Mirdostim street, Bukhara Region, Uzbekistan
- Coordinates: 39.7748°N 64.4049°E
- Construction started: 1588
- Construction stopped: 1590
- Owner: Abdullah Khan II

Technical details
- Material: baked bricks
- Floor count: 2 floors

Abdullakhan madrasah is an architectural monument located in the north of the Koshmadrasa ensemble in Bukhara, Uzbekistan. This madrasah, which is a perfect example of the architecture of the Uzbek ruler Abdullah II, demonstrates all the creative achievements of Bukhara architecture in the 16th century.

== History ==
The architect of the madrasah is unknown, and it was built by Abdullah II. Construction works began in 1587–1588 and ended in 1589–1590.

== Location ==
The madrasah is located in Bukhara, in the northern part of the Koshmadrasa ensemble, opposite the Modarikhan Madrasah.

This and Modarikhan madrasas form the architectural ensemble of Koshmadrasa. In the architecture of Central Asia, the term "double" is used for a paired ensemble of two buildings facing each other with facades, and "double madrasah" is used for two madrasas.

== Architecture ==
On the outside walls of the madrasah, there are large peshravs on the western and northern facades. On the southern side, which is attached to the bathhouse, which existed in this place for a certain time, the protrusion from the main wall is not noticeable.

In the mosque of Abdullah Khan madrasa, five times and Friday prayers were performed every day..

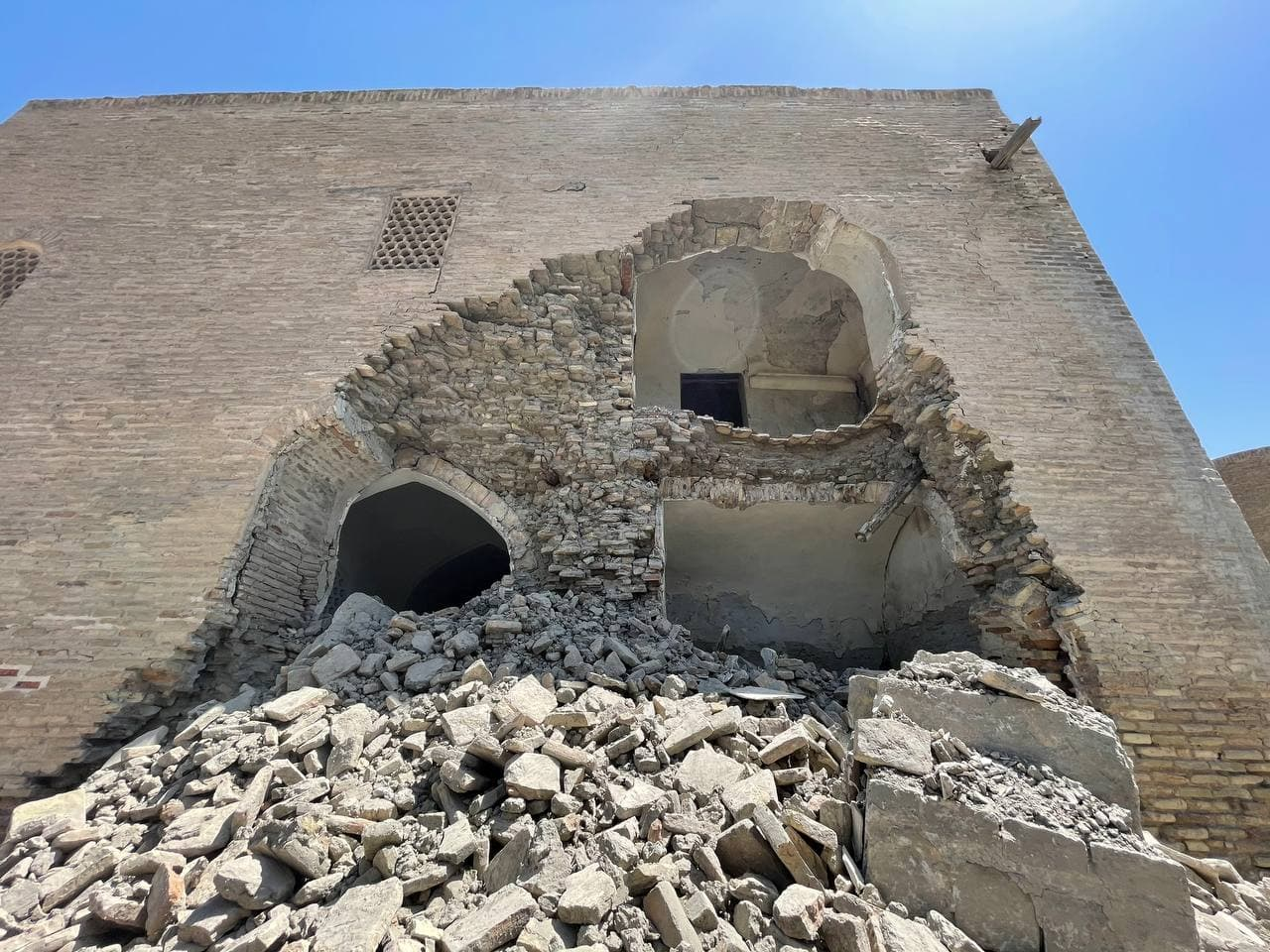
The collapsed back wall of Abdullakhan madrasa. July 29, 2021

The structure is quite different from the usual madrasas. Two-story rooms surround the courtyard. There is a gallery and a high porch on both sides. The entrances lead to the inner rooms and the living room. The large gable of the madrasah faces south. The wings and muqarnas are decorated with lacquer decorations.

Passing through the gate, one enters the large rooms on both sides – the classroom and the mosque. A unique example of the style of door jamb is made from small pieces of wood in the shape of a knot.

The composition of the courtyard is made in the "choraivon" method with high gables located in one line. In the corners of the madrasah, complex historical connections have been created, including vestibules (prayer rooms). In the western part there is a room with a wide dome. It is surrounded by two-story cells. On the second floor, it is a kind of gallery – the hallways of the rooms seem to be bent.

All exterior facades of the madrasah, except the main facade, are raised and decorated with baked bricks. In the middle of the main eastern gable there is a salable gable with a deep arch. There is a library porch above the gatehouse.

The gable of the gatehouse was once framed by a strip of wide scrolled inscriptions. Verses from the Qur'an were written on it in white letters on a white background.

== Restoration ==
Over the years, Abdullah Khan madrasah underwent extensive renovations, focusing mainly on the front of the madrasah. Large-scale restoration work was also carried out due to the 2500th anniversary of the founding of Bukhara. During the restoration work, the grounds in the center of both madrasahs were lowered. Currently, the pediments in front of the gables of the building have been removed.

== Destruction ==
On the night of July 29–30, 2021, a part of the back wall of Abdullah Khan madrasah collapsed. Officials of the Cultural Heritage Agency came and studied the situation, according to their estimates, six billion soums are required for the complete repair of the building. The Bukhara regional prosecutor's office conducted an investigation into the case and initiated a criminal case under Article 207 of the Criminal Code.

== Gallery ==
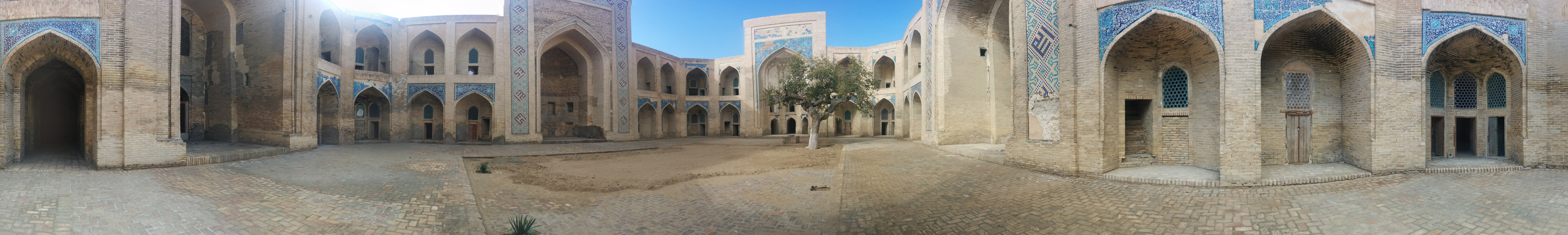
Abdullakhan Madrasah

== Literatures ==
- Pugachenkova G. A., Rempel L. I., Vidayushiyesya pamyatniki arxitekturi Oʻzbekistana, T., 1958.
- Oʻzbekiston obidalaridagi bitiklar: Buxoro. I. Toshkent: Uzbekistan Today. 2013. pp. 494–560. ISBN 978-9943-4510-5-6.
