= Khoja Abdulkhalik Gijduvani Complex =

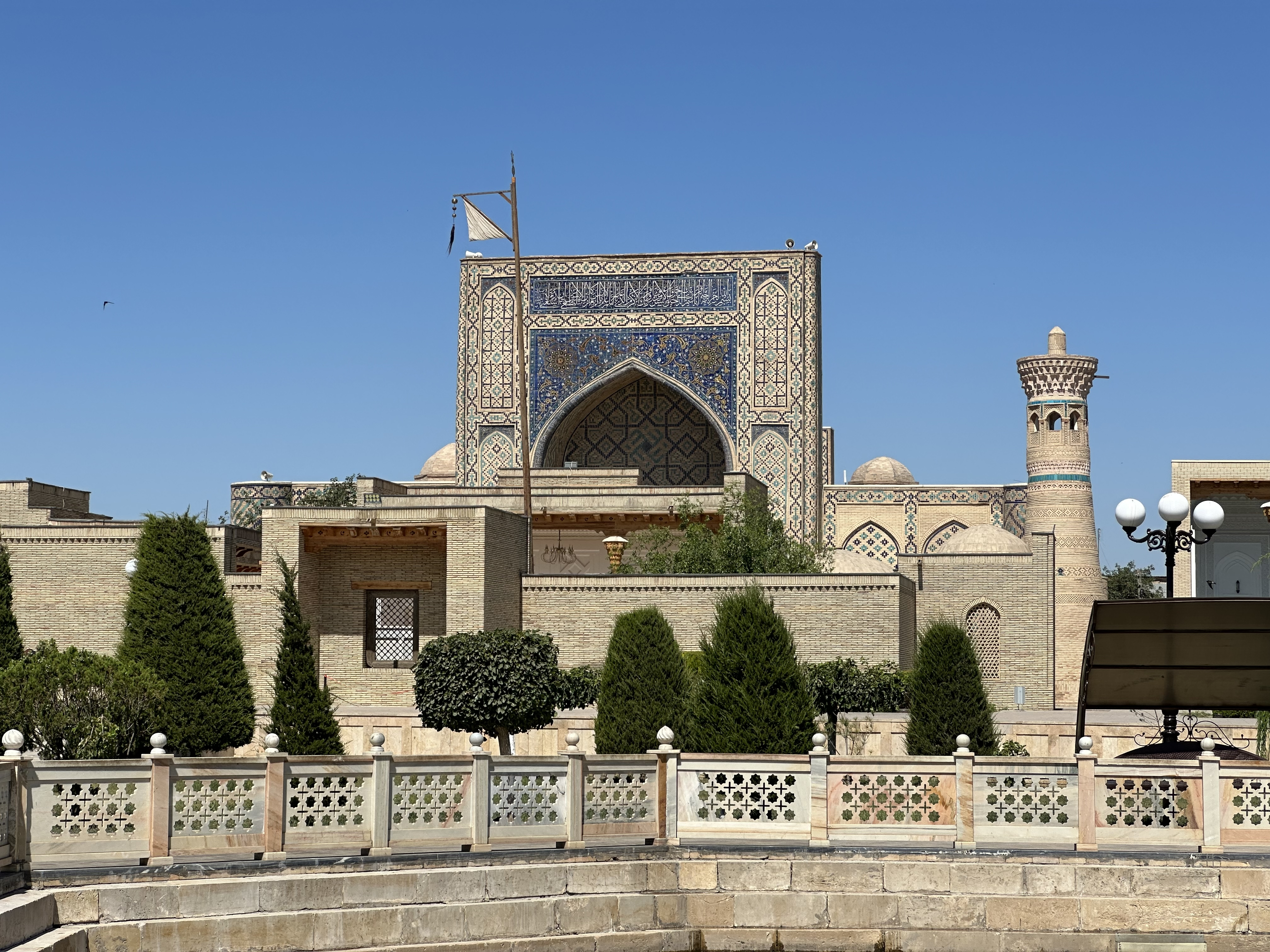
- Interactive map of the Khoja Abdulkhalik Gijduvani Complex area

General information
- Location: Gijduvan, Bukhara, Uzbekistan
- Coordinates: 40.1033°N 64.6778°E
- Year built: 12th–15th centuries

Technical details
- Material: baked brick, wood, ganch

Khoja Abdulkhalik Gijduvani Complex is an architectural monument (12th–15th centuries) in the city of Gijduvan, Bukhara Region. The complex is located 50 km from the city of Bukhara and was built by Abdukholiq ibn Abdujalil Gijduvani, the founder of the Khojagan sect. The complex consists of the mausoleum of Khoja Abdulkhaliq Gijduvani, the Ulugbek Madrasah, a mosque and a pool. Khoja Abdulkhaliq Gijduvani is the first representative of seven pirs in Bukhara. He became known as Khojai Jahan and founded the school of Sufism. In 1433, Timurid Mirza Ulugbek built a madrasa in front of the shrine of Khoja Abdulkhaliq Gijduvani. In 2003, the 900th anniversary of Khoja Abdulkhaliq Gijduvani was widely celebrated. The Ulugbek madrasah in the complex was distinguished by its appearance. A mosque was built in this complex during the reign of Shaibani Ubaydullah Khan of Bukhara (1539–1550). In 1583, the madrasa and mosque were renovated during the reign of Bukhara Khan Abdullah Khan II (1583–1598). Verses 1–7 of Surah Alaq were mentioned on the facade of the Mirzo Ulugbek madrasah. These notes were written in suls script. However, most of them have collapsed. In 1946, certain part of the Mirzo Ulugbek madrasa records were read and accordingly it was restored. The tombstone of Abdukholiq Gijduvani was made of stone and the eleventh verse of Surah "Mujodala" from the Quran was written on the sides. On the short sides of the tombstone, an epitaph (inscription devoted to that person) was written. The mosque in the complex of Khoja Abdulkhaliq Gijduvani was rebuilt in 2003. Nowadays, all the conditions for pilgrims have been created in the complex of Khoja Abdulkhaliq Gijduvani.
