= Modarikhan madrasah =

Madrasa in Bukhara, Uzbekistan

Modarikhan Madrasah
- Modarixon madrasasi
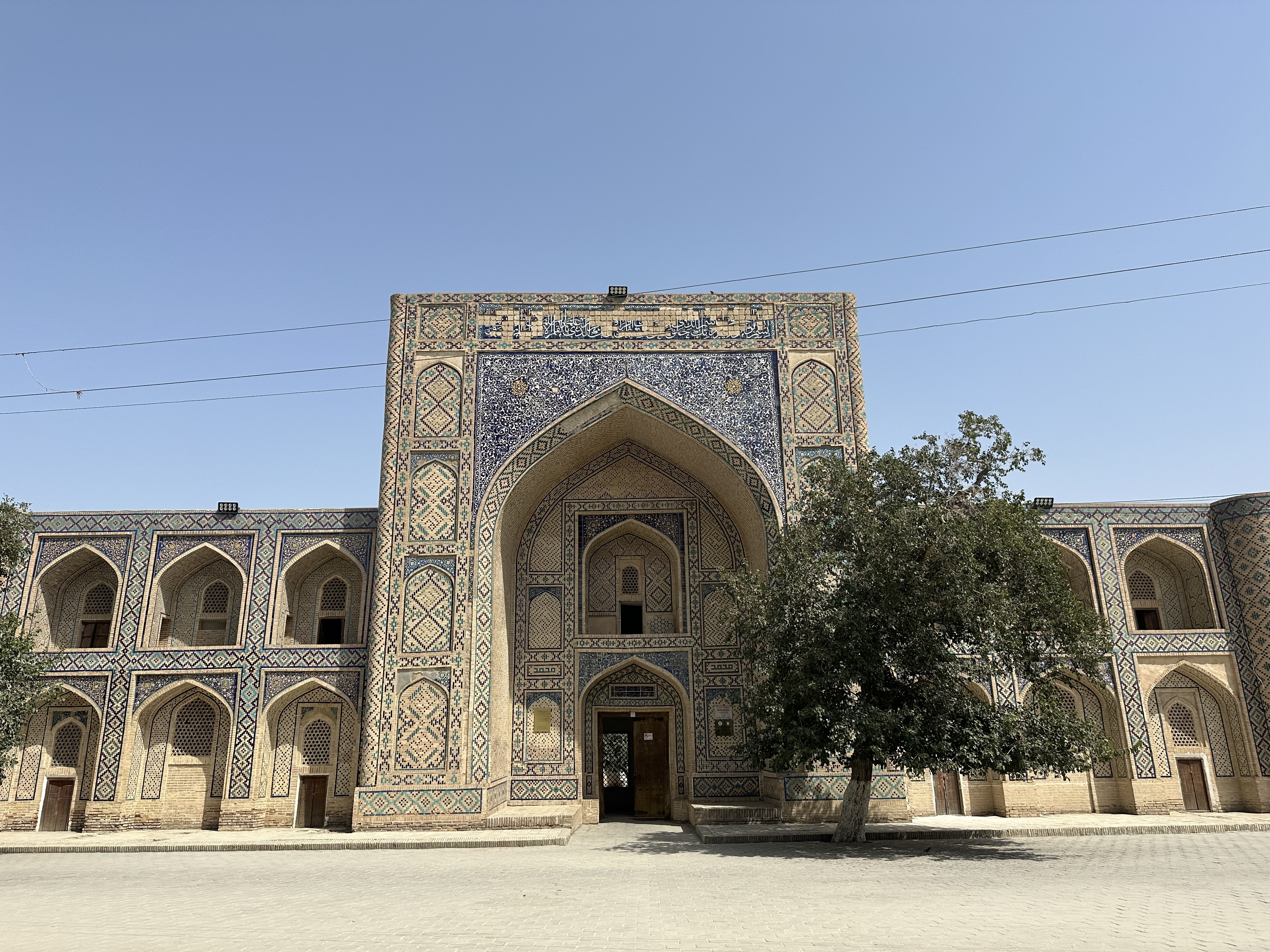
- Interactive map of the Modarikhan Madrasah area

General information
- Status: under the protection of the state
- Type: Madrasah
- Architectural style: Central Asian architecture
- Location: Xoʻja Gʻunjoriy MFY, Mirdoʻstim Street, Bukhara Region, Uzbekistan
- Coordinates: 39.77447717366°N 64.40592327683°E
- Construction started: 1566
- Construction stopped: 1567
- Owner: State property. Bukhara Region Cultural Heritage Department on the basis of operational management rights

Technical details
- Material: baked bricks

Modarikhan Madrasah is an architectural monument (1566–1567) located opposite the Abdullah Khan Madrasah in Bukhara. Both make up the Koshmadrasa complex. Abdullakhan Madrasah (Bukhara) is located opposite. Currently, it is included in the national list of real estate objects of material and cultural heritage of Uzbekistan

== History ==
Modarikhan madrasah is one of the madrasahs built in honor of Abdullah Khan II's mother. Modarikhan madrasah was built in 1566–1567. Hafiz Tanish Bukhari, one of the court historians who lived in this period, recorded in his work Abdullanoma (Persian: عبد الله نامه) that the people of Bukhara actively participated in the construction of the madrasah. The main gable of the madrasah is facing west and is decorated with flowers.

The main motifs of the Modarikhan madrasah have been preserved on the pediment. The patterns of the madrasah are mainly preserved in white, blue, blue, dark brown, and dark colors. The word "Allah" is written in Handasavi Kufic form on the upper pediment of Modarikhan madrasah. Above the gate of the madrasah there is an inscription on the tile in white letters. In this inscription, there were names of the orderer of the construction of the madrasah, Abdullah Khan II, the person who compiled the text of the book, the chief judge of Bukhara, Nuriddin Qazi Muhammad, and the date of completion.

In 1998–1999, the Modari Khan madrasah was renovated and replaced with a new book. Verses 1–5 of Surah "Alaq" from the Holy Qur'an are written on a blue background with white letters in suls script on the front of the madrasah. Above it, the word "Mulk-Allah's" is repeated in Kufic letters in yellow letters. On the right and left sides of the entrance gate of Modarikhan madrasah, the name "Muhammad" is pinned in the Kufic form. As a result of the earthquakes, the books of the Modarikhan Madrasah were damaged. The inscription above the madrasah gate is the only surviving epigraphic inscription. Makur Kitaba inscription is written in tile style with white letters on a dark blue background. But this book has also been partially restored on the basis of archival photographs of 1998.

== Literature ==
- Ражабов, Қ.; Иноятов, С. (2016). Бухоро тарихи [History of Bukhara] (in Uzbek). Tashkent: Тафаккур нашриёти. ISBN 978-9943-24-119-0.
- Абдухолиқов, Ф; Ртвиладзе, Э; Раззоқов, А; Раҳимов, К; Ҳакимов, А; Абдуҳалимов, Б; Мансуров, А; Маннонов, А; Муҳамедов, Н (2016). Ўзбекистон обидаларидаги битиклар: Бухоро [Inscriptions in the monuments of Uzbekistan: Bukhara] (in Uzbek). Tashkent: Uzbekistan Today. ISBN 978-9943-4510-5-6.
