= Rubaiyat =

Rubaiyat or Ruba'iyat or Rubayat may refer to:

== Literature ==
- Ruba'iyat, a collection of ruba'i, Persian-language poems having four lines (i.e. quatrains)
- Rubaiyat of Omar Khayyam or simply Rubaiyat, the title given by Edward Fitzgerald to his translations into English of ruba'i by Omar Khayyam
- "Reginald's Rubaiyat", a short story in the collection Reginald (1904) by Saki

== Music ==
- Rubáiyát: Elektra's 40th Anniversary, a 1990 compilation album released by Elektra Records
- The Rubaiyat of Dorothy Ashby, a 1970 album by jazz harpist Dorothy Ashby

== Other uses ==
- Rubayat, Iran, a village in South Khorasan Province
