= Hafiz Tanish =

16th-century Central Asian court historian and poet

Hafiz Tanish حافظ تنیش
- Born: c. 1549; Bukhara, Khanate of Bukhara
- Died: after 1598

Hafiz Tanish ibn Mir Muhammad Bukhari (Persian: حافظ تنیش بن میرمحمد بخاری; c. 1549–after 1598) was a Bukharan historian and poet in the court of Abdullah Khan II (r. 1583–1598). He is best known as the author of Sharaf-nama-yi Shahi, a Persian-language historiography and official biography of Abdullah Khan II.

The Sharaf-nama-yi Shahi, also known as the Abdullah-nameh, was described by historian Yuri Bregel as "one of the major works of Central Asian historiography and the most important historical source for the S̲h̲aybānī period."

== Sources ==
- McChesney, Robert D. (2012). Melville, Charles (ed.). Persian Historiography: A History of Persian Literature. Vol. X. London: I.B. Tauris. pp. 503–530. ISBN 978-1845119119.
