= Som (currency) =

Currency used in Central Asia

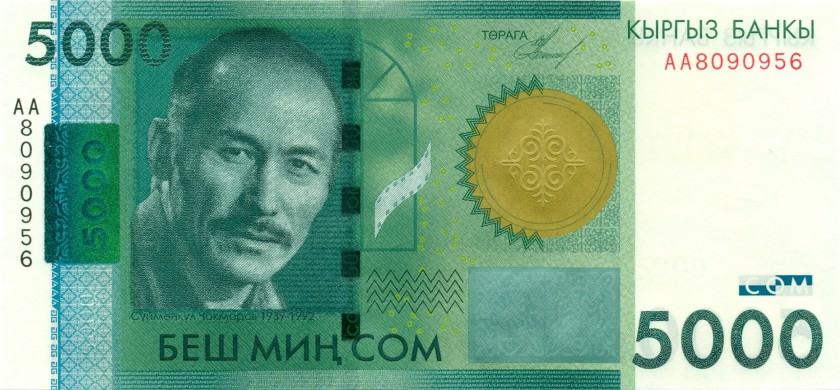
5000 kyrgyz som

The som, sum, or soum is a unit of currency used in Turkic-speaking countries in Central Asia. Its name comes from words in the respective languages (including Kazakh, Kyrgyz, Uyghur and Uzbek) for "pure", referring to historical coins of pure gold. It may refer to:

- Kyrgyz som
- Uzbekistani sum

Speakers of Kazakh, Kyrgyz and Uzbek in the then Soviet Union called the ruble by these names, and were accommodated by the word appearing on the backs of banknotes. The som of Kyrgyzstan and som of Uzbekistan are post-Soviet examples.

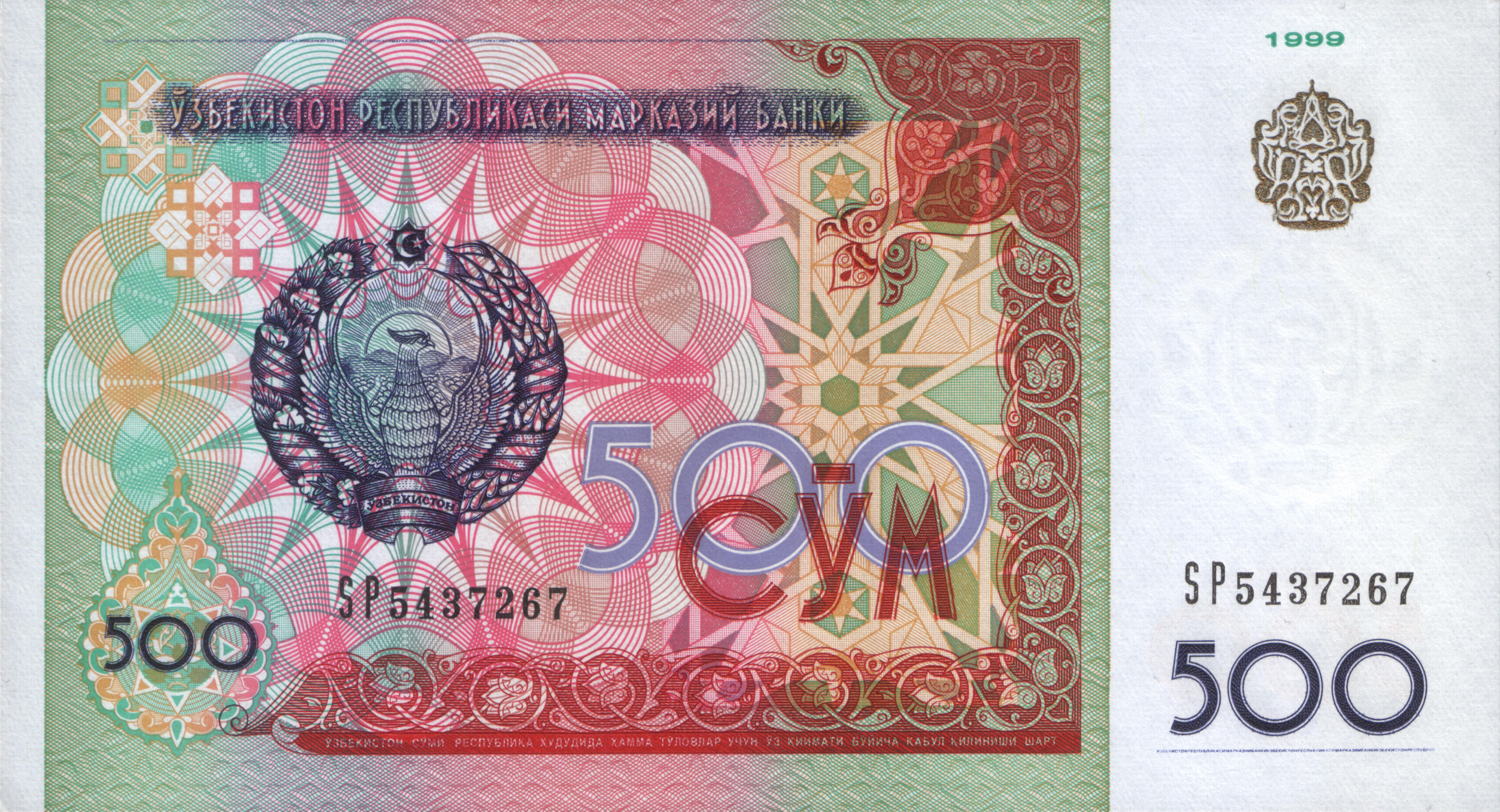
500 uzbek som

== In the Golden Horde ==
In the 14th century the Golden Horde som called silver bullion navicular shape, weighing 204.8 g (in Russian numismatic literature, they are also called Tatar hryvnya). In treasures, archeologists find them together with silver dirhams. Florentine Francesco Pegolotti wrote that the mint in Azak could stamp a bar in the "walking" coin.
