= Shaybanids =

Dynasty of Turco-Mongol origin in Central Asia

Shaybanids Abu'l-Khayrids
- The trellis-walled yurt of Muhammad Shaybani Khan.
- Parent family: Borjigin
- Country: Uzbek Khanate; Khanate of Sibir; Khanate of Bukhara; Khanate of Khiva
- Current region: Southern Russia; Middle Asia
- Origin: Golden Horde
- Founded: c. 1428
- Founder: Abu'l-Khayr Khan
- Final ruler: Pir Muhammad Khan
- Titles: Khan
- Traditions: Sunni Islam
- Dissolution: c. 1599

The Shibanids or Shaybanids, (Note: Uzbek: Шайбонийлар, romanized: Shayboniylar, arabized: شەيبانىيلەر; Classical Persian: شیبانیان, romanized: Shaybāniyān, cyrillized: Шайбониён; Kazakh: Шайбанилар, romanized: Şaibanilar, arabized: شايبانيلار) more accurately known as the Abu'l-Khayrid Shibanids or simply the Abu'l-Khayrids, were a dynasty of Uzbek origin who ruled over the Khanate of Bukhara (from 1505 to 1598), the Khanate of Khwarazm (Khiva) (from 1511 to 1695), and the Khanate of Sibir (from 1563 until 1598). Their territory included most of modern-day Kazakhstan, Uzbekistan, and parts of Russia (including West Siberia) in the 15-16th century (1428-1599). They were succeeded by the Janid dynasty (1599 to 1785).

They were the patrilineal descendants of Shiban, the fifth son of Jochi and grandson of Genghis Khan. Until the mid-14th century, they acknowledged the authority of the descendants of Shiban's brothers Batu Khan and Orda Khan, such as Öz Beg Khan. The Shaybanids originally led the Grey Horde southeast of the Urals (also known as the Uzbegs, after the Uzbeks), and converted to Islam in 1282. At its height, the Khanate included parts of modern-day Afghanistan and other parts of Central Asia.

As the lineages of Batu and Orda died out in the course of the great civil wars of the 14th century, the Shaybanids under Abu'l-Khayr Khan declared themselves the only legitimate successors to Jochi and put forward claims to the whole of his enormous ulus, which included parts of Siberia and Kazakhstan. Their rivals were the Tukay-Timurid dynasty, which claimed descent from Jochi's thirteenth son by a concubine. Several decades of strife left the Tuqay-Timurids in control of the Great Horde and its successor states in Europe, namely the Khanates of Kazan, Astrakhan, and Crimea.

== Shaybanid dynasty ==
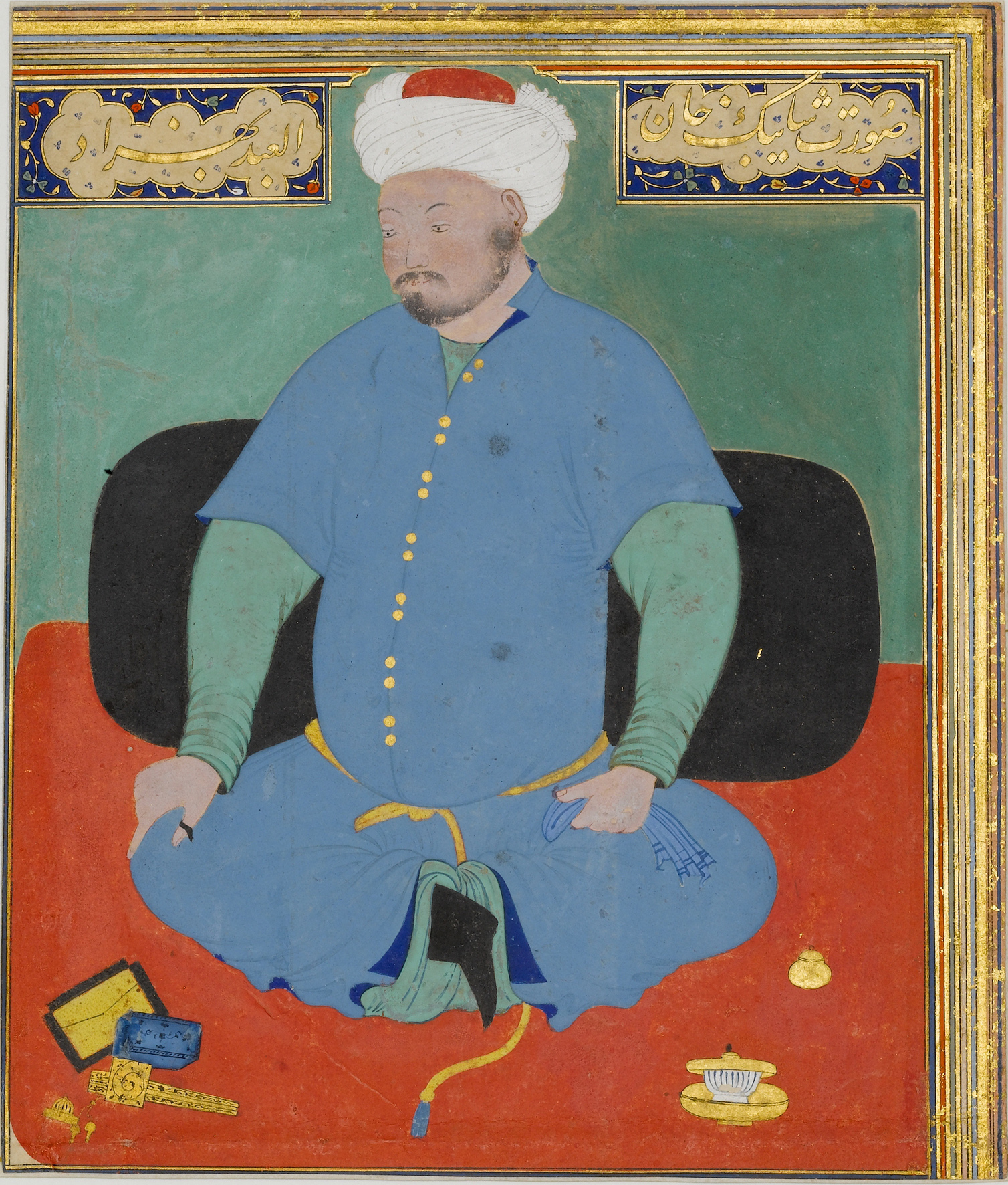
Muhammad Shaybani.

Under Abu'l-Khayr Khan (who led the Shaybanids from 1428 to 1468), the dynasty began consolidating disparate Ozbeg (Uzbek) tribes, first in the area around Tyumen and the Tura River and then down into the Syr Darya region. His grandson Muhammad Shaybani (ruled 1500–10), who gave his name to the Shaybanid dynasty, conquered Samarkand, Herat, Balkh and Bukhara, thus ending the Timurid dynasty and establishing the short-lived Shaybanid Empire. After his death at the hands of Shah Ismail I, he was followed successively by an uncle, a cousin, and a brother, whose Shaybanid descendants would rule the Khanate of Bukhara from 1505 until 1598 and the Khanate of Khwarazm (Khiva) from 1511 until 1695.

Another state ruled by the Shaybanids was the Khanate of Sibir, seizing the throne in 1563. Its last khan, Kuchum, was deposed by the Russians in 1598. He escaped to Bukhara, but his sons and grandsons were taken by the Tsar to Moscow, where they eventually assumed the surname of Sibirsky.

== Culture ==
Muhammad Shaybani Khan, and his successors, started a program of translating of Persian literature into Chagatai-Turkish. Despite this, the main bureaucratic language continued to be Persian. Over time, they underwent Karlukification of culture and heritage; by the 17th century, most Shaybanid Uzbeks and their descendant khanates were entirely assimilated to Karluk frameworks and reconciled with the Timurid dynasty in India by proclaiming themselves heirs and protectors of Timurid heritages, effectively nullified the original Kipchak root of the Uzbeks into a heavily Chagatai Karluk one.

== Numismatics ==
The Timurid ruler Shah Rukh developed the unit of currency, the tanka-i shahrukhi, in the early fifteenth century. This served as the basis for the silver coins used by the Shaybänids. The broad, thin variant of Shaybänid silver coins, which were popular throughout central Asia, Persia, and north-west India in the sixteenth century, were all created under late Tīmūrid governors. Most of these coins are between 1.1 and 1.2 in. across, with a diameter of at least one inch. Many of Abdullah II's coins have a diameter of almost 1.4 in. at their widest point, with corresponding decreases in thickness.

== Shaybanid architecture ==
As the Shaybanids set out to make Bukhara the cultural and architectural capital of their dynasty, countless building ventures transformed the city under their rule. Bukhara’s grand mosque, the Kalan Mosque, was built in 1121 C.E. However, under the Shaybanids in the early 16th century, it was entirely reconstructed with the addition of stone columns, arches, and 288 vaults. The mosque was part of a religious complex that also consisted of a five-domed palace and a mosque.

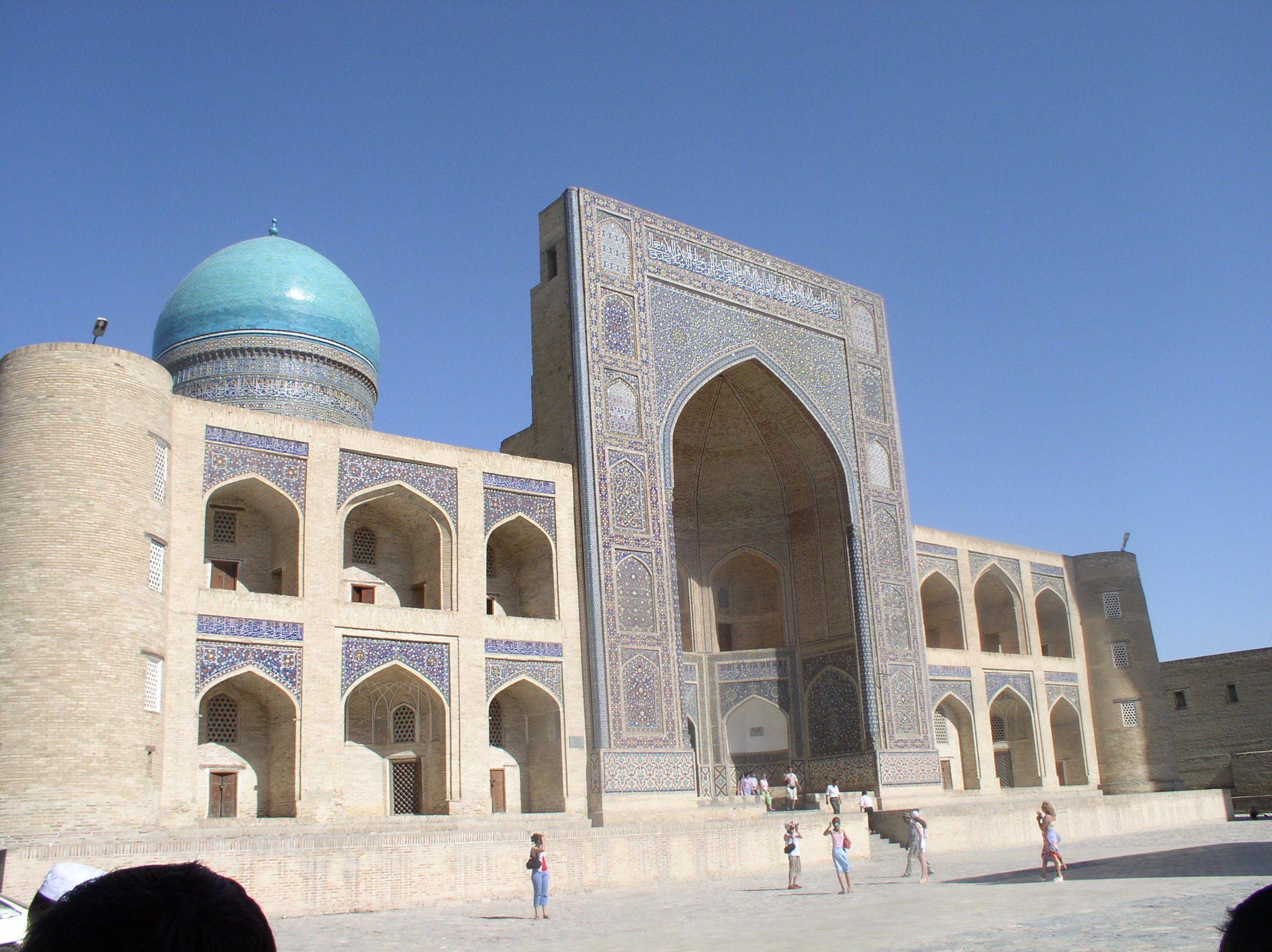
The Mir Arab Madrasa built in 1536 under Ubaidullah Khan.

In 1530, under the rule of Ubaidullah Khan, the Mir Arab Madrasa was added to the complex, in honor of a Sheikh known as Mir Arab. Opposite the Kalan Mosque, the Mir Arab Madrasa stood tall with two-story classrooms surrounding a central courtyard. The interior of much of the complex was decorated with plaster-carved ceilings and extensive colorful tilework. However, much of the tilework and wall inscriptions have not survived. In the second part of the 16th century, a north-south major roadway and an east-west passage were built throughout the city of Bukhara. In the years between 1562 and 1587, the north-south artery of the city housed the Charsu market development, which included three covered markets: The Goldsmiths’ Dome, the Hatsellers’ Dome, and the Moneychangers’ Dome. These markets, called taks for their multiple domes, were all less than 500m away from each other. Moreover, all around these covered markets were caravanserais and large madrasas that accommodated hundreds of people and students. Together, this created a lively central environment that supported the trade of an abundance of goods.

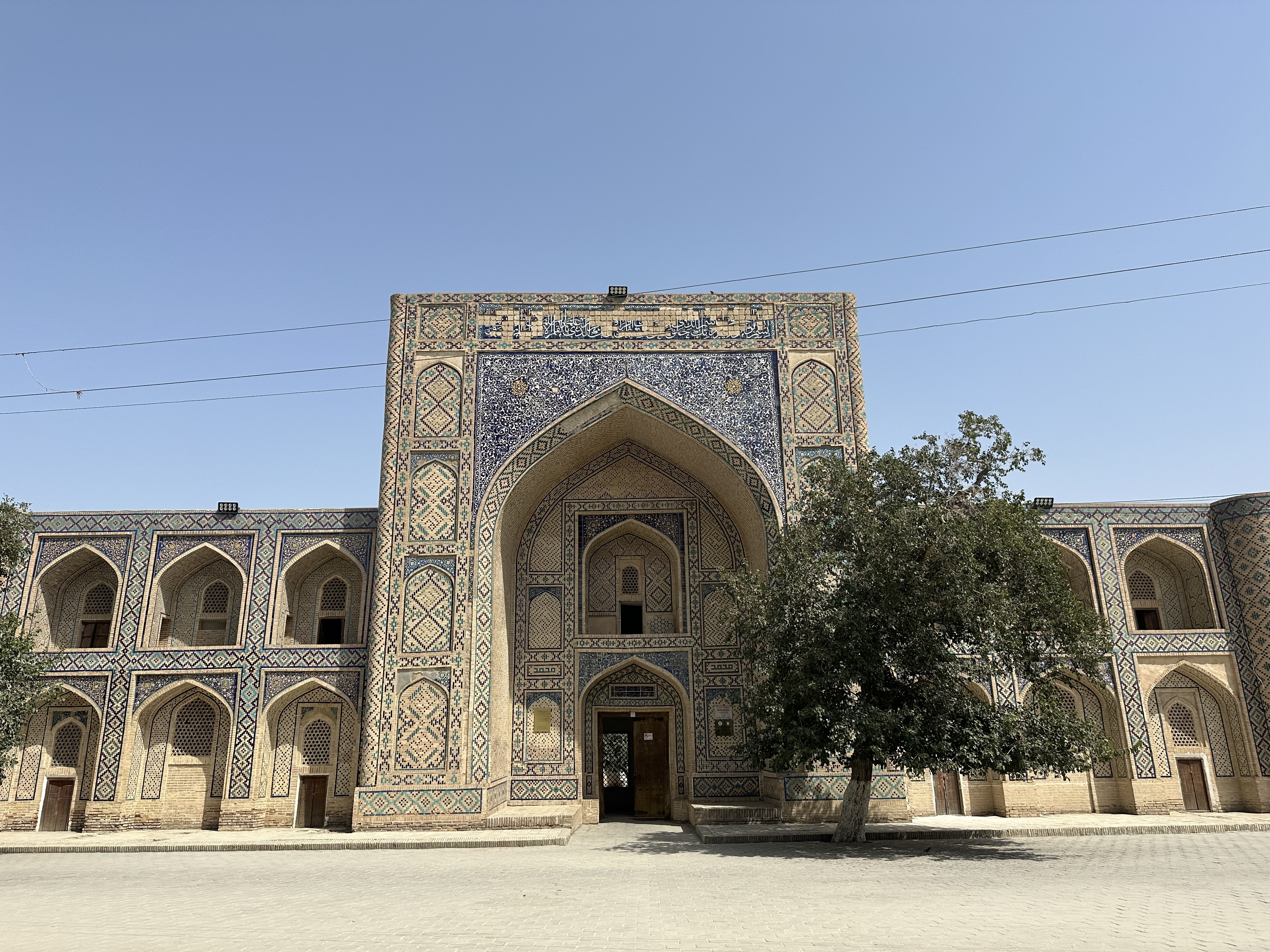
The Modari Khan Madrasa, built in 1567

In the late 16th century, during his reign as khan, Abdullah bin Iskander built two major structures, the Mohair Khan Madrasa and the Abdullah II Madrasa, together called the Kosh Madrasa. The Modari Khan Madrasa, a tribute to Abdullah ll’s mother, was built first, in 1567. Then, between 1588 and 1590, Abdullah Khan ll built another madrasa, the Abdullah ll Madrasa in his own honour. The decoration of the Abdullah Khan Madrasa consists of a complex glazed tile pattern with geometric stars, shapes, and borders. The madrasa also features various inscriptions containing the name of the ruler. The inscriptions were written in Arabic script with extended vertical lines. The large madrasa was built to serve as a theological school.

Another of the most significant monuments built by Abdullah Khan (1557–98 C.E.) was the Sarrafan Baths. The Sarrafan Baths consisted of a central octagonal bath with rooms on all sides. The different rooms were multi-purpose, allowing for a range of activities from simple relaxation to business meetings, conversation, and games. There are differences between the layout of the men’s and women’s bath quarters. Men had separate rooms for worship and the rooms were intricately decorated with tile work. The women’s bath was less decorated and lacked any separate stalls.

== Khans of Shaybanid dynasty of Khanate of Bukhara ==
Titular Name	Personal Name	Reign
They were the descendants of Shiban, fifth son of Jochi ruling in Western Siberia. Later a major faction split and made a dash for Transoxiana and adopted the name Uzbek (Ozbeg) after their famous Khan, Uzbeg Khan. The faction that remained behind in Siberia created the Khanate of Sibir and lasted until the 16th century.
Khan خان	**Abu'l-Khayr Khan ibn Dawlat Shaykh ibn Ibrahim Khan** ابو الخیر خان ابن دولت شیخ ابن ابراهیم خان	1428 – 1468 C.E.
Khan خان; Shaykh Hayder -	**Shah Budagh Khan ibn Abu'l-Khayr Khan** شاه بداغ خان ابن ابو الخیر خان	1468 C.E.
Khan خان; Abu'l-Fath ابو الفتح	**Muhammad Shayabak Khan ibn Shah Budagh Khan ibn Abu'l-Khayr Khan** محمد شایبک خان ابن شاہ بداغ خان ابن ابو الخیر خان	1500 – 1510 C.E.
Khan خان	Kochkunju Muhammad bin Abu'l-Khayr Khan کچھکنجو محمد بن ابو الخیر خان	1512 – 1531 C.E.
Khan خان; Muzaffar-al-Din مظفر الدین	Abu Sa'id bin Kochkunju ابو سعید بن کچھکنجو	1531 – 1534 C.E.
Khan خان; Abu'l-Ghazi ابو الغازی	Ubaydullah bin Mahmud bin Shah Budagh عبید الله بن محمود بن شاه بداغ	1534 – 1539 C.E.
Khan خان	Abdullah bin Kochkunju عبد الله بن کچھکنجو	1539 – 1540 C.E.
Khan خان	Abdal-Latif bin Kochkunju عبد اللطیف بن کچھکنجو	1540 – 1552 C.E.
Khan خان	Nawruz Ahmed bin Sunjuq bin Abu'l-Khayr Khan نوروز احمد بن سنجق بن ابو الخیر خان	1552 – 1556 C.E.
Khan خان	Pir Muhammad Khan bin Jani Beg پیر محمد خان بن جانی بیگ	1556 – 1561 C.E.
Khan خان	Iskander bin Jani Beg اسکندر بن جانی بیگ	1561 – 1583 C.E.
Khan خان; Buzurg Khan بزرگ خان; Abdullah Khan Uzbek عبد الله خان ازبک	**Abdullah Khan bin Iskander** عبد الله خان بن اسکندر	1583 – 1598 C.E.
Khan خان	Abdul-Mo'min bin Abdullah Khan عبد المومن بن عبد الله خان	1598 C.E.
Khan خان	Pir Muhammad Khan bin Sulayman Khan bin Jani Beg پیر محمد خان بن سلیمان خان بن جانی بیگ	1598 – 1599 C.E.
Khanate of Bukhara taken over by a new dynasty called the Janids also known as Toqay-Temurids or Ashtarkhanids (descendants of Khans of Astrakhan).

  - Blue Row Signifies progenitor chief.
    - Khans of significance highlighted in Bold.

== Genealogy ==
House of Borjigin

Mongol Empire
Golden Horde (Before Islamization)
Golden Horde (After Islamization)
Uzbek Khanate
Bukhara Khanate
Balkh Khanate
Khiva Khanate

Temüjin r. 1206–1227
Jochi r. 1225–1227
Shayban
Bahadur
Jochi-Buqa
Bada-Qul	Bada-Qul
Ming-Timur	Timur-Khwaja
Khayr-Pulad r. 1361–1367 r. 1362–1364	Tuy-Khwaja
Ibrahim	Arab-Shah r. 1374–1380 r. 1377–1380	Tokhtamysh
Dawlat-Shaykh r. 1423–1425	Tughluq-Hajji	Karim-Berdi r. 1460– r. 1457–1462
Abu'l-Khayr r. 1428–1428 r. 1428–1468	Timur-Shaykh
Shah-Budaq	Shaykh-Haydar r. 1468–1471	Kuchkunchi r. 1512–1530	Suyunch	Khwaja-Muhammad	Yadigar r. 1468–1468
Shaybani r. 1501–1510	Mahmud-Shah	Abu Sa'id r. 1530–1533	Abdullah I r. 1539–1540	Abdul-Latif r. 1540–1552	Nawruz-Ahmad r. 1552–1556	Jani-Beg	Bubay	Barka	Abulaq	Aminaq
Ubaydullah I r. 1533–1539	Kistan-Qara r. 1526–1544	Pir-Muhammad I r. 1545–1567 r. 1556–1561	Iskandar I r. 1561–1583 r. 1573–1582	Sulayman	Kibak	Ilbars I r. 1511–1518	Balbars	Hasan-Quli r. 1519–1524	Sufiyan r. 1524–1535	Buchugha r. 1535–1535	Awanish r. 1535–1538	Qal r. 1540–1547	Aqatay r. 1547–1556
Abdul-Aziz; Hakim r. 1538–1540	Qilich-Qara r. 1544–1545	Din-Muhammad r. 1567–1573	Abdullah II r. 1583–1598 r. 1594–1598	Ibadullah	Pir-Muhammad II r. 1599–1599	Muhammad-Ibrahim r. 1601–1601	Sultan-Hajji r. 1518–1519	Yunus r. 1556–1557	Dust-Muhammad r. 1557–1558	Din-Muhammad r. 1540–1540	Hajji-Muhammad r. 1558–1594, 1598 – 1602
Abdul-Mu'min r. 1582–1599 r. 1598–1599	Abdul-Amin r. 1599–1601	Arab-Muhammad r. 1602–1621
Jochi r. 1695–1697	Wali r. 1697–1698	Habash r. 1621–1623	Ilbars II r. 1621–1623	Isfandiyar I r. 1623–1643	Abu'l-Ghazi I r. 1643–1664
Shah-Niyaz r. 1698–1702	Musa r. 1703–1704	Anush-Muhammad r. 1664–1686
Shah-Bakht r. 1702–1703	Sayyid-Ali r. 1703–1703	Ilbars III r. 1728–1740	Shah-Timur r. 1721–1736	Khudaydad r. 1686–1689	Muhammad-Arang r. 1689–1695	Yadigar I r. 1704–1714
Abu'l-Ghazi II r. 1742–1747	Safar	Ubaydullah III r. 1751–1754
Shah-Ghazi r. 1764–1767	Pulad-Ghazi r. 1781–1783

== Sources ==
- Asanova, Galina; Dow, Martin (2001). "The Ṣarrāfān Baths in Bukhara". Iran. 39: 191. doi:10.2307/4300604. JSTOR 4300604.
- Bartold, Vasily (1964) The Shaybanids. Collected Works, vol. 2, part 2. Moscow, 1964.
- Bregel, Yuri (2009). "ABU'L-KHAYRIDS". Encyclopædia Iranica.
- Green, Nile (2019). "Introduction: The Frontiers of the Persianate World (ca.800 - 1900)". In Green, Nile (ed.). The Persianate World: The Frontiers of a Eurasian Lingua Franca. University of California Press.34
- Grousset, Rene (1970). The Empire of the Steppes. Translated by Walford, Naomi. Rutgers University Press. ISBN 0-8135-0627-1.
- Kilic-Schubel, N. (2016). "Shibanid Empire". In Dalziel, N.; MacKenzie, J.M. (eds.). The Encyclopedia of Empire.
- Lowick, N. M. (1966). "Shaybanid Silver Coins". The Numismatic Chronicle. Seventh Series. 6: 251–330.
- McChesney, R.D. (1986). "Shibanids". In Bosworth, C. E.; Van Donzel, E.; Heinrichs, W. P.; Lecomte, G. (eds.). The Encyclopaedia of Islam. Vol. IX. Brill.
- McChesney, R.D. (2021). Four Central Asian Shrines.
- Bosworth, C.E. (1996) The new Islamic dynasties: a chronological and genealogical manual Columbia University Press, New York, pp. 288–9, ISBN 0-231-10714-5
- Semenov, Yuri (1963). Siberia: Its Conquest and Development. Hollis and Carter. p. 75.
- Soucek, Svat (2000). A History of Inner Asia. Cambridge University Press.
- Soucek, Svatopluk (2000) A History of Inner Asia Cambridge University Press, Cambridge, pp. 149–157, ISBN 0-521-65169-7
- Erkinov A. “The Poetry of the Nomads and Shaybani Rulers of Transition to a Settled Society”. In: Central Asia on Display: Proceedings of the VII. Conference of the European Society for Central Asian Studies (27–30 September 2000). G.Rasuly-Paleczek, J. Katsching (eds). Vienna, 2005. P.145-150.
