= Abdullah Khan II =

Khan of Bukhara from 1583 to 1598

- Khan-i Buzurg (The Great Khan)
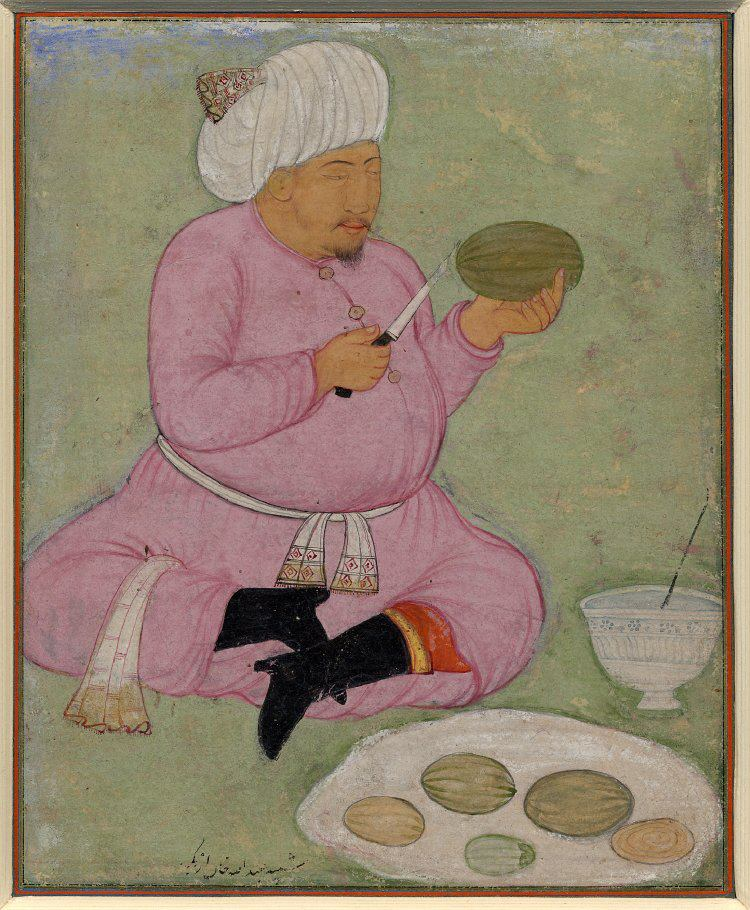
- Abdullah Khan Uzbek II slicing melons. Created in Bukhara, c. 1590

Khan of the Bukhara Khanate
- Reign: 1583–1598
- Coronation: 1583
- Predecessor: Iskander bin Jani Beg
- Successor: Abdul-Mo'min bin Abdullah Khan
- Born: 1533
- Died: 1598 (aged 64–65)
Names
- Abdullah Khan bin Iskandar
- Uzbek: عبد اللہ خان بن اسکندر
- House: Borjigin
- Dynasty: Shaybanids
- Religion: Sunni Islam

Abdullah Khan (Chagatai and Persian: عبدالله خان; 1533/4–1598), known as "Khan-i Buzurg" (خان بزرگ) "The Great Khan" was an Uzbek ruler of the Khanate of Bukhara (1500–1785). He was the last uncontested Shaybanid Khan of Bukhara from 1583 until his death.

Abdullah Khan initiated a war with Iran which lasted from 1587 to 1598. He was able to focus on this thanks to a non-aggression pact with the Mughal Emperor, Akbar, through which Abdullah Khan recognized Akbar's right to rule in the territory of Kabul.

During the reign of Abdullah Khan, Bukhara was also diplomatically hostile to the Khan of Yarkent, Abdul Karim Khan.

== Biography ==
Abdullah Khan was born in 1533 or 1534 in Afarinkent, located on an island between the two arms of the Zarafshan River.

=== The ascent to the throne ===
After the death of Abdulaziz Shaybanid there was a struggle for the throne. Khan Abdullatif, who ruled Samarkand, sought to rule Bukhara through his two grandchildren: Shaibani Khan Yar Muhammad Sultan and Burhan-Sultan.

However, after the death of Abdullatif Khan in 1551, Barak Khan, who ruled Tashkent, took Samarkand and established himself as ruler there under the name of Newroz Ahmed Khan. He was declared the supreme khan of the Uzbeks. Shaybanid Abdullah Sultan, who was then governor of Kermine, led the resistance against Newroz Ahmed Khan. He was assisted by his uncle, the governor of Balkh, Pir Muhammad Khan. In 1556 Newroz Ahmad died. With his death, Pir Muhammad Khan was proclaimed the supreme ruler of the Uzbeks.

=== The struggle for the unification of the state ===
In 1557, Abdullah Sultan captured Bukhara with the support of Sufi sheikhs and became its ruler. In 1561, he was bold enough to proclaim his father Iskander as supreme khan of the Uzbeks. He had previously ruled Kermine and Miankal. Abdullah's father was more interested in religious rites, so he entrusted the conduct of state affairs to his son Abdullah Sultan.

Abdullah set out to combine all four of the Shaybanids: Bukhara, Samarkand, Tashkent and Balkh in one single state. This took many years and it was only in 1582 that he was able to create a single state out of the four Shaybanids.

To achieve unification, he had to fight a long war to take possession of Tashkent. He then took control of Fergana and in 1573 took Balkh after a long siege.

In 1574, he attacked Qarshi and Hisar, adding them to his possessions. In 1576, he fought off armies from Samarkand and took Tashkent. In the service of Abdullah Khan were Kazakh sultans Sheehan and his son Tauekel.

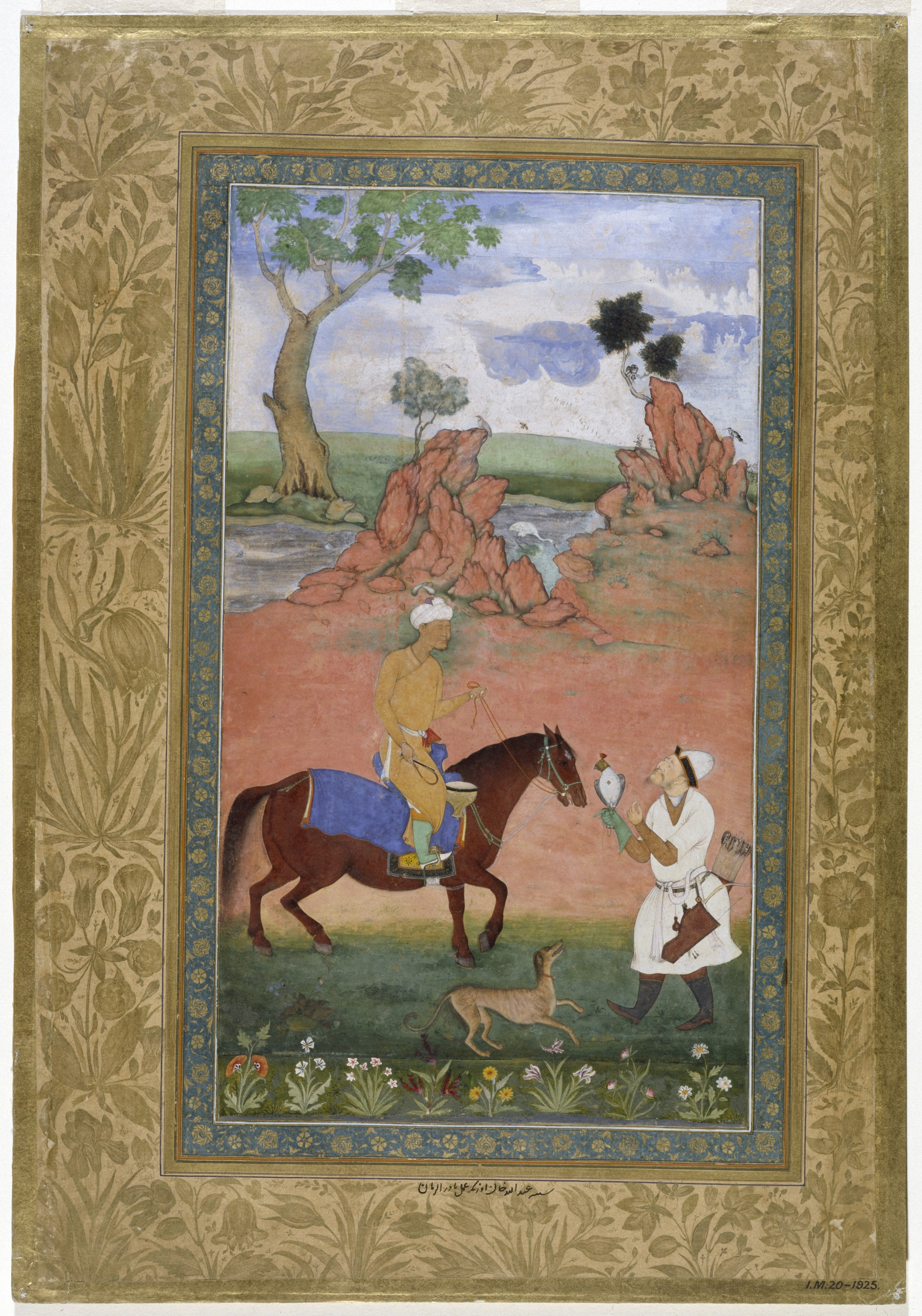
Abdullah Khan out hawking. Painted ca. 1618 in India for Jahangir by Abul-Hasan Nadir al-Zaman, London, Victoria & Albert Museum.

In 1582, Abdullah Khan marched to Dasht-i-Kipchak. Bobo Khan was killed and his fortresses at Shohruhiya Sairam and Ahangeran were captured. In 1583, his son Abd al-Mumin captured and plundered Mashhad. In the same 1583, after the death of his father, Abdullah Khan was declared ruler of the Uzbeks and his state was called the Bukhara Khanate.

=== Abdullah Khan's monetary reform ===
Abdullah Khan II managed, in several stages, monetary reform. To redress the lack of silver metal and silver coins, with his father he organised the regular production of gold coins and controlled their stamp in Bukhara, paying particular attention to maintaining a high standard. The reforms introduced by Abdullah Khan were primarily aimed at changing the content of silver coins in accordance with the rise in prices of silver. At a time when the formal head of the dynasty was still Iskandar Khan (1560–1583), the minting silver coins remained decentralized. However, coins with the name of Iskandar were issued in Bukhara, Samarkand, Balkh, Tashkent, Andijan and Ahsi Yasse (Turkestan).

In 1583, Abdullah Khan made another monetary reform. This reform was centred around the capital, Bukhara (which minted silver coins). For everyday urban trade of consumer goods, Abdullah Khan minted copper coins.

The monetary reforms Abdullah Khan II initiated were successful. They brought to an end the monetary crisis and ceased the mass leakage of currency outside the state. This reform was part of Abdullah Khan II's aim of creating favourable conditions for all types of trade within and to areas outside his state's borders.

=== Expanding the boundaries of the state ===
Combining the Shaybanid state had opened up new opportunities to expand its territorial boundaries. In 1584, Abdullah Khan seized Badakhshan. In 1588 he seized Khorasan.

In the latter period of his reign Abdullah waged a war for the conquest of Khorezm. In 1593-94 Khorezm was finally conquered by Abdullah's troops. Abdullah marched to Khiva and their sultans were captured and executed.

Soon relations soured with the Kazakh khans, who learned about the uprising by Abdullah Khan's son Abdulmumin. Abdullah Khan was forced to go to war with his own son. He prepared an army for the battles ahead, but died before the battle with the Kazakh Chinggisid. The Kazakhs would take advantage of the situation and take Turkestan, Tashkent, Samarkand and Andijan. However, they were unable to take Bukhara and retreated to the Steppe, abandoning all the newly taken territories.

=== Foreign policy ===
During the reign of Abdullah Khan the khanate maintained close diplomatic relations with the Mughal Empire, the Ottoman Empire and the Tsardom of Russia. In a letter dated 1577 Akbar informed Abdullah Khan Uzbek about his intention to expel the Portuguese from India.

Russian ties with Bukhara soured in the early 1580s due to Abdullah Khan's support for the Siberian Khan Kuchum.

=== Tribal composition of troops ===
Abdullah Khan's army consisted of detachments of soldiers from various Uzbek tribes including the: Shirins, Utarchs, Bishyuzs, Jalairs, Keralas, Katagans, Tan-Yaruks, Alchins, Hitays, Bahrin, Naimans, Manghud, Kushchis, Arguns, Mings, Karluks, Kungrats, and Tubais (tuvas).

=== Cultural policies ===
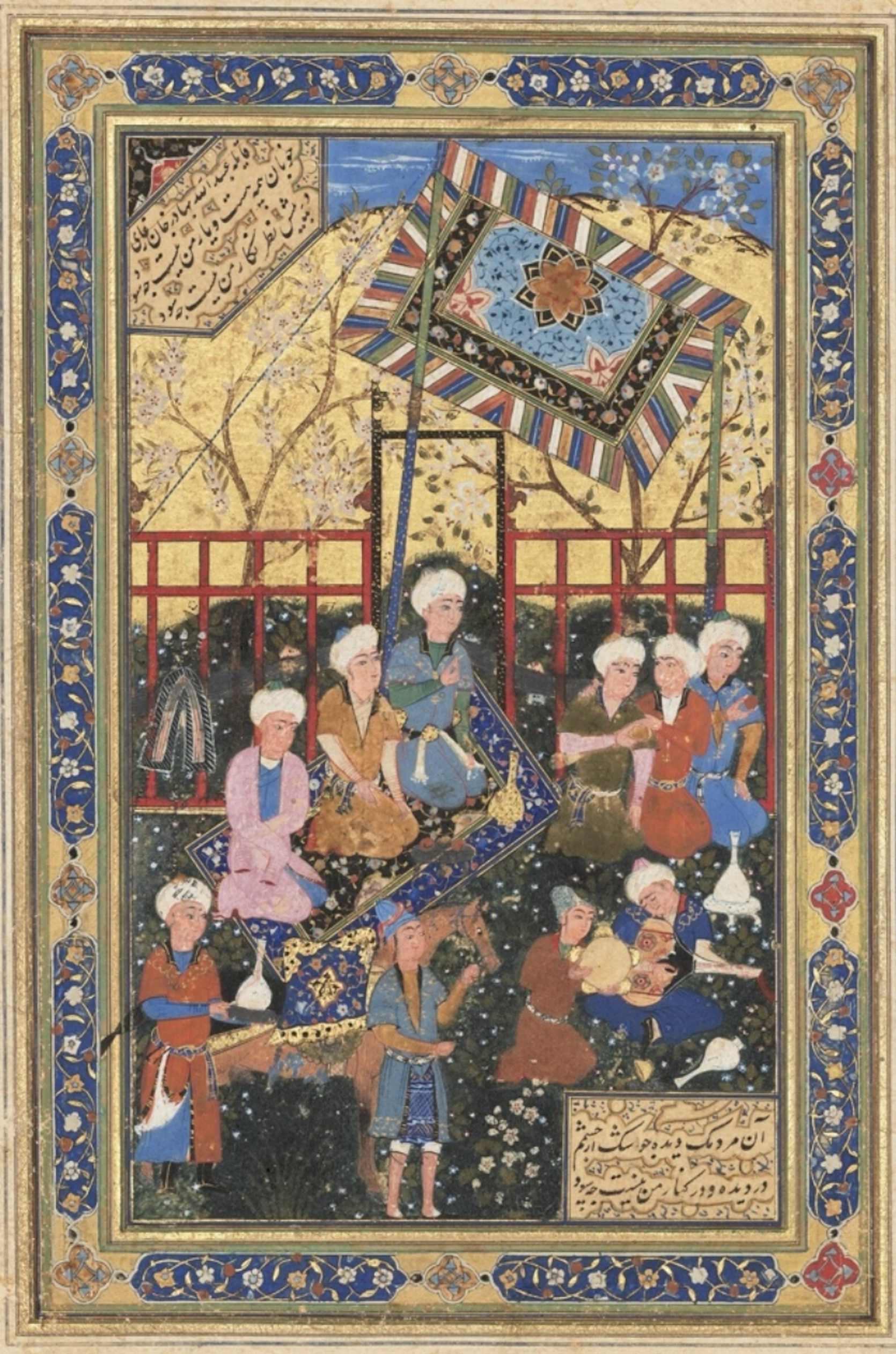
Folio with two poetry couplets by ‘Abd-ullāh II, in a manuscript possibly copied for him

Abdullah Khan was not only a talented warrior, but also an outstanding statesman. He cared about strengthening Bukhara's trade ties abroad (especially with Russia and India) and paid great attention to the construction of public buildings and structures - madrassahs and khanqahs, shopping malls and caravanserais, reservoirs and bridges.

During Abdullah Khan II's reign, the Kosh-Madrasah was erected in Bukhara. It consists of two madrassas. First, there was the Modarikhan madrasah, built around 1567 in honour of Abdullah Khan's mother. Then there was the Madrasahs named after Abdullah Khan, which was built between 1588 and 1590.

Abdullah Khan was also a patron of education and a philanthropist. He surrounded himself with scholars, writers and chroniclers. Court poets and historians praised him. Among the poets was Abdurahmon Mushfiqi, author of laudatory odes, lyric poems and epigrams. He was also an able diplomat. On behalf of Abdullah Khan, Mushfiqi provided grandiloquent labels for buildings. Court historian Hafiz Tanish provided a rich chronicle of facts about Abdullah's rule. Literature continued to develop in Persian, Turkish and Arabic. According to the observations of Russian academic V V Bartold "historical literature produced by the Uzbeks was even higher in quality and quantity than in the previous century."

Abdullah Khan II wrote poems and left his legacy under the pseudonym "'Avaz Gazi".

=== Death and Succession ===
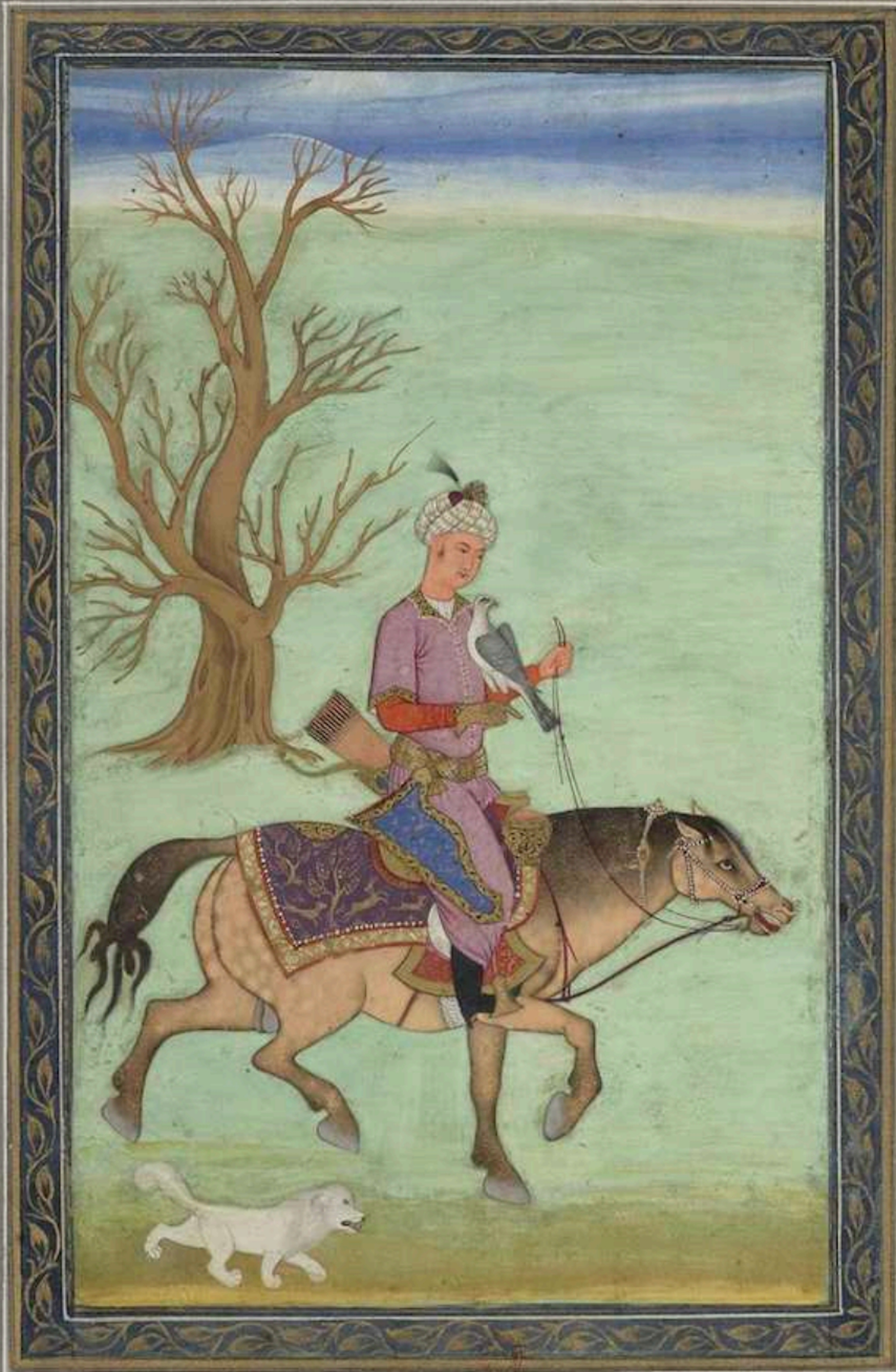
‘Abd al-Mu’min, the only son of ‘Abdullāh Khan (d. 1598), hunting, as seen by an Indian painter, XVIIIth c.

Abdullah Khan died in 1598 and was buried at the mausoleum of Bahauddin Naqshbandi near Bukhara.

After the death of Abdullah, the throne passed to his only son Abd al-Mumin, but he was soon killed by the rebels. As the son of Abd al-Mumin was only two years old, the first cousin of Abdullah Khan II, Pir Muhammad II, was chosen as new Khan. This appointment was contested by several other rulers, like Tauekel Khan of the Kazakhs, Kasim Sultan and Baqi Muhammad, son of Abdullah Khan's sister, and a prince from Astrakhan named Djani Beg. Baqi Muhammad was victorious and Pir Muhammad II was killed in battle. With his death, the Shaybanid dynasty ended, and Baqi Muhammad became the first Khan of the Janid or Ashtarkhanid dynasty.

== See also ==
- Emirate of Bukhara
- Russian Turkestan
- Turkestan
