= Farangi-Sazi =

Style of Persian painting

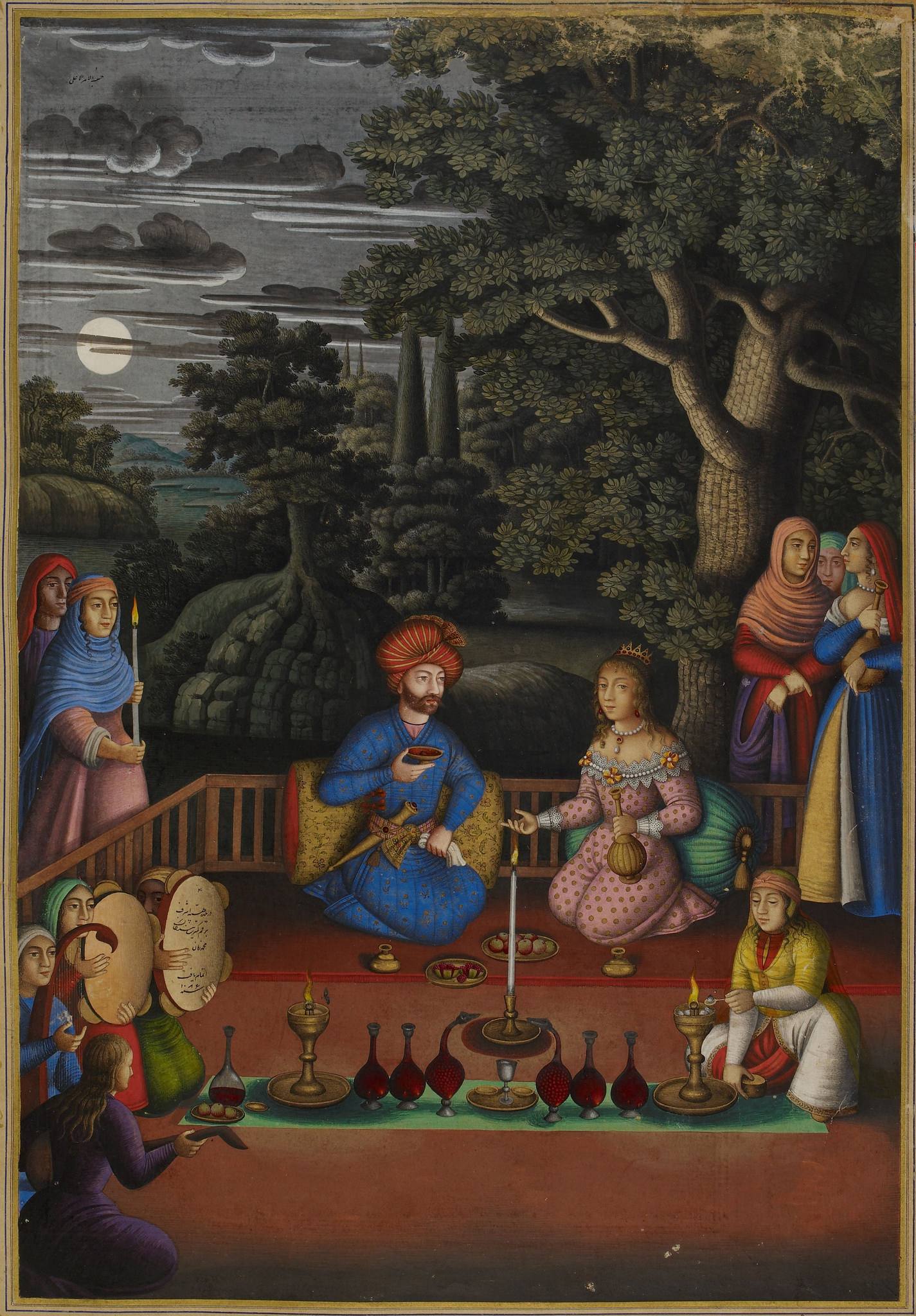
"Bahram Gur with the Indian Princess," Mohammad Zaman, 1675/76

Farangi-Sazi (Persian: فرنگی‌سازی, lit. 'Making in an Occidental manner') was a style of Persian painting that originated in Safavid Iran in the second half of the 17th century. This style of painting emerged during the reign of Shah Abbas II (r. 1642–1666), but first became prominent under Shah Solayman I (r. 1666–1694).

Farangi-sazi paintings depicted many types of different scenarios, varying from traditional Iranian scenes, such as portrayal of kings and aristocrats, to European depictions, sceneries, biblical, and mythological events. The style because an item of significance, for it was used to amplify core values and beliefs in the Safavid community.

Only a few 17th-century artists made paintings in the style of Farangi-sazi, with the most prominent ones being Aliqoli Jebadar, an artist that raised through the ranks of the Safavid court, and Mohammad Zaman, the one who introduced Farangi-sazi and the painter of one of the most famous Farangi-sazi paintings: Bahram Gor with the Indian Princess.

== The terms & characteristics ==
Note: "Saz" refers to the artists and "sazi" their works.

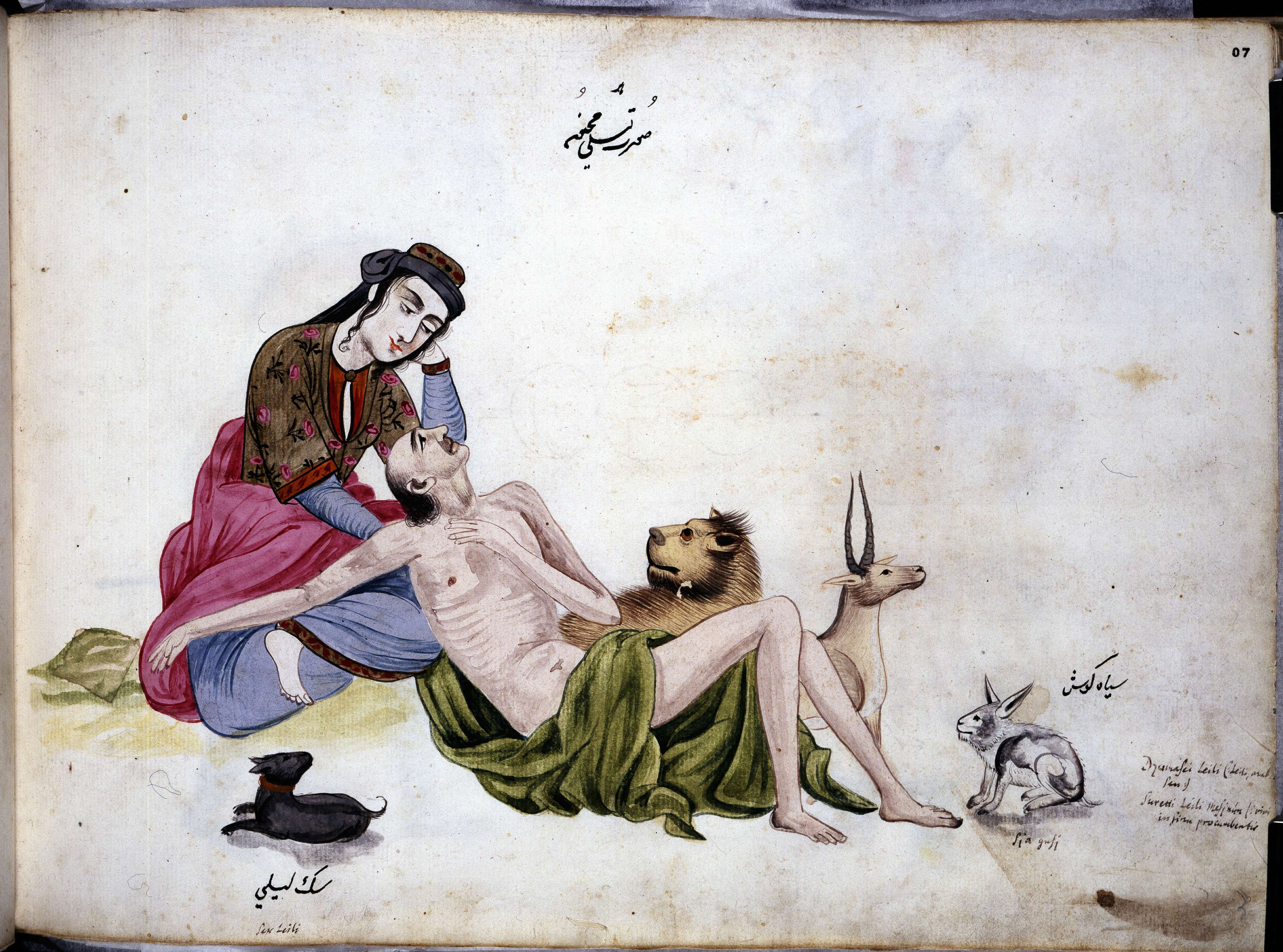
Scene from Layla and Majnun. Drawn by Jani in 1684/85 AD (1096 AH) for Engelbert Kaempfer's costume album (now in the British Museum). Notice the use of European techniques like shadow and modelling

The term "Farangi-sazi" as used today seems to have developed in the early 20th century. Specific to late Safavid painting & its derivatives, it excludes the work of later European-trained painters like Sani al-Mulk and Kamal ol-Molk. The word, Farangi, means "Frank" in English, deriving from the word "Franc", as that word has been used across Asia and Africa to describe people of European descent, foreigners, or Western influence in general. Farangi-sazi, in simple terms, means "Frank style", or European art style.

The 17th century artist Jani sometimes signed his paintings "Farangi saz" while he was working for a doctor in Isfahan. He filled a forty-five page sketchbook for him, but outside of that, no other contemporary use of the term is known.

Per Negar Habibi, "Farangi-sazi" requires more than a "discreet use of a European technique, a mere presence of chiaroscuro or perspective... The Occidentalist character of some late 17th-century Persian paintings is borne out by the presence of European cultural elements, not in an exhaustive or scientific way, but rather in order to capture some evocative traits and fantasies.” Many of these said "fantasies" includes stories from noble courts and religion, both from Christianity and Islam.

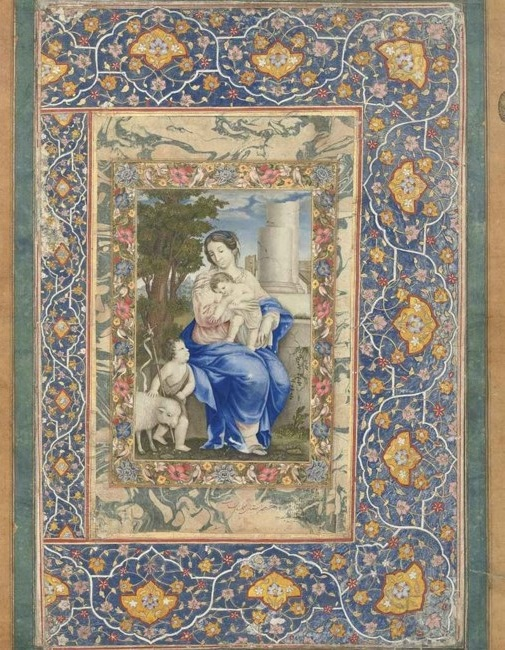
Top: Madonna & child, signed Mohammad Zaman, 1682/83. Right: Jacques Goullon enamel watch ca 1645–50 based on Jacques Stella's Sainte Famille avec Saint Jean-Baptiste (1635)

=== Characteristics ===
Multiple methods and manners were added into the traditional artwork to create "Farangi-Sazi." Innovations associated with "Farangi-Sazi" include the following:

- The use of perspective to indicate depth within paintings.
- The importance given to landscape and describing what occurred in the world.
- Chiaroscuro, the use of contrast between light and dark colors, promoting shading and highlighting other features.
- The use of watercolor and stippling, a technique that uses small dots to promote shading or different degrees of solidity.
  - The use of stippling may have been inspired by paintings on imported enamel objects, like hand watches.
- Different bodily proportions that mimics the European Renaissance's style that Islamic artisans took inspiration from.

Despite taking heavy inspiration from these standards, these innovations don't always strictly follow European conventions. The direction of lighting, for example, is often unclear except in candlelit night scenes, and its exposure is often inconsistent.

== Artists ==
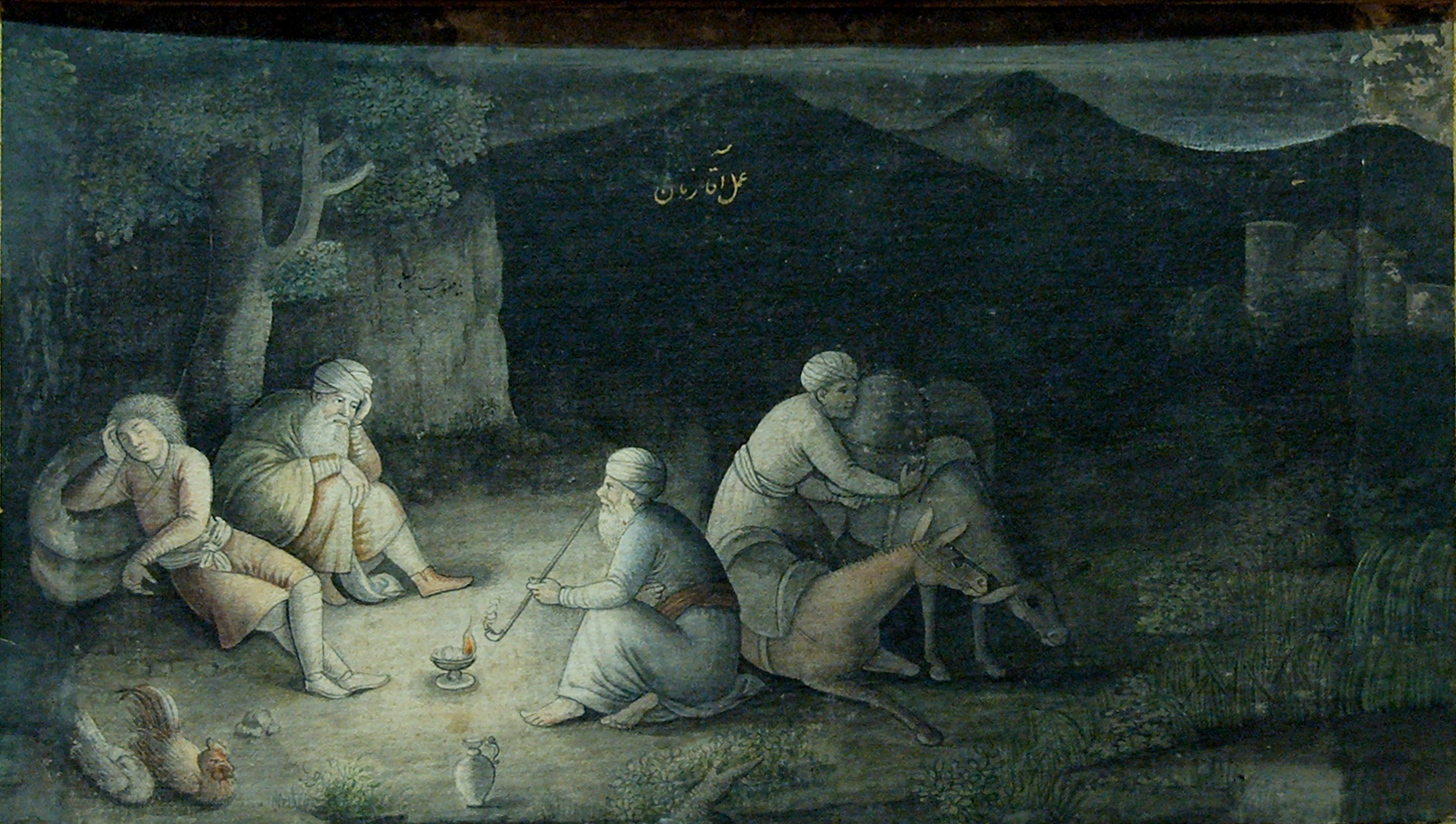
Night Halt, 1660–75. Louvre

=== Mohammad Zaman ibn Haji Yusuf Qumi ===
Mohammad Zaman seems to have been active between 1649 and 1704. He died sometime before 1720/21. Very little is known about his life aside from his (and his pupils') inscriptions.

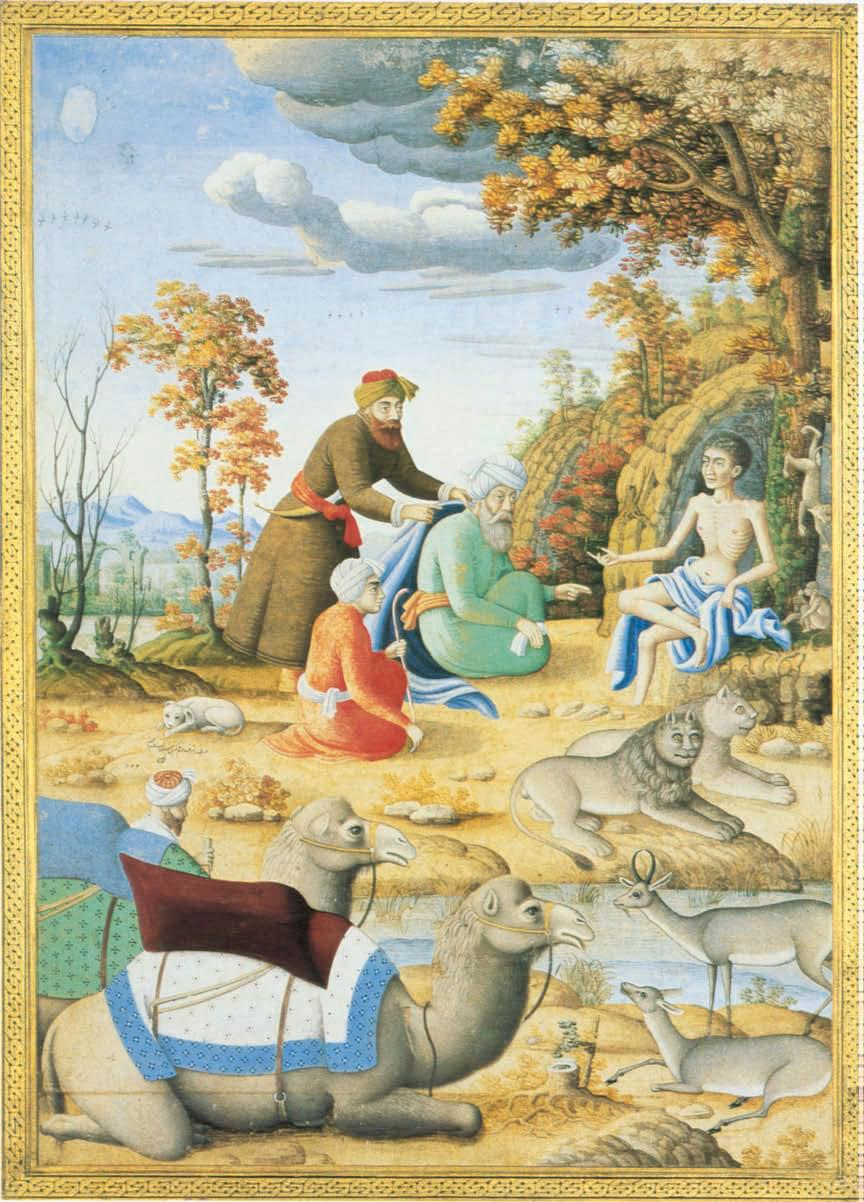
Majnun in the Wilderness. Mohammad Zaman, 1676 addition to a 16th century Khamsa

There was a belief that he studied in Rome, converted to Christianity, and fled to India, however that has been rejected by Anatoly Ivanov, a Russian interdisciplinary artist, and other art creators.

He is best known for his narrative illustrations for the Khamsa of Nizami and the Shahnameh as well as his variants on European prints. He is sometimes known as "the father of Farangi-Sazi".

He is often associated with the signature "ya sahib al-zaman", however he wasn't the only one to have used it. (Note: There were a series of painters who signed their works with this inscription in the 18th century See object description: https://www.metmuseum.org/art/collection/search/448442 For other "Zamans": https://commons.wikimedia.org/wiki/File:Portrait_of_Shah_Abbas_II,_by_Mohammad_Zaman_III_(active_1758-1795),_Qajar_Iran,_second_half_18th_century.jpg Deux filles | Musées d'art et d'histoire de Genève (mahmah.ch) Un rossignol et une rose | Musées d'art et d'histoire de Genève (mahmah.ch) File:Eagle on a Tree - Agha Zaman II - Islamic Consultative Assembly Museum of Iran.jpg - Wikimedia Commons File:Sheikh San'an and the Christian Girl - Agha Zaman II - Islamic Consultative Assembly Museum of Iran.jpg - Wikipedia File:Rose and Nightingale - Agha Zaman II - Islamic Consultative Assembly Museum of Iran.jpg https://harvardartmuseums.org/collections/object/351869?position=351869 https://www.sothebys.com/en/auctions/ecatalogue/2009/arts-of-the-islamic-world-l09723/lot.68.html)

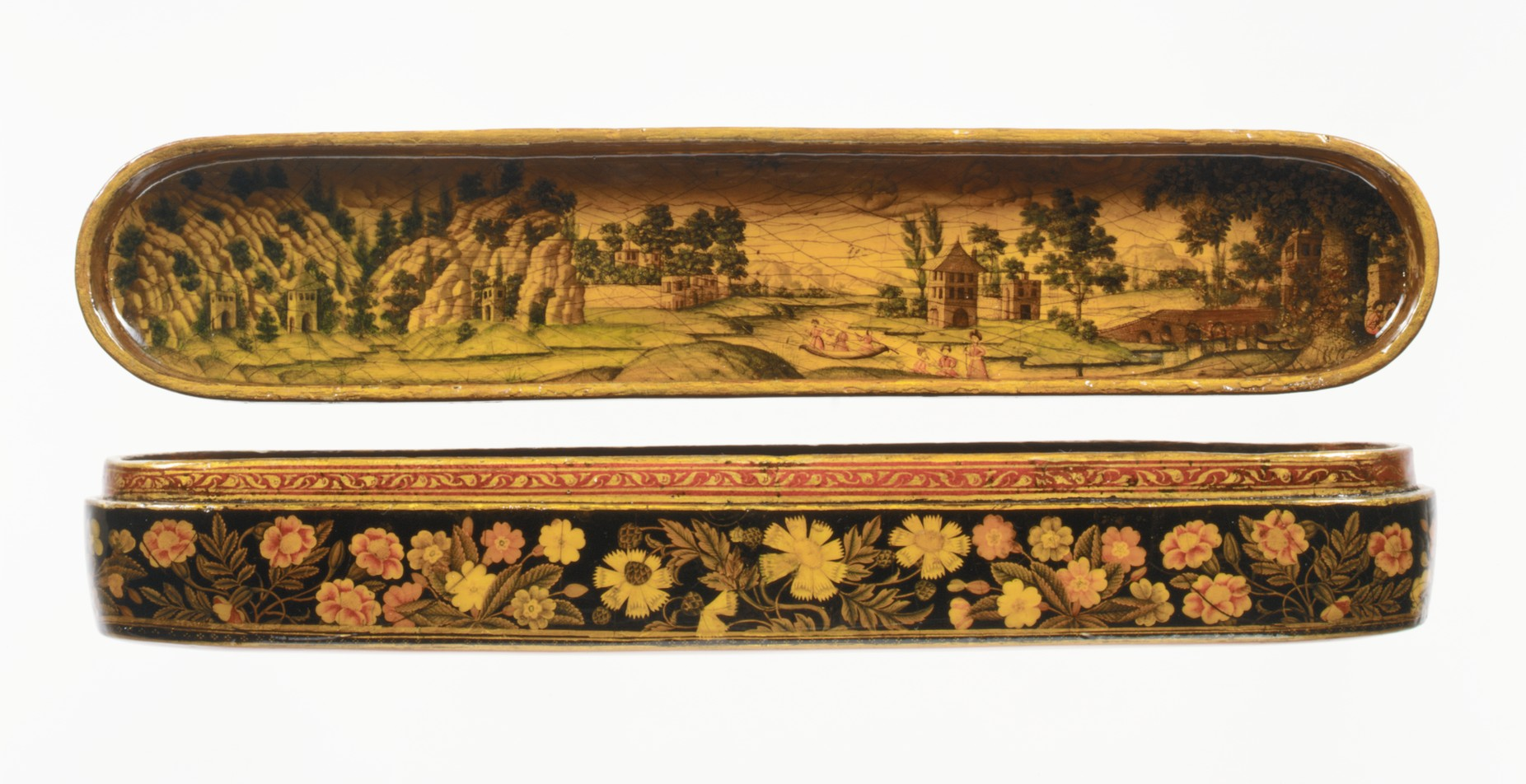
Pen Box with a Europeanizing Landscape, late 17th-early 18th century. Signed by Haji Mohammad. Met Museum

Family

Not much is known about his family, but he did have a brother named Haji Mohammad Ebrahim (Note: Note: The Grove Encyclopedia entry for Muhammad Zaman says he had a brother named Muhammad Ibrahim (ibn Hajji Yusuf) but does not mention him using "Haji Muhammad". However, the Iranica article on Farangi-sazi by Negar Habibi does mention Muhammad Zaman having a brother named "Haji Mohammad-Ebrahim". Also see the listing here: https://www.metmuseum.org/art/collection/search/454014) and two sons, named Mohammad Ali & Mohammad Yusuf, all of which were artists themselves.

Haji Mohammad Ebrahim produced some surviving lacquer paintings. He may have worked with his brother on a privately commissioned Khamsa in the Morgan Library; however, this attribution has been disputed. (Note: Skeptics point out how its illustrations are of poorer quality than Muhammad Zaman's better-known illustrations in royal manuscripts. Langer suggests this "uncharacteristic haste" can be explained by the fact that the manuscript was produced for a private patron, perhaps on a tight schedule.)

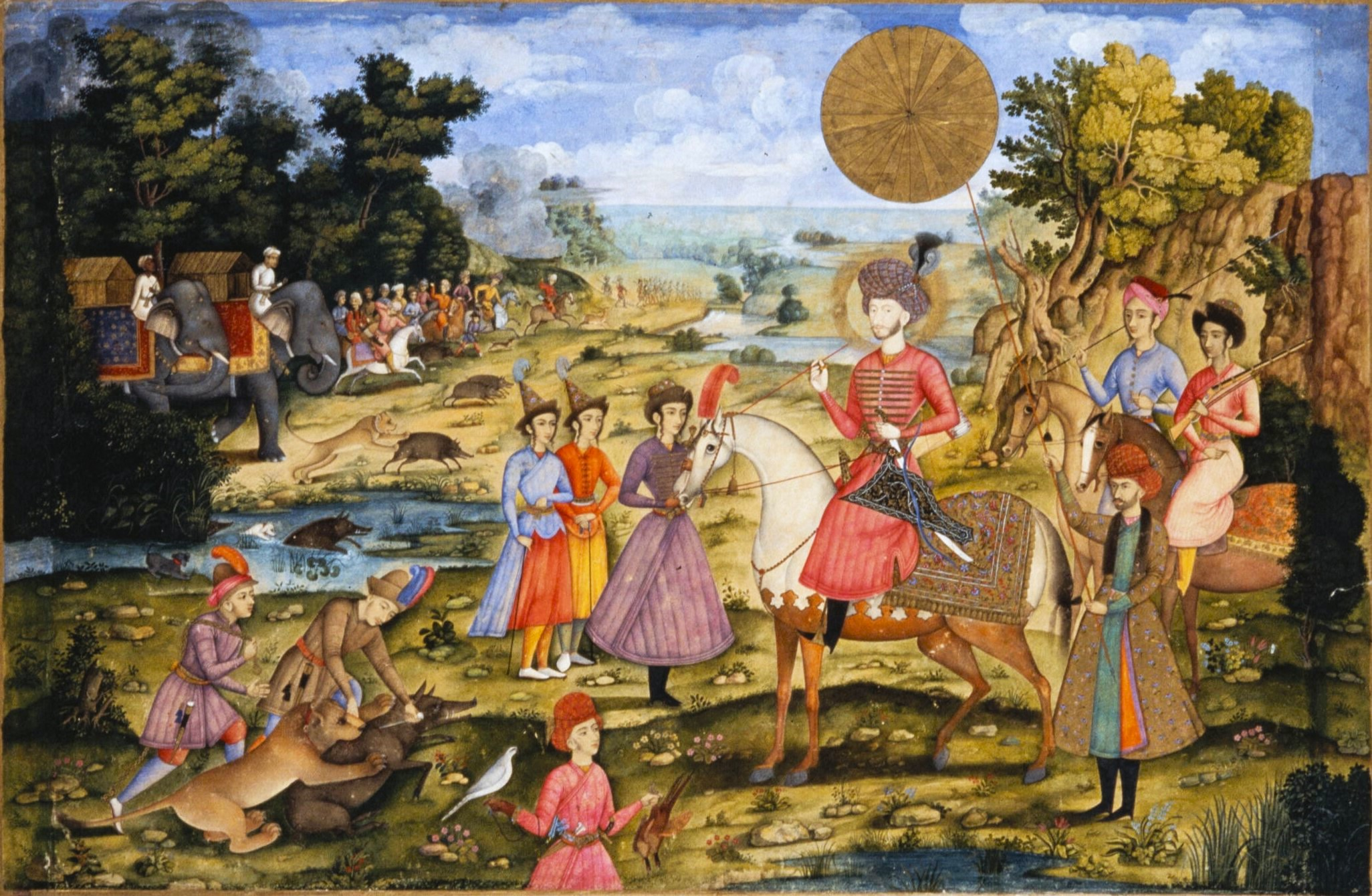
Shah (possibly Suleiman I) and hunting party. Unsigned folio from the St. Petersburg Muraqqa attr: Ali Quli Jabbehdar. Courtesy Harvard Special Collections

=== Aliquli Jabbadar ===
His last name, Jabbadar, suggests that Aliquli Jabbadar was a steward of the Royal Armoury (Jebakhana).

It is speculated that he is from Georgian or Albanian origin, based on details in his inscriptions, like referring himself as farangi , "the Frank". He also referred himself as ghulāmzāda-i qadimi ("former slave"), beg ("lord"), naqqash-bashi ("head of mosaics") and jabbadār ("keeper of the armory").

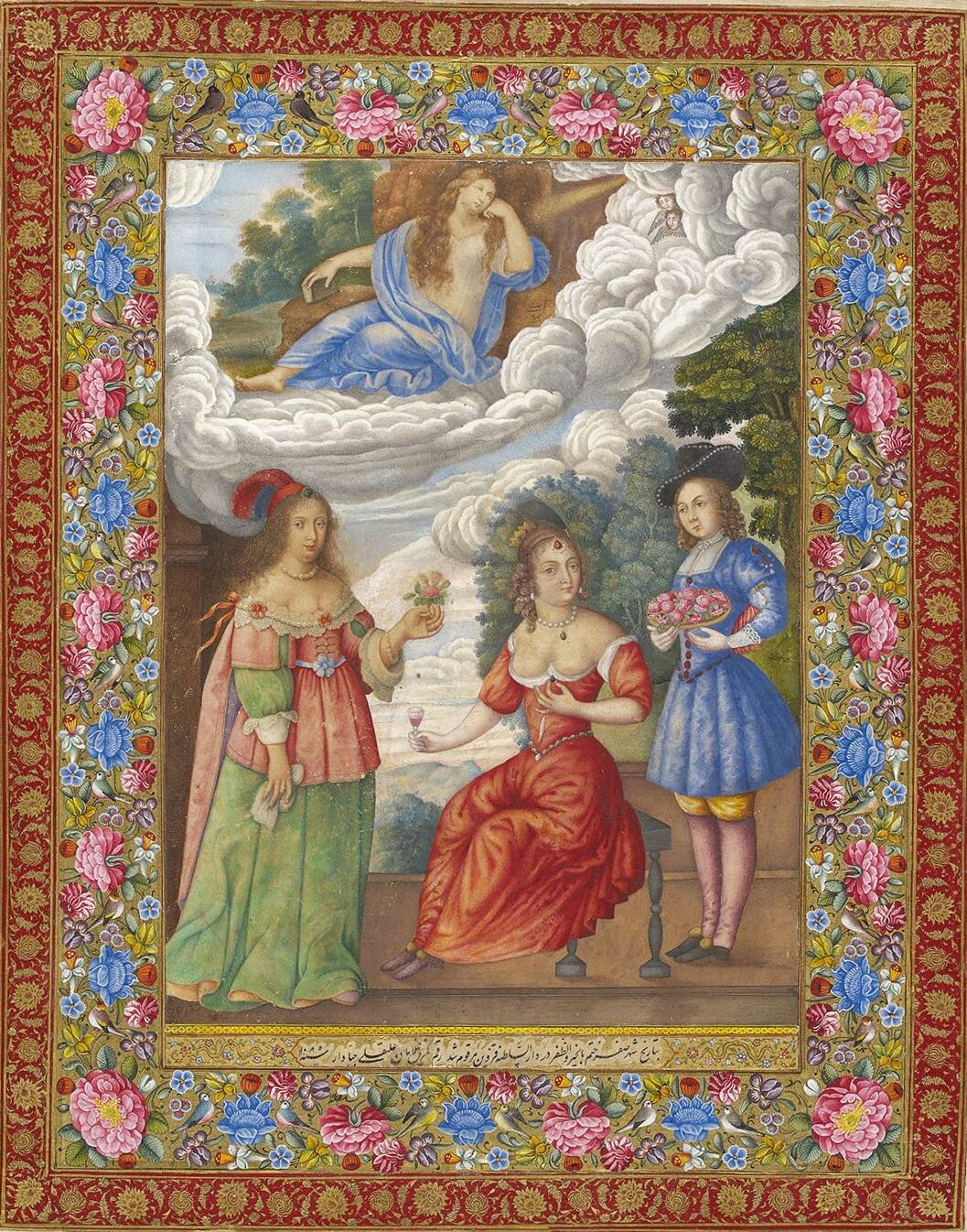
F.93a from the St. Petersburg Muraqqa. RAS E-14

Close copies of European prints are rare. Instead, his derivative works are often composites of elements taken from multiple sources. Per Habibi, his work is characterized by bright colors, a rejection of outline, and an avoidance of heavy contrasts.

He also produced group portraits recording court ceremony & activities. Several are in the St. Petersburg Muraqqa. Many of his other art pieces remain in museums in Russia and the United States.

== History and context ==
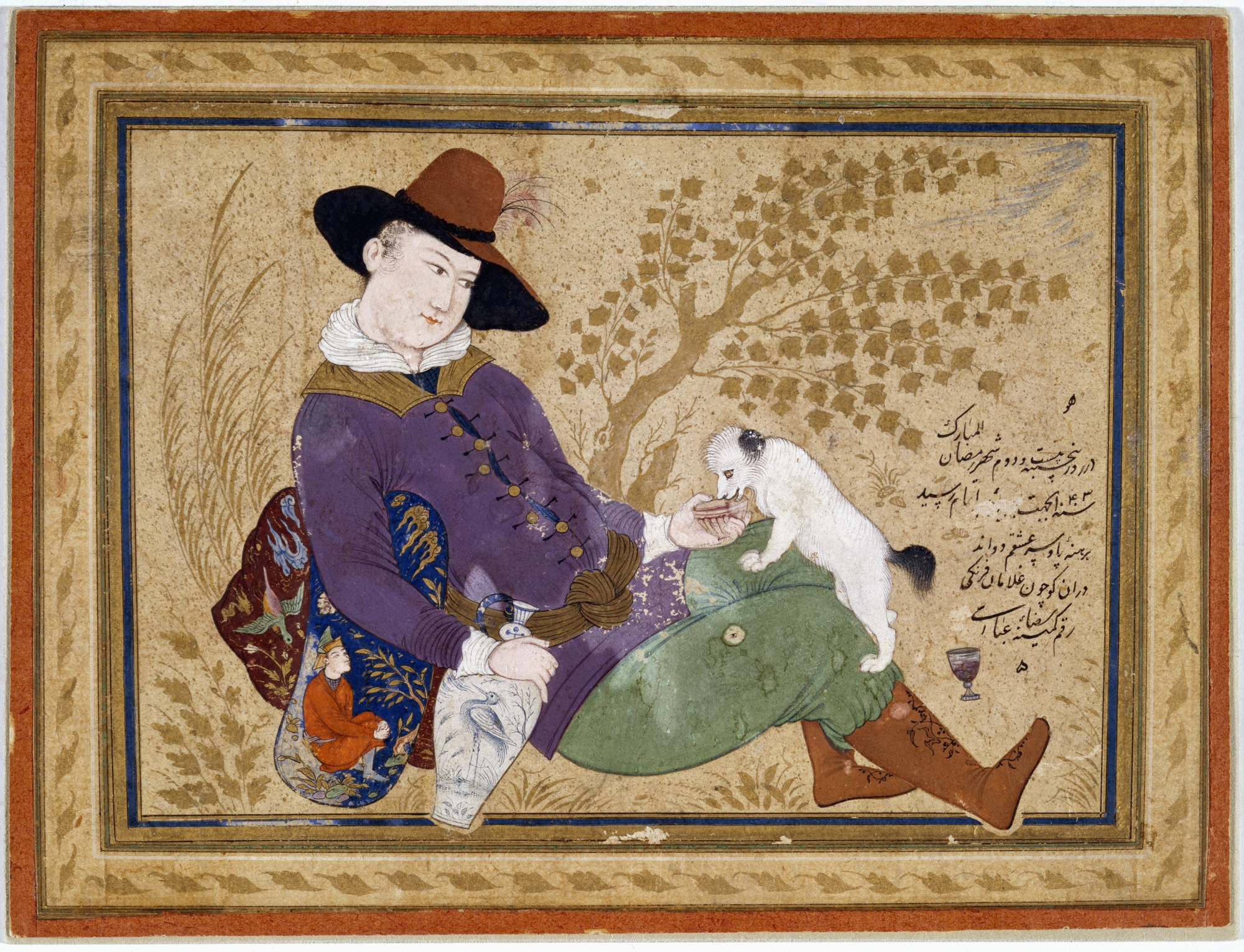
Riza-i Abbasi: Young Portuguese (1634) - Detroit Institute of Arts

=== Background ===
After Tahmasp's kitabkhana closed in 1555, miniature production shifted towards standalone pieces, spawning new genres like single-figure portraits and the nude. These also included ghulam-i farangi, depictions of young men in European dress reflecting the growing European presence in Abbas I's reign.

European prints (Note: In the reign of Abbas I, one Alessandro Scudenoli ran a shop with Italian art in a Isfahan bazaar) made an impression on local artists, occasionally leading to the borrowing of poses and motifs. (Note: A similar process occurred at the same time in the Mughal Empire (and Deccan Sultanates) with greater frequency and intensity. See Farrukh Beg's portrait of a Sufi sage based on Durer's Melancholia I, dated 1615 after his return to Agra.) Take the series below, which Stuart Cary Welch suggested was based on a Marcantonio Raimondi engraving.

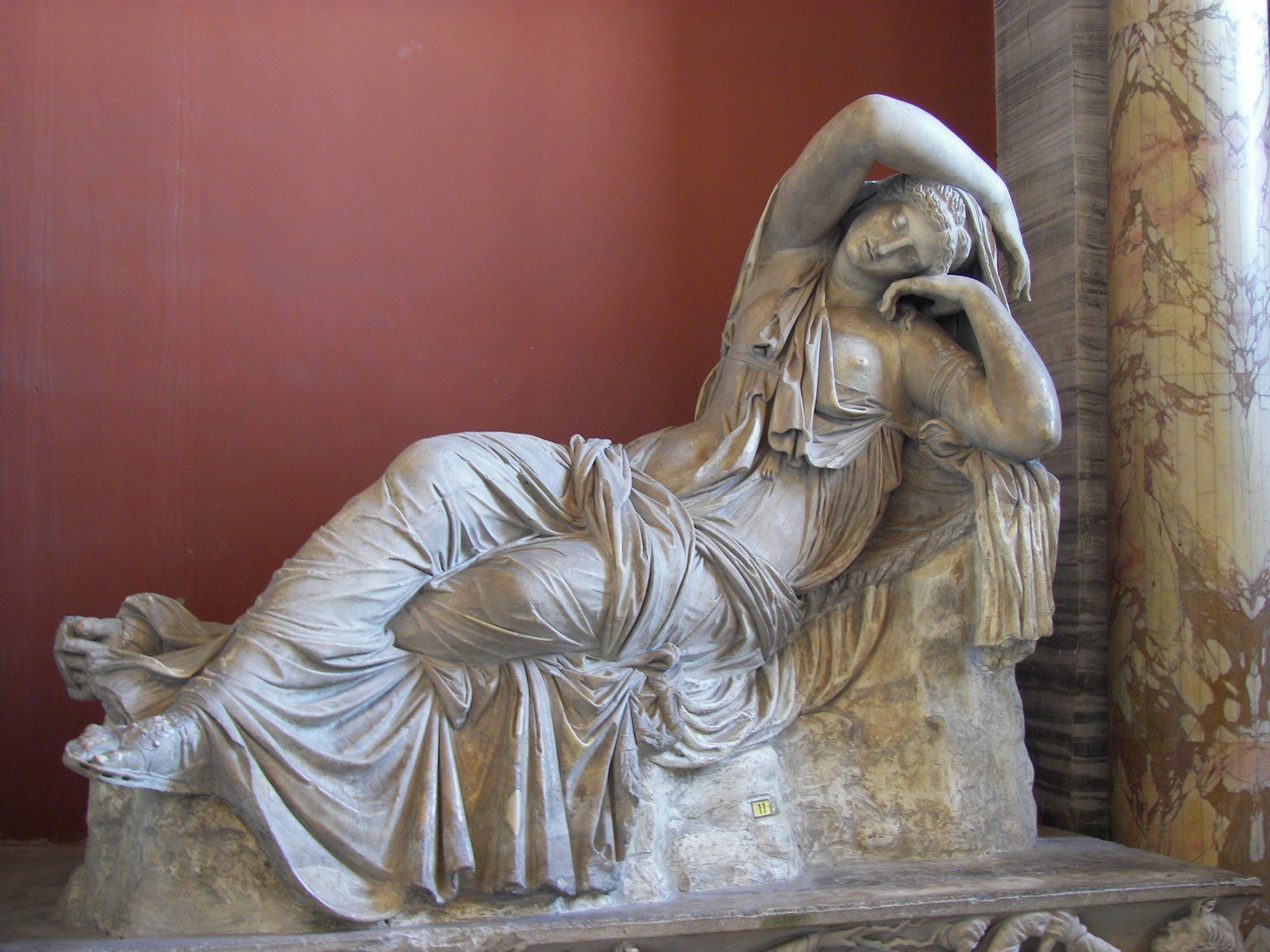
Sleeping Ariadne. Roman copy of a 2nd BC Hellenistic sculpture.

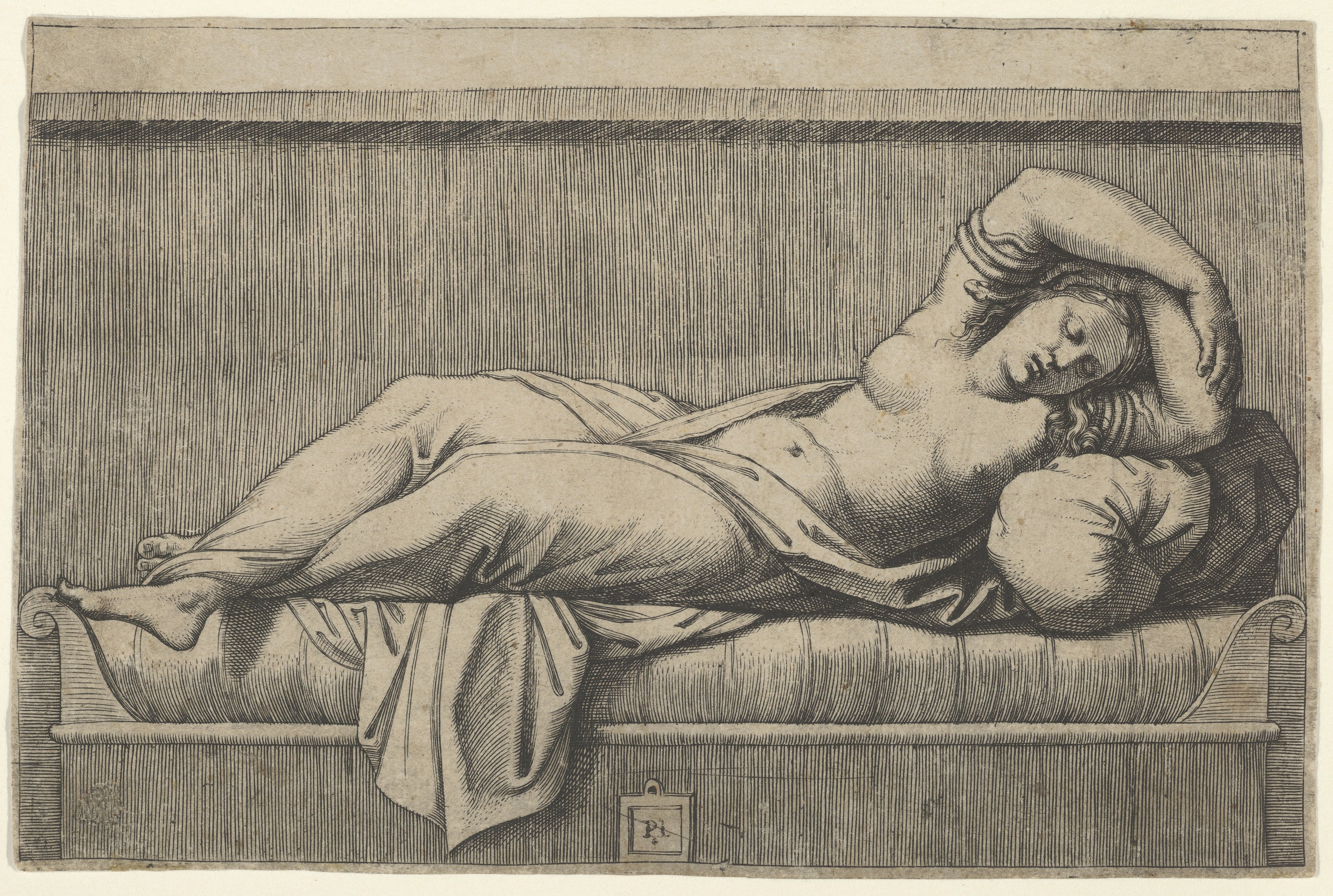
Cleopatra, Marcantonio Raimondi. Rome, ca 1515-27. Based on the Sleeping Ariadne.

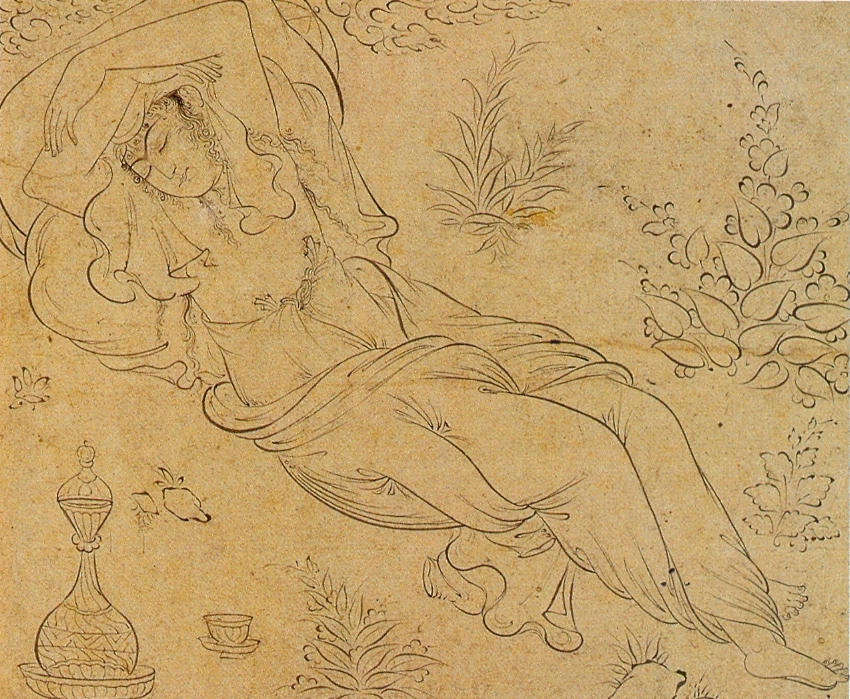
Maiden Reclines, attributed Reza Abbasi, late 16th century, Sackler Museum.

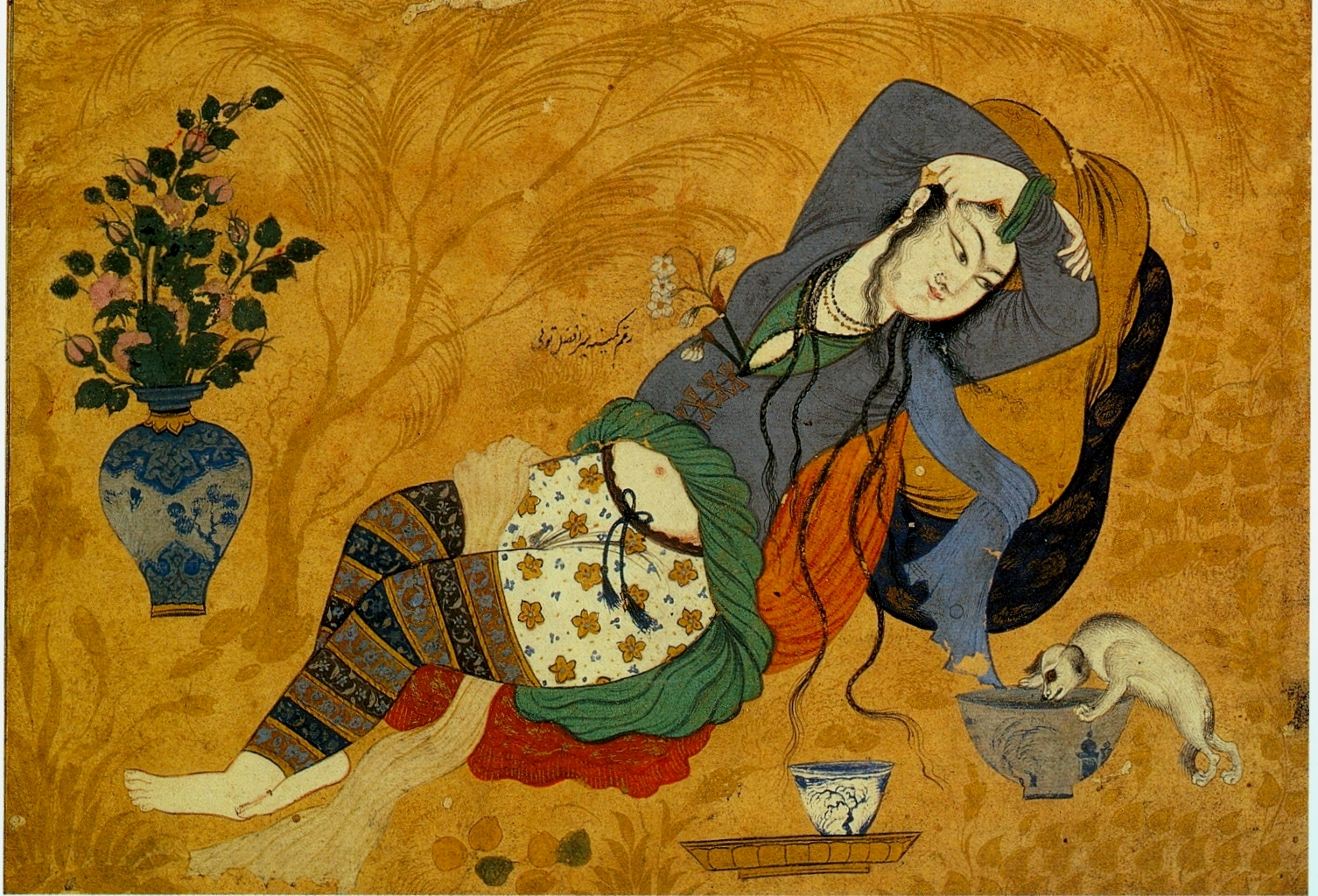
Mir Afzal Tuni. Isfahan, ca. 1640. Modeled on a ca. 1595 nude by Reza Abbasi

European visitors (Note: and also the shah's Armenian subjects; see Langer for recorded instances) often brought works of art as gifts to the Safavid court, (Note: These included the medieval Morgan Bible (gifted to Abbas I,1608) as well as portraits of Charles I of England and his wife Henrietta Maria (gifted to Shah Safi, 1638; not extant). They also included decorative objects like enameled watches) and a few worked as artists themselves, like Philips Angel II (ca. 1653-55). (Note: However, none of their works are known to survive) The New Julfa Armenian community also played a role in transmitting European artistic influence. A few poorly documented Armenian painters- "Marcos" and "Minas" (Note: Minas studied under a Dutch artist in Aleppo. No known works by him survive.)- were producing oil-on-canvas portraits in Isfahan in the 1630s & 40s. Note similarities between the Europeanizing murals of Chehel Sotoun and some wall paintings in New Julfa; precedence uncertain.

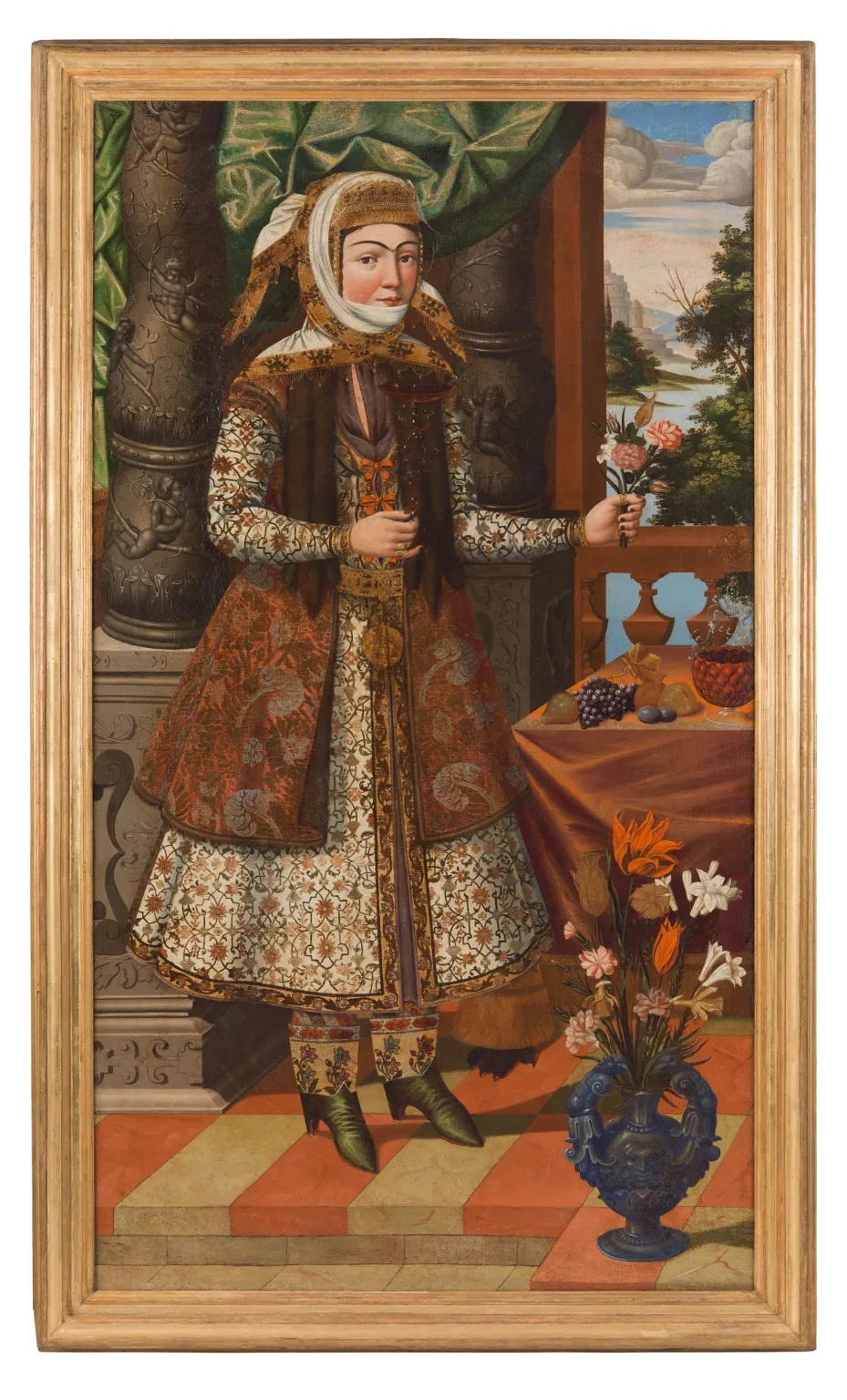
Portrait of an Armenian lady, Isfahan, c. 1650–1675. MIA Doha. See also: three pre-1650 portraits in the Royal Collection signed by Marcos.

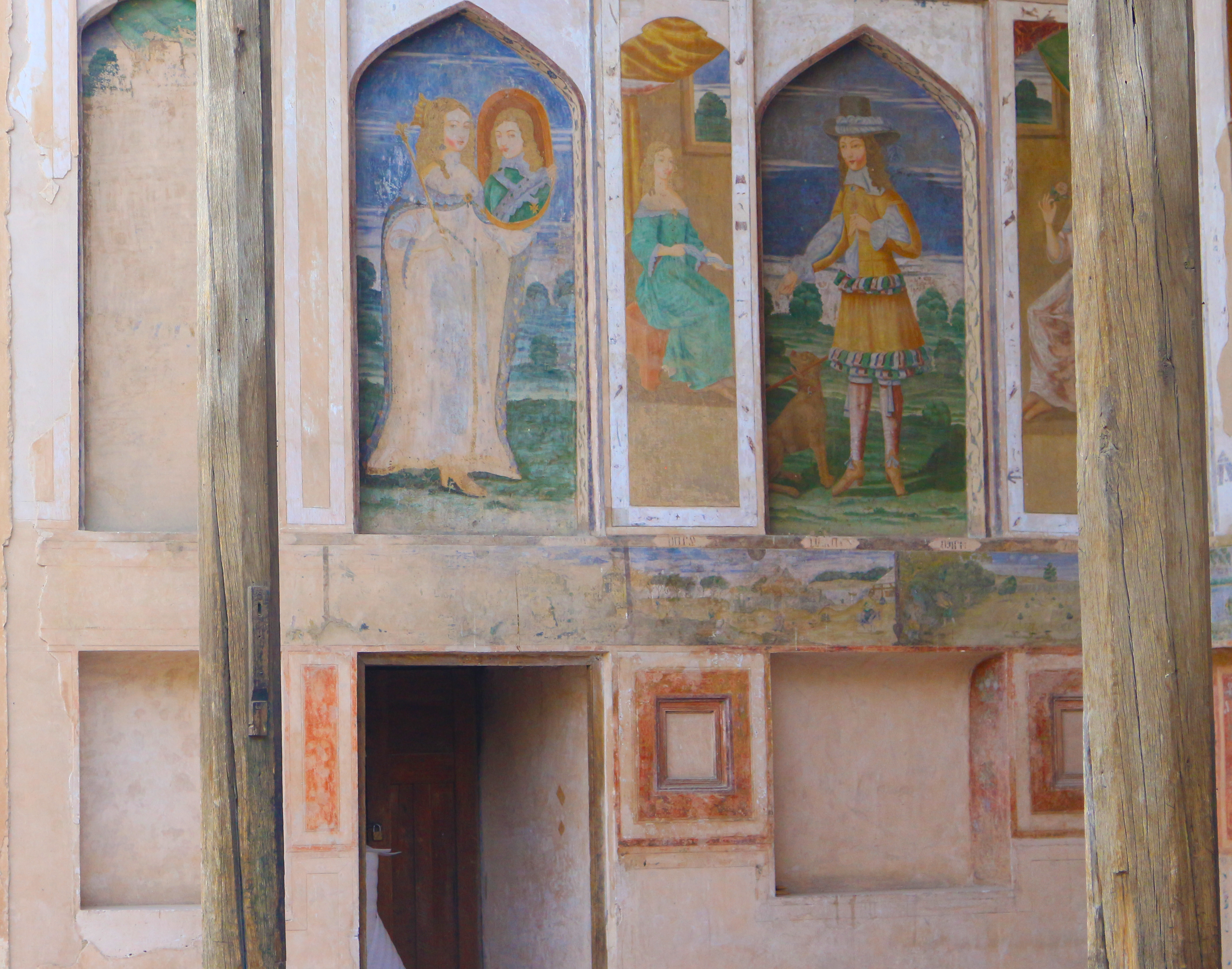
Sukiasyan House, New Julfa, Isfahan.

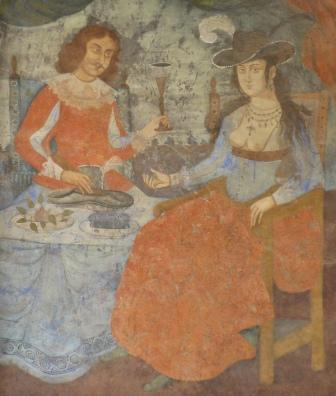
A Chehel Sotoun mural. Dating contested, but probably sometime in the mid-17th century.

=== The style develops ===
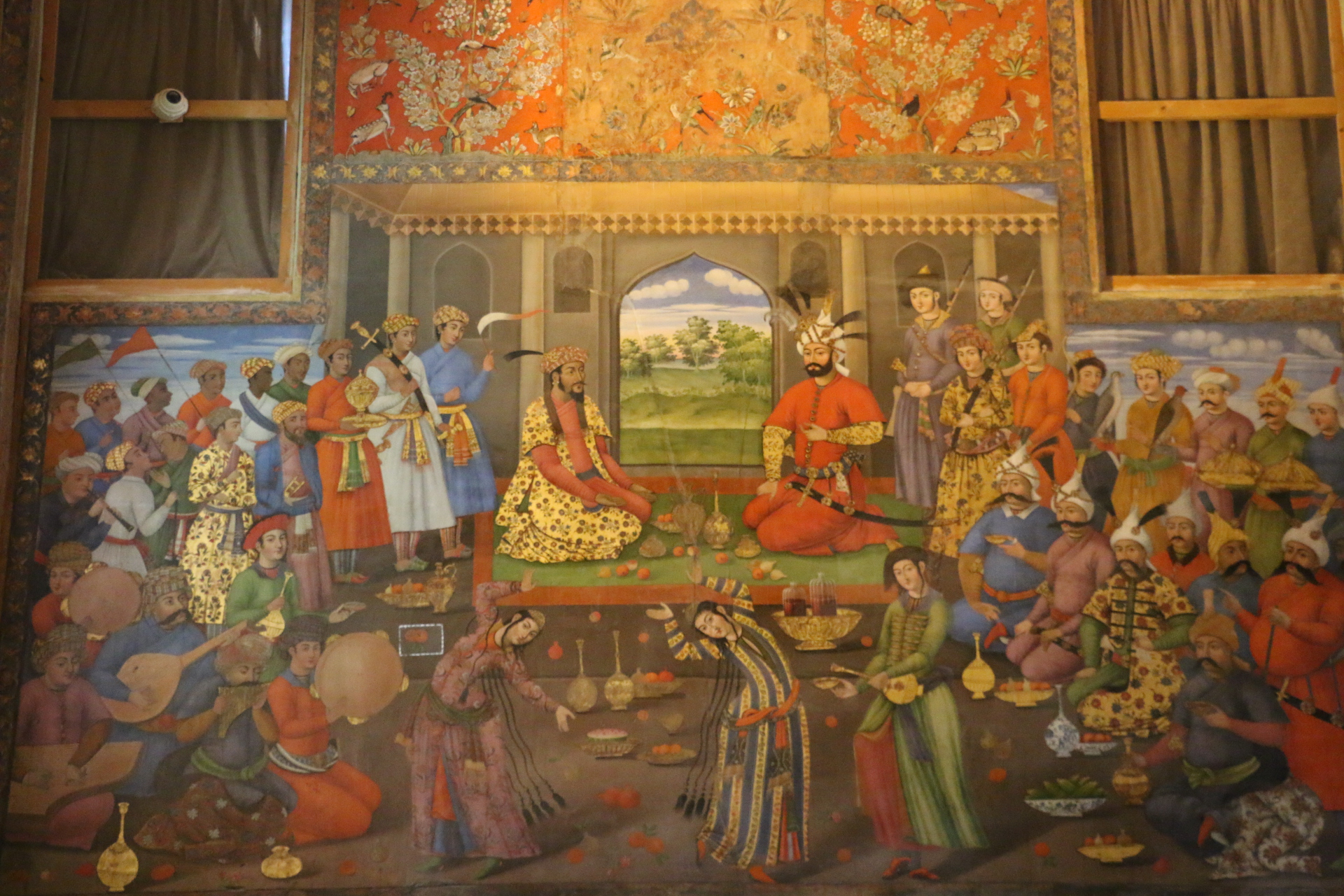
Chehel Sotoun mural. Date contested. Probably between 1647 and 1660

The late Safavid Europeanizing style possibly originated in building projects like Chehel Sotoun (mid-1600s), whose wall paintings were a blend of variety of artistic traditions- Persian, European, Armenian.

European paintings & prints held in the Khazana (Note: e.g. Royal Treasury) & Jebakhana (Note: Royal Treasury) may also have served as a model. Aliquli Jabbadar's name suggests he was once a steward of the Jebakhana.

=== Maturity ===
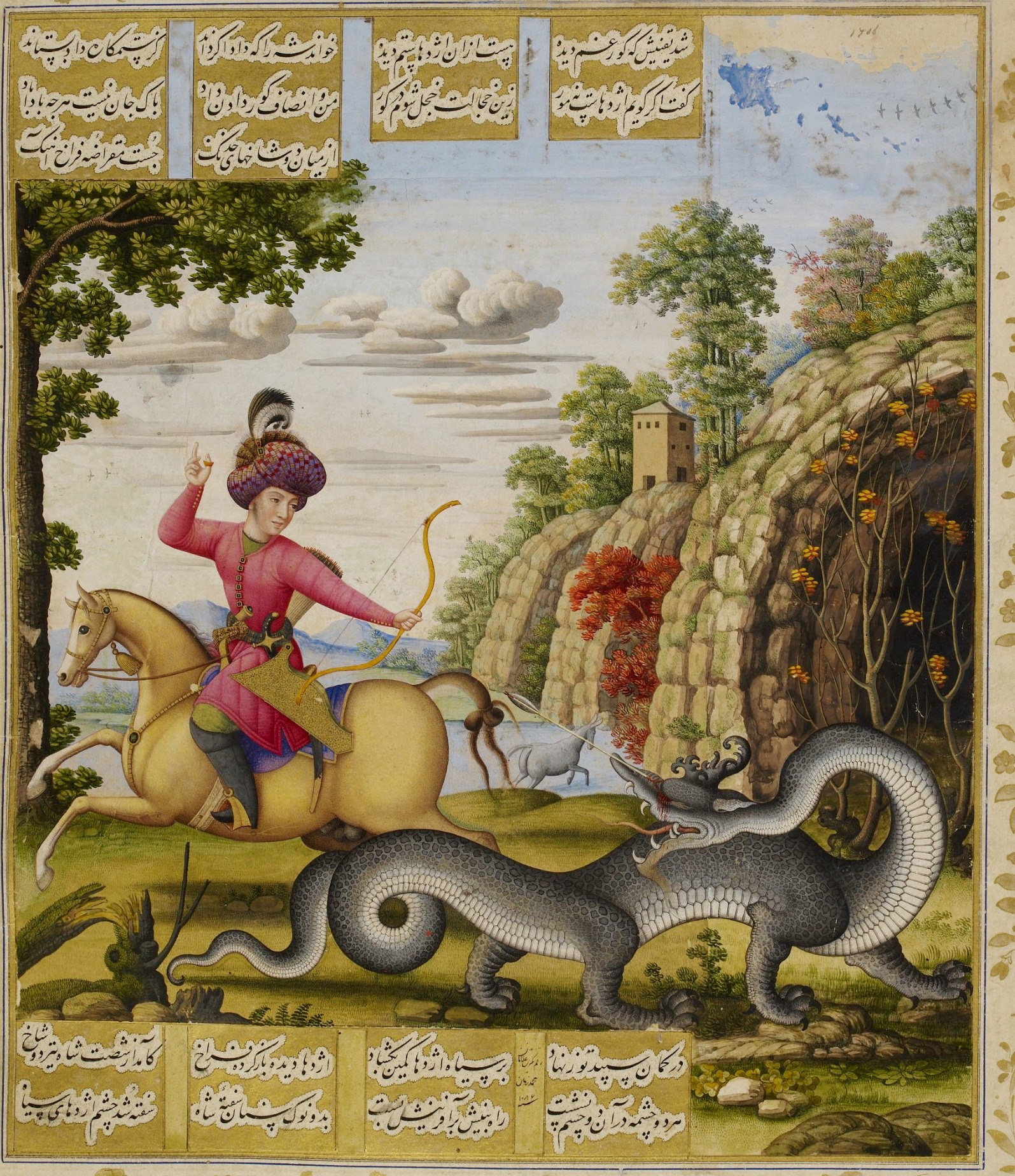
Bahram Gur and the dragon. Mohammad Zaman, 1675. Folio 203v of a British Library Khamsa, Or. 2265

By the 1670s, Farangi sazi was used to depict quintessential Persian subjects: scenes from the Shahnameh, (Note: See this 1663-69 Shahnameh in the Metropolitan Museum) Nizami's Khamsa, and contemporary court life.

The style was one of several that coexisted in the 17th century. Through Mo'en Mosavver and others, the tradition of Reza Abbasi persisted without strong European influence, while other artists like Sheikh Abbasi and his son Ali Naqi worked in an Indian-influenced mode. Still others- among them Reza Abbasi's son Mohammad Shafi- pioneered genres like the gol o morg (flower and bird), sometimes influenced by European and Mughal models. These artists took cues selectively from European & Mughal conventions, adopting a new approach to light and shadow and to landscape.

=== Later developments ===
The hybrid Isfahani style continued at regional centers like Shiraz after the fall of the Safavid state. Painters active in the style included Mohammad-Ali ibn Mohammad Zaman (Note: son of Muhammad Zaman) and Mohammad-Ali ibn Abdu'l Naaisha's Ibn Ali-Quli Jubbadar. (Note: grandson of Aliquli Jabbadar)

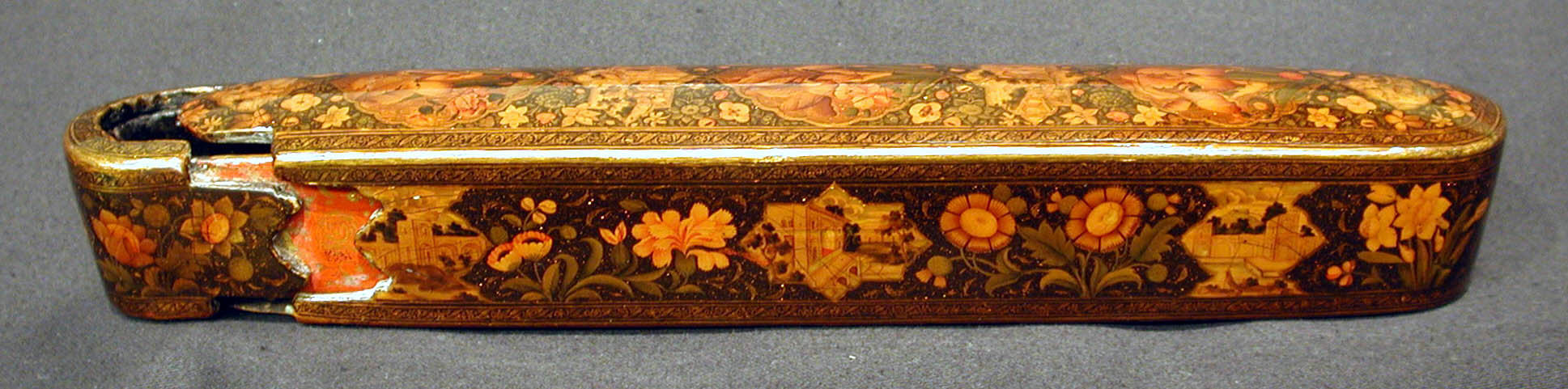
Pen Box with Architectural Cartouches. Signed 'Ali Ashraf, 1156 AH/1743–44 CE. Met Museum.

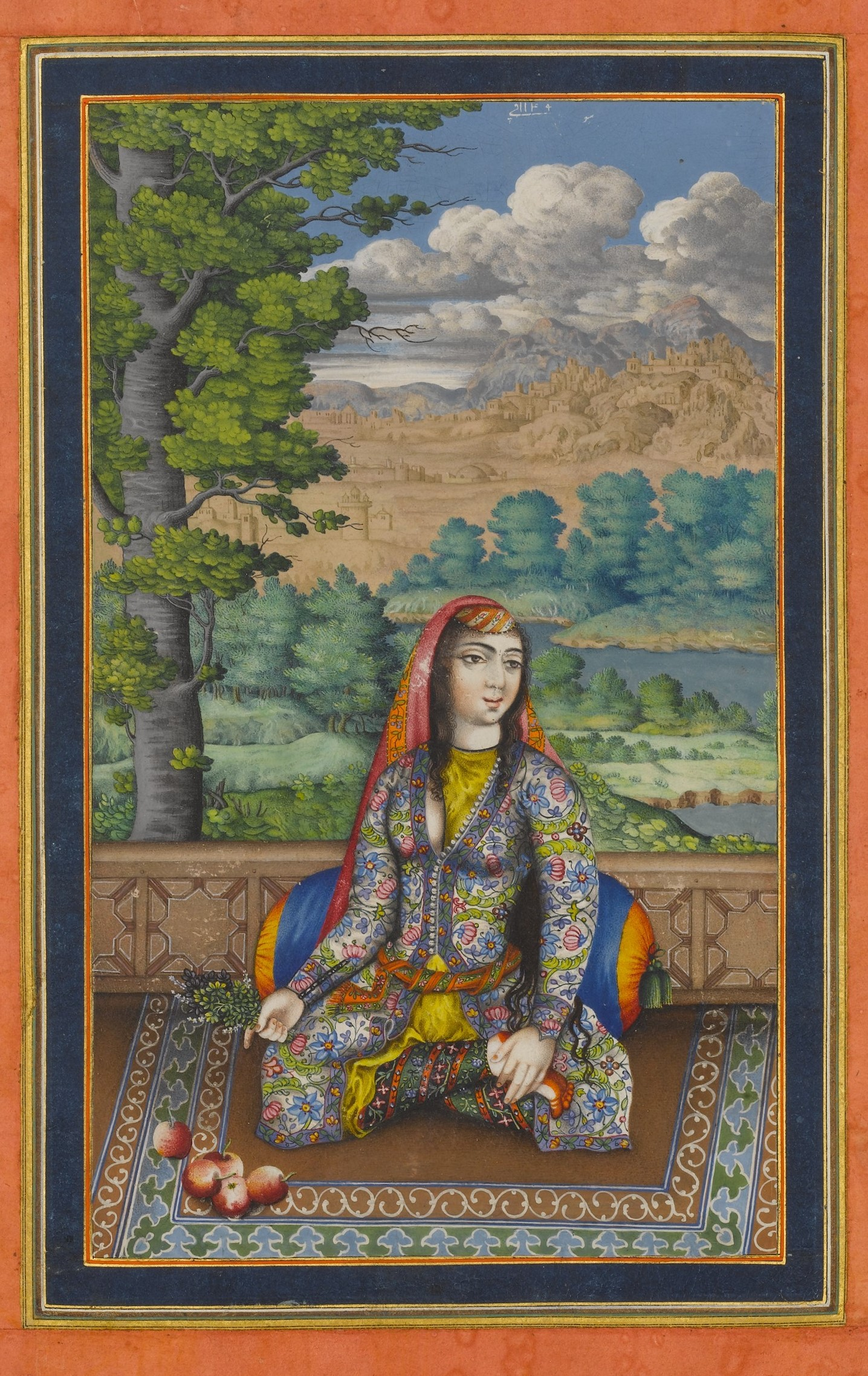
"Portrait of a Persian Lady", Folio from the Davis Album. Afsharid era dated 1149 AH/1736–37 CE. Met Museum

The style also survived in Afsharid and Zand era lacquer paintings like those of 'Ali Ashraf. 'Ali Ashraf had studied under Mohammad Zaman, and his designs bring to mind his teacher's treatment of flowers, which was further developed in the early Qajar era by Mohammad Hadi. Mohammad Sadiq, another painter who sometimes worked on lacquer, is also known for miniatures in the Europeanizing manner and for oil paintings in Negarestan Palace. Some credit to him the genre of portraiture that would define early Qajar court art decades later.

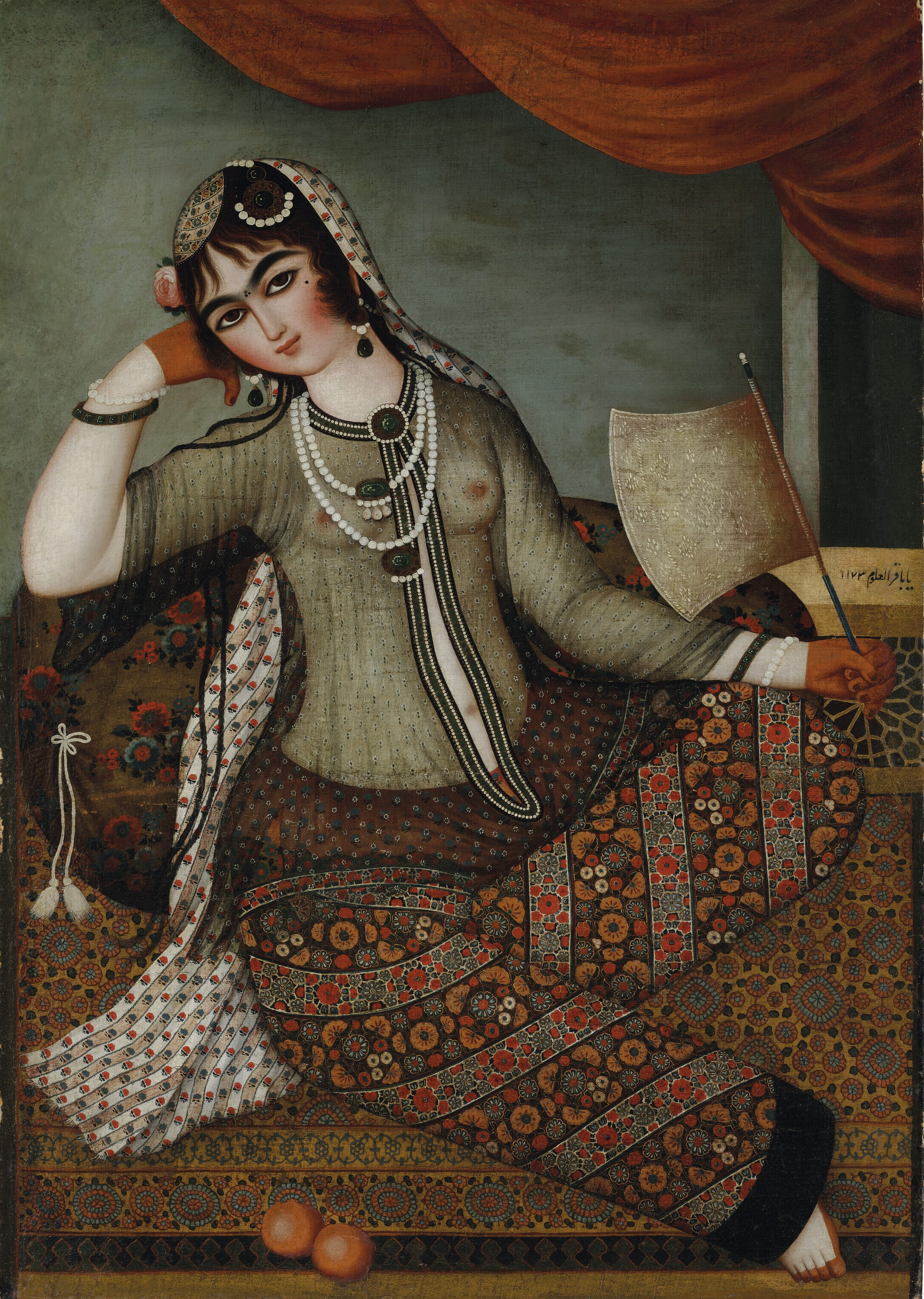
A Reclining Beauty by Mohammad Baqer. Zand era dated c. 1759/60, oil on canvas.

Album production reflected this continued interest in foreign styles. In the Afsharid era St. Petersburg Muraqqa, freshly looted Mughal and Deccan miniatures (some of them Europeanizing) were placed alongside European prints and Safavid Farangi-sazi (Note: These practices can also be seen in smaller (but even more eclectic) albums like Dorn 489.) and framed with lavish decorative borders. Mohammad Baqir was one of the artists who worked on these borders; his floral decorations in the Europeanized Indo-Persian style are especially striking. Mohammad Baqir's work also included copies of European prints, copies of older Farangi-sazi, and oil-on-canvas portraits. (Note: A (different?) Mohammad Baqir was also involved in enamel painting in the early Qajar era. See this bowl inscribed with his name in the Ashmolean Museum)

=== Precedents ===
The Diez and Fatih Albums contain a few 14th/15th century Jalayirid or Timurid pieces inscribed as "kar-i-farang", possibly based on medieval French or Iberian models.

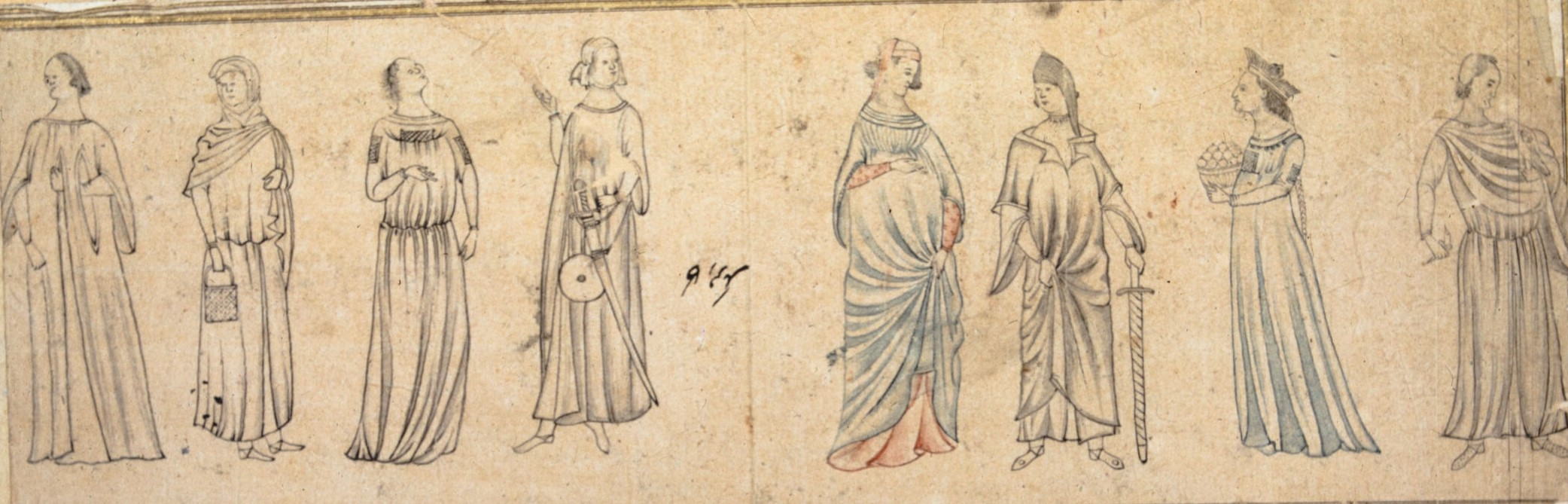
Ink & wash drawing of 8 figures in late 14th century European costume. Possibly made by a Jalayirid artist c. 1370 in Baghdad or Tabriz and inserted later into the Fatih Album

The farangi manner's reputation for naturalism persisted through the Timurid era. (Note: For an early 15th century example from Samarkand or Herat cited by Necipoglu in her article, see Diez fol 71, p 64 no 2.png - Wikipedia. Also note this 15th century Timurid drawing of the Hellenistic Tazza Farnese, which Necipoglu includes in her article on kar-i-farang even if its source material cannot be called "Farangi".) (Note: Arras tapestries in Bayezid I's collection were taken to Samarkand after the Battle of Ankara, and chronicler Ibn Arabshah commented enthusiastically on their naturalism. See Necipoglu) The late Timurid poet Alisher Nava'i listed mastery of "farangi" and "khata'i" (Note: e.g. Chinese ("Cathayan")) styles as skills one could expect from an illuminator. Although these terms were well established in the early 15th century, their use was often imprecise and their styles confused. (Note: This imprecision could explain Abd al Razzaq Samarqandi's improbable reference to "naqsh-i farangī va khaṭāʾī" in a Hindu temple in Southern India. (This is mentioned in the Necipoglu article) It is also reflected in inscriptions misattributing Chinese/Sinicizing drawings to the "farangi" style; one example named in the Necipoglu article is this painting of two Daoist immortals (zoom in, bottom right))

European folios from the mid-16th century Bahram Mirza album (Topkapi H. 2154), compiled in Safavid Tabriz, provide another glimpse into the reception of Western European art before the 17th century.

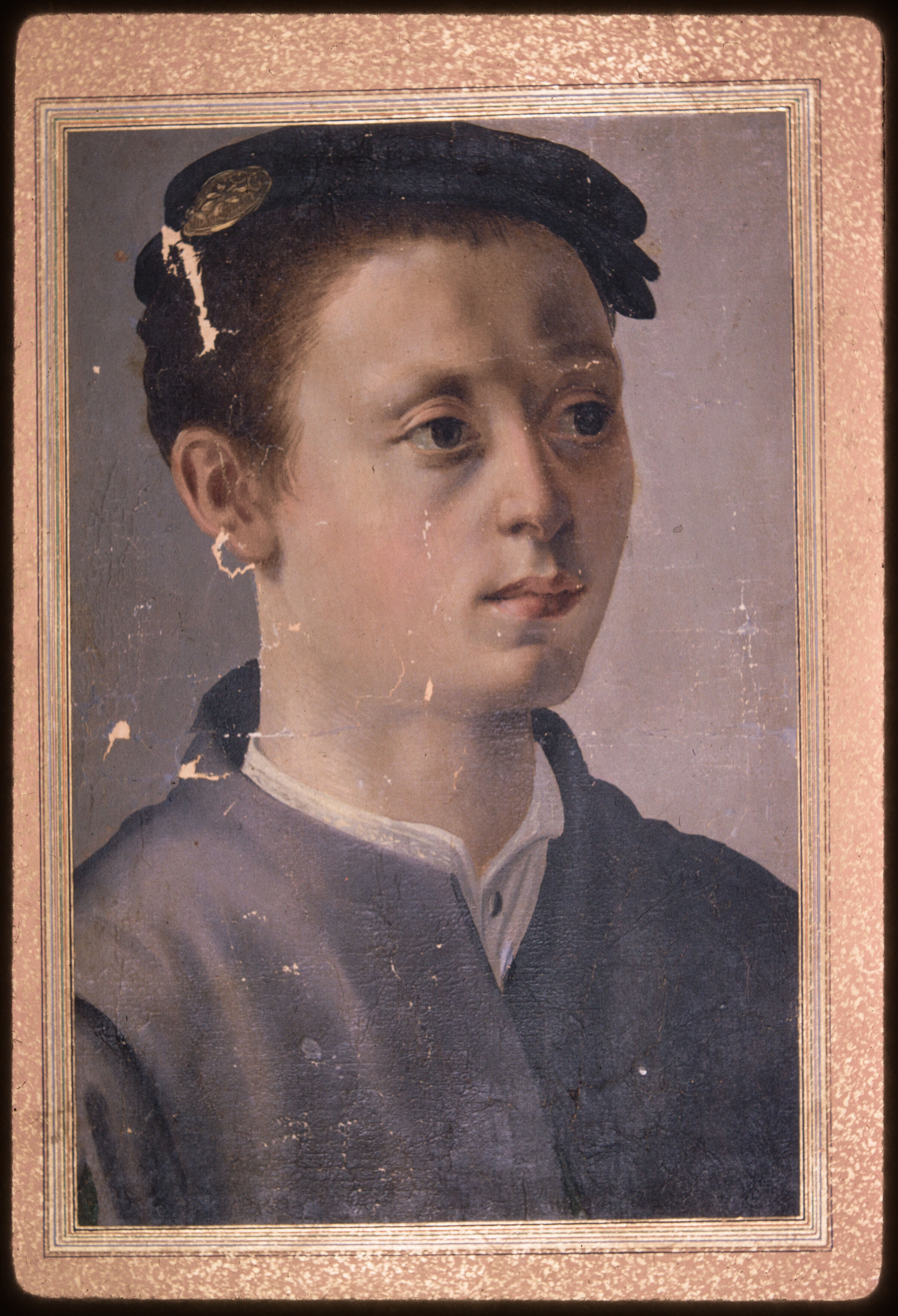
Bahram Mirza Album, folio 115a. Painting after Bronzino, ca. 1540 on Florentine or Venetian paper.

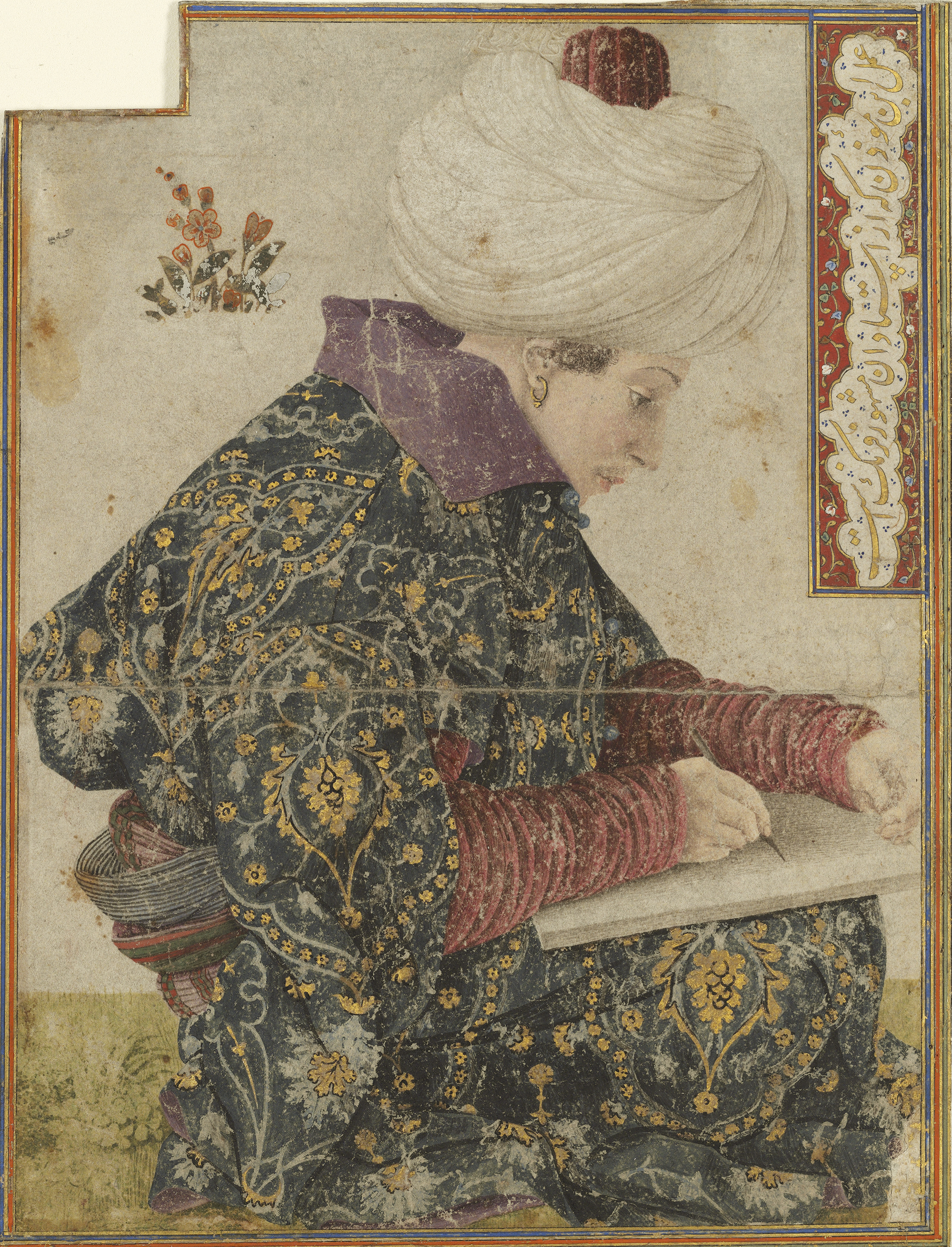
Seated scribe often associated w. Gentile Bellini's Istanbul period. Probably sent to Aq Qoyunlu Tabriz; later incorporated into the Bahram Mirza Album

=== The Indian connection ===
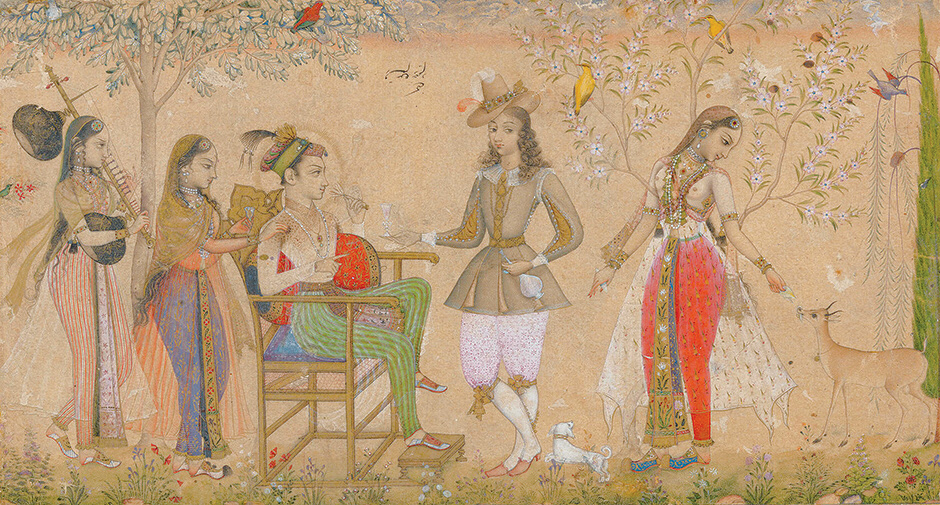
Painting by Rahim Deccani. He possibly moved in the late 17th century from Golconda to Iran, where lacquer paintings by him could be found in the 19th century

European artistic influences may also have arrived by way of Mughal and Deccan India.

The styles of Bahram Sofrakesh and Shaykh Abbasi reflect this influence explicitly, and Aliquli Jabbadar may have produced copies of early 17th century Mughal paintings. (Note: Including works by (or attributed to) Govardhan, Payag, and Manohar. For details, see the descriptions here: https://www.christies.com/en/lot/lot-6099293 https://www.sothebys.com/en/buy/auction/2023/arts-of-the-islamic/majnun-or-a-wandering-dervish-attributed-to For examples: https://www.khalilicollections.org/collections/islamic-art/khalili-collection-islamic-art-album-page-with-an-indian-fakir-mss-1004/ https://www.bonhams.com/auction/18950/lot/41/an-astrologer-with-holy-men-at-a-hermitage-attributed-to-ali-quli-jabbadar-fl-late-17th-early-18th-century-after-the-mughal-artist-govardhan-isfahan-late-17th-century/ https://www.agakhanmuseum.org/collection/artifact/group-sages-discussion-akm186)

Indian influence also contributed to the maturation of the gol-o-morg genre in the mid-17th century under painters like Shafi Abbasi. Related was a new genre of floral studies which took cues from Mughal European-influenced (Note: See https://blogs.bl.uk/asian-and-african/2014/03/mughal-flower-studies-and-their-european-inspiration.html) models.

Decades later, the campaigns of Nader Shah brought many looted Mughal and Deccan miniatures to Iran, (Note: See also Gulshan Album) where they were installed in muraqqas like the Davis and St. Petersburg Albums. Some miniatures may have been overpainted in Iran in the Persian Europeanizing style.

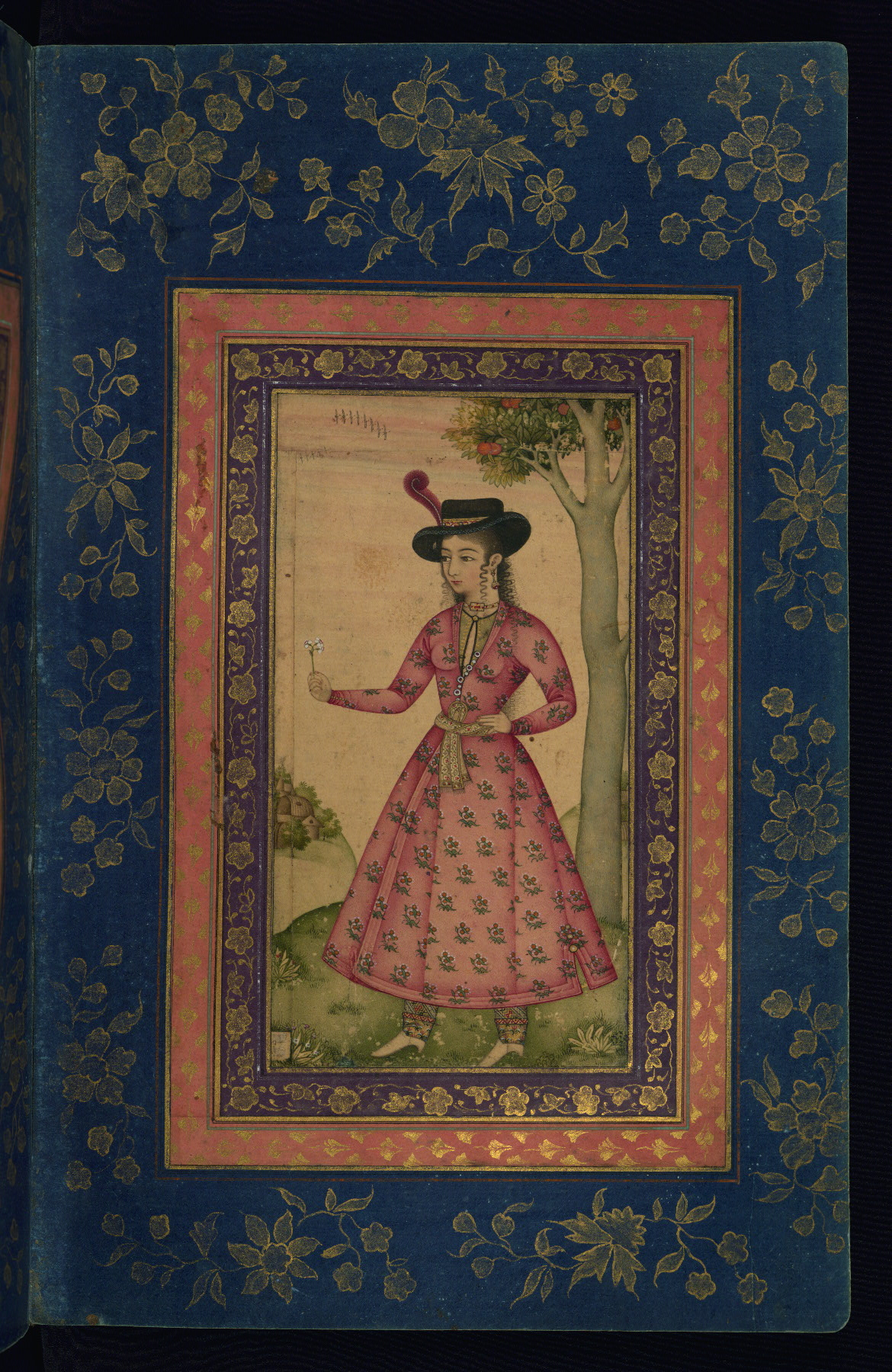
Woman in a European hat holding a flower, fol. 18b from the Walters Ms. W.668. Shaykh Abbasi?

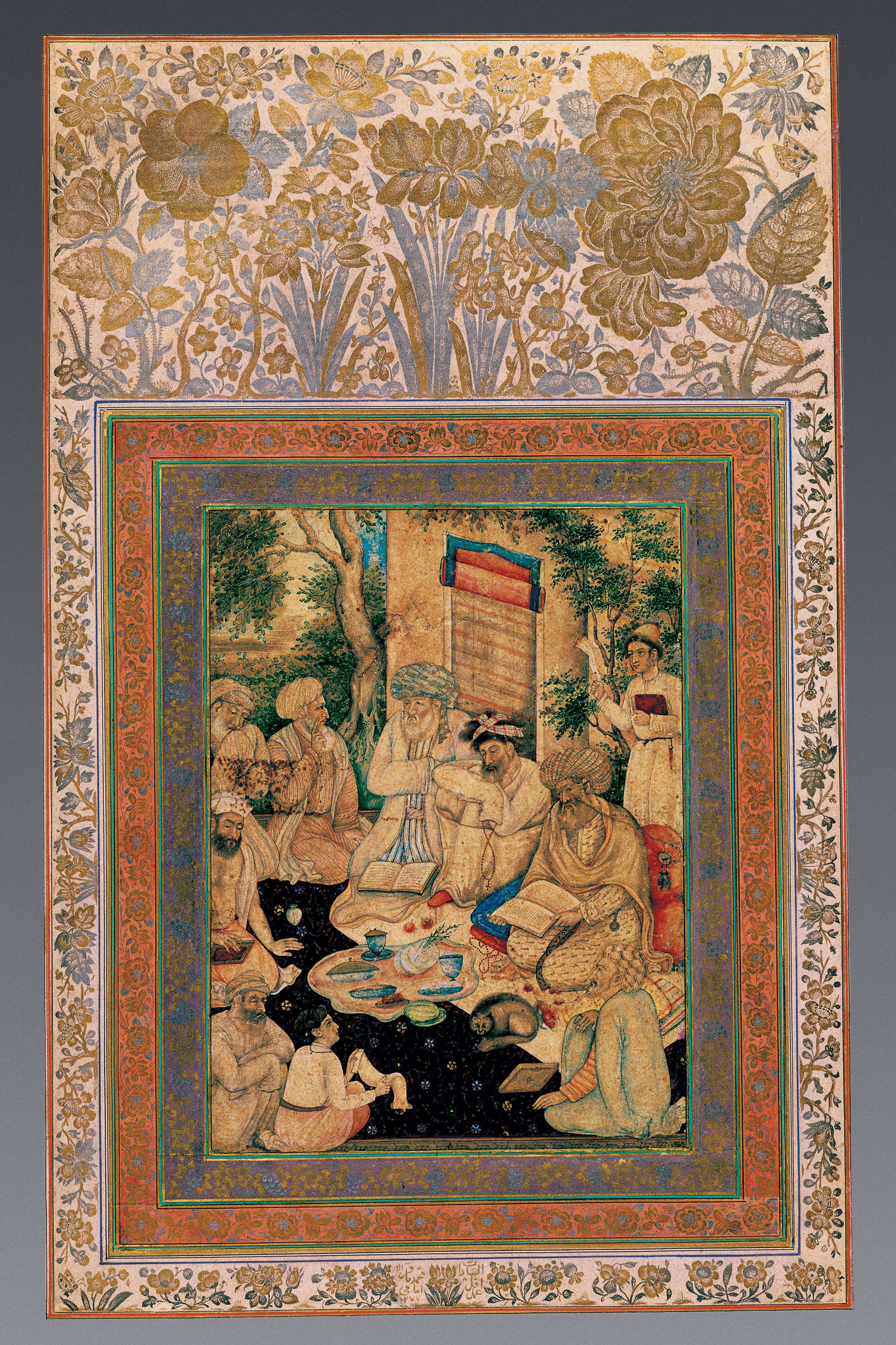
Group of sages in discussion. Aliquli Jabbadar, after Manohar (?). Aga Khan Museum, AKM186.

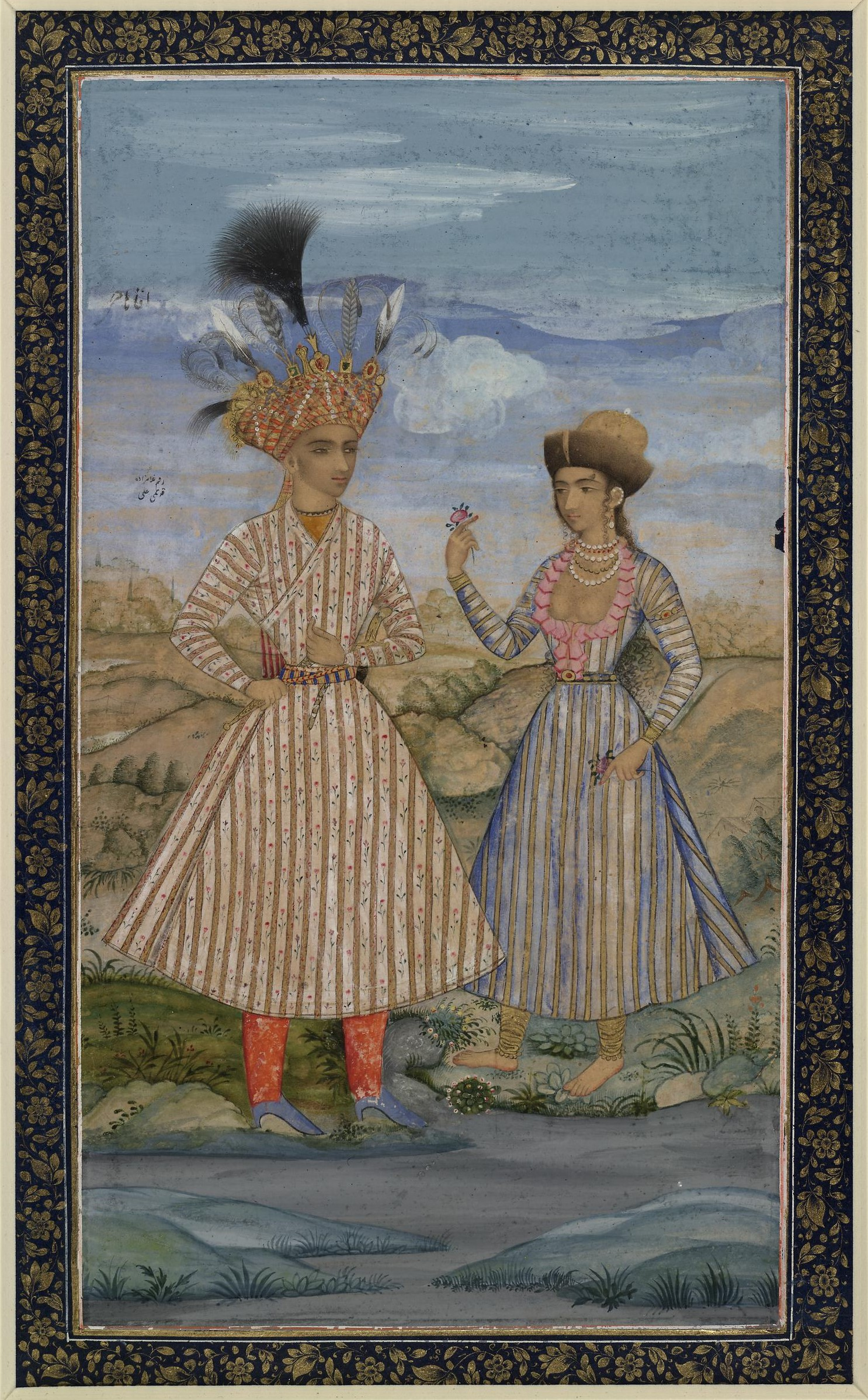
Lady offering a flower to a prince. Aliquli Jabbadar, ca 1660–70. British Museum. According to the object listing, the treatment of faces continues developments made by Shaykh Abbasi.

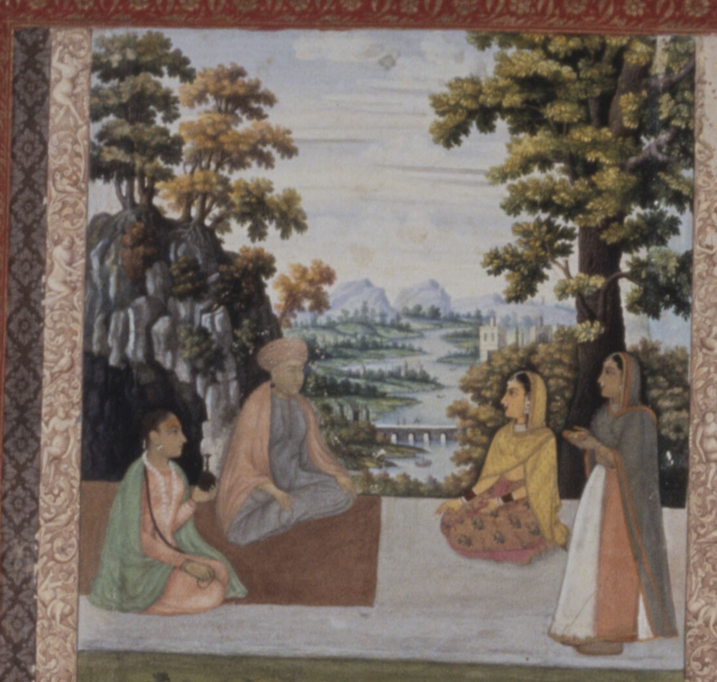
Ladies visiting a sage. Mughal, late 1600s. St. Petersburg Album. Per S.C. Welch, the landscape was added in Isfahan in Mohammad Zaman's style

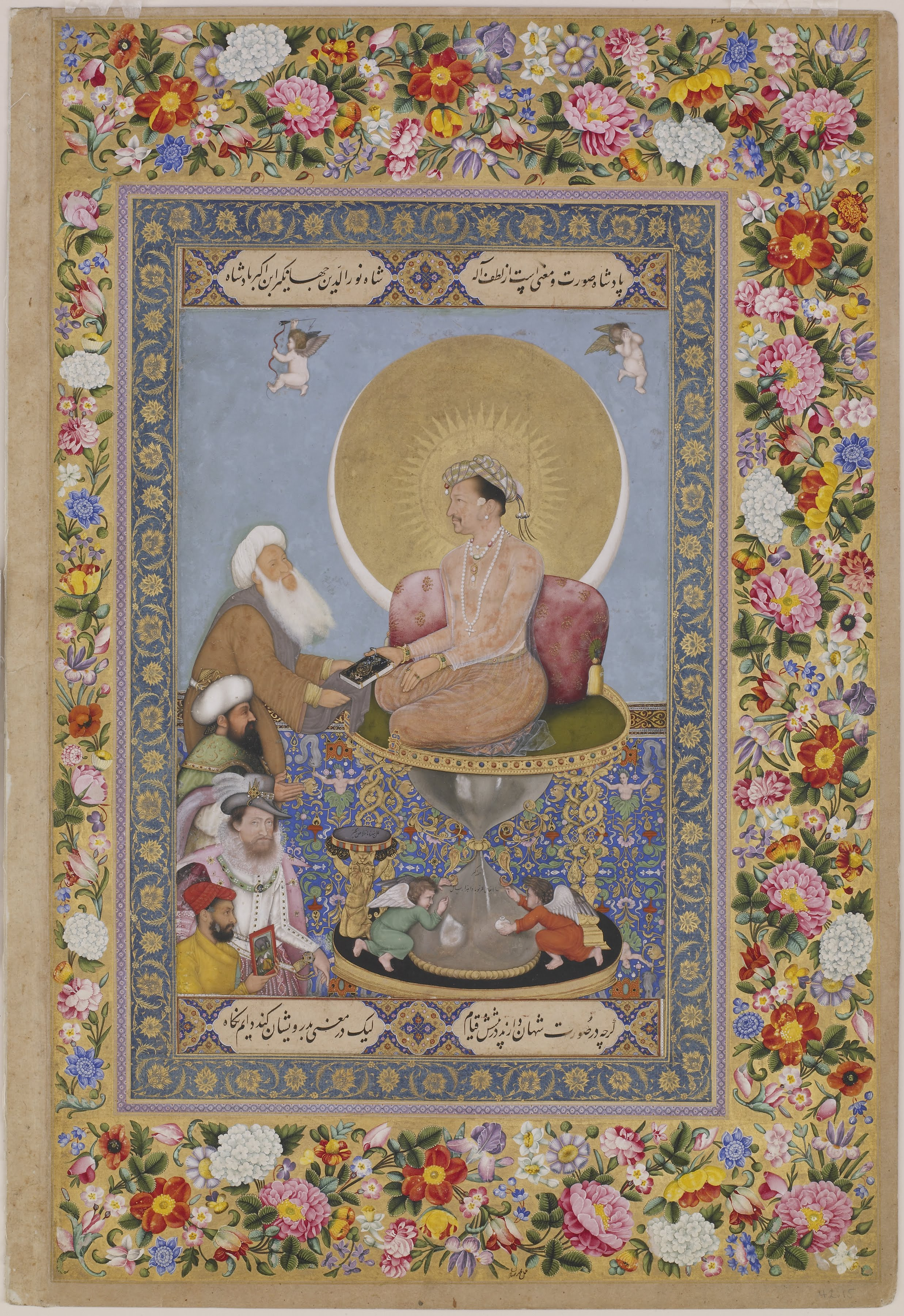
Jahangir Preferring a Sufi Shaikh to Kings. Painting by Bichitr, India ca. 1615–18. Floral margins added in Iran 1747/48 by Mohammad Sadiq. Formerly part of the St. Petersburg Album

== Gallery ==
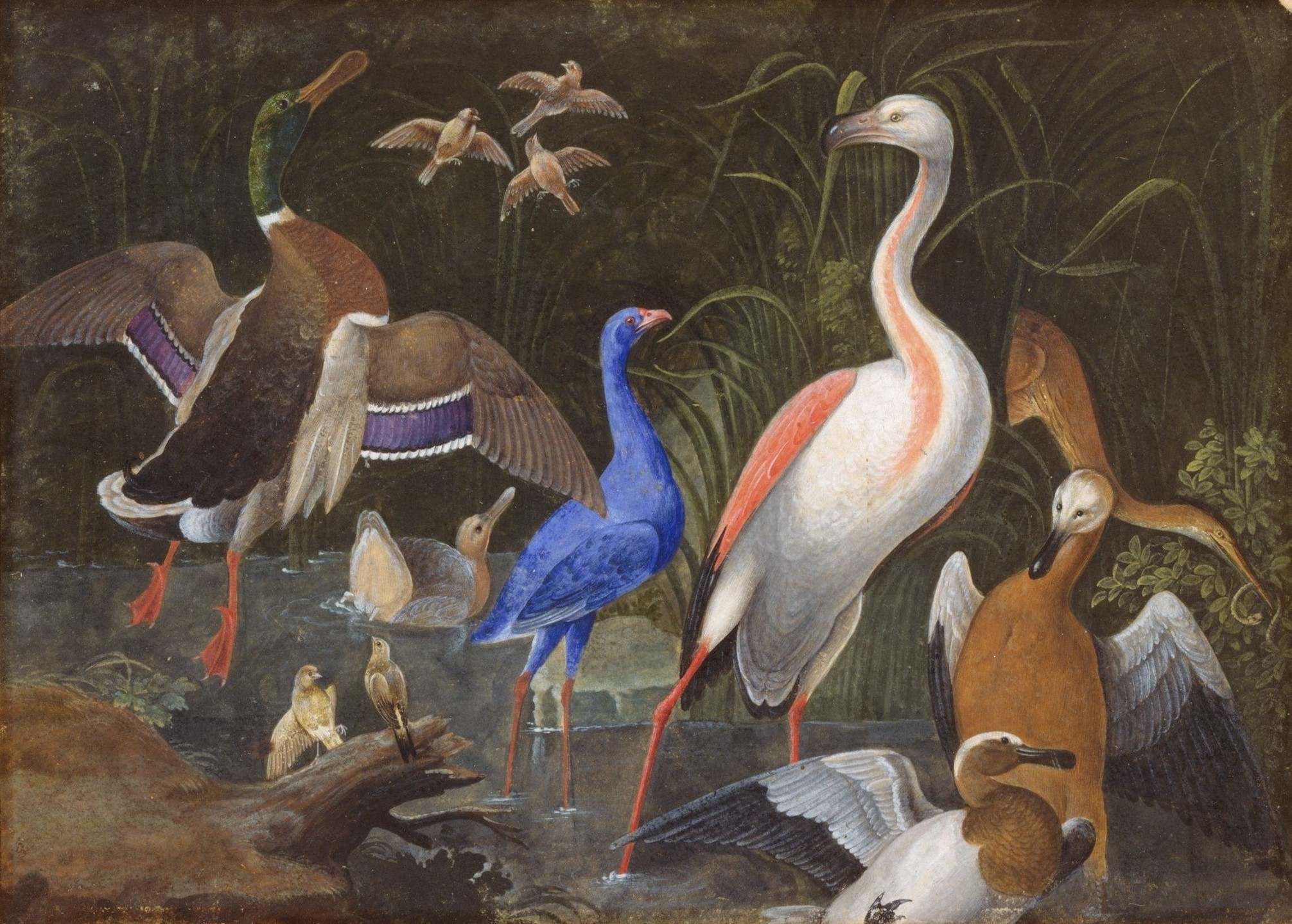
Aquatic Birds at a Pool, folio from the Davis Album. Late 1600s-early 1700s. According to the object listing, possibly by Aliquli Jabbadar. Met Museum

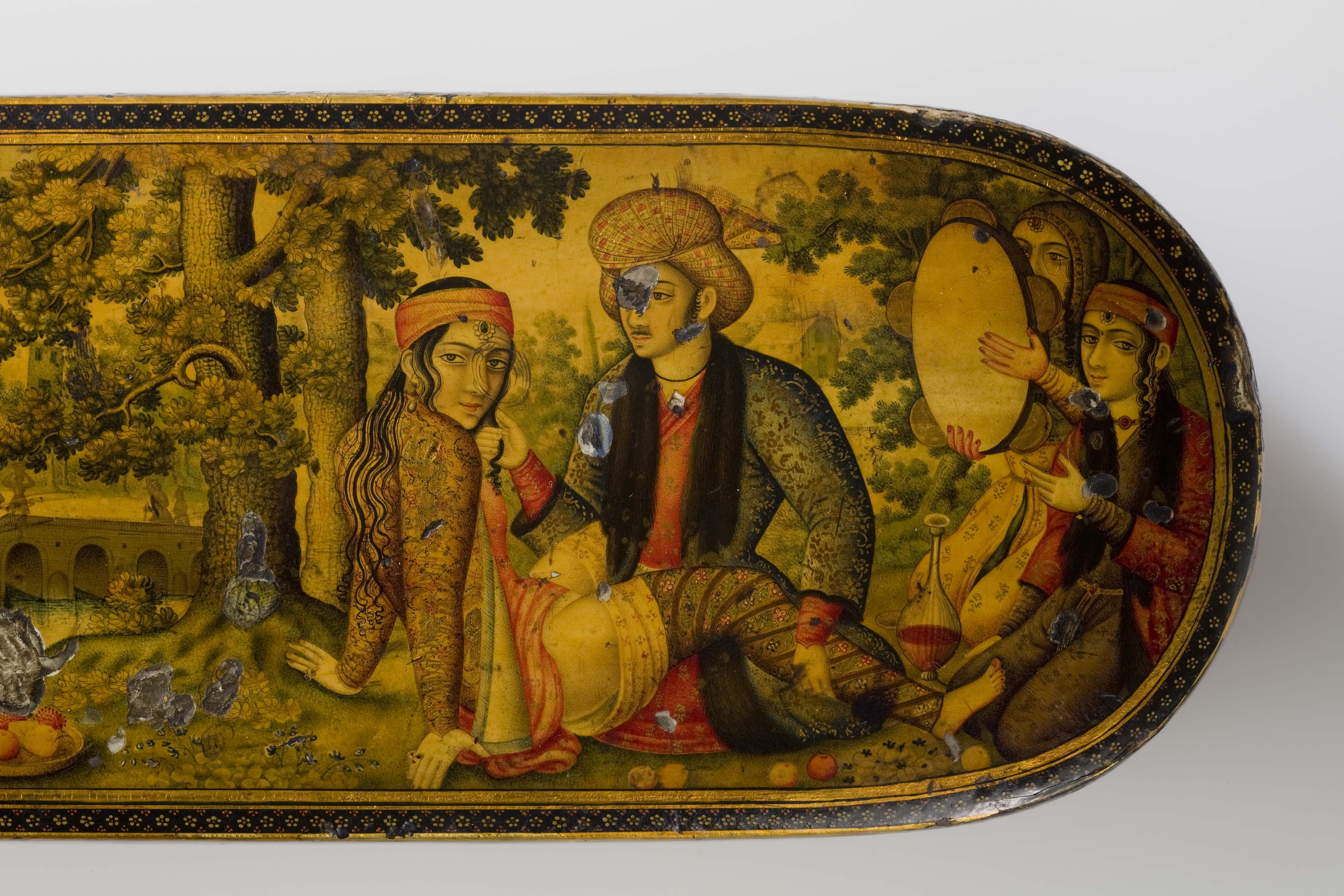
Lacquer pen box painted in Mohammad Zaman's style. Signed Haji Mohammad, (Note: The object listing does not identify this Haji Mohammad as Mohammad Zaman's brother) 1124 AH (1712/13 AD). Khalili Collections

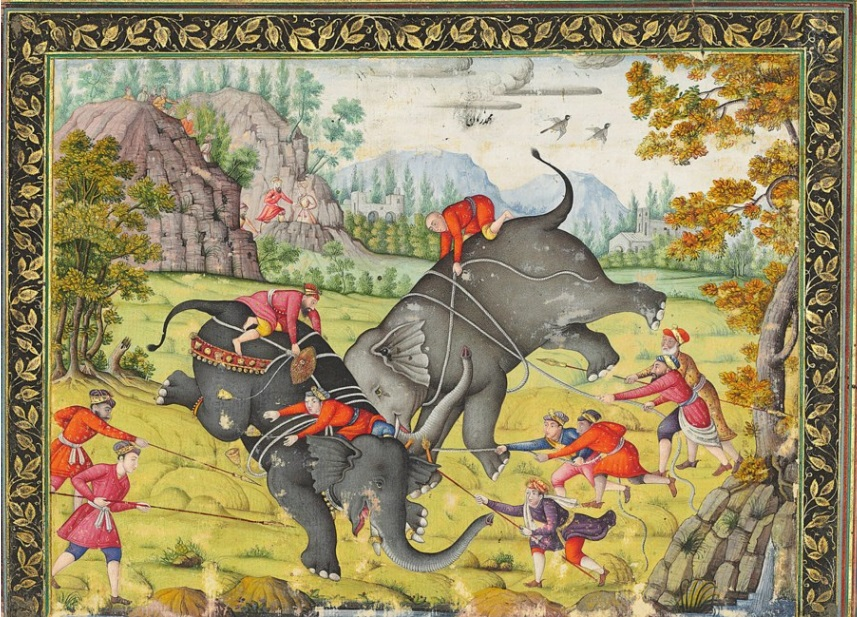
Rampaging elephants, Iran, late 17th-early 18th century. School of Mohammad Zaman.

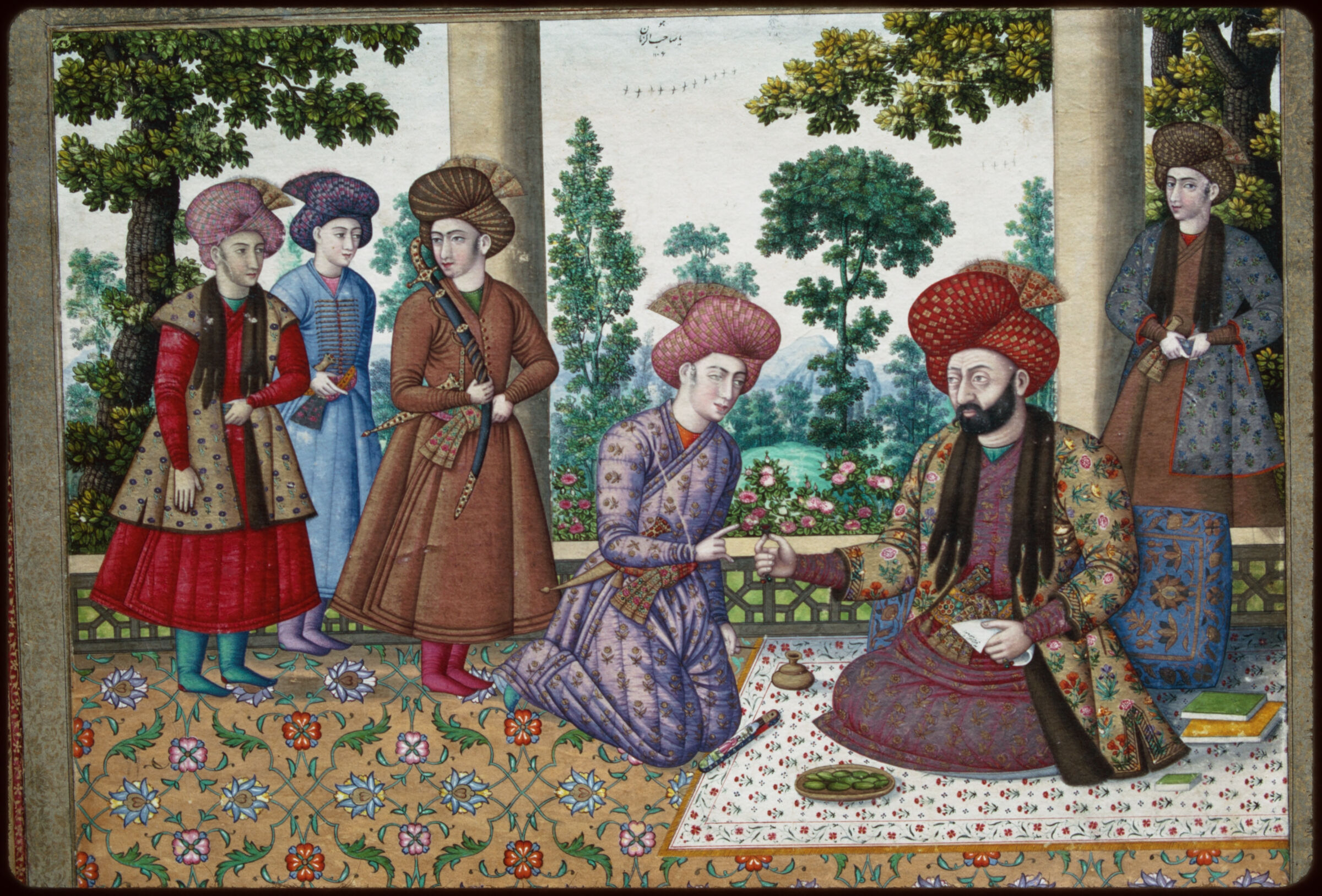
Grand vizier Shahqoli Khan Zanganeh presents a ring, 1694/95. Attribution contested; possibly Mohammad Soltani or Mohammad Zaman. St. Petersburg Muraqqa

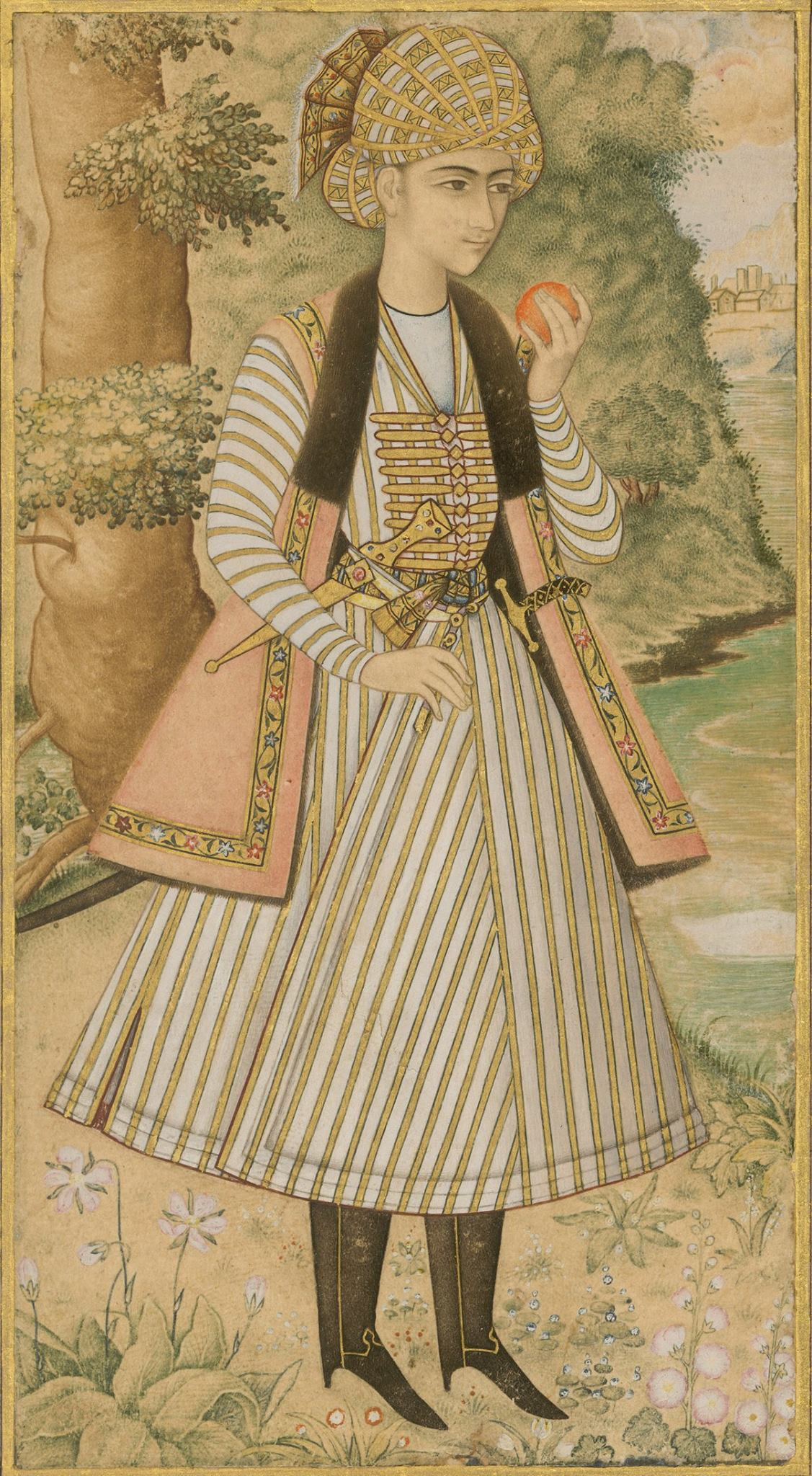
Portrait of a Princely Youth, late 17th century. Museum of Islamic Art, Doha. MIA.2014.453

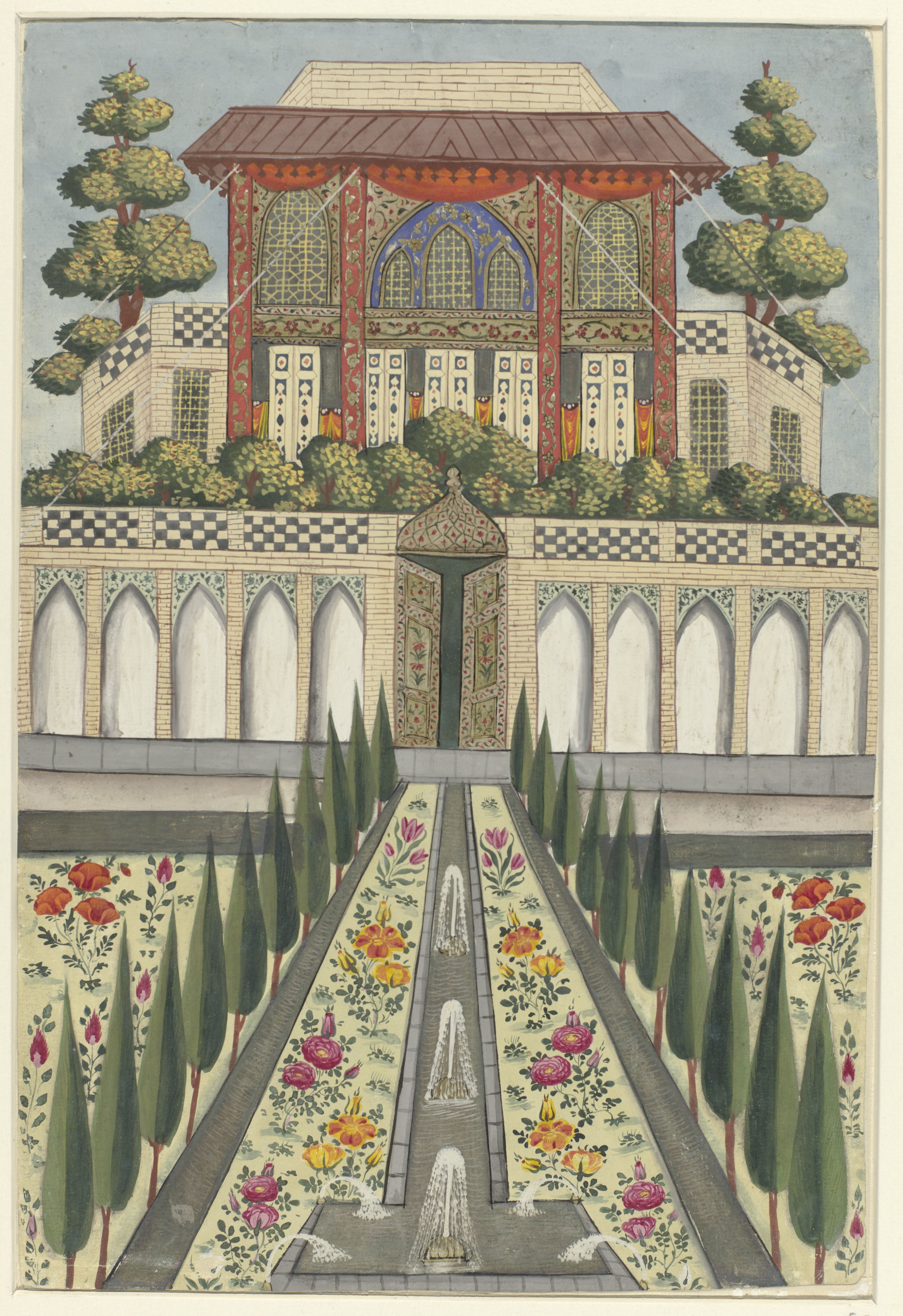
Palace Garden of Hazar Jarib in Aliabad, late 17th century. Commissioned by a Dutchman. Note perspective & treatment of trees. Rijksmuseum

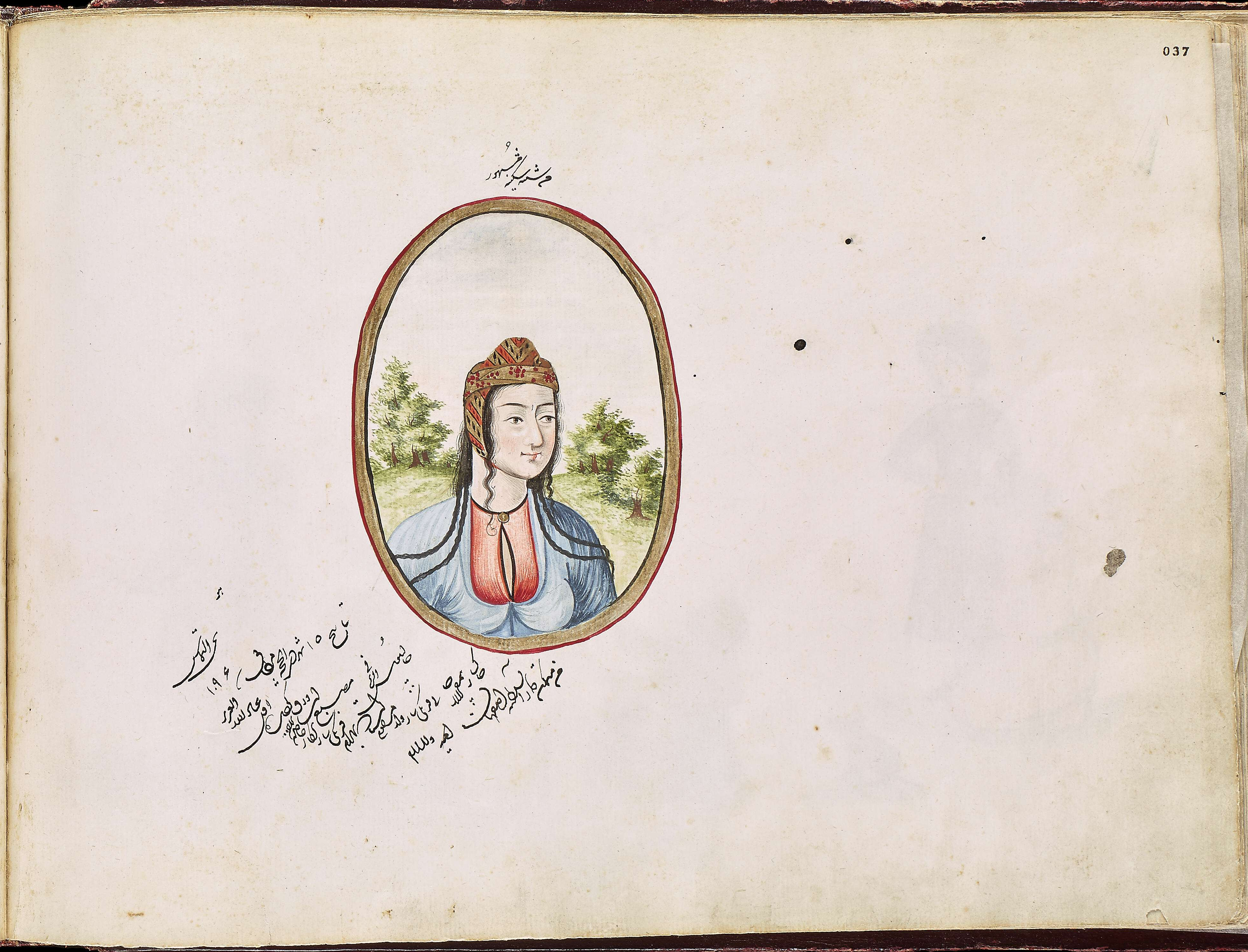
Portrait of Sakinah from Engelbert Kaempfer's costume album, 1684–85, with paintings by Jani "Farangi-saz". British Museum

=== Muhammad Zaman & Aliquli Jabbadar ===
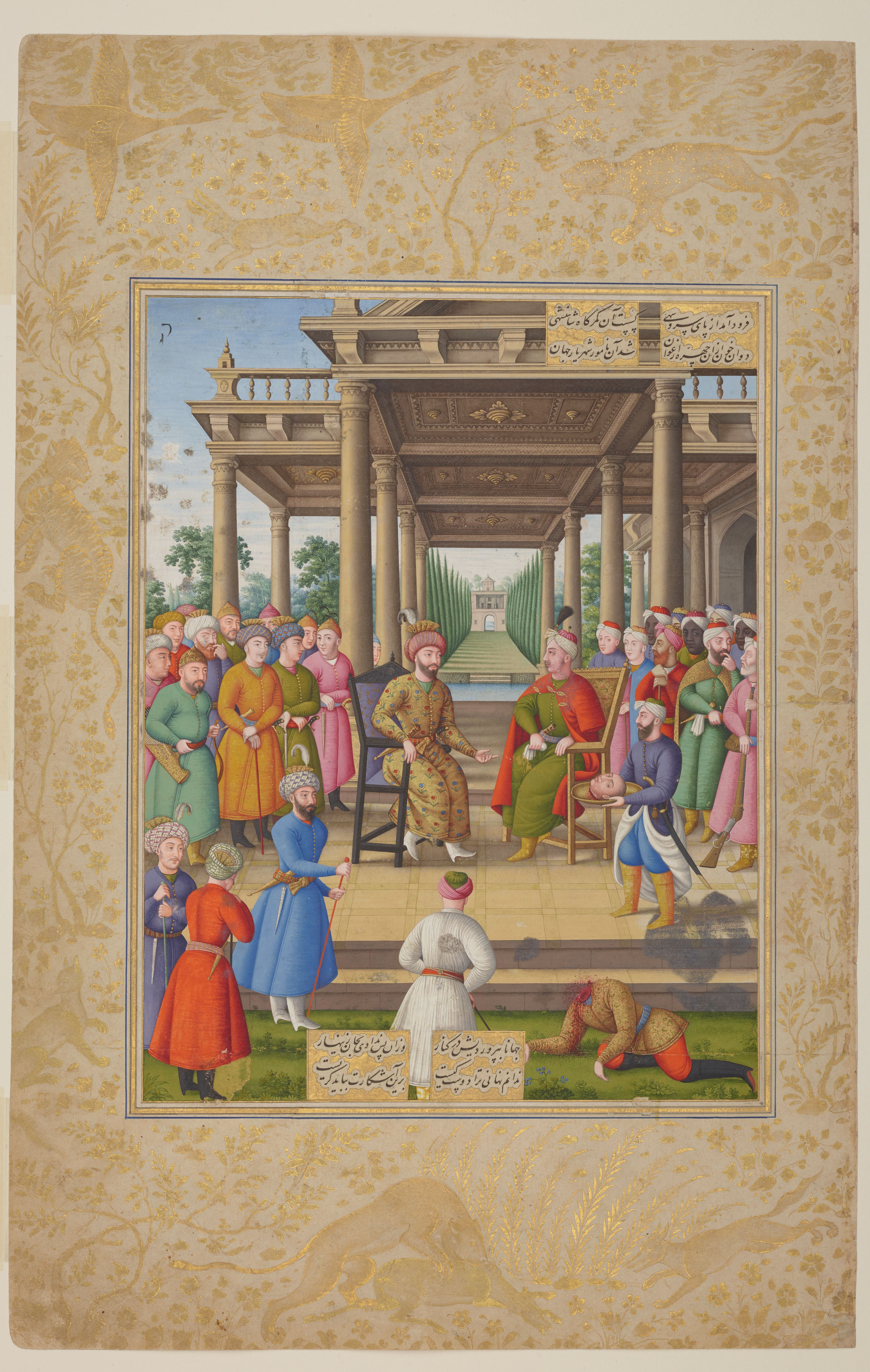
Salm and Tur order the murder of their brother Iraj. Mohammad Zaman. From the Shahnameh of Shah Abbas, 1675/76. Chester Beatty Library

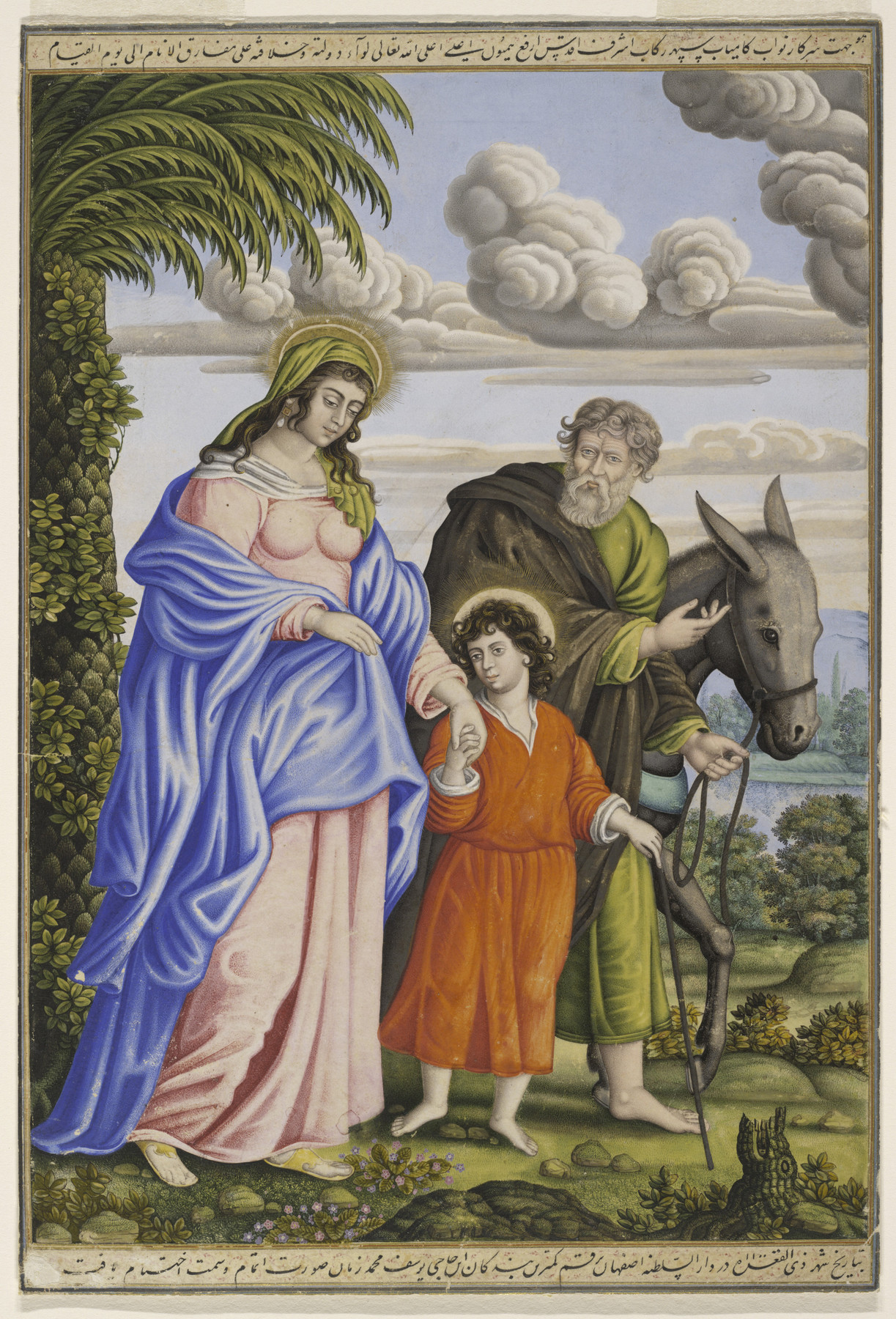
The Return from the Flight into Egypt, 1689. Mohammad Zaman. Harvard Art Museums. Based on a Lucas Vorsterman I engraving after Rubens

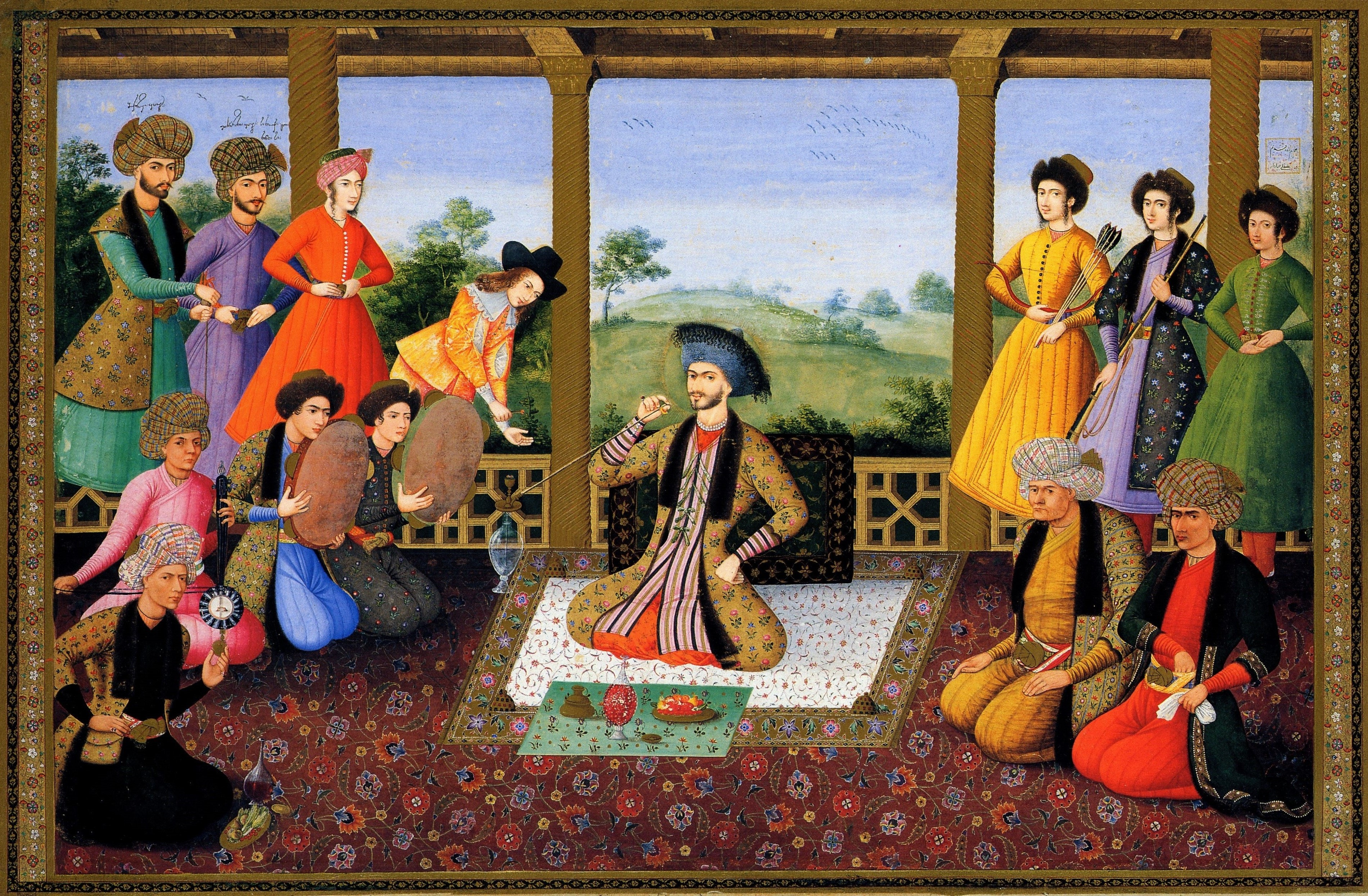
Shah (possibly Suleiman I) and courtiers. Aliquli Jabbadar, 1660s–70s. St. Petersburg Muraqqa, Fol. 98r

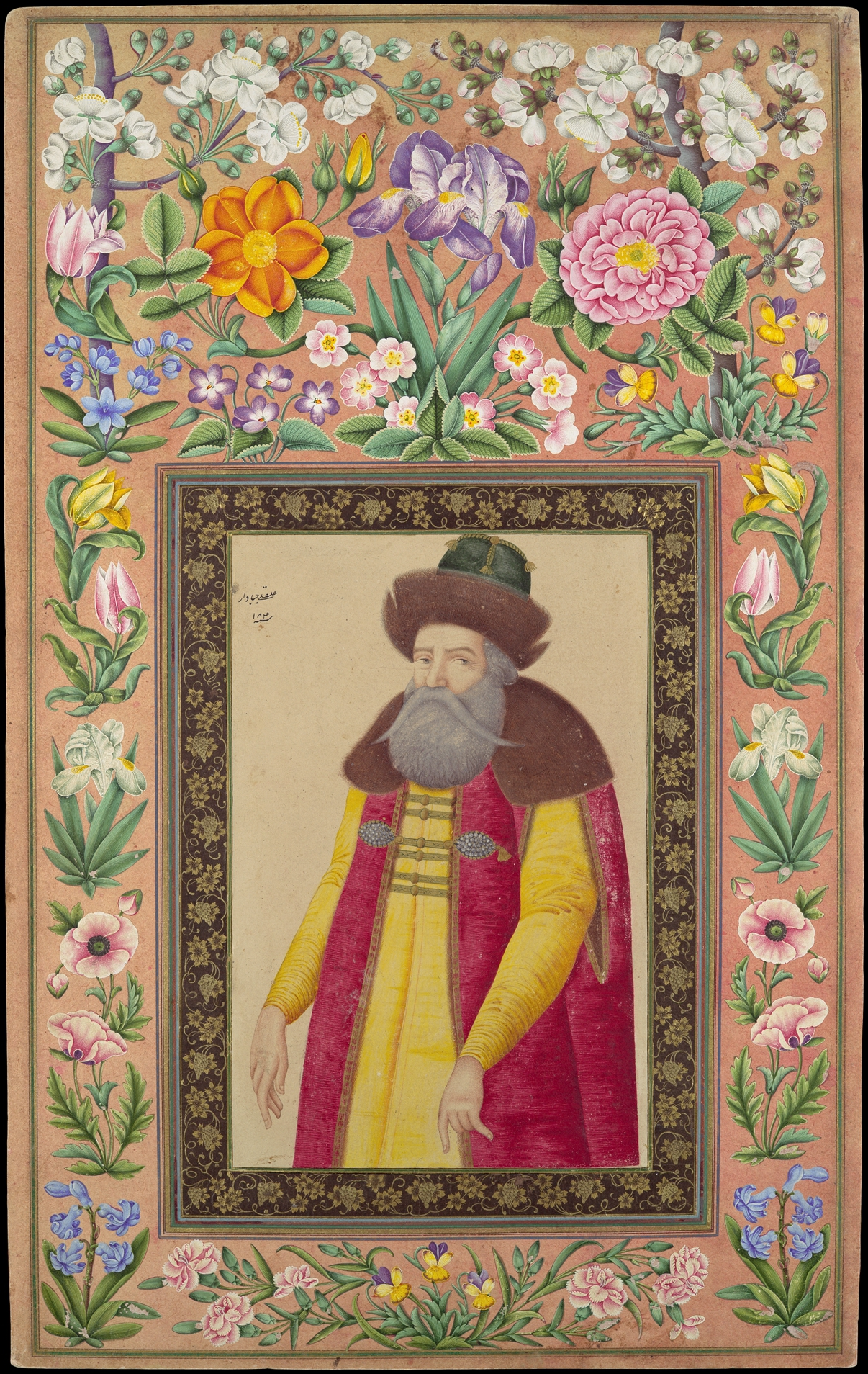
Portrait of the Russian Ambassador, Prince Andrey Priklonskiy. Aliquli Jabbadar. Folio from the Davis Album. Met Museum

=== Continuity and later developments ===
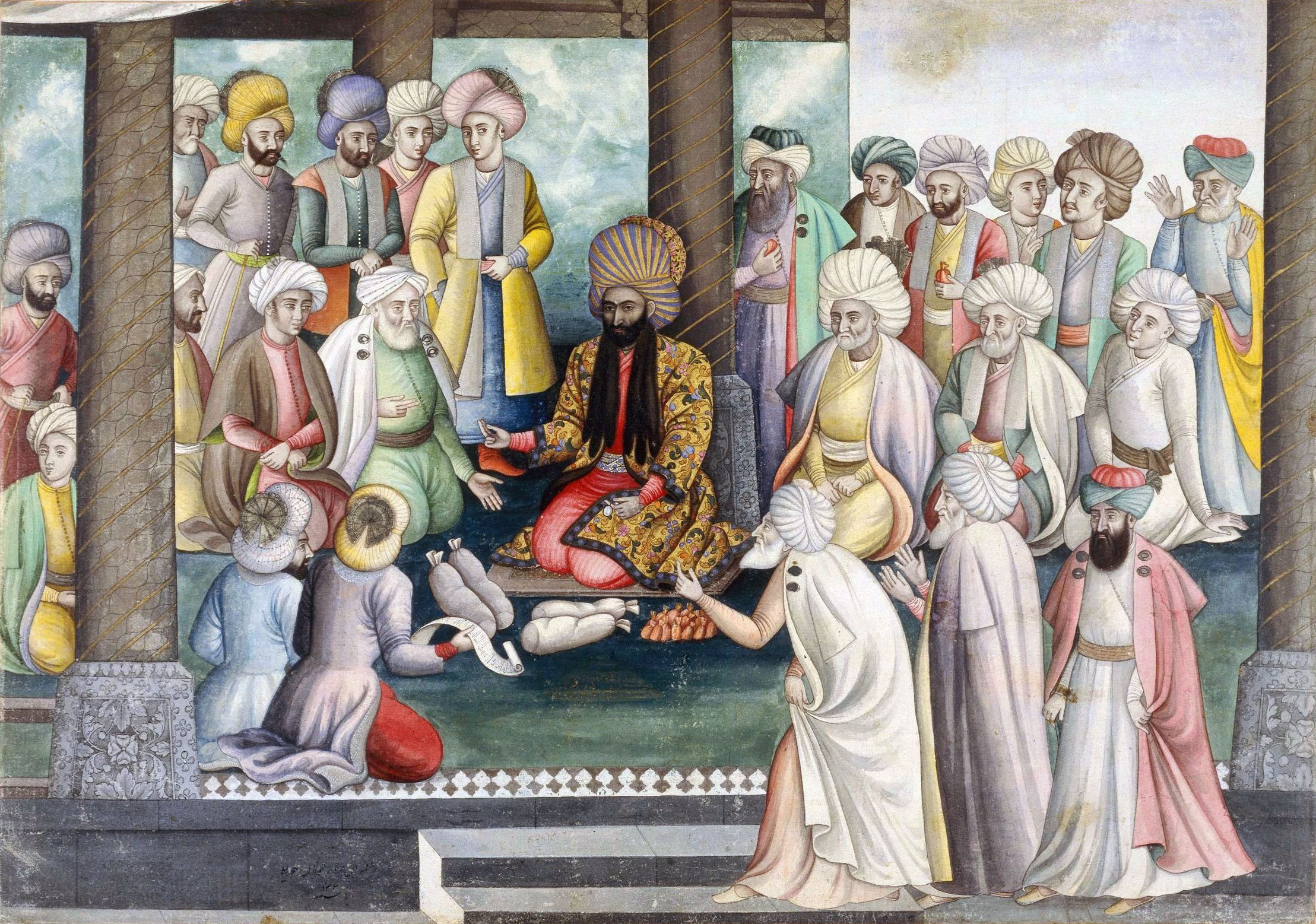
Shah Soltan Hoseyn Distributing New Year Presents. Painted by Mohammad Ali ibn Mohammad Zaman (son of Mohammad Zaman), 1720/21. British Museum

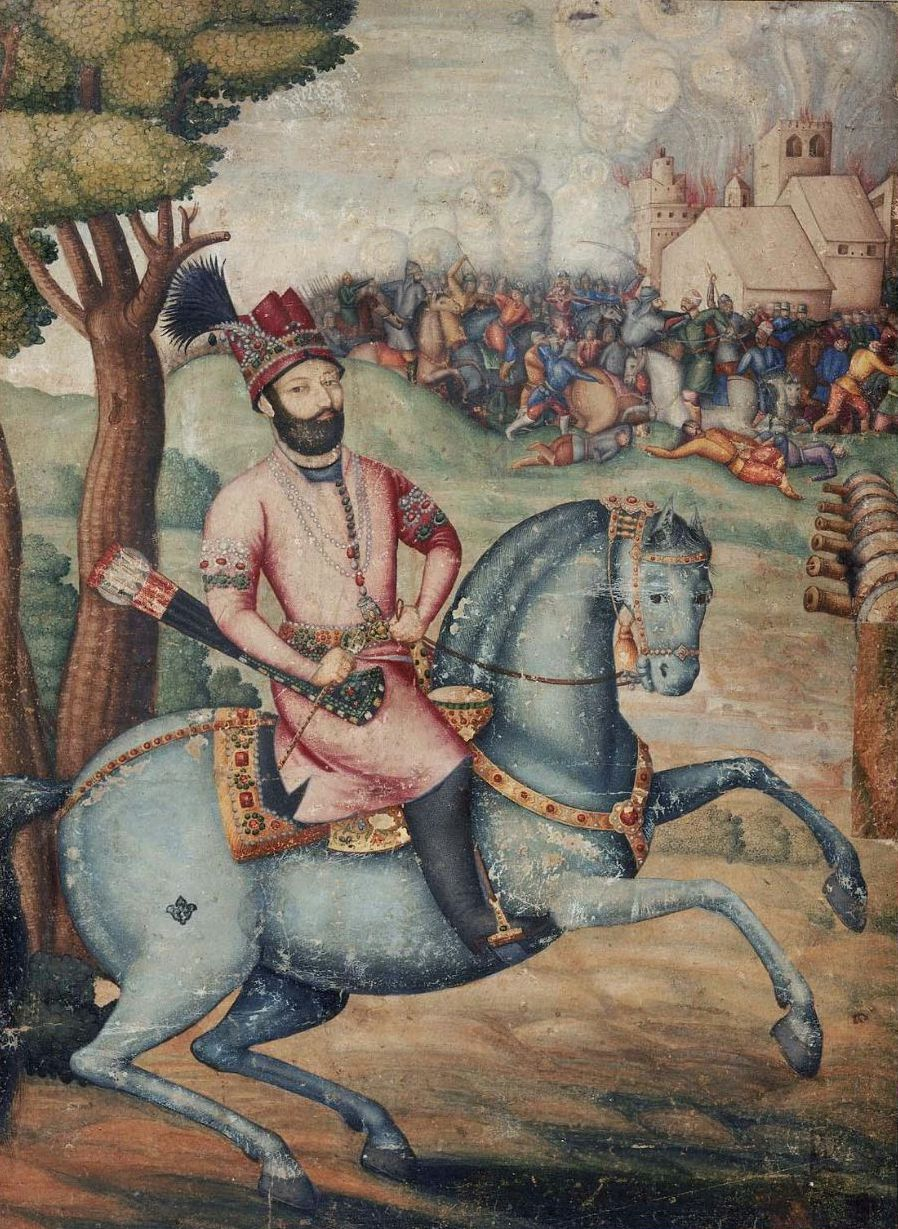
Equestrian portrait of Nader Shah, possibly by Muhammad Ali ibn Abd al-Bayg ibn Ali Quli Jabbadar (grandson of Aliquli Jabbadar). MFA Boston

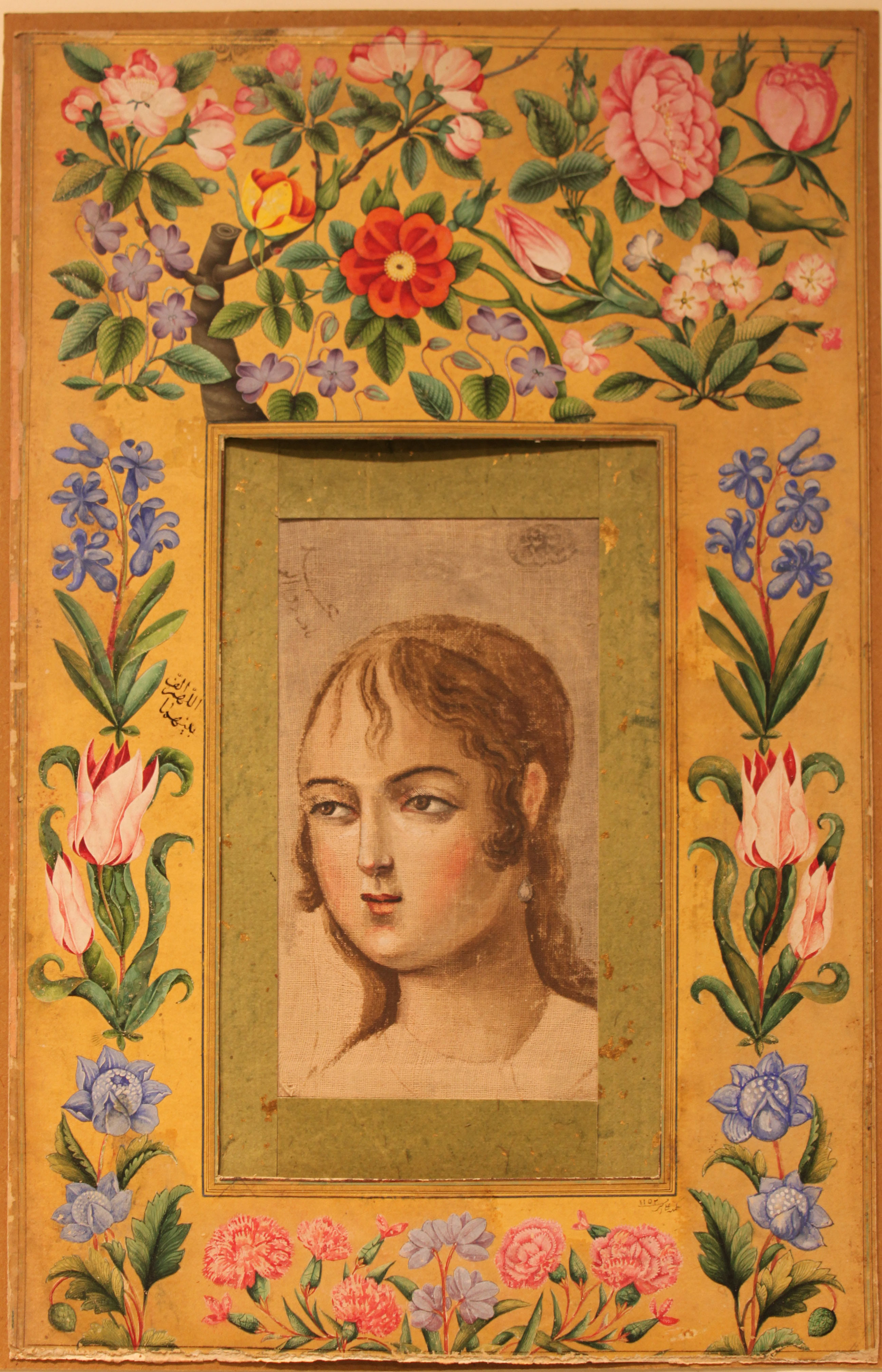
Painting of a Young Beauty by Mohammad Sadiq. Borders signed by 'Ali Akbar, A.H. 1152/A.D. 1739, another student of 'Ali Ashraf. Met Museum

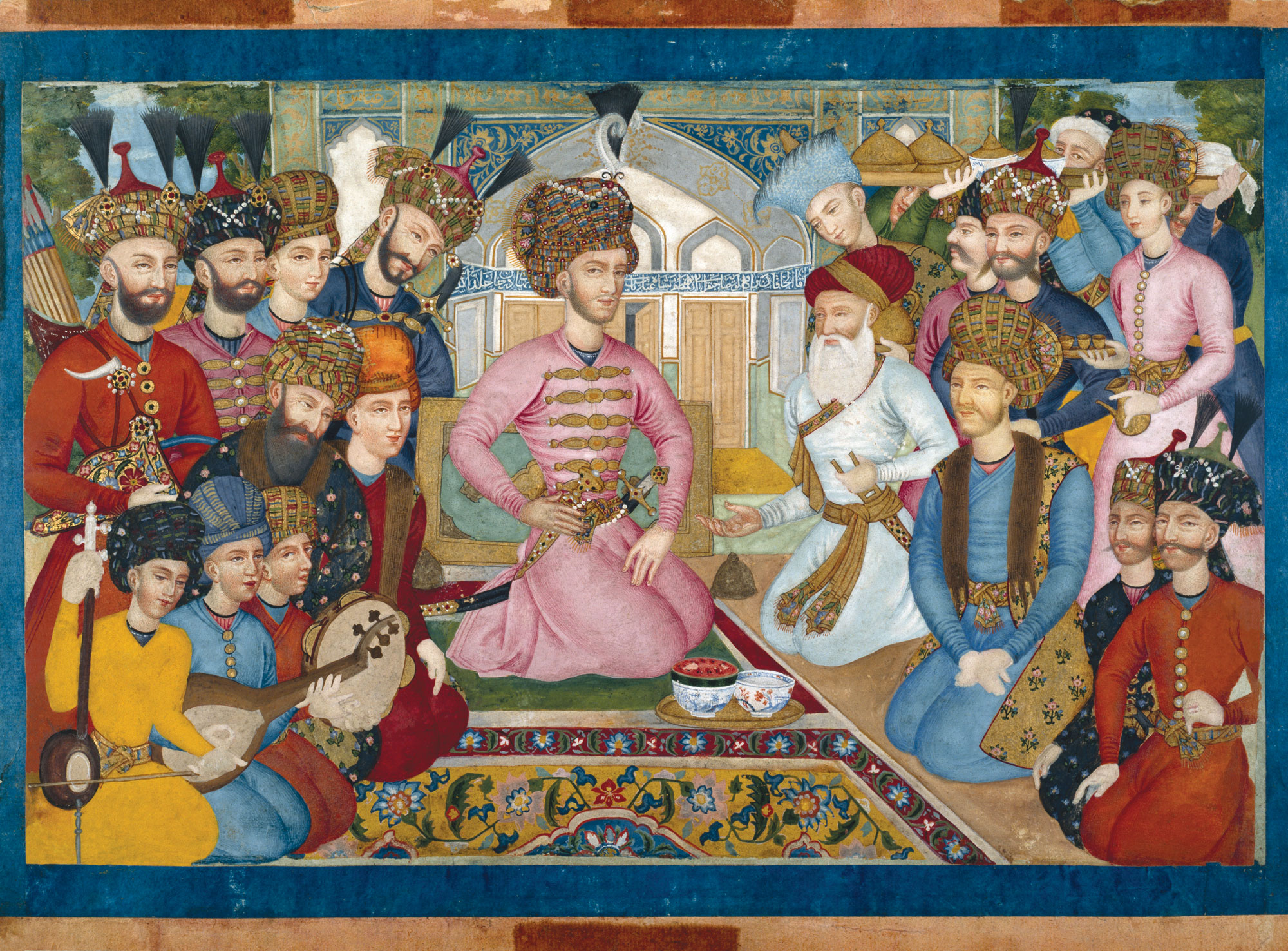
Abbas II & Mughal ambassador. Per Layla Diba, this was made by Abu'l-Hasan Mostawfi Ghaffari (Note: great-uncle of Sani al-Mulk) in the late 18th century. (Note: Dating and attribution contested)

==== Qajar legacy ====
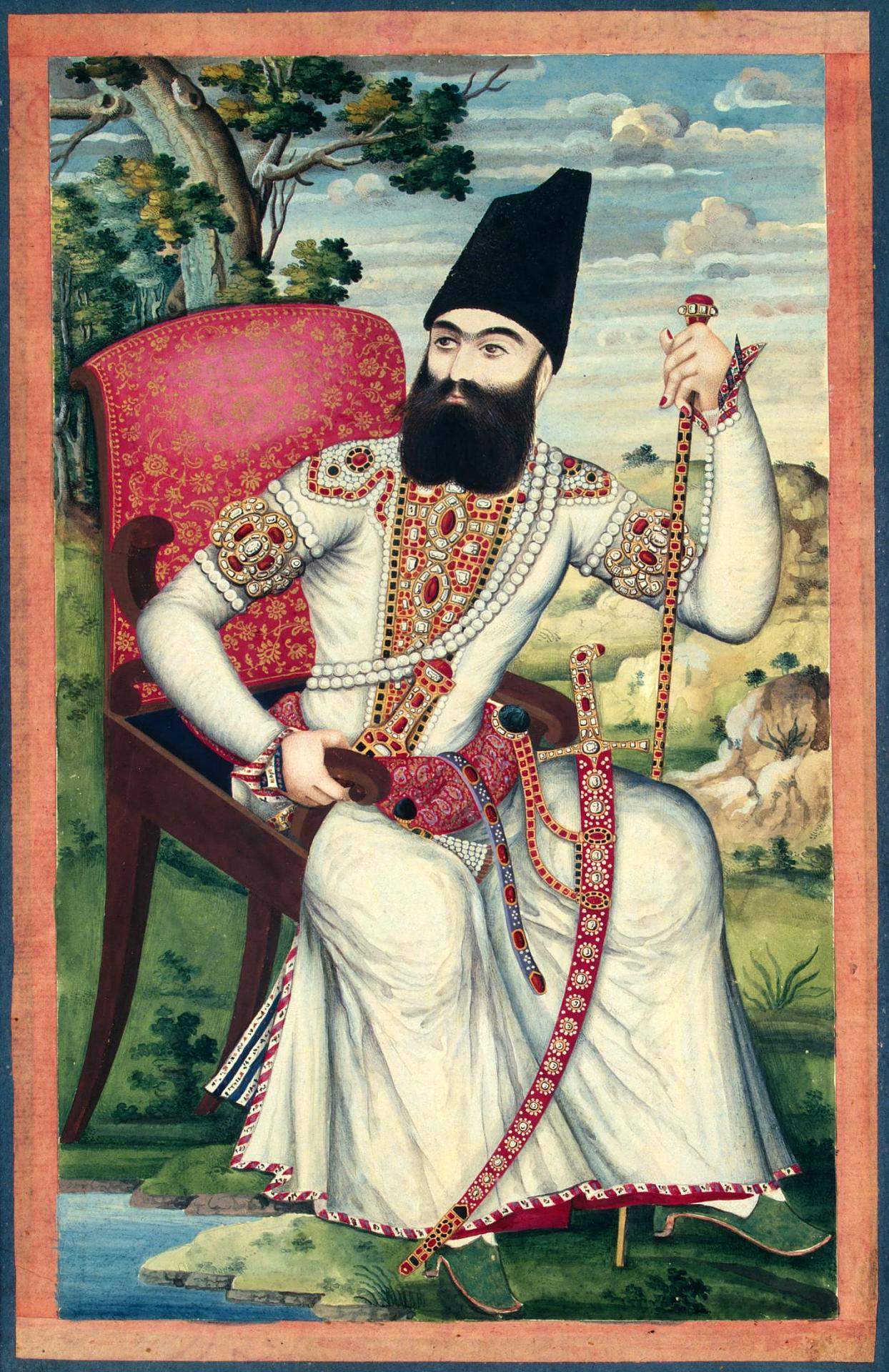
Portrait of Abbas Mirza (?), ca 1820. Hermitage Museum. Notice the treatment of landscape (and especially trees and clouds)

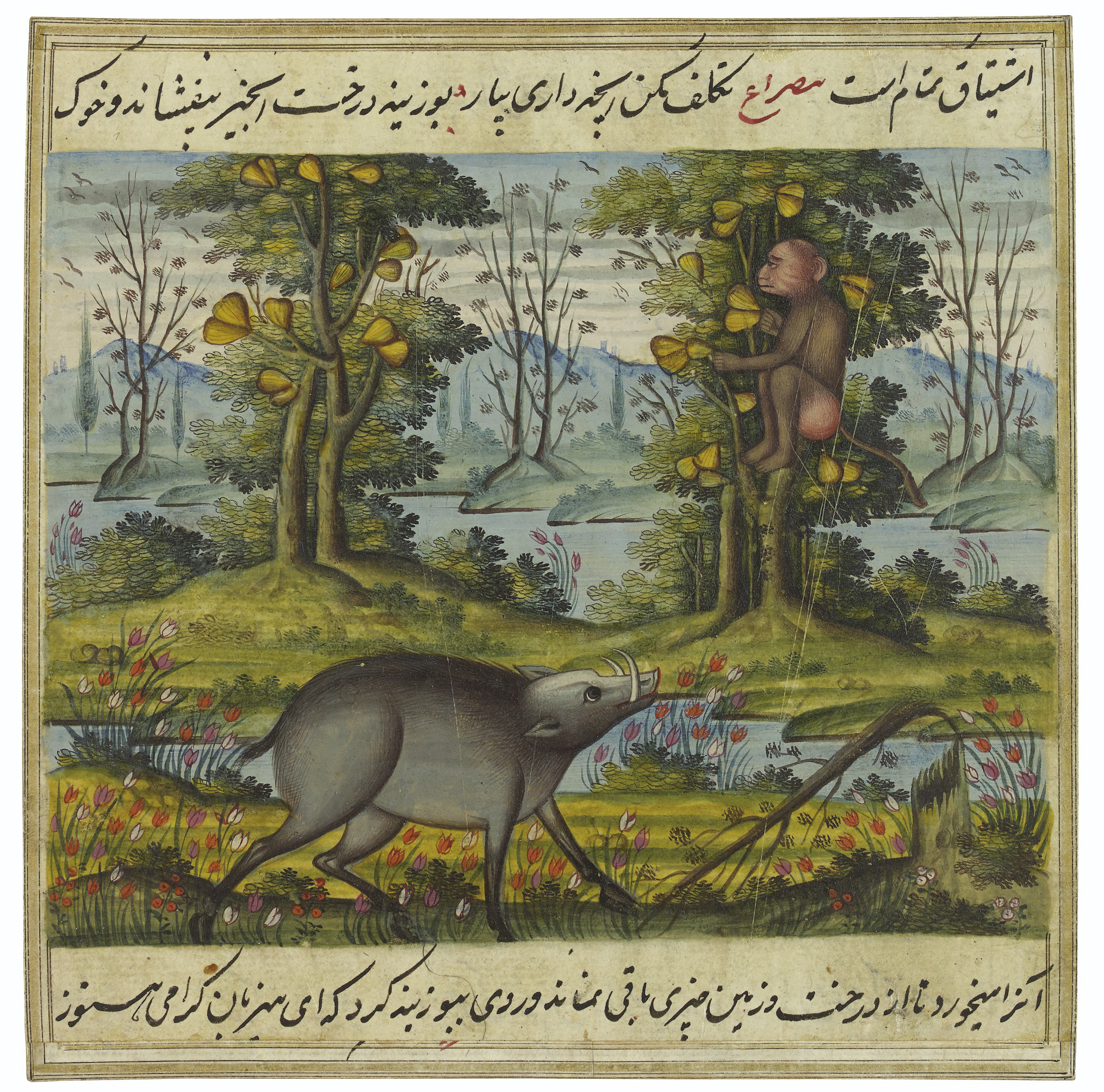
An illustration for the Anwar i-Suhayli. ca 1825

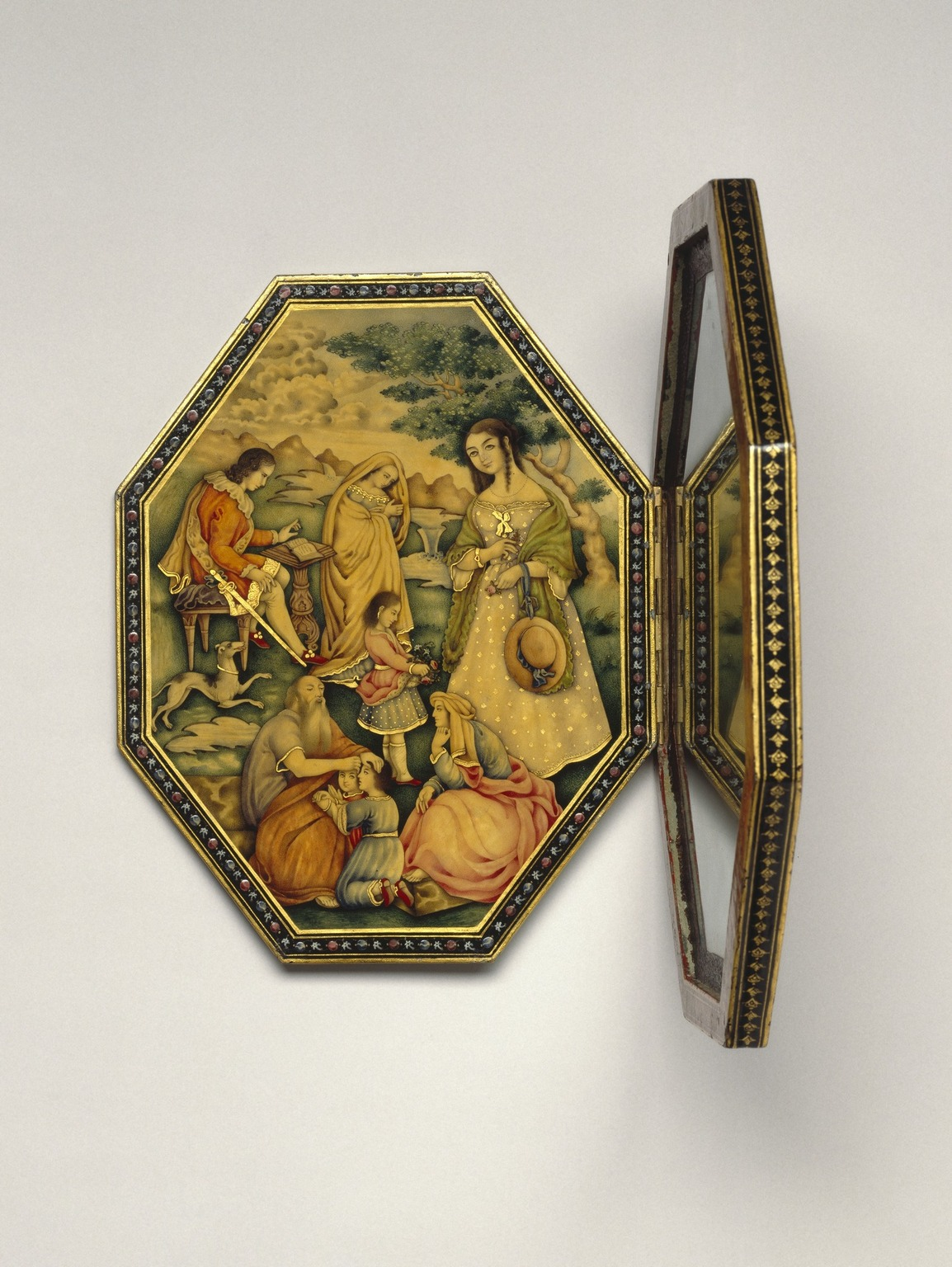
Mirror case, 1845. Luft 'Ali Suratgar Shirazi. Brooklyn Museum

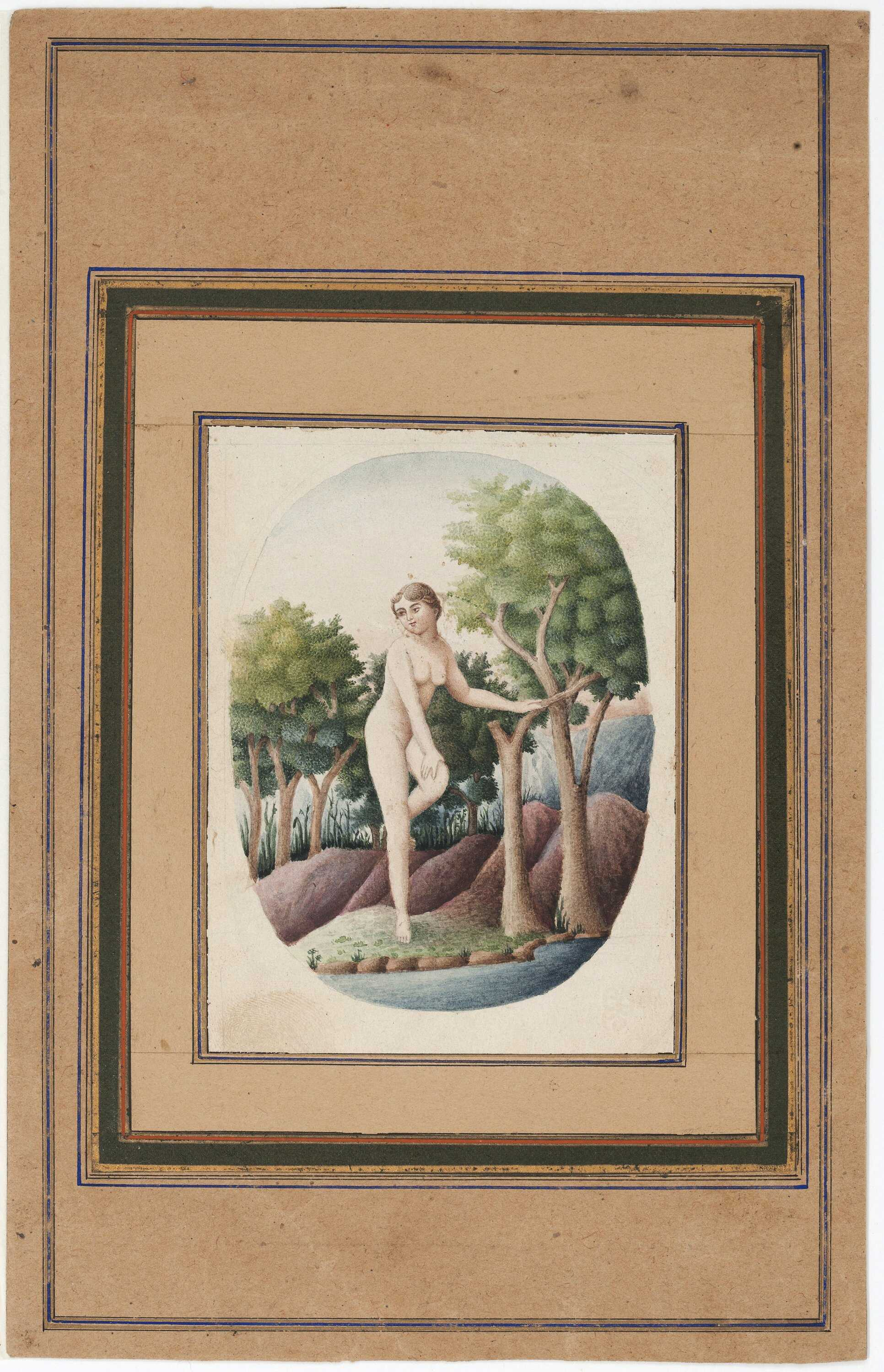
Fille nue près d'un bassin, mid-1800s. Musée d’Art et d’Histoire de Genève. Note subject matter & stippling

=== Single-flower studies; flower & bird ===
Single-flower studies:

See also: https://www.flickr.com/photos/persianpainting/16242329754

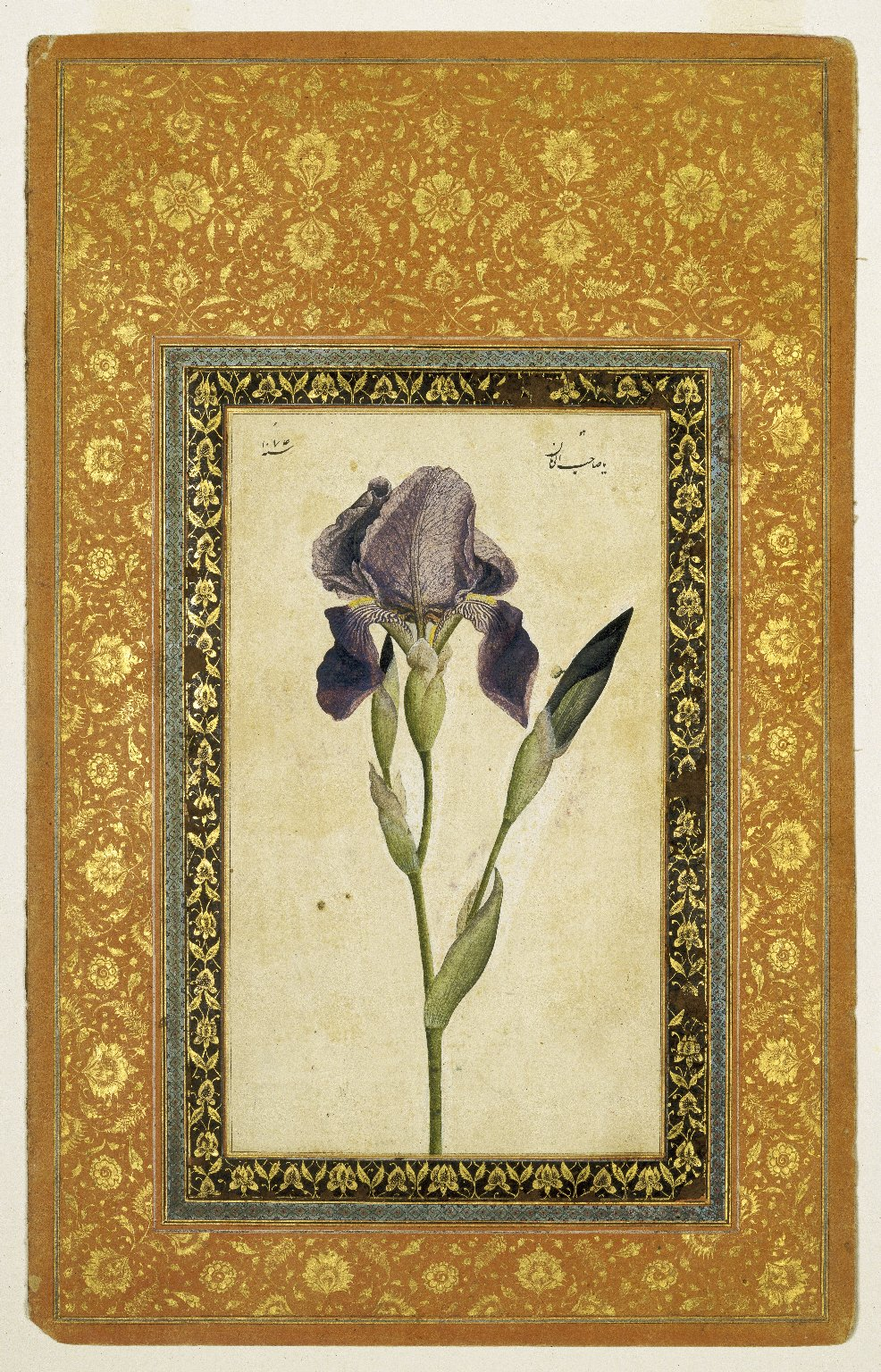
Blue Iris, Mohammad Zaman. 1663/64 C.E. Brooklyn Museum

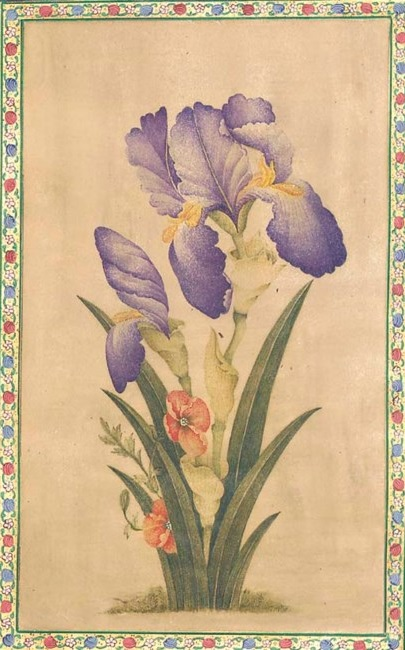
Irises, Zand era

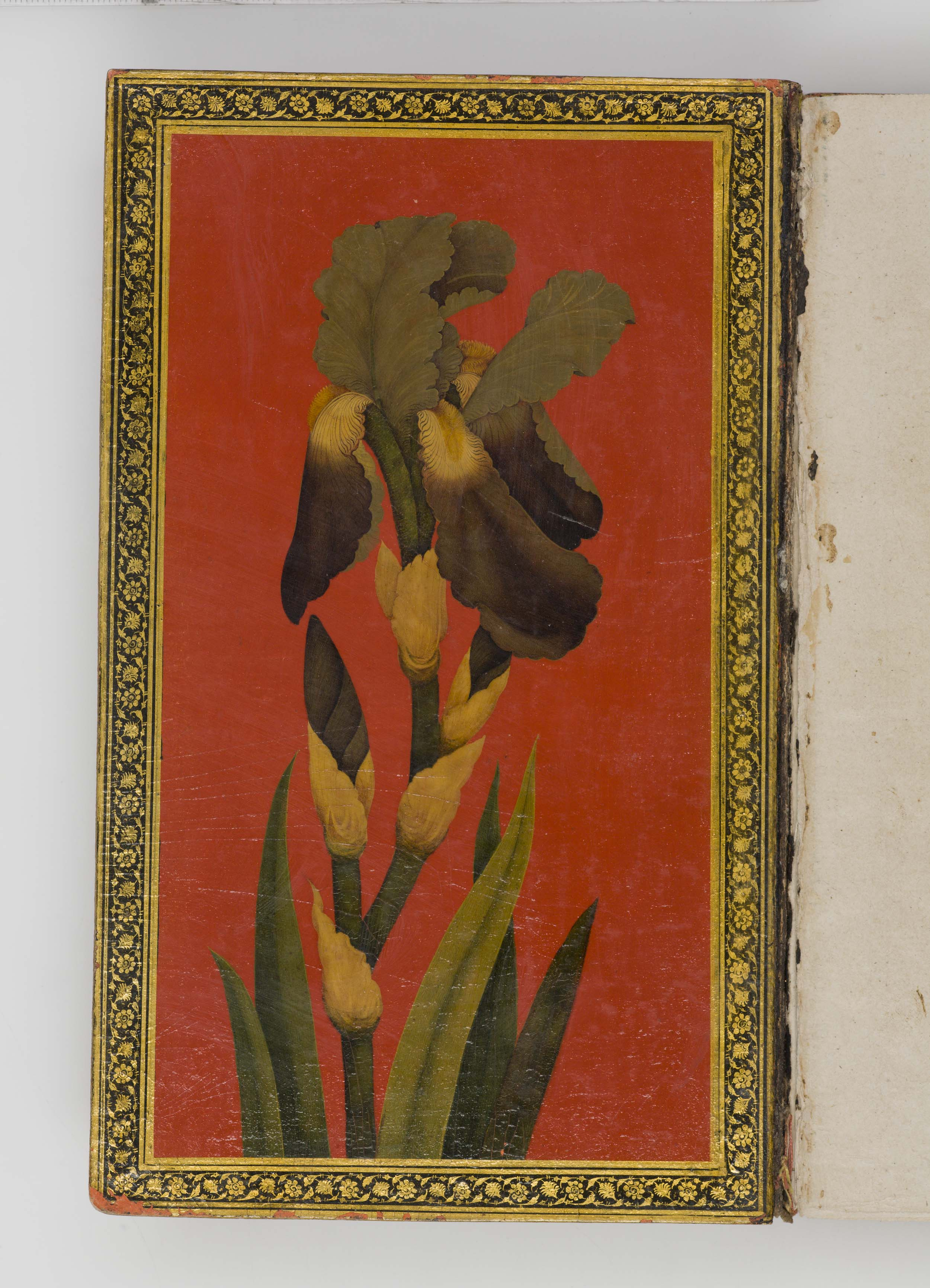
Binding of a Manuscript. Painting by Mohammad Hadi of Shiraz, 1815. Khalili Collections

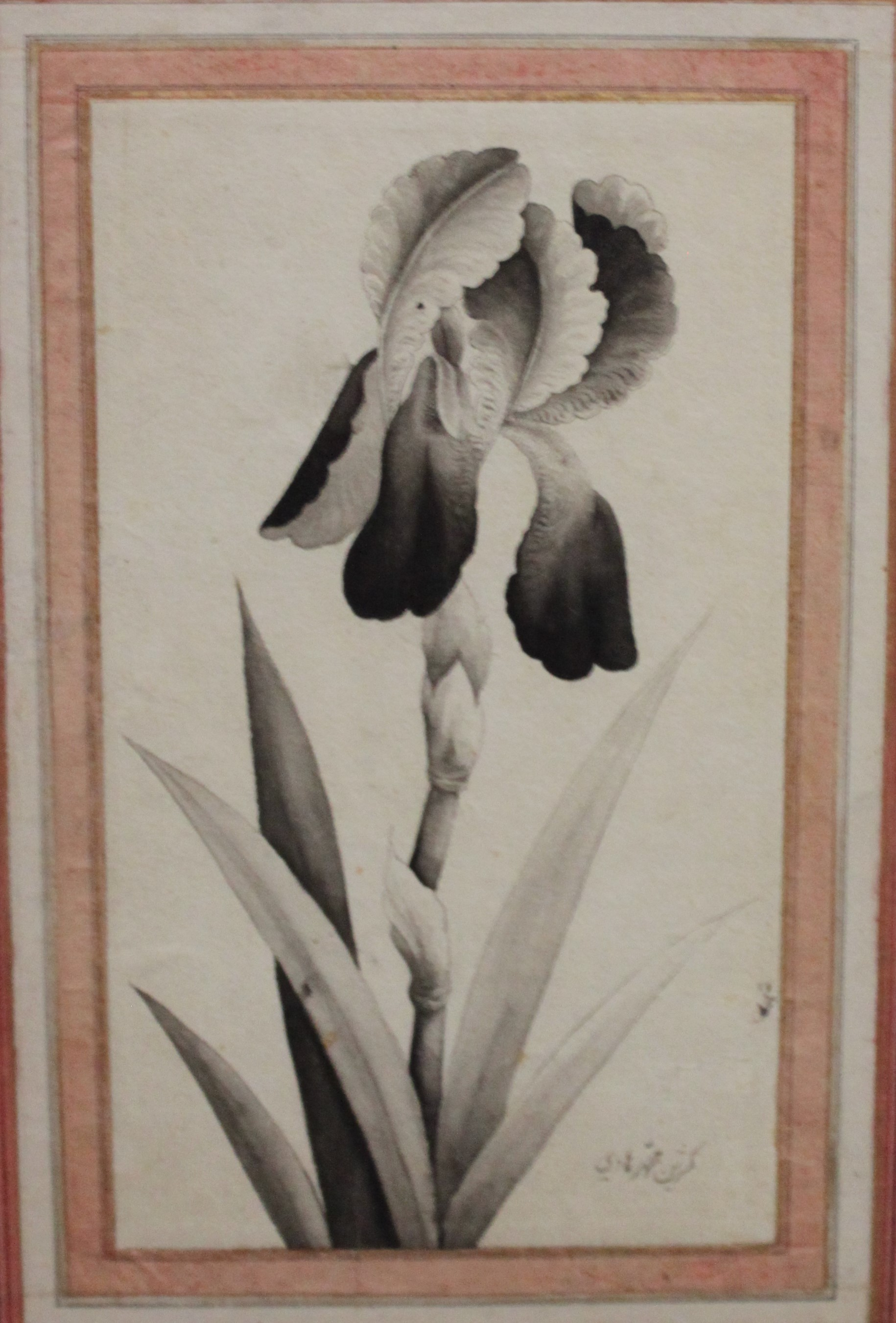
Black Iris. Mohammad Hadi, Shiraz c. 1815–1820. Louvre

=== Miscellaneous ===
Muhammad Zaman's 17.7 × 24.9 cm version from 1684/85 in the St. Petersburg Muraqqa is not shown. Link in footnote

The added top-left cloud can also be seen in Zaman's version.

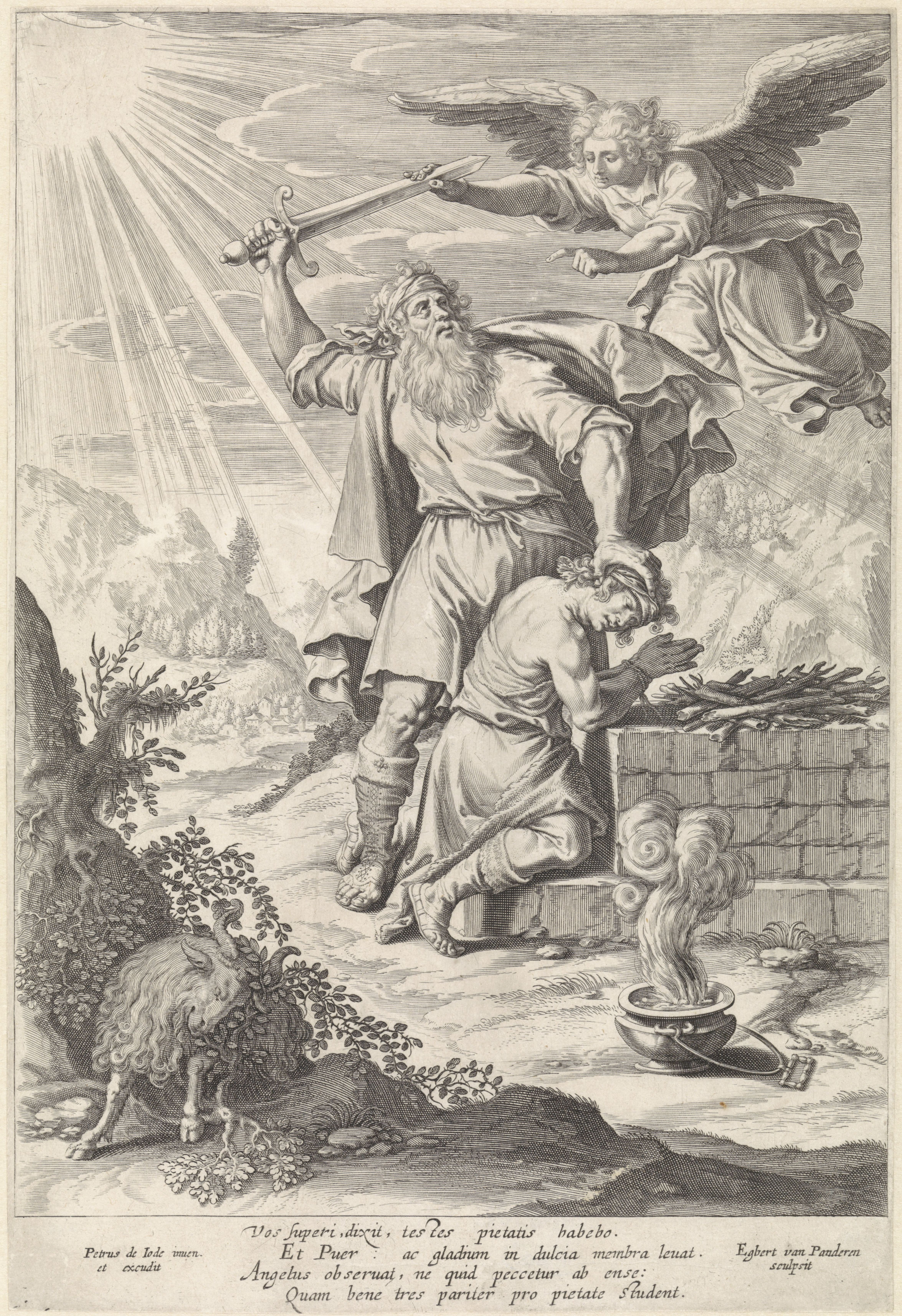
Egbert van Panderen after Pieter de Jode (I). Between 1590 and 1637. 30.1 x 20.5 cm. Rijksmuseum

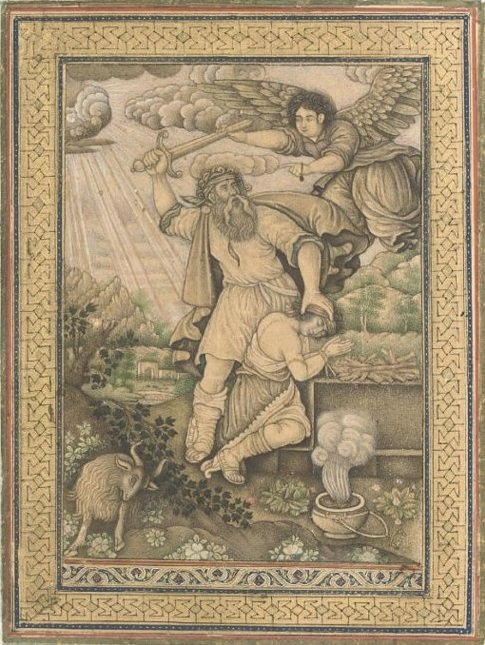
late 17th-early 18th century. 8.5 x 6.5 cm

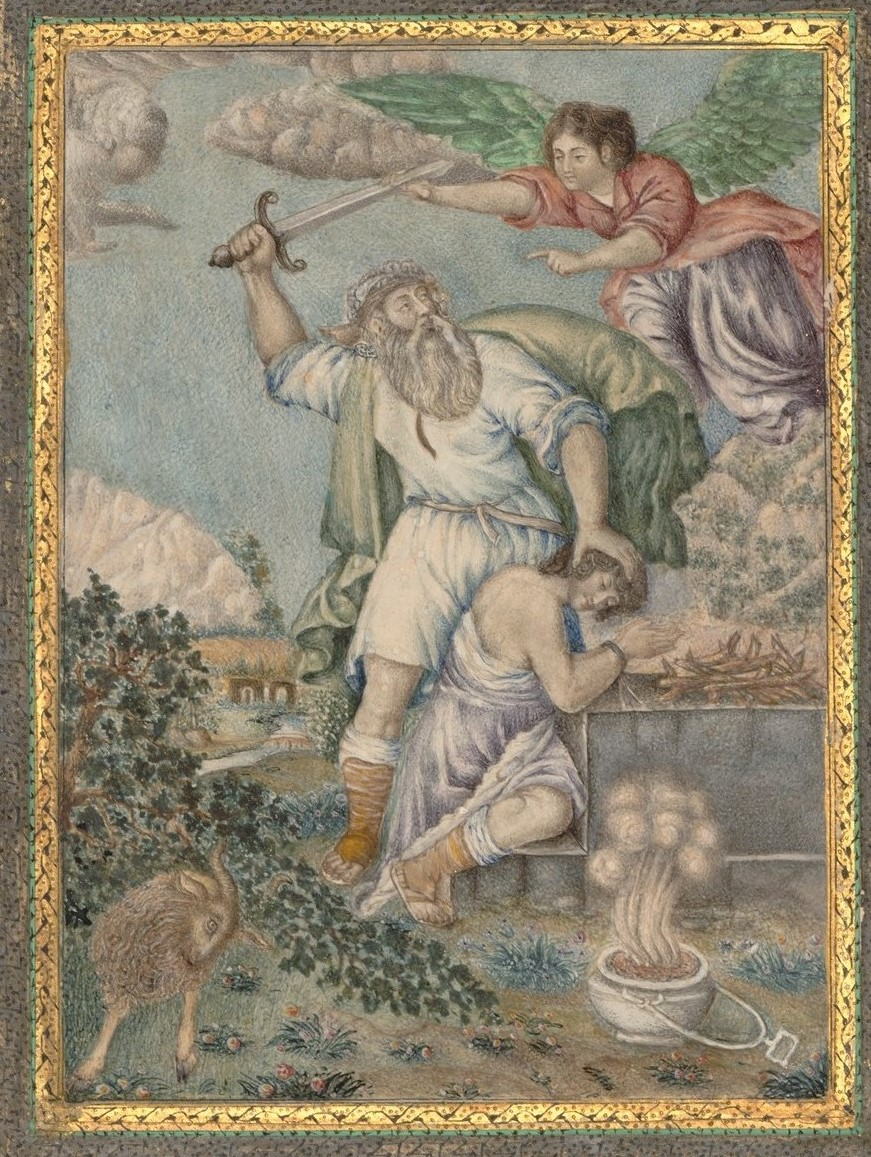
3rd quarter of the 18th century. 8.6 x 6.2 cm. Met Museum

== Sources ==
- Botchkareva, Anastasia A. “Topographies of Taste: Aesthetic Practice in 18th-Century Persianate Albums,” Issue 6 Albums (Fall 2018), https://www.journal18.org/3245. DOI: 10.30610/6.2018.7
- Diba, Layla. "Persian Painting in the Eighteenth Century: Tradition and Transmission." In Muqarnas, 1989. https://www.academia.edu/33526034/Persian_Painting_in_the_Eighteenth_Century_Tradition_and_Transmission
- Habibi, Negar (2021). "Farangi-Sazi". In Yarshater, Ehsan (ed.). Encyclopædia Iranica (Online ed.). Encyclopædia Iranica Foundation.
- Habibi, Negar. “ʿAli Quli Jibadar and the St Petersburg Muraqqa': Documenting the Royal Life?". Proceedings of the Eighth European Conference of Iranian Studies, 2020.
- Habibi, Negar. “The Making of New Art: From the Khazana to Its Audience at the Court of Shah Soleyman.” Safavid Persia in the Age of Empires, 2021. doi:10.5040/9780755633814.CH-018.
- Landau, Amy S. “From Poet to Painter: Allegory and Metaphor in a Seventeenth-Century Persian Painting by Muhammad Zaman, Master of Farangi-Sazi." Muqarnas 28 (2011): 101–31. http://www.jstor.org/stable/23350285.
- Langer, Axel. "European Influences on Seventeenth-Century Persian Painting: Of Handsome Europeans, Naked Ladies, and Parisian Timepieces." In The Fascination of Persia: Persian-European Dialogue in Seventeenth-Century Art & and Contemporary Art of Teheran, edited by Axel Langer. Zürich: Scheidegger & Spiess, 2013.
- Necipoğlu, Gülru. "Persianate Images between Europe and China: The ‘Frankish Manner'." In The Diez Albums: Contexts and Contents. Leiden: Brill, 2016.
