= Yahya Ghaffari =

Iranian painter of the Qajar era

Yahya Khan Ghaffari Abul-Hasan Salés
- یحیی‌خان غفاری
- Born: Yahya Ghaffari
- Died: between 1894 and 1905
- Style: Qajar
- Father: Abu'l-Hasan Sani al-Mulk
- Family: Ghaffari

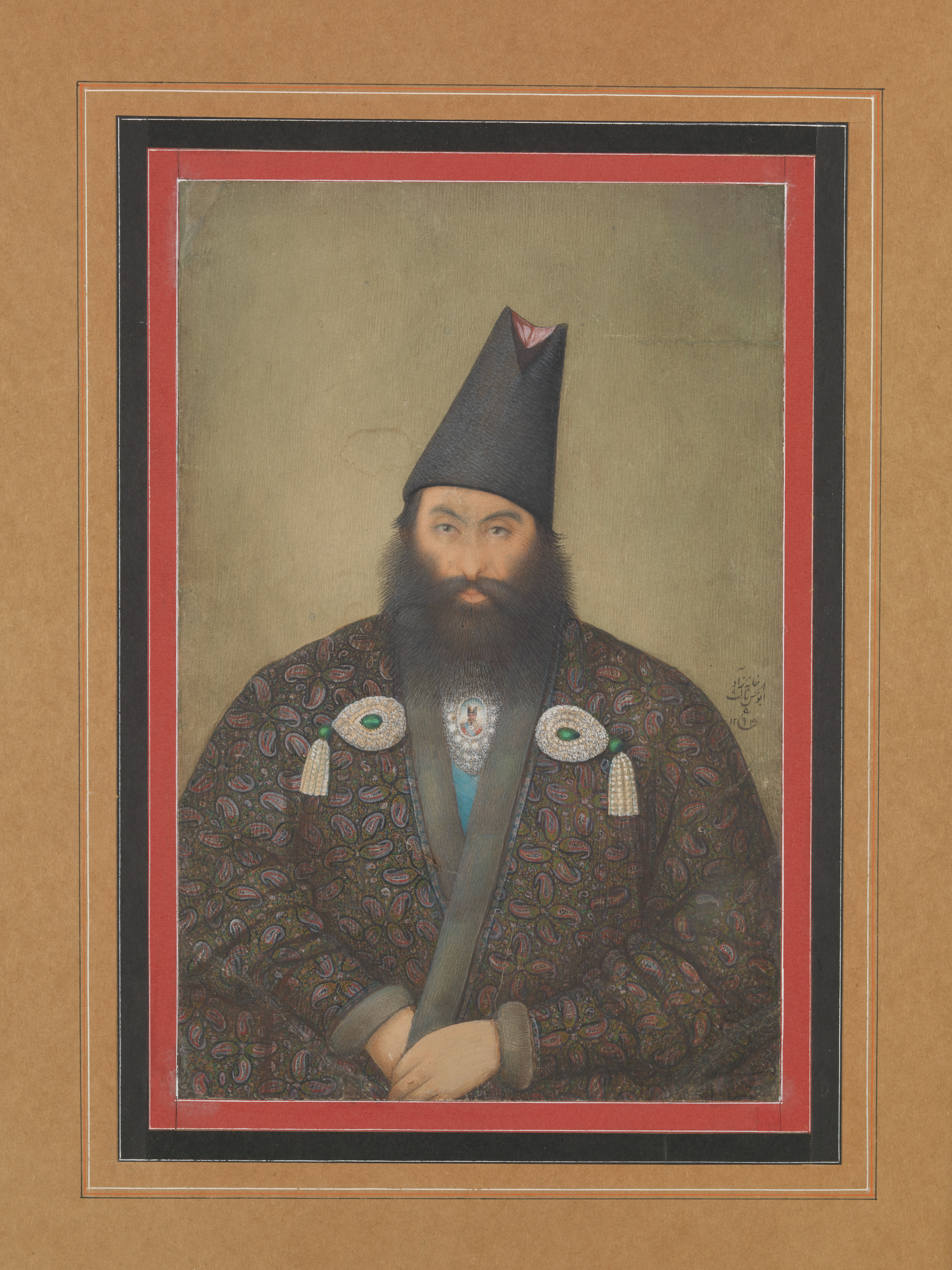
Abul-Hasan Salés; Portrait of a Statesman, possibly Amir Kabir; Opaque watercolor and ink on paper; dated 1294 AH/1877 CE

Yahya Khan Ghaffari (Persian: یحیی‌خان غفاری; died between 1894 and 1905) also known as Abul-Hasan Salés (ابوالحسن ثالث, lit. 'Abul-Hasan the Third'), son of Sani al-Mulk, was one of the royal court painters of the Qajar era during the reigns of Naser al-Din Shah Qajar and Mozaffar ad-Din Shah Qajar. He belonged to the artistic Ghaffari family, several generations of whom were involved in painting and miniature art.

== Life ==
=== Title of Abul-Hasan Salés ===
It is said that he received the title of Abul-Hasan Salés from Naser al-Din Shah due to his resemblance to his father and the Shah's admiration for Sani al-Mulk. The title was meant to signify the continuation of the family's tradition and artistic heritage. Before him, Abu'l-Hasan Mostawfi Ghaffari was called Abul-Hasan Aval (Abul-Hasan the First), and his father, Sani al-Mulk, was known as Abul-Hasan Dovom (Abul-Hasan the Second).

=== Death ===
The exact dates of his birth and death are unknown. However, based on evidence and documentation, he was alive until 1324 AH (circa 1905 AD). According to the Metropolitan Museum of Art's database, his death is estimated to have occurred between 1273 and 1284 SH (1894–1905 AD), which aligns with the aforementioned date.

=== The incident of Abu Torab Ghaffari's death ===
One of the significant events in Abul-Hasan Salés's life was the suicide of Abu Torab Ghaffari in his house. It is said that Abul-Hasan Salés neglected to save him. Some sources suggest that this behavior was due to his jealousy of Mirza Abu Torab's artistic talent. He lived through the era of Mozaffar ad-Din Shah, and his works and activities formed a part of the Qajar era's artistic heritage.

== Artistic style ==
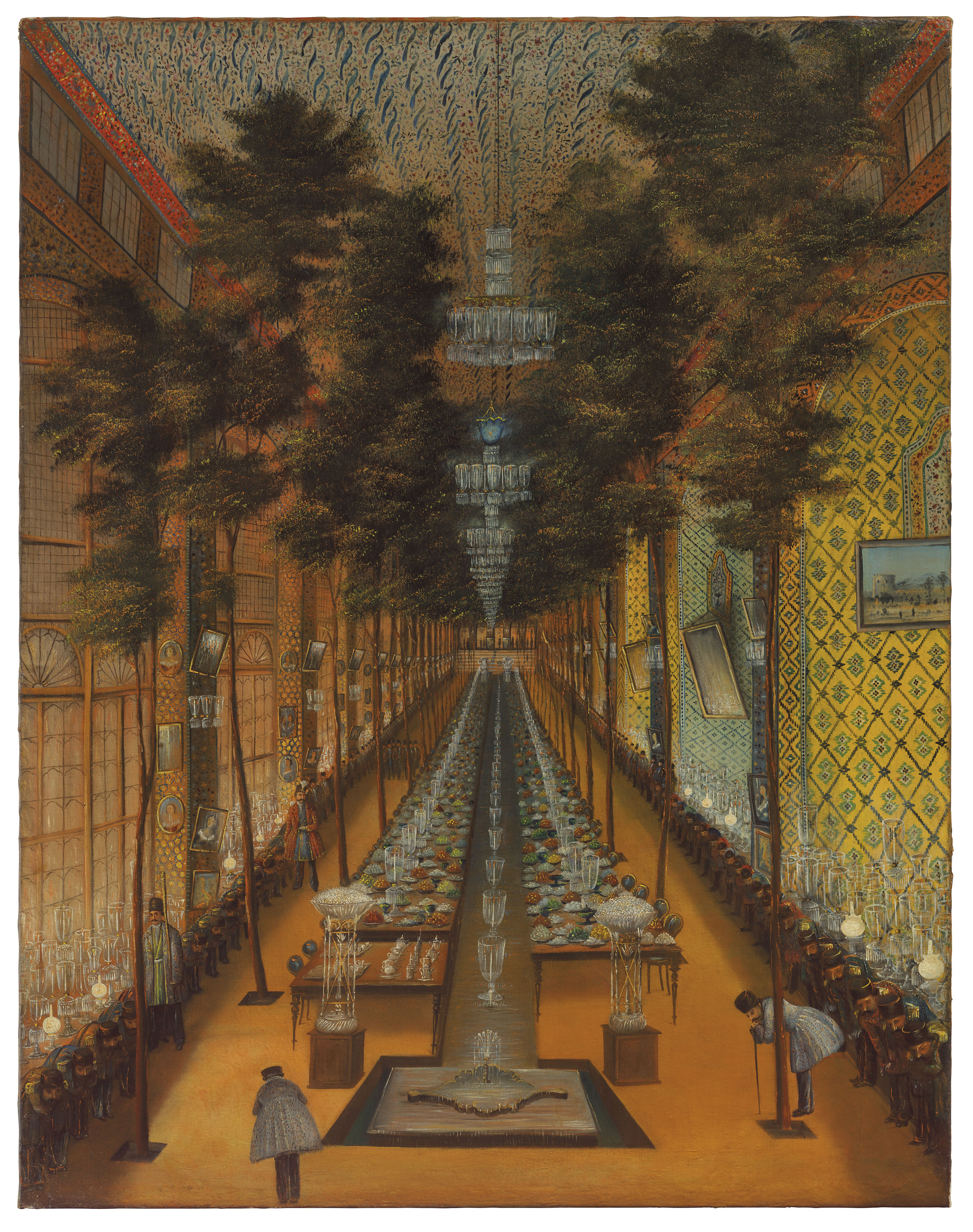
Naser al-Din Shah Qajar at a royal banquet in the Golestan Palace Gardens, attributable to Abul-Hasan Salés, c. 1870–1880

Abul-Hasan Salés was a pupil of his father and became known for his watercolour and oil paintings. Besides his skills in these styles, he was also interested in replicating the works of Renaissance painters. His remaining works include landscapes and oil paintings, which reflect both his influence from Western art and his adherence to Iranian artistic roots.

== Gallery ==
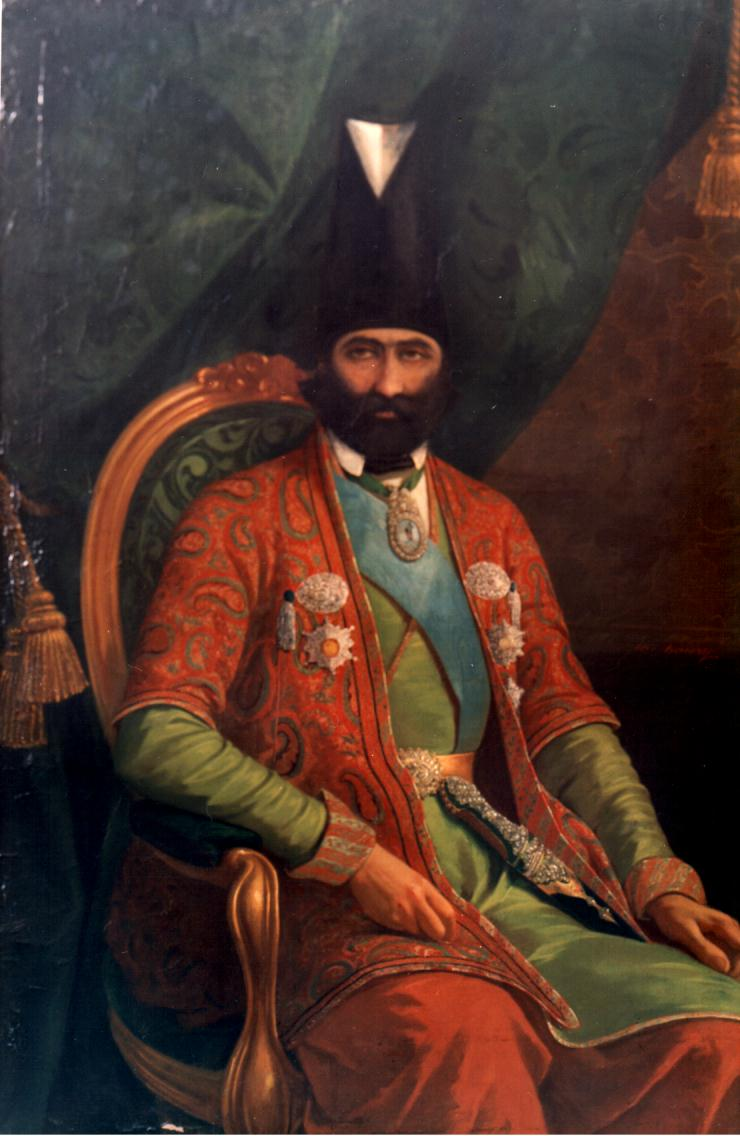
Portrait of Farrokh Khan

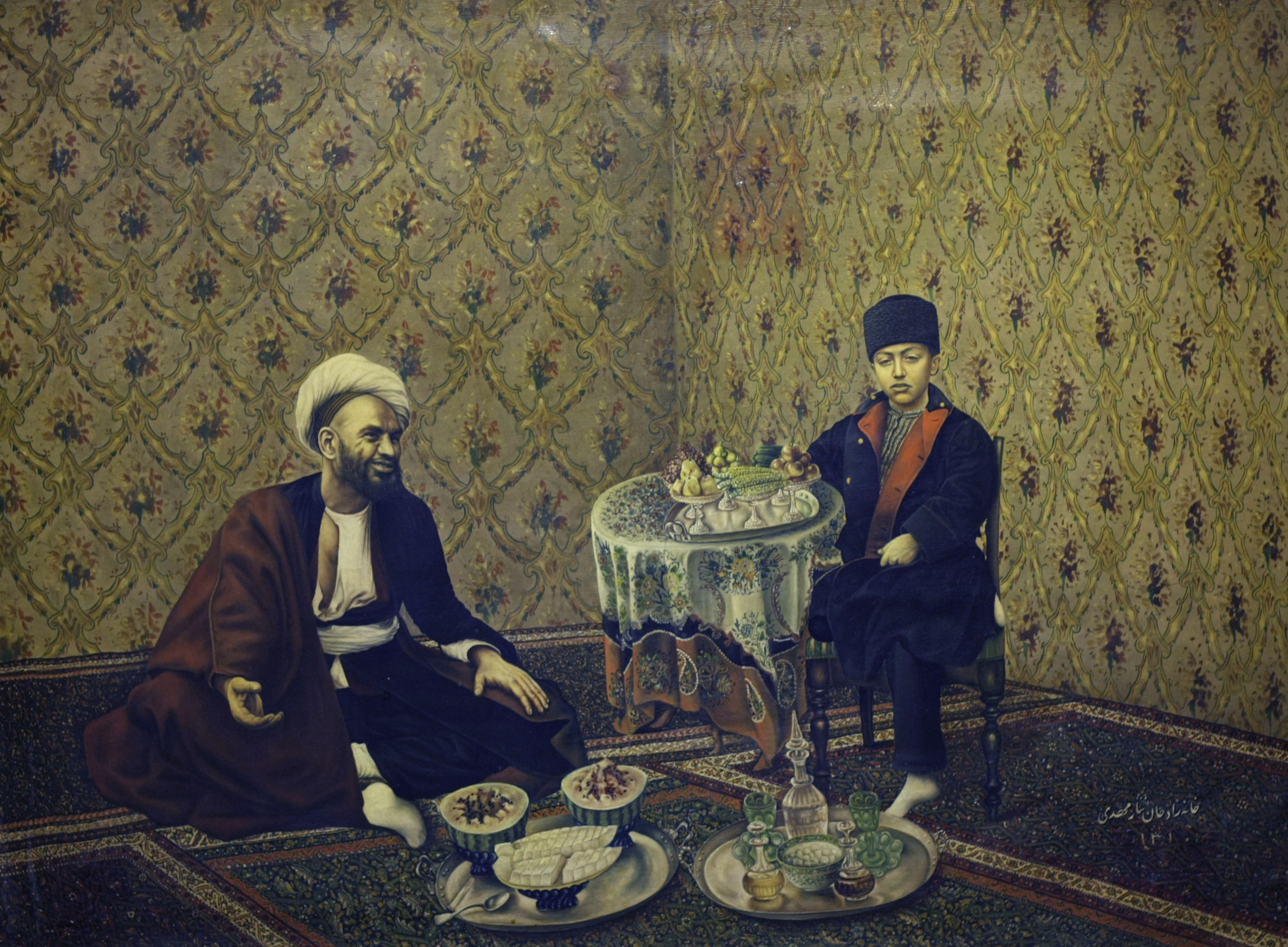
Painting of Aziz al-Soltan (right), 1889

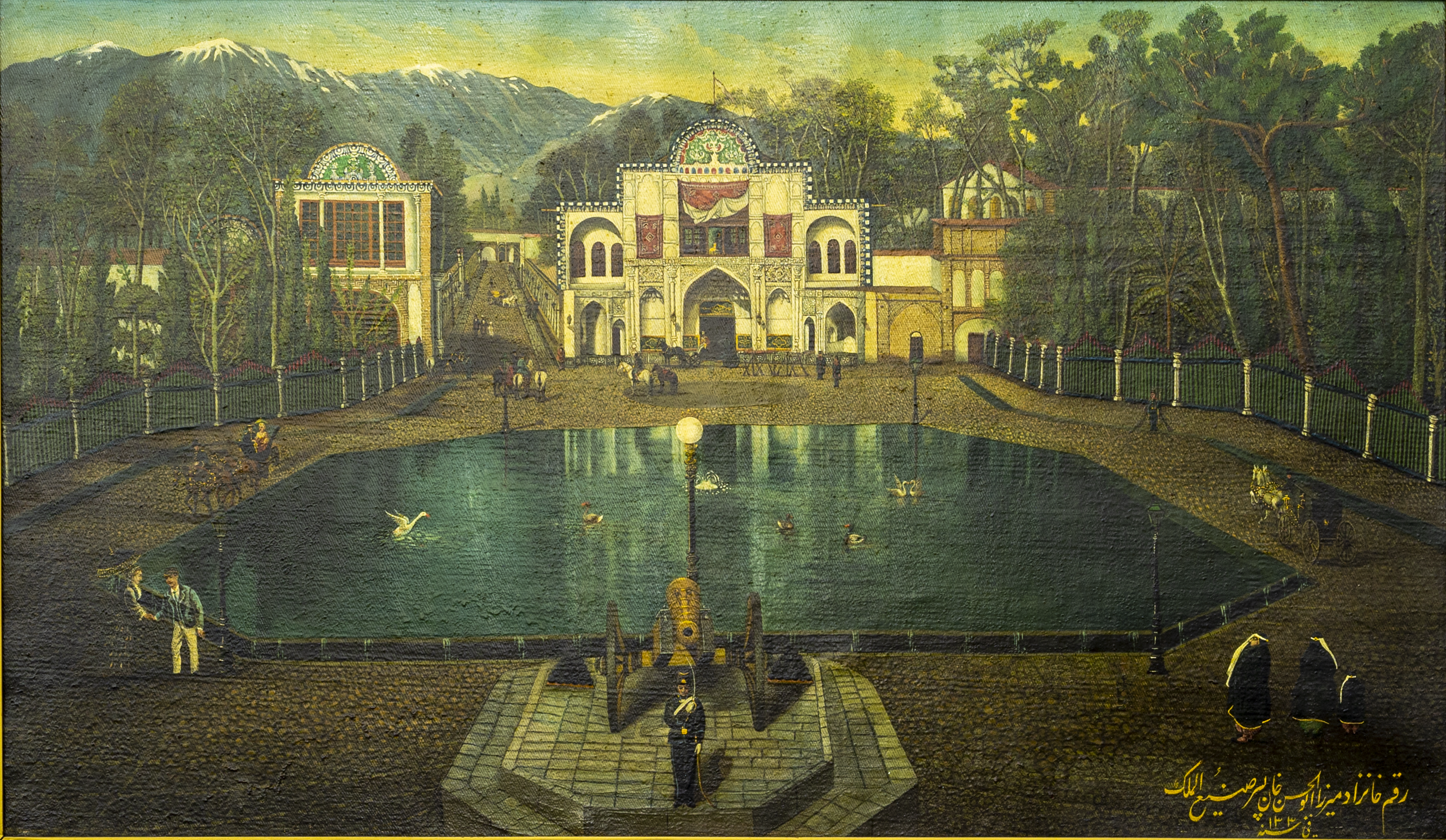
Arg Square in Tehran, 1885/86

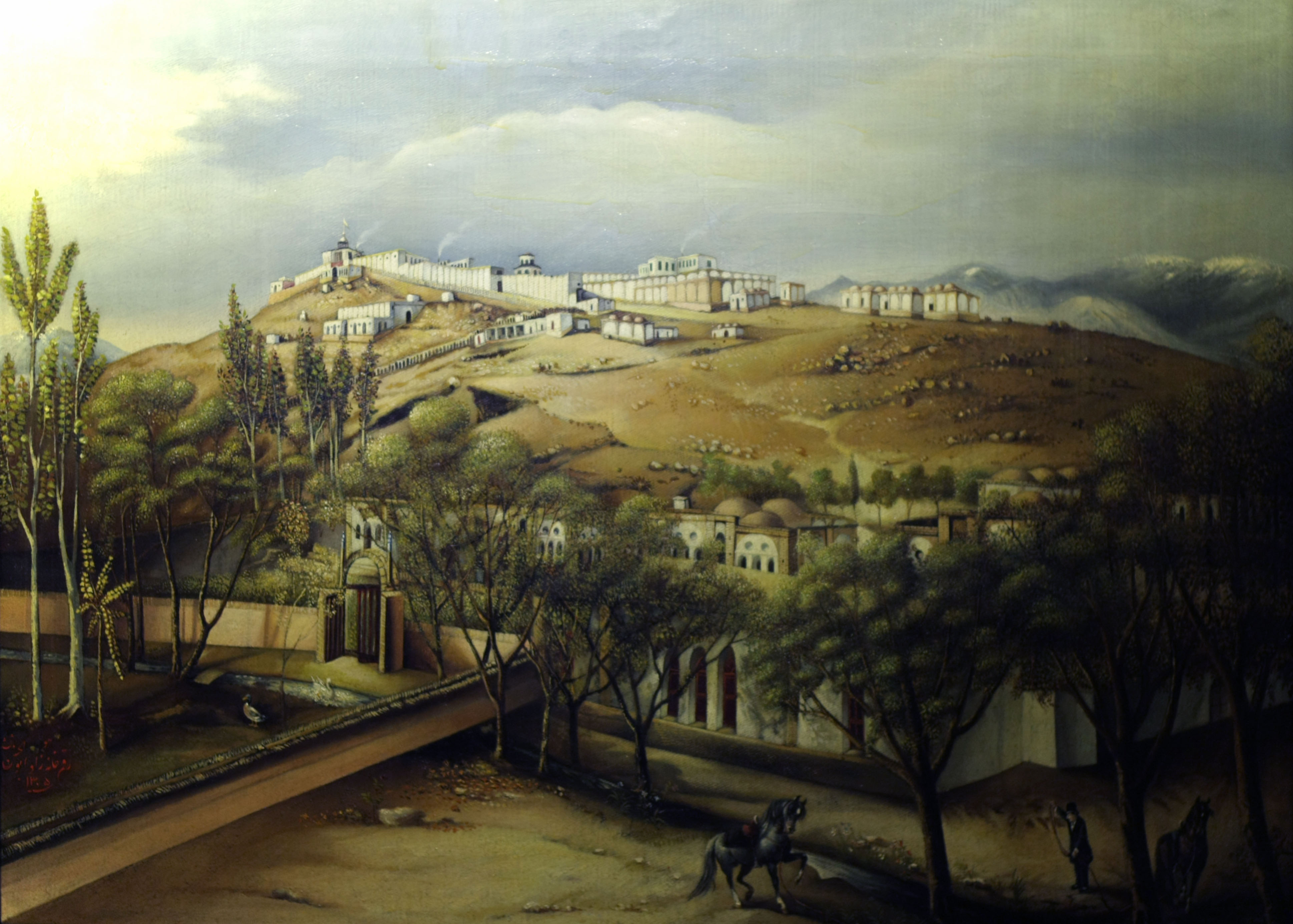
Doshan Tappe Palace

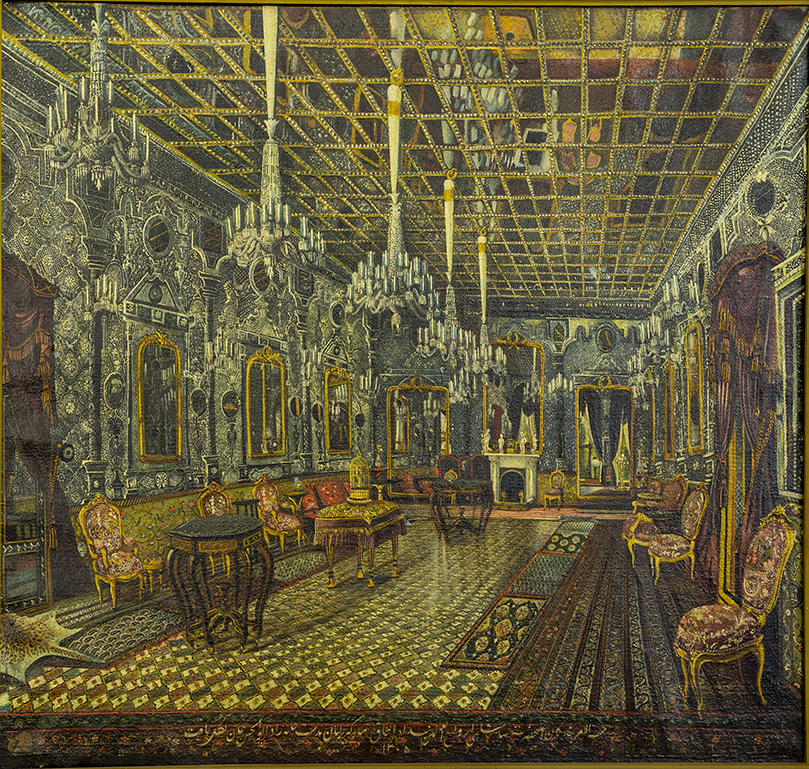
The Brilliant Hall of Golestan Palace, 1887/88
