= Mirza Hashem Khan Ghaffari =

Iranian official (died 1877)

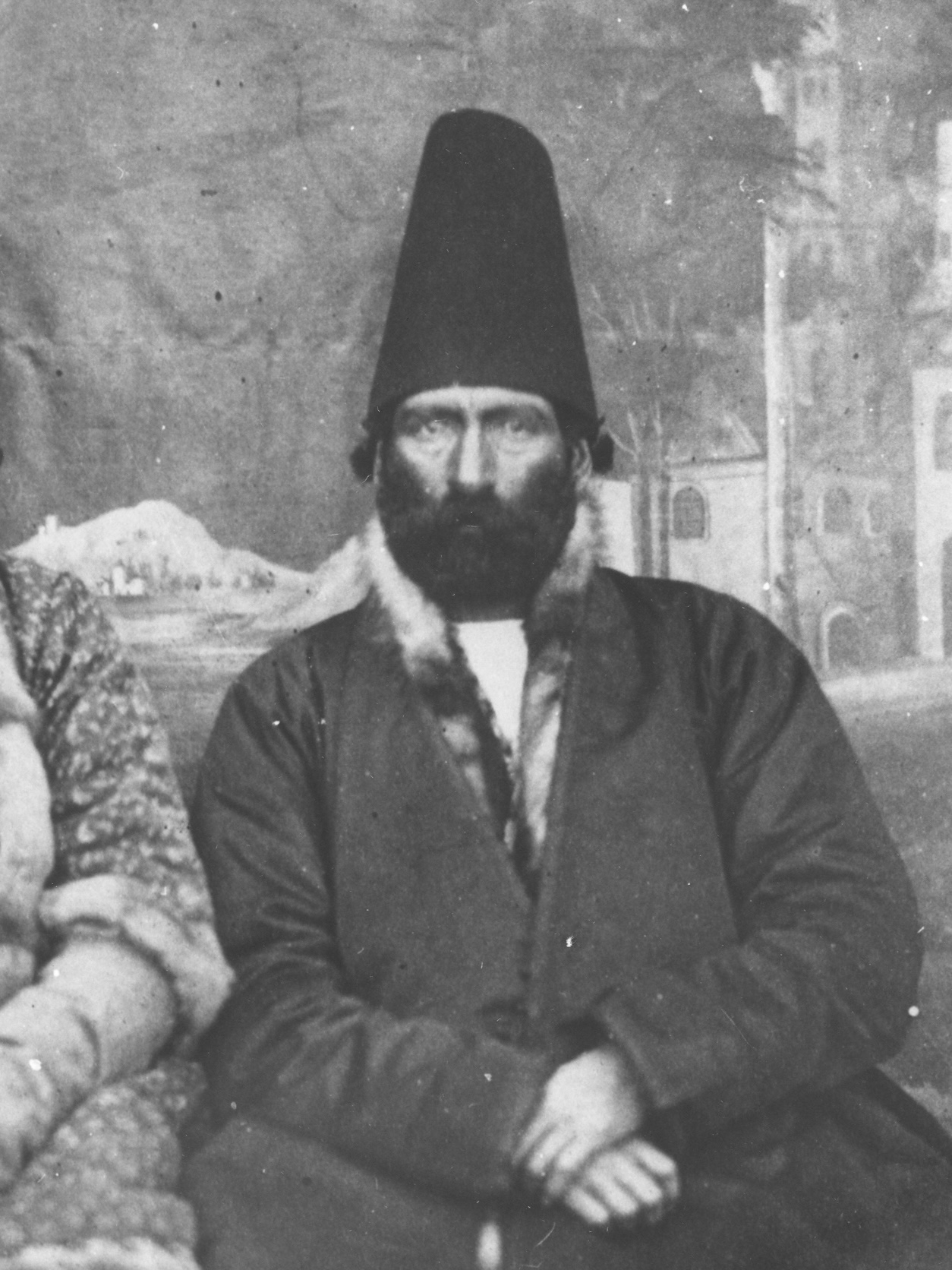
- Photograph of Mirza Hashem Khan (cropped), with Mirza Mohsen Mir-Akhor, Golestan Palace library

Personal details
- Died: 1877 Qajar Iran
- Resting place: Qom
- Children: Mohammad Khan Eqbal od-Dowleh; Gholam-Hossein Khan Ghaffari
- Relatives: Abu'l-Hasan Mostawfi Ghaffari (granduncle); Farrokh Khan (brother); Abu'l-Hasan Sani al-Mulk (cousin); Abu Torab Ghaffari (cousin); Kamal-ol-molk (cousin)

Mirza Hashem Khan Ghaffari (Persian: میرزا هاشم خان غفاری) was an Iranian official from the Ghaffari family. Until 1861/62, he managed the private finances of Naser al-Din Shah Qajar (r. 1848–1896). He was afterwards appointed to three offices; amin-e khalwat, the custodian of the personal estate of the shah, which was a newly created title and office that would remain exclusive to the Ghaffari family; the chief of the court personnel; the commander of the royal musketeers; and the dean of the shah's household. In 1871, a seat in the government's Consultative Assembly was granted to Mirza Hashem Khan. Later that year, following the death of Mirza Hashem Khan's brother Farrokh Khan in May, Naser al-Din Shah appointed him vazir-e hozur and bestowed upon him his brother's title of Amin od-Dowleh.

Mirza Hashem Khan died in 1877 and was buried in the city of Qom. He had two sons who also served in the administration, Mohammad Khan Eqbal od-Dowleh and Gholam-Hossein Khan Ghaffari.

== Sources ==
- Gaffary, F. (1989). "Amīn-e ḵalwat". In Yarshater, Ehsan (ed.). Encyclopædia Iranica (Online ed.). Encyclopædia Iranica Foundation. ISBN 978-0710090959.
