= Gholam-Hossein Khan Ghaffari =

Qajar era courtier (1859-1947)

- غلام‌حسین‌ خان غفاری
- Photograph by Jean-Baptiste Feuvrier, 1889

Minister of Court
- In office November 1896 – 1897
- Monarch: Mozaffar ad-Din Shah Qajar
- Preceded by: Mirza Ali Asghar Khan Amin al-Soltan
- Succeeded by: Mirza Mahmud Khan Hakim ol-Molk

Personal details
- Born: August 5, 1859 Tehran, Qajar Iran
- Died: March 28, 1947 (aged 87)
- Parent: Mirza Hashem Khan Ghaffari (father)

Gholam-Hossein Khan Ghaffari (Persian: غلام‌حسین‌ خان غفاری; August 5, 1859 — March 28, 1947) was an Iranain official, statesman and courtier from Ghaffari family, he was served from reign of Naser al-Din Shah to Ahmad Shah Qajar.

Gholam-Hossein Khan was regarded as one of the more congenial figures of Qajar-era bureaucracy. However, his inability to deal effectively with critical situations and individuals involved in them at times a political liability, partly because he overestimated influence and importance of foreign powers in Iran. He was also known for his extensive collection of Qajar-era photographs, which is notable both for its size and for detailed captions he provided to identify subjects. The original collection remains in the possession of his family, while a duplicate set is held by Central Library of University of Tehran.

== Biography and career ==
Gholam-Hossein was born to Mirza Hashem Khan Ghaffari, the nephew of Farrokh Khan, in Tehran on 5 August 1859. Following his father's footsteps, Gholam-Hossein Khan began his career as one of Naser al-Din Shah's personal pages. By August/September 1882, he had received the title of Amin-e Kalwat (Keeper of the Private Chamber). In 1883, he accompanied shah on his second journey to Khorasan. His promotion to Tofangdar-Bashi (Chief musketeer) in 1883 or 1884 was followed by his appointment as head of court personnel (Amala-ye Kalwat) and shah's personal secretary (Monshi-e Hozur). In latter capacity, Gholam-Hossein Khan grew closer to shah and had responsibilities for reading letters and reports addressed to him, as well drafting shah's replies and Firmans.

During shah's last journey to Europe in 1889, Gholam-Hossein Khan accompanied him as member of his entourage and maintained shah's personal diary, original manuscript of which is now preserved in National Library and Archives of Iran. During the same journey, he was awarded the British Order of St Michael and St George. In 1892 or 1893, he was appointed Special minister. Under Mozaffar ad-Din Shah, he subsequently held two ministerial positions. In November 1896, he was appointed Minister of the Royal Court and from 1899 to 1903, served as Minister of Justice.

=== Governorship of Fars and Tehran ===
On November or December 1905, Gholam-Hossein Khan was appointed governor of Fars, replacing, Malek Mansur Mirza Shoa as-Saltaneh. Within six months, shah and Abdol Majid Mirza recalled Gholam-Hossein Khan from Fars. As compensation, he was appointed governor of Tehran. In February 1908, several months after assassination of Mirza Ali Asghar Khan Amin al-Soltan, Gholam-Hossein Khan reappointed governor of Fars, but his position proved no safer. Shortly after his arrival, Constitutionalist revolutionaries attempted assassination of him.

=== Later career ===
After serving three terms as governor of Kerman (1908–1909), Khorasan (1910–1911) and Gilan around 1912, Gholam-Hossein Khan was appointed Chief of staff to Ahmad Shah. In 1914 and 1915, he served as Minister of War in two short-lived governments headed by Mostowfi ol-Mamalek.

== Sources ==
- Eslami, Kambiz (2000). "ḠAFFĀRĪ, ḠOLĀM-ḤOSAYN KHAN". In Yarshater, Ehsan (ed.). Encyclopædia Iranica (Online ed.). Encyclopædia Iranica Foundation.
- E'temad os-Saltaneh, Mohammad Hasan Khan (1971). Afshar, Iraj (ed.). روزنامه خاطرات اعتمادالسلطنه [The Diary of E'temad al-Saltaneh] (in Persian). Tehran: Amir Kabir Publishers.
- Malekzadeh, Mehdi (1984). تاریخ انقلاب مشروطیت ایران [History of the Constitutional Revolution of Iran] (in Persian). Vol. 1. Tehran: Elmi Publications.
- Bashiri, Ahmad, ed. (1984). کتاب آبی [The Blue Book] (in Persian). Vol. 1. Tehran: Nawid.

== Bibliography ==
- Bamdad, Mehdi (1968). شرح حال رجال ایران در قرن ۱۲ و ۱۳ و ۱۴ هجری [Biographies of Iranian Notables in the 12th, 13th and 14th Centuries AH] (in Persian). Vol. 3. Zavvar. pp. 7–10.
