= Mirza Qahraman Amin Lashkar =

Iranian politician (1828–1892)

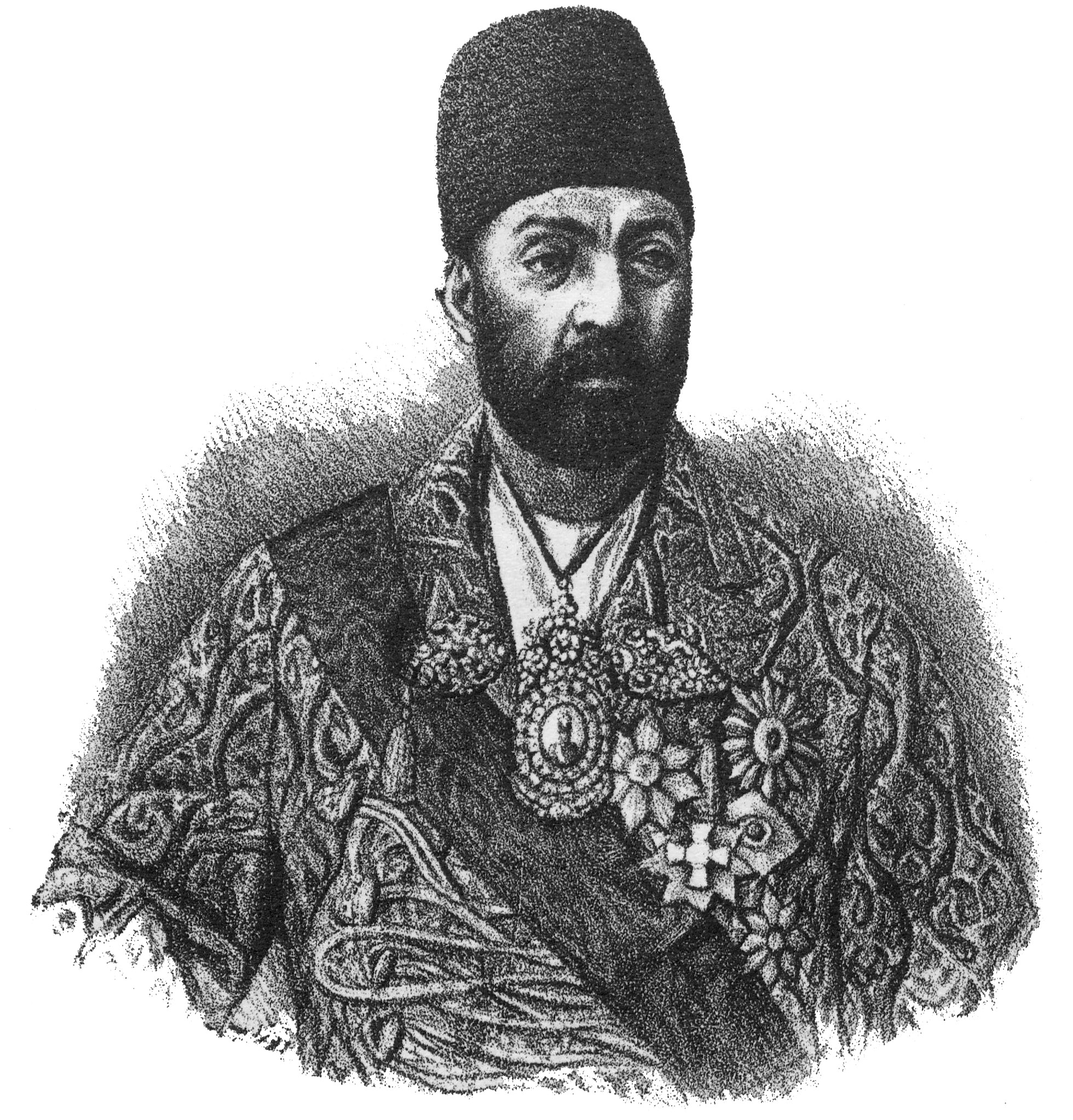
- Illustration of Mirza Qahraman Amin Lashkar by Abu Torab Ghaffari, dated 1883

Personal details
- Born: 1828 Isfahan, Qajar Iran
- Died: 1892 (aged 63 or 64) Tehran, Qajar Iran

Mirza Qahraman Amin Lashkar (Persian: میرزا قهرمان امین لشكر; 1828–1892) was a middle-ranking Iranian official under the Qajar shah (king) Naser al-Din Shah (r. 1848–1896).

== Sources ==
- Amanat, Abbas (1989). "Amīn Laškar, Mīrzā Qahramān". In Yarshater, Ehsan (ed.). Encyclopædia Iranica (Online ed.). Encyclopædia Iranica Foundation. ISBN 978-0710090959.
