= Mehdi Khan Ghaffari =

Iranian official (1865-1918)

Mirza Mehdi Khan
- میرزا مهدی‌ خان
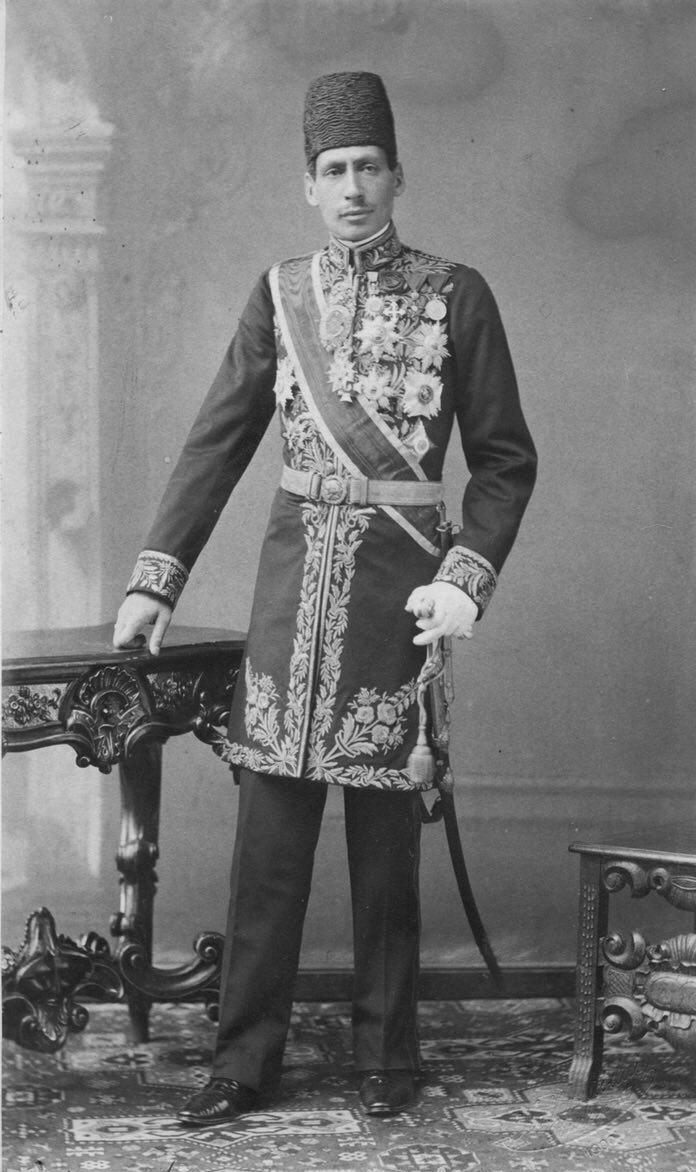

Governor of Zanjan
- In office 1902–1904
- Monarch: Mozaffar ad-Din Shah Qajar

Personal details
- Born: 1865
- Died: 1918 (aged 52–53)
- Spouse: An daughter of Iqbal os-Saltaneh
- Children: Mohammad Hasan Khan Ajoodan Mokhassas
- Parent: Farrokh Khan (father)
- Relatives: Mohammad-Ebrahim Khan Ghaffari (brother)

Mehdi Khan Ghaffari Kashani (Persian: مهدی‌ خان غفاری کاشانی; 1865 – 1918), also known by his titles; (Ajoodan Mokhassas (Special Adjutant), Vazir-e Homayoun and Qa'em-Maqam) was an courtier under Naser al-Din Shah, a close confidant at court of Mozaffar ad-Din Shah and an intimate associate of Mirza Ali Asghar Khan.

Mehdi Khan held the title Ajoodan Mokhassas until 1896, when he was granted the title Vazir-e Homayoun and the title Ajoodan Mokhassas was passed to his son, Mohammad Hasan Khan.

== Career ==
Mehdi served as governor of Zanjan from 1902 to 1904. In his memoirs, Sheikh Ebrahim Zanjani described him as an extraordinarily sensible, intelligent, tactful and eloquent individual... highly prudent, wise, pleasant-spoken and good-natured, who through complete diplomacy subdued the surrounding rebels and tribal warlords... secured the province... and made bread affordable. By establishing two primary schools in Zanjan, Vazir-e Homayoun laid the foundation for modern education in the city.

== Family ==
Mehdi Khan was son of Farrokh Khan. From his marriage with daughter of Iqbal os-Saltanah, Mehdi Khan had a son named Mohammad Hasan Khan, titled Ajoodan Mokhassas. Mohammad Hasan Khan married his cousin Farangis Khanum, the daughter of Mo'aven od-Dowleh; their marriage produced a daughter named Iran Mokhassas, who married Mohammad Reza Vejdani.

== Sources ==
- Bamdad, Mehdi (1968). شرح حال رجال ایران در قرن ۱۲ و۱۳ و ۱۴ هجری، جلد ۴ [Biography of Iran's Political Figures in 12th, 13th and 14th Hijri Centuries] (in Persian). Vol. 4. Tehran: Zavvar.
- Afzal ol-Molk, Gholam Hossein (1982). افضل‌التواریخ [The Best of Histories] (in Persian). Tehran: Tarikh-e Iran.
- Zanjani, Ebrahim (1992). سرگذشت زندگی من [The Story of My Life] (in Persian). Germany: Nima Publishing.
- Gaffary, F. (1984). "Amīn-al-dawla, Farroḵ Khan Ḡaffārī". In Yarshater, Ehsan (ed.). Encyclopædia Iranica (Online ed.). Encyclopædia Iranica Foundation. ISBN 978-0710090959.
- Naraqi, Hasan (1976). "تاریخچه و شجره خاندان غفاری کاشانی" [History and Genealogy of the Ghaffari Kashani Family]. Farhang-e Iran-Zamin (in Persian). 19–20.
