= Golshan-e Morad =

18th century Iranian historical text

The Golshan-e Morad (Persian: گلشن مراد) is a historical text of the Zand era by Abu'l-Hasan Mostawfi Ghaffari.

Despite a few errors in the information for the last years of Karim Khan Zand's reign (1751–1779), when Abu'l-Hasan Mostawfi was reportedly in Kashan instead of the capital of Shiraz, it is considered the most comprehensive and generally the most trustworthy of the Zand records for the period after 1755.

== Sources ==
- Dhoka', Yahya (2015). "Abū al-Ḥasan Mustawfī". In Madelung, Wilferd; Daftary, Farhad (eds.). Encyclopaedia Islamica Online. Brill Online. ISSN 1875-9831.
- Gaffary, F. (1983). "Abu'l-Ḥasan Mostawfī". In Yarshater, Ehsan (ed.). Encyclopædia Iranica. Vol. I/3: Ablution, Islamic–Abū Manṣūr Heravı̄. London and New York: Routledge & Kegan Paul. p. 311. ISBN 978-0-71009-092-8.
- Perry, John R. (1979). Karim Khan Zand: A History of Iran, 1747–1779. University of Chicago Press. ISBN 978-0226660981.
- Perry, John R. (2001). "Golšan-e morād". In Yarshater, Ehsan (ed.). Encyclopædia Iranica. Vol. XI/1: Giōni–Golšani. London and New York: Routledge & Kegan Paul. pp. 108–109. ISBN 978-0-933273-60-3.
