= Khorshid Khanum Ghaffari =

Iranian model of the 1800s

- خورشید خانم غفاری
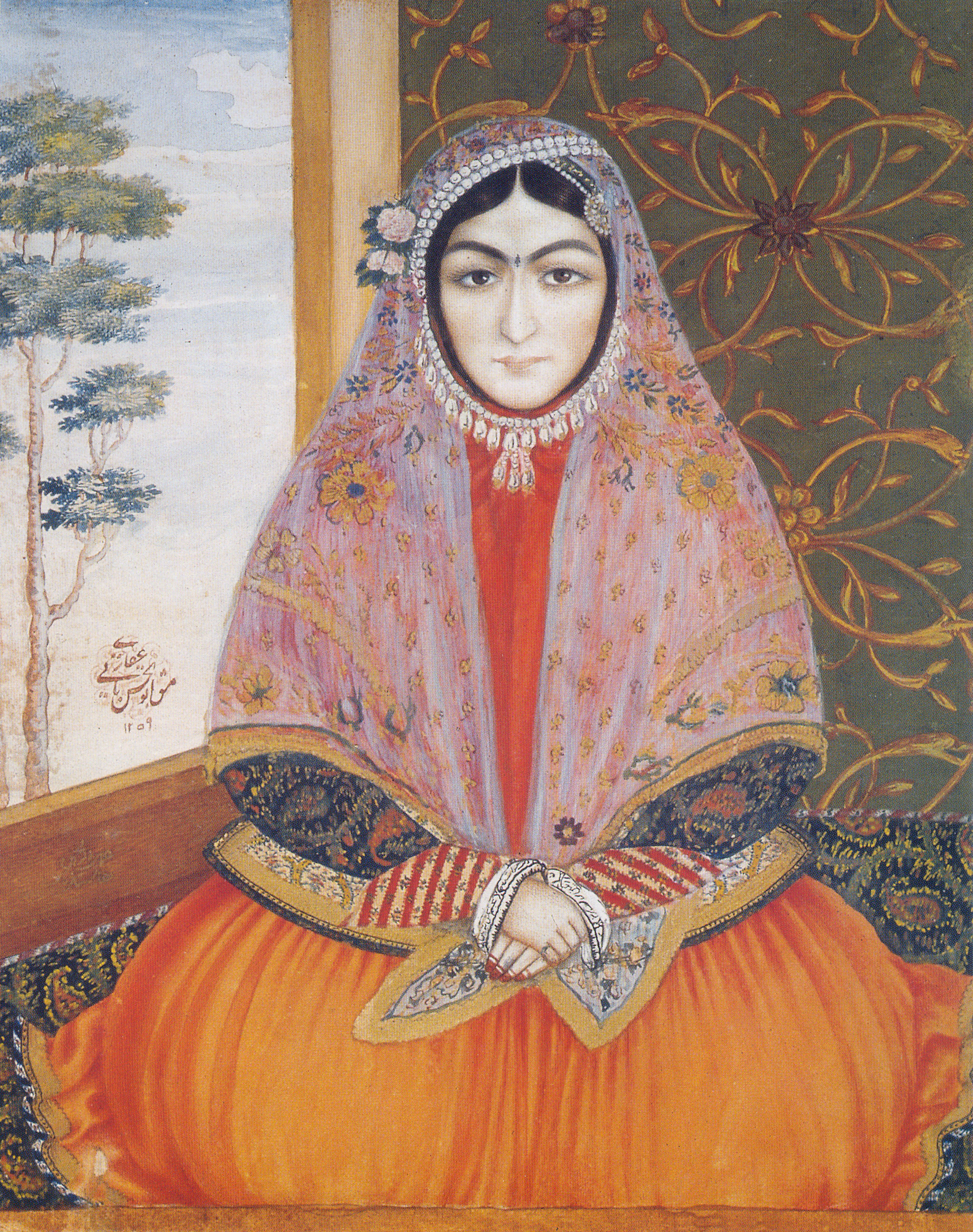
- Portrait of Khorshid Khanum Ghaffari, 1834/35
- Father: Mirza Ahmad Ghaffari
- Family: Ghaffari family

Khorshid Khanum Ghaffari (Persian: خورشید خانم غفاری) was a member of the Ghaffari family, who is notable for being depicted on a watercolor painting by her first cousin once removed Sani ol-Molk.

She was the daughter of Mirza Ahmad Ghaffari and the aunt of Farrokh Khan. Before photography and lithography became available in Qajar Iran, only a small number of portraits of known women existed. Some of these portraits were likely created just after lithography became available, during the rule of Mohammad Shah Qajar (r. 1834–1848). Khorshid Khanum's portrait, dated 1834 or 1835, was made just before the introduction of photography and lithography to the country. Other notable women depicted on portraits during this period include Zia ol-Saltaneh and Malek Jahan Khanum. Including women in paintings may have been a part of the increasing popularity of portraits in general during the early years of Mohammad Shah's rule.

Men in the Qajar-era paintings are frequently depicted as standing or kneeling to the side, contrary to Khorshid Khanum, who is kneeling frontally. Khorshid Khanum is depicted wearing an arkhaloq dress made of termeh. The Iranian historian Yahya Zoka argues that Khorshid Khanum served as an inspiration for the first female characters painted by Sani ol-Molk, "both because her beauty conformed with the canons of the time and because their kinship allowed them to be intimate." He notes many similarities between Khorshid Khanum and other women in Sani ol-Molk's paintings, including his Two Lovers.

== Sources ==
- Zoka, Yahya (2003). Parham, Cyrus (ed.). The Life and Works of Sani' ol-Molk: Abol-Hassan Ghaffari 1814-1866. Iran University Press. ISBN 978-9640110966.
- Scheiwiller, Staci Gem (2016). Liminalities of Gender and Sexuality in Nineteenth-Century Iranian Photography: Desirous Bodies. Routledge. ISBN 978-1138201293.
