= Mohammad-Ebrahim Khan Ghaffari =

Iranian diplomat and minister 1859–1918

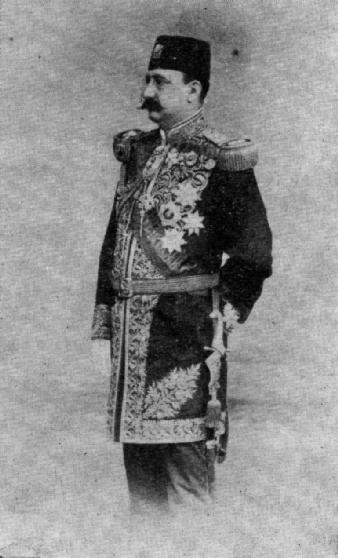
- Photograph of Mohammad-Ebrahim Khan Ghaffari

Personal details
- Born: 1859/60 Qajar Iran
- Died: November/December 1918 Qajar Iran
- Parent: Farrokh Khan (father)
- Relatives: Mehdi Khan Ghaffari (brother)

Mohammad-Ebrahim Khan Ghaffari (Persian: محمدابراهیم خان غفاری: 1859/60 – November/December 1918) was an Iranian diplomat and minister during the late Qajar era. A member of the Ghaffari family, he was the son of the high-ranking official Farrokh Khan.

== Sources ==
- Eslami, Kambiz (2000). "Ḡaffārī, Moḥammad-Ebrāhīm Khan". In Yarshater, Ehsan (ed.). Encyclopædia Iranica (Online ed.). Encyclopædia Iranica Foundation. ISBN 978-0710090959.
