= Ghaffari family =

Iranian family

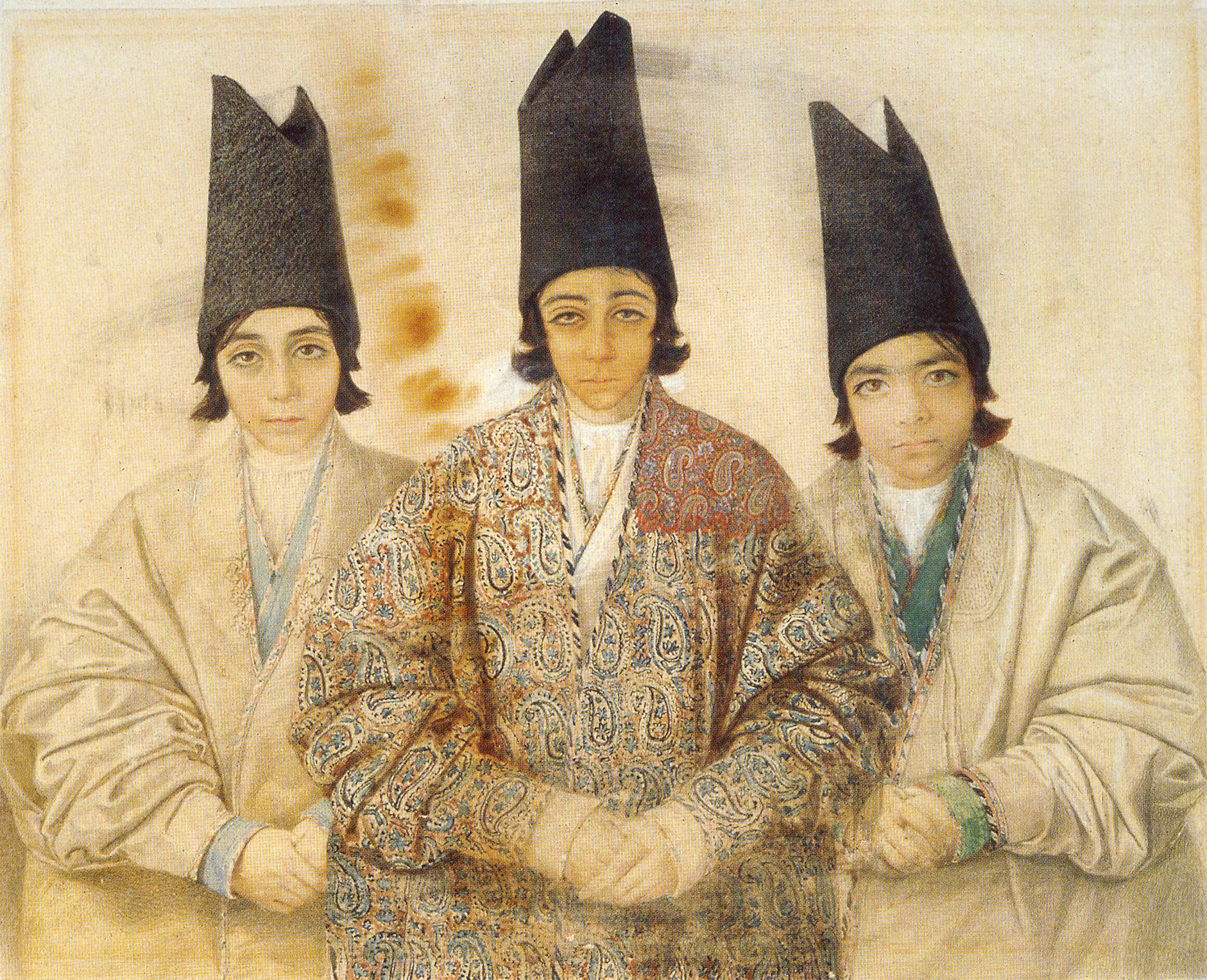
Illustration of the sons of Farrokh Khan, made by his cousin Abu'l-Hasan Sani al-Mulk in c. 1858

The Ghaffari family (Persian: خاندان غفاری) is an Iranian family of artists, jurists and bureaucrats from Kashan.

Notable members include:

- Abu'l-Hasan Mostawfi Ghaffari (died c. 1797/98)
- Khorshid Khanum Ghaffari (fl. 1834/1835)
- Farrokh Khan (1812–1871)
- Mirza Hashem Khan Ghaffari (died 1877)
- Abu'l-Hasan Sani al-Mulk (1814–1866)
- Abu Torab Ghaffari (died 1890)
- Yahya Ghaffari (died between 1894–1905)
- Kamal-ol-molk (1848–1940)
- Mohammad-Ebrahim Khan Ghaffari (1859/60 – November/December 1918)

== Sources ==
- Bloom, Jonathan; Blair, Sheila (2009). "Ghaffari". Grove Encyclopedia of Islamic Art & Architecture: Three-Volume Set. Oxford University Press. ISBN 978-0195309911.
- Eslami, Kambiz (2000). "Amīn-e ḵalwat". In Yarshater, Ehsan (ed.). Encyclopædia Iranica (Online ed.). Encyclopædia Iranica Foundation. ISBN 978-0710090959.
- Floor, Willem (1999). "Art (Naqqashi) and Artists (Naqqashan) in Qajar Persia". Muqarnas. 13. Brill: 125–154. JSTOR 1523268. (registration required)
- Gaffary, F. (1989). "Amīn-e ḵalwat". In Yarshater, Ehsan (ed.). Encyclopædia Iranica (Online ed.). Encyclopædia Iranica Foundation. ISBN 978-0710090959.
