= Abu'l-Hasan Mostawfi Ghaffari =

18th century Iranian painter and historian

- Born: Late 18th-century Kashan, Iran
- Died: c. 1797/98
- Occupations: Painter and historian
- Notable work: Golshan-e Morad
- Father: Mirza Mo'ezz-al-din Mohammad Ghaffari
- Relatives: Farrokh Khan (great-nephew); Abu'l-Hasan Sani al-Mulk (great-nephew)

Abu'l-Hasan Mostawfi Ghaffari (Persian: ابوالحسن مستوفی غفاری) was an 18th-century Iranian painter and historian from the Ghaffari family of Kashan. Besides several European-style paintings, he is also known to be the author of the Golshan-e Morad, a book covering the history of the Zand dynasty.

== Biography ==
The Ghaffari family had a lengthy history of serving in government. Abu'l-Hasan's father, Mirza Mo'ezz-al-din Mohammad Ghaffari, was the governor of Kashan, Qom, Natanz and Jowshaqan during the reign of Karim Khan Zand (r. 1751–1779). Abu'l-Hasan was born in Kashan in the late 18th century. He had two brothers named Abdul Matlab and Mirza Ahmad. Since the late Safavid era, European-style paintings had been a favorite subject of Iranian artists, and Abu'l-Hasan was the first member of his family to show an interest in them. Abu'l-Hasan describes how he started painting;

"From the age of seven, I spent ten years learning to paint. However, because my father did not want me to do this, Mirza Muhammad Burujirdi who was a friend of my father and also worked at the court of the Zands, at my father's request once started talking about the prerequisites for painting. He advised me, "Even though painting is a delicate art and an honest trade, it provides an uncertain livelihood and is considered beneath the dignity of a man—certainly that of a man of your rank. It therefore behoves you to follow in the footsteps of your father.""

Abu'l-Hasan then made the decision to shift career paths. After learning the craft of annotation, he started writing official records and eventually rose to the position of court historian of Karim Khan. Due to internal strife amongst the Zand family following Karim Khan's death in 1779, Abu'l-Hasan appears to have stopped writing between 1780 and 1784. But after these problems subsided in 1784 under the rule of Ali-Morad Khan Zand (r. 1781–1785), he started writing again, naming his historical chronicle Golshan-e Morad after the new Zand ruler. Despite changing his career path to that of a chronicler and scribe, Abu'l-Hasan never stopped painting, as demonstrated by handwritten and date-stamped paintings. Regarded as a skilled portrait artist, Abu'l-Hasan used "al-Mostawfi" as his signature.

Abu'l-Hasan died in c. 1797/98. He was the great paternal uncle of Farrokh Khan and Abu'l-Hasan Sani al-Mulk.

== Gallery ==
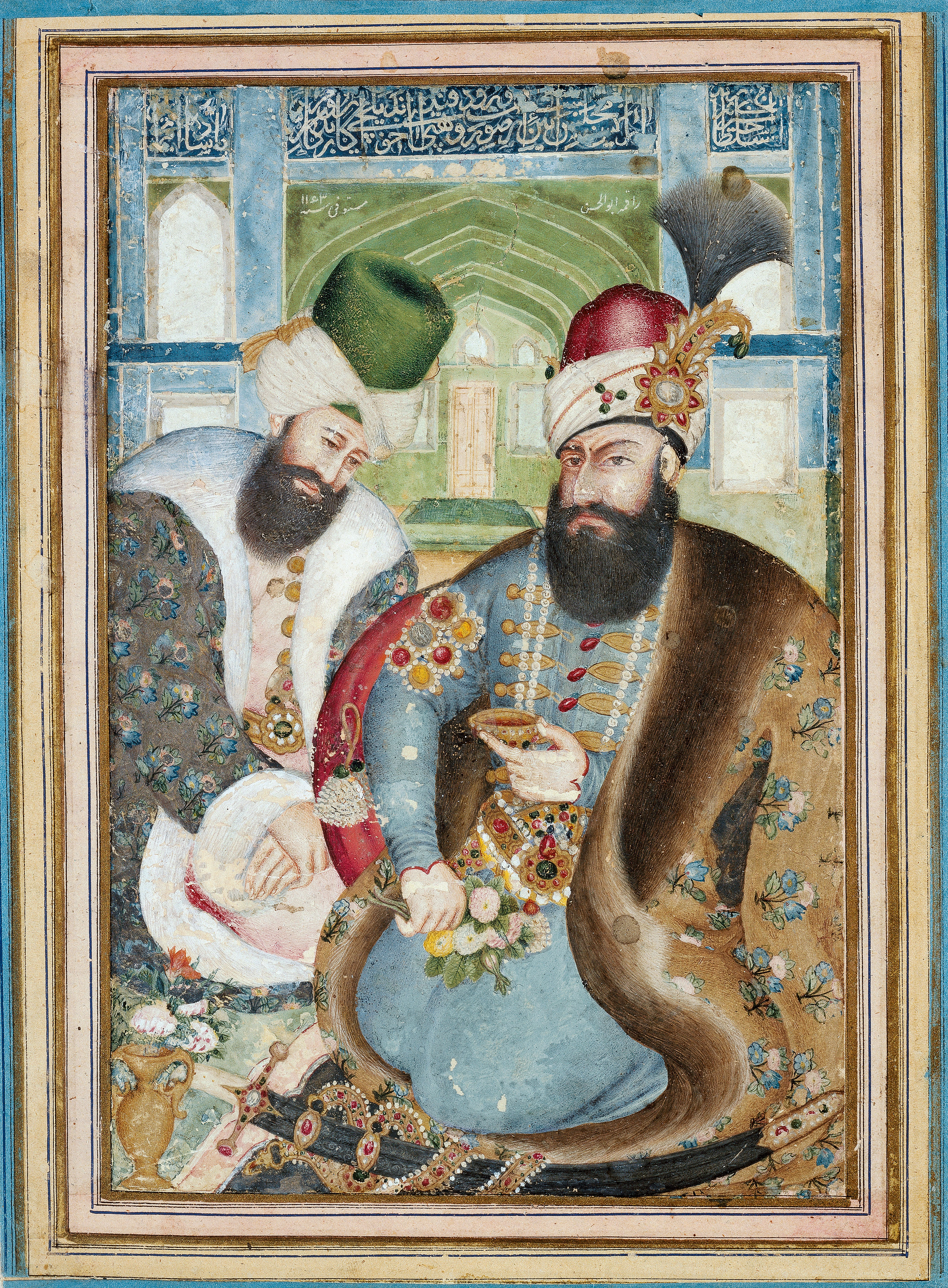
Karim Khan with the Ottoman envoy Vehbi Efendi, dated 1775

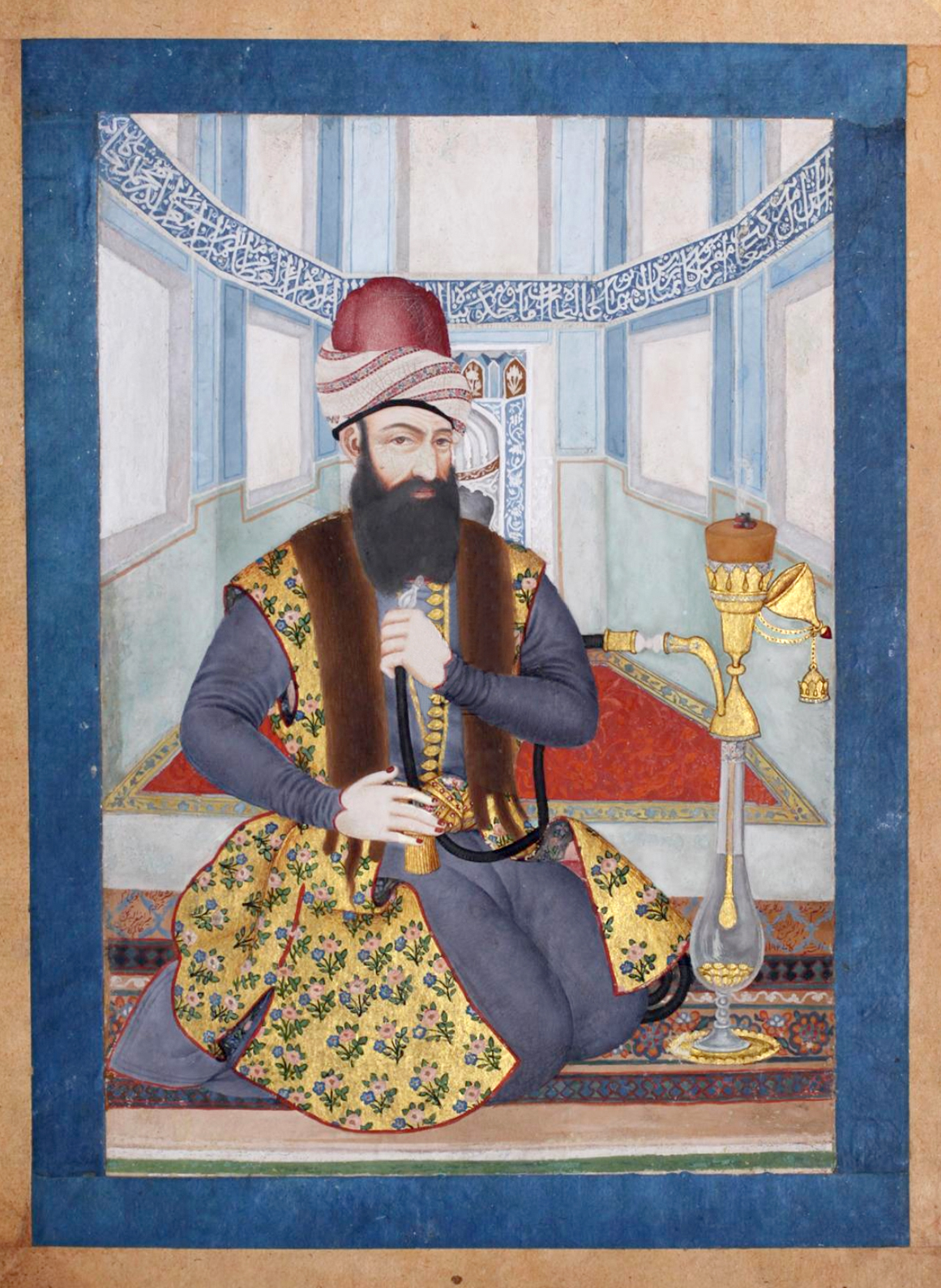
Mu'izz al-Din Mustawfi Ghaffari governor of Kashan, unfinished watercolour, 1781/82

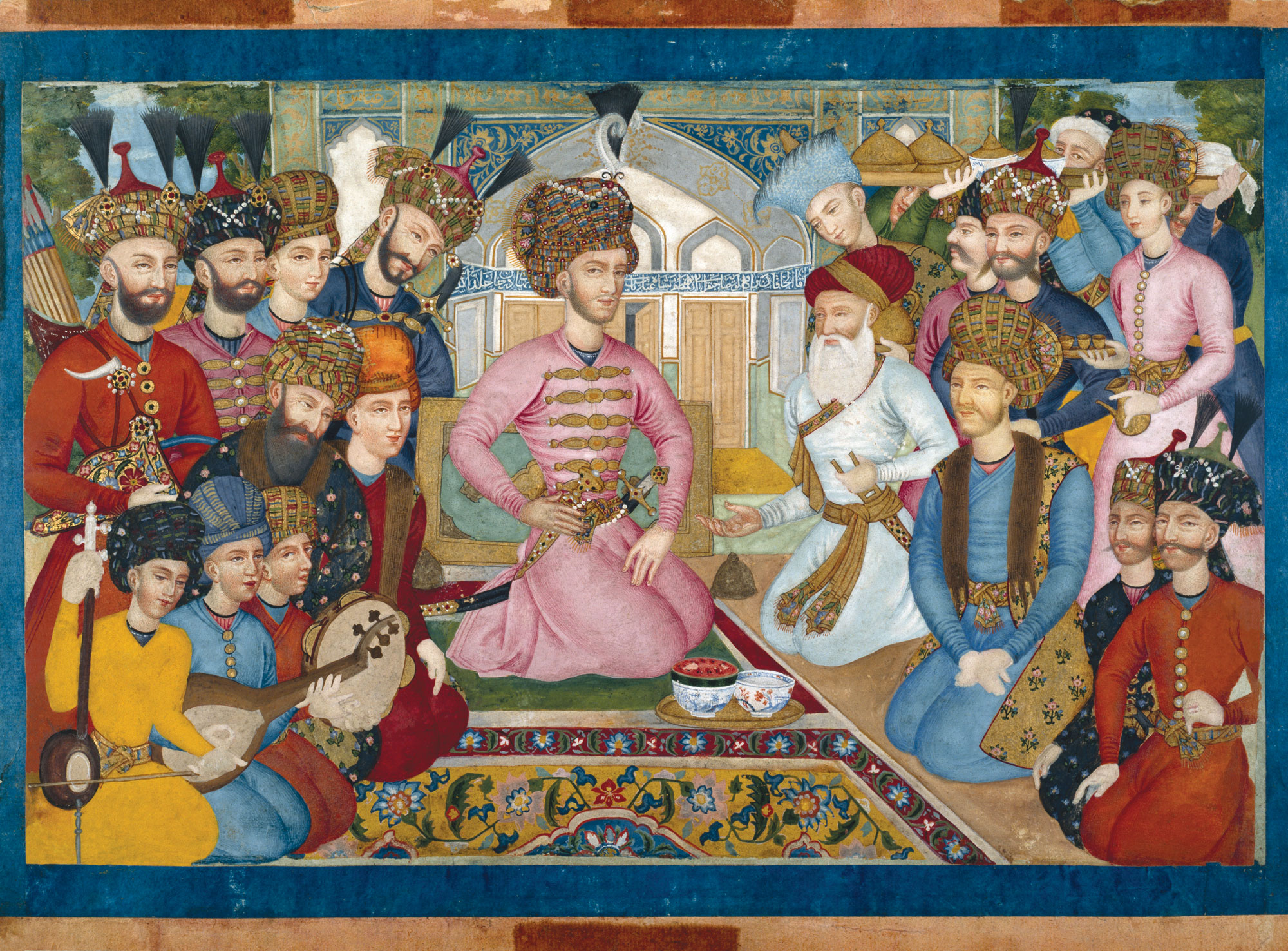
Shah Abbas II negotiating with an ambassador of the Mughal Empire, c. 1780–94

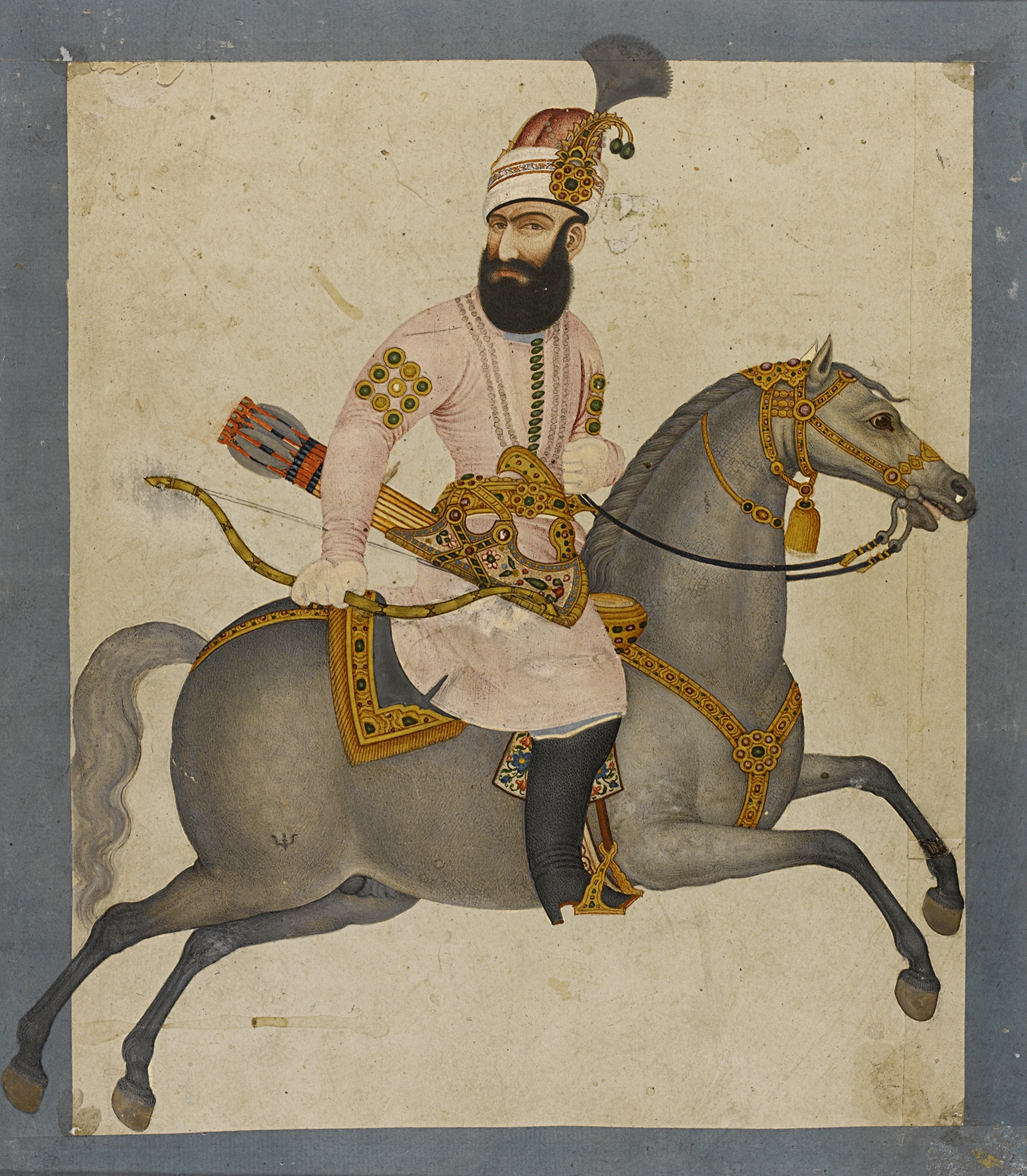
A late 18th-century portrait of Karim Khan Zand on horseback

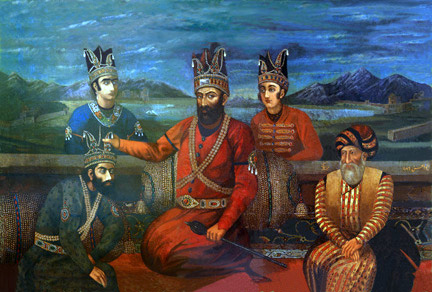
The investiture of Crown Prince Reza Qoli Mirza by his father Nader Shah, 1775/76

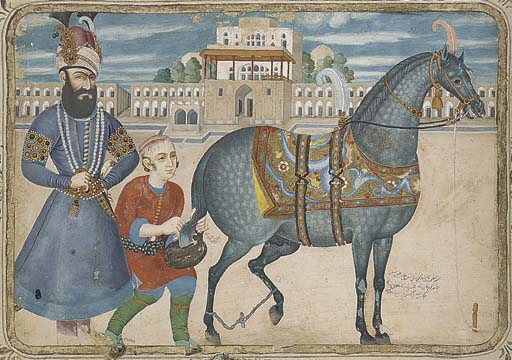
Karim Khan Zand with his horse and its groom, 1794

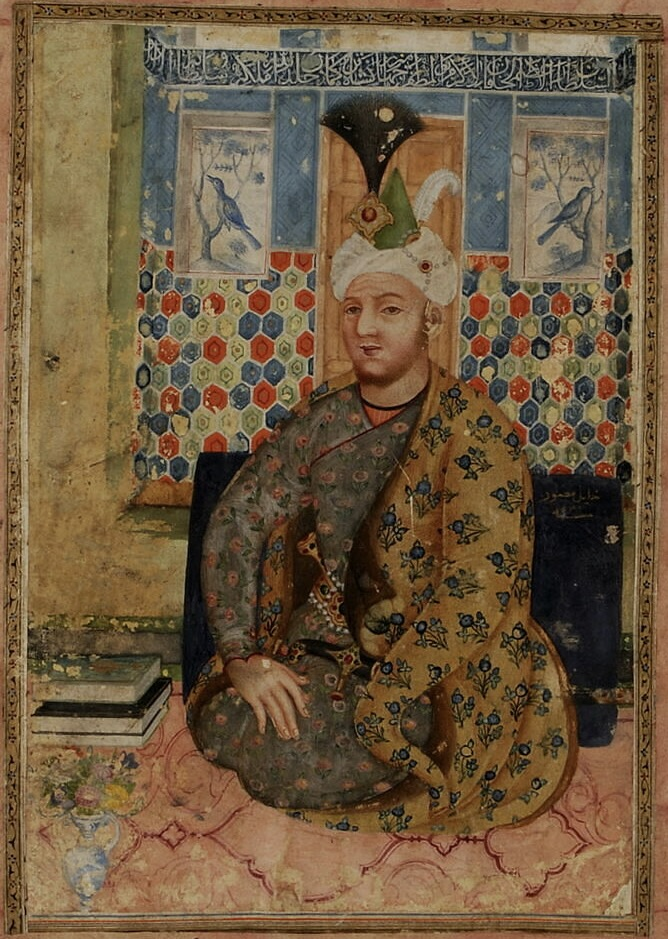
Portrait of Qara Qoyunlu ruler, Jahan Shah, 1780-1795

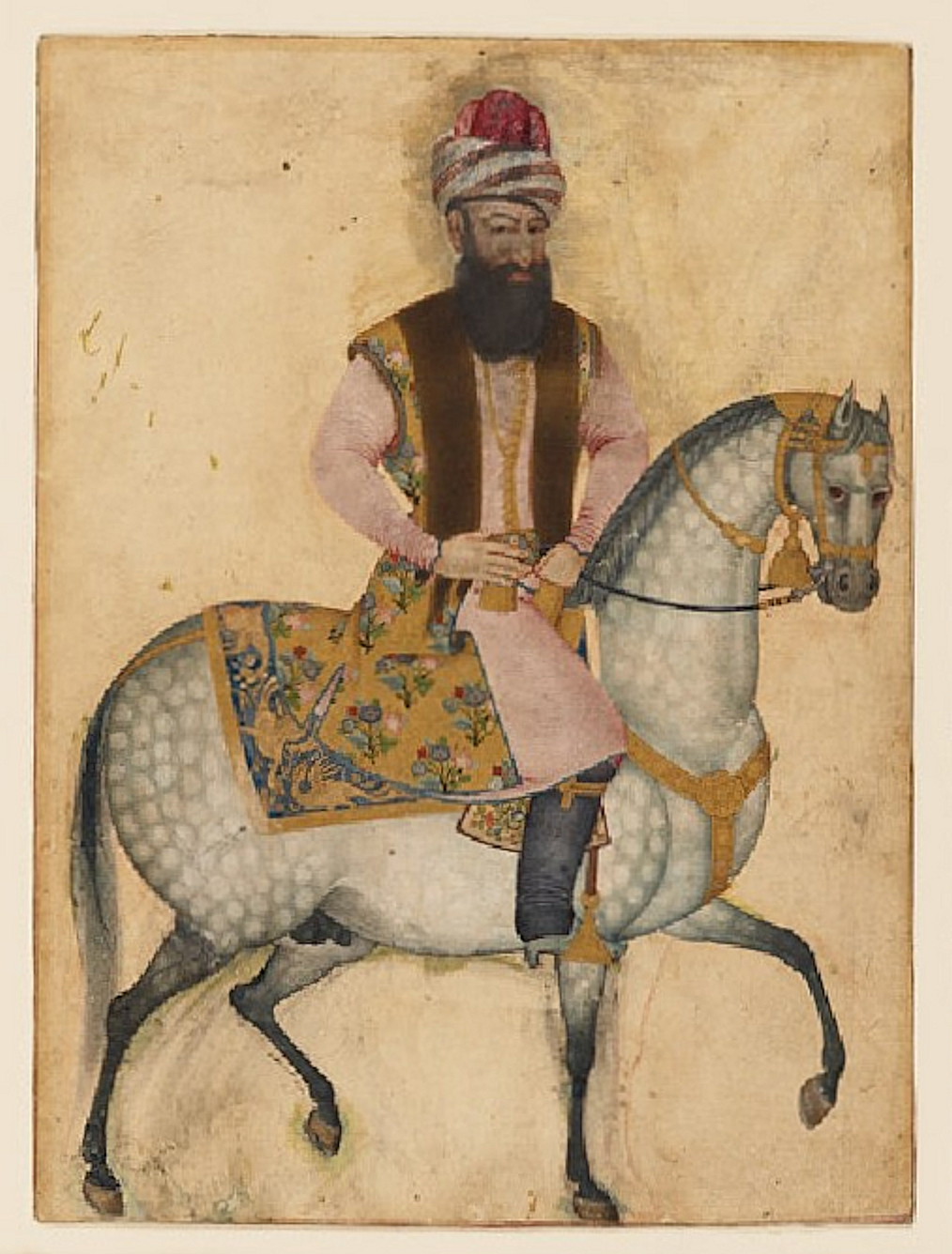
Portrait of Moezuddin Mostawfi Ghaffari, governor of Kashan and father of Abolhassan Ghaffari

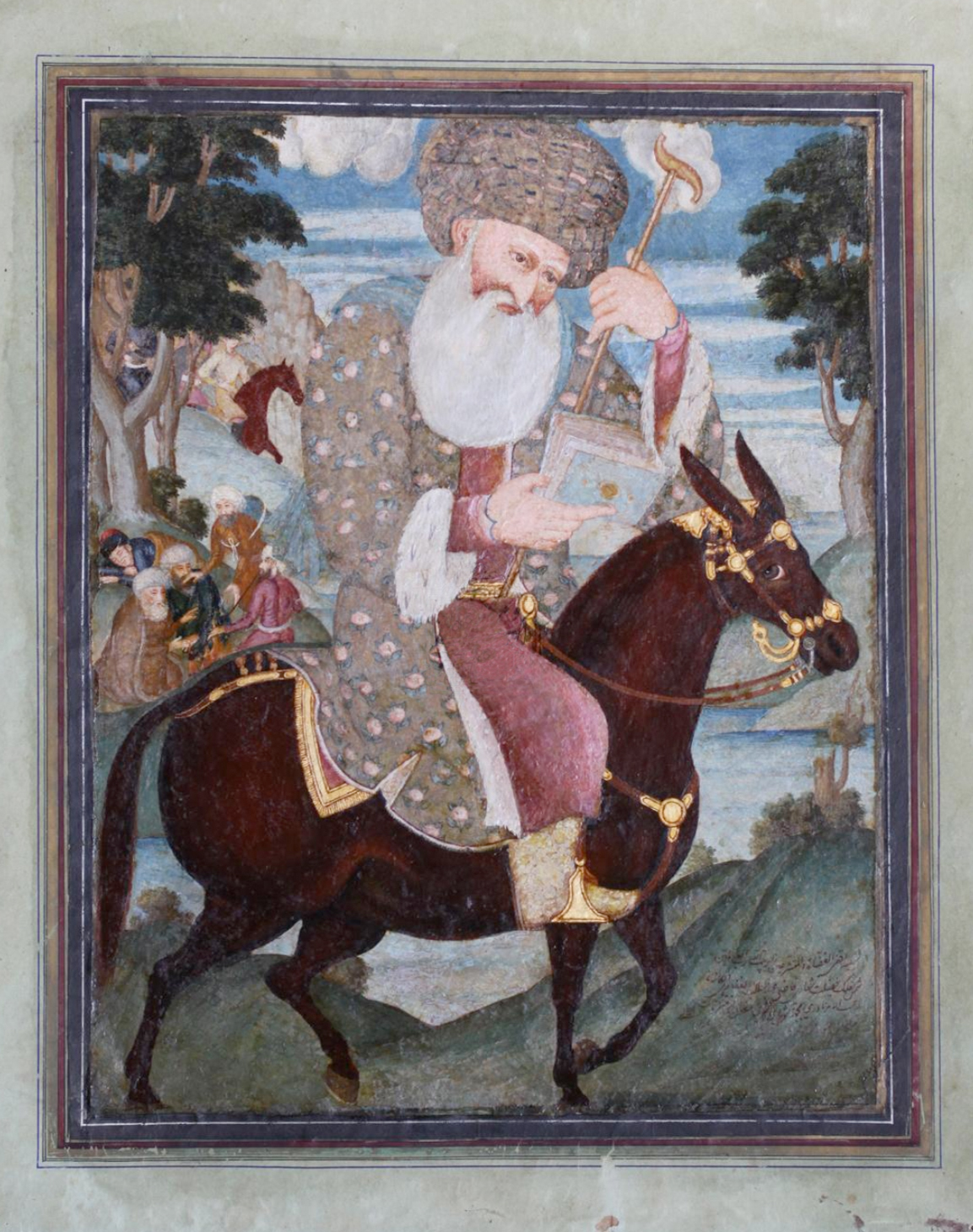
Abdul Muttalib Ghaffari

== Sources ==
- Bloom, Jonathan; Blair, Sheila (2009). "Ghaffari". Grove Encyclopedia of Islamic Art & Architecture: Three-Volume Set. Oxford University Press. ISBN 978-0195309911.
- Dhoka', Yahya (2015). "Abū al-Ḥasan Mustawfī". In Madelung, Wilferd; Daftary, Farhad (eds.). Encyclopaedia Islamica Online. Brill Online. ISSN 1875-9831.
- Floor, Willem (1999). "Art (Naqqashi) and Artists (Naqqashan) in Qajar Persia". Muqarnas. 13. Brill: 125–154. doi:10.2307/1523268. JSTOR 1523268. (registration required)
- Gaffary, F. (1983). "Abu'l-Ḥasan Mostawfī". In Yarshater, Ehsan (ed.). Encyclopædia Iranica. Vol. I/3: Ablution, Islamic–Abū Manṣūr Heravı̄. London and New York: Routledge & Kegan Paul. p. 311. ISBN 978-0-71009-092-8.
- Perry, John R. (1979). Karim Khan Zand: A History of Iran, 1747–1779. University of Chicago Press. ISBN 978-0226660981.
- Perry, John R. (2001). "Golšan-e morād". In Yarshater, Ehsan (ed.). Encyclopædia Iranica. Vol. XI/1: Giōni–Golšani. London and New York: Routledge & Kegan Paul. pp. 108–109. ISBN 978-0-933273-60-3.
