= Farrokh Khan =

Iranian official (1812–1871)

Farrokh Khan Amin od-Dowleh
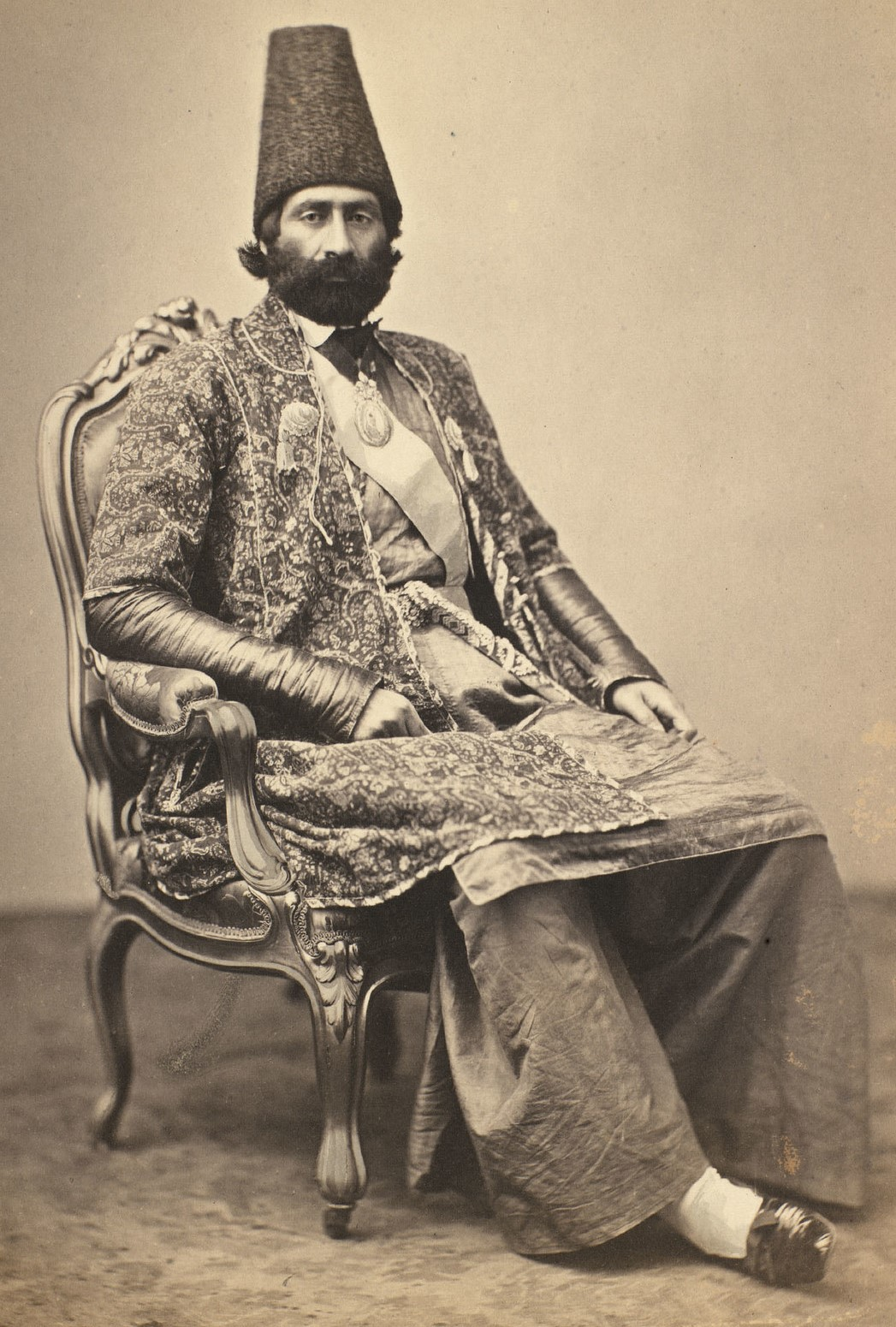
- Full length portrait of Farrokh Khan, dated 1857

Personal details
- Born: 1812 Qajar Iran
- Died: 5 May 1871 (aged 58–59) Qajar Iran
- Resting place: Fatima Masumeh Shrine, Qom
- Children: Mohammad-Ebrahim Khan Ghaffari; Mehdi Khan Ghaffari
- Relatives: Abu'l-Hasan Mostawfi Ghaffari (granduncle); Mirza Hashem Khan Ghaffari (brother); Abu'l-Hasan Sani al-Mulk (cousin); Abu Torab Ghaffari (cousin); Kamal-ol-molk (cousin); Khorshid Khanum Ghaffari (aunt)
- Writing career
- Language: Persian
- Notable work: Makhzan ol-Vaqaye

Farrokh Khan (Persian: فرخ خان; 1812 – 5 May 1871), also known as Amin od-Dowleh (امین‌الدوله), was a high-ranking Iranian official from the Ghaffari family. Between 1855–1857, he served as the Iranian ambassador to the French court in Paris, where he assisted in signing the Treaty of Paris, thus ending the losing Anglo-Persian War and withdrawing the Iranian army from Herat.

Farrokh Khan began his career at the court as a personal assistant to the Qajar shah (king) Fath-Ali Shah (r. 1797–1834). In 1833, he took part in the siege of Herat under the orders of the crown prince Abbas Mirza and later suppressed uprisings in the Mazandaran province, Isfahan, and Gilan province. He documented the Iranian army's actions during the 1838 siege of Herat and became the national tax collector in 1850. He was appointed as the personal treasurer of Naser al-Din Shah (r. 1848–1896) in 1854. Farrokh Khan negotiated with British diplomats in Paris during Iran's conflict with Britain over Herat and later signed the Treaty of Paris in 1857, which ended the war and required Iran to leave Herat and abandon all claims to Afghanistan. He also established diplomatic ties with the United States, engaged with European nations, and promoted educational progress by persuading Naser al-Din Shah to send 42 students abroad to Europe.

Over the course of his over two-year diplomatic mission, Farrokh Khan instructed his secretary Hoseyn Sarabi to assist him in writing a diary of his trips, titled Makhzan ol-Vaqaye ("The Treasury of Events"). Initially unpublished, this travelogue caught the attention of the Qajar shah and other Iranian court members, and eventually became crucial for historians exploring the international politics of that period. Scholars have found Farrokh Khan's interactions with Western dignitaries, including Napoleon III, Leopold I of Belgium, and Queen Victoria, along with his detailed diplomatic narratives, to be of high importance.

In Tehran, Kashan, and other places, Farrokh Khan led various building projects, including the Amin od-Dowleh Caravansarai in Kashan, which has been described as "a splendid example of Persian architecture." He died from a heart attack on 5 May 1871, and was buried in the Fatima Masumeh Shrine in Qom.

== Background ==
Born in 1812, Farrokh Khan was part of the prominent Ghaffari family of the city of Kashan, which had produced government officials, artists and jurists in Iran. He was the son of a certain Mohammad Mehdi, and was the brother of the government official Mirza Hashem Khan Ghaffari. He was the great-nephew of the painter and historian Abu'l-Hasan Mostawfi Ghaffari and cousin of the painters Abu'l-Hasan Sani al-Mulk, Abu Torab Ghaffari and Kamal-ol-molk.

== Career ==
=== Early career ===
During his childhood, he was part of the court of the Qajar shah (king) Fath-Ali Shah (r. 1797–1834), serving as his personal assistant. In the summer of 1833, under the orders of the crown prince Abbas Mirza, Farrokh Khan participated in the siege of Herat, led by the Qajar prince Mohammad Mirza (later known by his regnal name Mohammad Shah, r. 1834–1848). Herat, a frontier vassalage barely under Iranian control, was seen by the Qajars as an integral part of the Guarded Domains of Iran. The Durrani ruler of Herat, Kamran Shah Durrani, an Iranian vassal, now formed an alliance with the British. The siege was lifted in November 1833 due to the death of Abbas Mirza, with Kamran Shah Durrani agreeing to pay a yearly tribute to Tehran. In 1836, Mohammad Shah dispatched Farrokh Khan to the Mazandaran province to suppress a local uprising, which he succeeded in. He was sent to Isfahan the next year and Gilan in 1839 to deal with similar problems.

Meanwhile, Mohammad Shah had renewed the Iranian attempt to capture Herat. In 1838, he ordered Farrokh Khan to compile a review on the actions of the Iranian army during the siege of Herat. In 1850, Farrokh Khan was appointed as the tax collector of the whole country by the premier Amir Kabir. In 1854, Farrokh Khan became the personal treasurer of Mohammad Shah's son and successor Naser al-Din Shah Qajar (r. 1848–1896).

=== Diplomatic mission in Europe ===
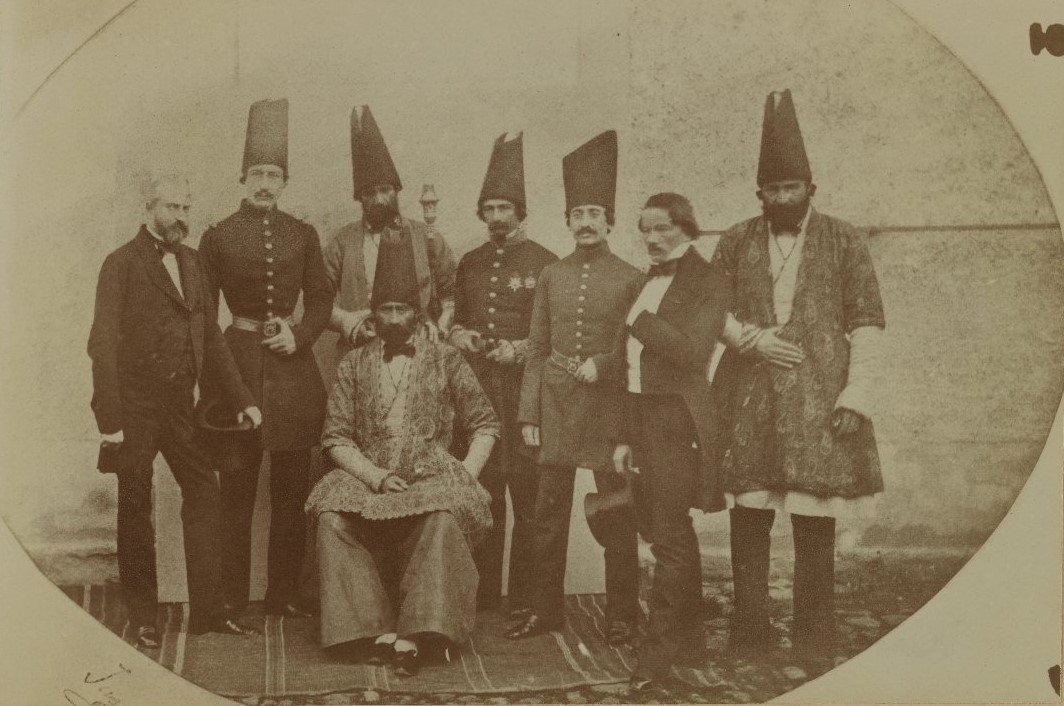
Farrokh Khan (seated), surrounded by his retinue and French officials

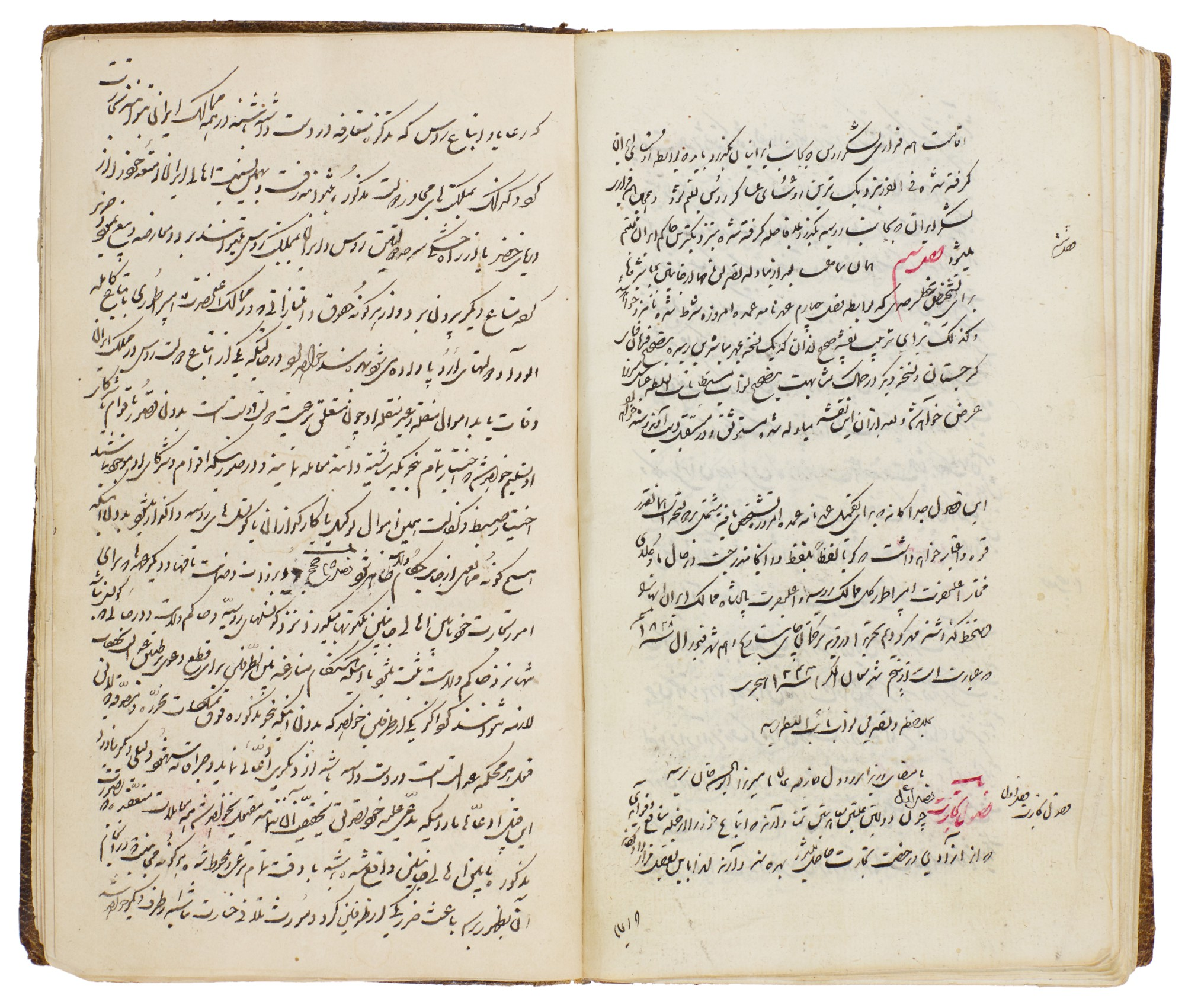
A compilation of summaries of treaties concluded between Iran and Britain, France and Russia, prepared for Farrokh Khan. Dated mid-19th century

On 18 March 1855, the Barakzai ruler Dost Mohammad Khan (r. 1826–1863) signed the Treaty of Peshawar with the British Empire, which acknowledged him as ruler of all of Afghanistan. Part of the purpose of this deal was to prevent Iranian plans for Herat. Now fully supported by the British, Dost Mohammad Khan announced his plan to march on Herat. Fearing a lack of Iranian support, the new ruler of Herat, Mohammad-Yusuf Mirza, defected to the British after nearly being overthrown by the locals, who had almost succeeded in overthrowing him and had ousted the Iranian army out of the citadel.

In November 1855, diplomatic relations between Iran and Britain broke down following a series of heated exchanges. Naser al-Din Shah Qajar took advantage of the situation to quickly gather his troops and send them to besiege Herat for the third time. As part of his two-pronged strategy of military operations and diplomacy, Naser al-Din Shah sent Farrokh Khan as an ambassador to discuss Iran's demands for the end of the Herat conflict with the British diplomats in Paris and Constantinople. He was also instructed to approach the United States for military assistance and a loan. In October 1856, Herat was conquered by the Iranian army with the assistance of the tunnels dug by the French army engineer M. Buhler.

However, the Iranian success proved brief. Negotiations in Constantinople soon broke down, leading to intrusion on the Iranian city of Bushehr by a large contingent of British and Indian troops in December 1856. In February 1857, they defeated the Iranian army at the Battle of Khushab. Naser al-Din Shah and his premier Mirza Aqa Khan Nuri ordered Farrokh Khan to accept the extreme British demands for peace and the ultimate restoration of diplomatic relations, as they were burdened with an empty war treasury and a chance of political disaster. Farrokh Khan signed the Treaty of Paris on 4 March 1857. This put an end to the war, forcing the Iranian army to leave Herat, relinquish all claims to Afghanistan and acknowledge their independence. In return, the British government pledged to use its power to mediate disputes between Afghanistan and Iran. The British strategic interests in Afghanistan, was an early consequence of the Great Game (the competition for control of Central Asia between the British and Russian Empires). It ultimately brought an end to Qajar hopes to preserve Herat as a frontier vassalage, after more than fifty years of engagement. Three and a half centuries of nearly continuous, although frequently chaotic, inclusion of Herat as part of Iran came to an end with the Treaty of Paris.

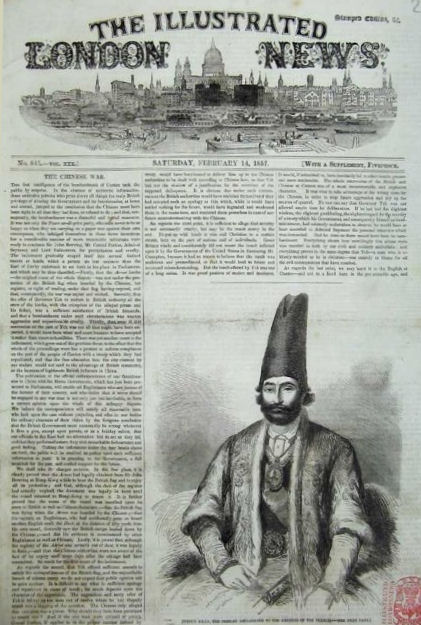
Farrokh Khan on the cover of a page from The Illustrated London News, dated 1857

The Qajar government realized the serious repercussions of confronting a European colonial power militarily after the conflict in Herat. The Iranians realized that in the age of empires, they would have to endure losing territory on their peripheries in order to protect their center.

According to the Iranologist Abbas Amanat, Farrokh Khan was the biggest factor for the "relative leniency" of the treaty, stating that he "was a man of caution and common sense who sustained his consistency and composure in spite of the premier's vacillations, the shah's sunken morale, and British intransigence." The French emperor Napoleon III, his minister of foreign affairs, Alexandre Colonna-Walewski, and other French diplomats also helped the Iranians with the negotiations. Napoleon III—possibly being altruistic according to Amanat—persuaded Farrokh Khan to make a quick settlement by claiming that the British would do whatever to achieve their goals in Afghanistan.

Naser al-Din Shah was aware of the war's domestic effects to some extent. He encouraged Farrokh Khan to personally approach Queen Victoria, pleading with her to grant his "friendly request" and return thirty guns that had been looted as war booty from the Iranian army in Bushehr and Mohammerah. According to Amanat, this displayed Naser al-Din Shah's "concern for royal prestige." Farrokh Khan declined his request, considering it improper and at contrast with diplomatic norms. He responded by advising Naser al-Din Shah to have "Power and discipline, so that all nations will see how far the government of Iran cares for the organization of its army, the development of the country, the tranquility of its subjects, and the fortification of its ports." Amanat adds that Farrokh Khan's rejection was "a sad reflection of the contrast between the world the shah knew and the world his envoy had come to know."

Farrokh Khan made friendship treaties with various European nations during stay in Europe. Mirza Malkam Khan, an Iranian Armenian who studied in Paris, served as his advisor due to his knowledge of French and Paris. The first diplomatic ties between Iran and the United States were established in December 1856 due to his efforts. Farrokh Khan also became a member of the Freemasonic organization Grand Orient de France after being greatly inspired by the political, social, and technological advancements of the European nations.

Once Farrokh Khan reached Constantinople on his way back to Iran, Mirza Aqa Khan Nuri, suspecting that Farrokh Khan's successful diplomatic mission in Europe would make him a powerful competitor for the position of premier, maneuvered to delay him. Mirza Malkam Khan, who had already departed for Iran, had contributed to these suspicions. In 1858, Farrokh Khan was back in Tehran, where he was given a special welcoming ceremony by Naser al-Din Shah.

=== Later career ===
In December 1858, Farrokh Khan was appointed as the Minister in Presence (chamberlain), holder of the personal seal of the shah, and the leader of the Imperial servants. With the belief that advancement was imperative for Iran, Farrokh Khan convinced Naser al-Din Shah to send 42 students to Europe receive instruction in science and technology under the supervision of prominent Persophile Aleksander Chodźko.

In April 1859, Farrokh Khan was appointed as the minister of interior and given the title of given the title of Amin ol-Dowleh. Farrokh Khan gave Naser al-Din Shah a pamphlet titled "Suggested Reforms for the Improvement of the Administration and the Army and for the Establishment of a Parliament and a Cabinet" that was authored under his own name, though it was likely written by Mirza Malkam Khan. Farrokh Khan was also given the task of mentoring for Naser al-Din Shah's eldest son Mass'oud Mirza Zell-e Soltan. In the same year, Farrokh Khan became part of the council of state. He was considered "the most influential man" by Sir Henry Rawlinson, who was the British ambassador in Tehran from 1859 to 1860. He was also described as "a very clever statesman" by the French ambassador Arthur de Gobineau.

With the new British minister Charles Alison and the legation secretary Edward Eastwick, Farrokh Khan conducted important negotiations about Bahrain. Although Naser al-Din Shah initially considered Farrokh Khan for the position of premier in 1866, he ultimately appointed Mirza Mohammad Khan Sepahsalar. In May 1866, Farrokh Khan was once again given the position of Minister in Presence as well as the governorship of Isfahan, Fars, central Iran, and head of the customs department. In the early spring of 1867, he was appointed as the minister of the court.

In Tehran, Kashan, and other places, Farrokh Khan constructed numerous caravanserai, bazaars, homes, and mosques. His Amin od-Dowleh Caravansarai in Kashan is described by the Iranian historian F. Gaffary as "a splendid example of Persian architecture." Farrokh Khan died from a heart attack on 5 May 1871, and was buried in the Fatima Masumeh Shrine in Qom. He was survived by three sons. Two of them—Mohammad-Ebrahim Khan Ghaffari and Mehdi Khan Ghaffari—became distinguished figures.

== Travelogue ==
Over the course of his over two-year diplomatic mission, Farrokh Khan instructed his secretary Hoseyn Sarabi to assist him in writing a diary of his trips titled Makhzan ol-Vaqaye ("The Treasury of Events"). Initially unpublished, this travelogue caught the attention of the Qajar shah and other Iranian court members, and eventually became crucial for historians exploring the international politics of that period. Scholars have found Farrokh Khan's interactions with Western dignitaries, including Napoleon III, Leopold I of Belgium, and Queen Victoria, along with his detailed diplomatic narratives, to be of high importance.

The travelogue was first published in 1982, consisting of two volumes. Farrokh Khan's diplomatic mission is described in the first, and the legislative and administrative structures of the European nations are described in the second. It is unclear how much of an impact Hoseyn Sarabi had on the manuscript in comparison to Farrokh Khan, but he functions as a kind of ghost writer and frequently avoids making personal opinions known in his work. Parts of the book, however, only mention events that Hoseyn Sarabi could have known about from Farrokh Khan's accounts and did not physically take part in (such as Farrokh Khan's travels in Prussia and Italy). Farrokh Khan may have been more involved as the sections detailing these events are similar in tone and structure to the other sections of the travelogue. The travelogue's principal readers were the nobles and the shah. This meant that Farrokh Khan had to stay away from a lot of subjects and adhere to particular cultural norms, such as the occasional lines glorifying the shah.

Farrokh Khan was optimistic about the future of his country and expressed his respect for the English and Europeans in general for their forward-thinking and thoughtful approach to building a better society. He supported the claims of a French merchant, who was considering doing business in Iran; "Nowadays, it is widely known throughout Europe that the government of Iran has, in a short period of time, made as much progress as is possible in fifty years and, of course, in a short period hence will regain its status as one of the greatest governments in the world." According to the Iranologist M. R. Ghanoonparvar; "Such optimism should perhaps be expected of a high-ranking official of the Iranian government at the time, who was becoming increasingly aware of the progress in the West compared to the backward conditions in Iran and wished for such advancements in Iran as well."

Farrokh Khan's travelogue contains remarkably little information about actions that would be deemed inappropriate in his society, in contrast to other travelogues from the era. A toast honoring the shah is mentioned, but otherwise there is no discussion of prostitution, eroticization of women and their relationships with other men, or alcohol. According to the Iranian historian Vahid Vahdat; "Given the close observation and detailed descriptions of other matters in the memoir, it seems unlikely that this silence is accidental. The concealment of issues that fascinated most other travelers is probably best explained by Farrokh Khan's prominent position in the court and his need to avoid the hint of scandal. In addition, the text's obsession with propriety hints at its author's intention to bypass censorship when publishing the book – an effort that eventually fell short."

Nevertheless, the travelogue was ultimately banned by Mirza Aqa Khan Nuri, who sent Farrokh Khan a letter which said the following;

"I have heard that Hoseyn Sarabi, the secretary of the grand ambassador, has written a book, under your supervision, about the details of your trip to Europe, and that he intends to publish it in Tabriz. I should remind you that during his mission, Saif el-Mulk also decided to publish a similar book with the objective to educate people on the differences between the state of affairs in Iran and Europe, with which I disagreed. Certainly, you should not allow Hoseyn Sarabi to publish this book and distribute it all over. This will cause public awareness about Europe which is not appropriate."

Vahdat adds that "In addition to moral qualms, it seems likely that the officials of the court were concerned about the development of any "public awareness" of Farangestan that might seem to confirm Iran's backwardness and contribute to skepticism about the power of the regime."

== Sources ==
- Algar, Hamid (2023) [1973]. Mirza Malkum Khan: A Biographical Study in Iranian Modernism. University of California Press. ISBN 978-0520022171.
- Amanat, Abbas (1993). "Courts and courtiers vii. In the Qajar period". In Yarshater, Ehsan (ed.). Encyclopædia Iranica. Vol. VI/4: Cotton II–Čūb-bāzī. London and New York: Routledge & Kegan Paul. pp. 375–381. ISBN 978-1-56859-002-8.
- Amanat, Abbas (1997). Pivot of the Universe: Nasir Al-Din Shah Qajar and the Iranian Monarchy, 1831–1896. I.B. Tauris. ISBN 978-1845118280.
- Amanat, Abbas (2003). "Herat vi. The Herat question". In Yarshater, Ehsan (ed.). Encyclopædia Iranica. Vol. XII/2: Hedāyat al-mota'allemin–Herat VII. London and New York: Routledge & Kegan Paul. pp. 219–224. ISBN 978-0-933273-75-7.
- Amanat, Abbas (2017). Iran: A Modern History. Yale University Press. ISBN 978-0300112542.
- Bloom, Jonathan; Blair, Sheila (2009). "Ghaffari". Grove Encyclopedia of Islamic Art & Architecture: Three-Volume Set. Oxford University Press. ISBN 978-0195309911.
- Floor, Willem (1999). "Art (Naqqashi) and Artists (Naqqashan) in Qajar Persia". Muqarnas. 13. Brill: 125–154. doi:10.2307/1523268. ISSN 2211-8993. JSTOR 1523268. (registration required)
- Gaffary, F. (1984). "Amīn-al-dawla, Farroḵ Khan Ḡaffārī". In Yarshater, Ehsan (ed.). Encyclopædia Iranica (Online ed.). Encyclopædia Iranica Foundation. ISBN 978-0710090959.
- Gaffary, F. (1989). "Amīn-e ḵalwat". In Yarshater, Ehsan (ed.). Encyclopædia Iranica (Online ed.). Encyclopædia Iranica Foundation. ISBN 978-0710090959.
- Gösken, Urs (2018). "Mīrzā Malkum Khān". Christian-Muslim Relations. A Bibliographical History Volume 20. Iran, Afghanistan and the Caucasus (1800–1914). Brill. ISBN 978-9004471689.
- Ghanoonparvar, M. R. (2010) [1993]. In a Persian Mirror: Images of the West and Westerners in Iranian Fiction. University of Texas Press. ISBN 978-0292727618.
- Vahdat, Vahid (2017). Occidentalist Perceptions of European Architecture in Nineteenth-Century Persian Travel Diaries: Travels in Farangi Space. Taylor & Francis. ISBN 978-1472473943.
