= Abu Torab Ghaffari =

Iranian painter (1863–1890)

Mirza Abu Torab Ghaffari Khan
- میرزا ابوتراب‌خان غفاری
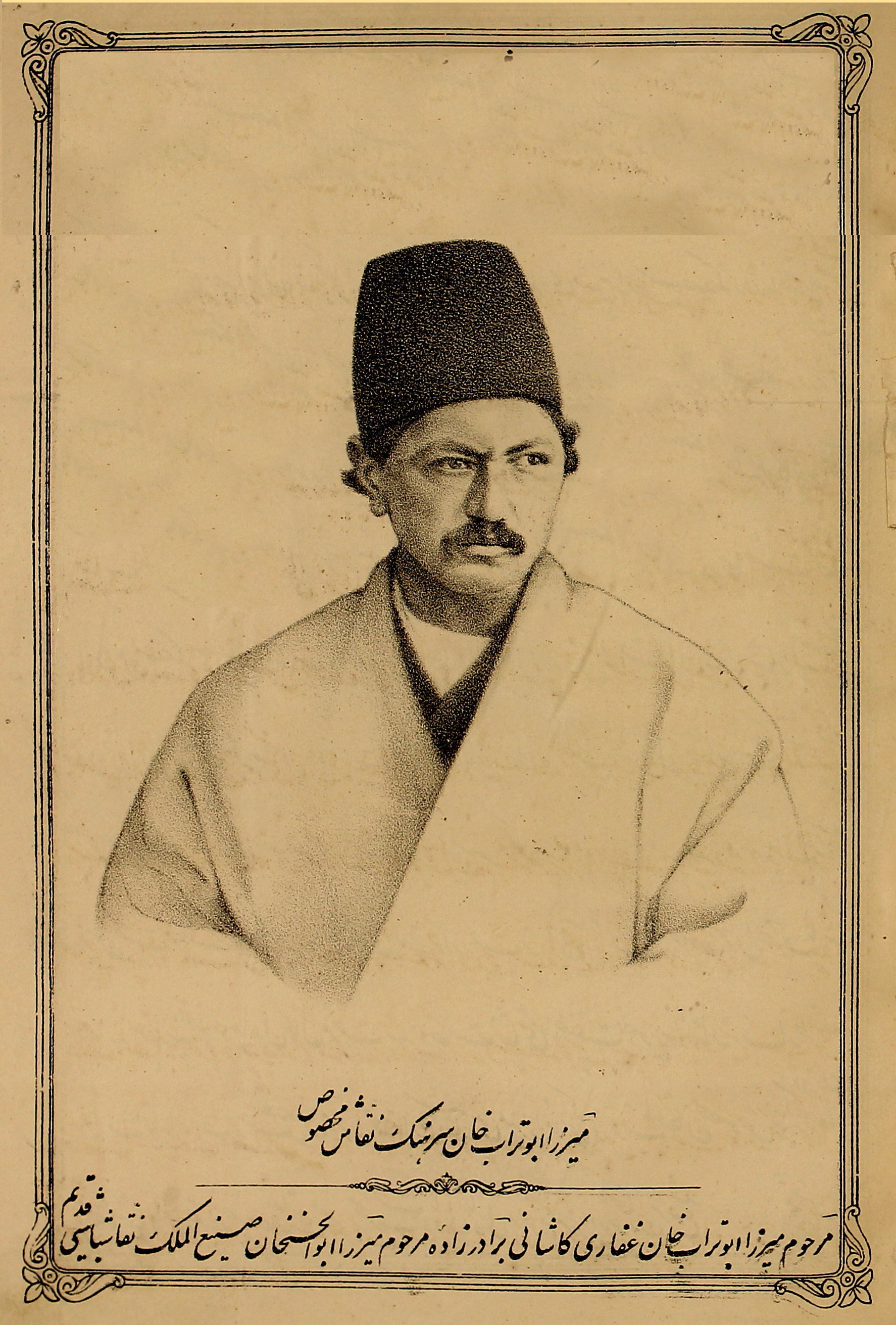
- Portrait of Abu Torab Ghaffari by Mirza Mousa
- Born: 1863
- Died: 11 March 1890 (aged 26–27)
- Occupations: Painter, Illustrator
- Era: Qajar era
- Relatives: Kamal-ol-molk (brother); Abu'l-Hasan Sani al-Mulk (paternal uncle)

Abu Torab Ghaffari (Persian: ابوتراب غفاری; 1863 – 11 March 1890) was a Qajar era Iranian painter from the Ghaffari family of Kashan who was active during the reign of Naser al-Din Shah Qajar (r. 1848–1896). He was a son of Mirza Bozorg Ghaffari and the brother of Kamal-ol-molk. He died on 11 March 1890 due to opium poisoning.

== Gallery ==
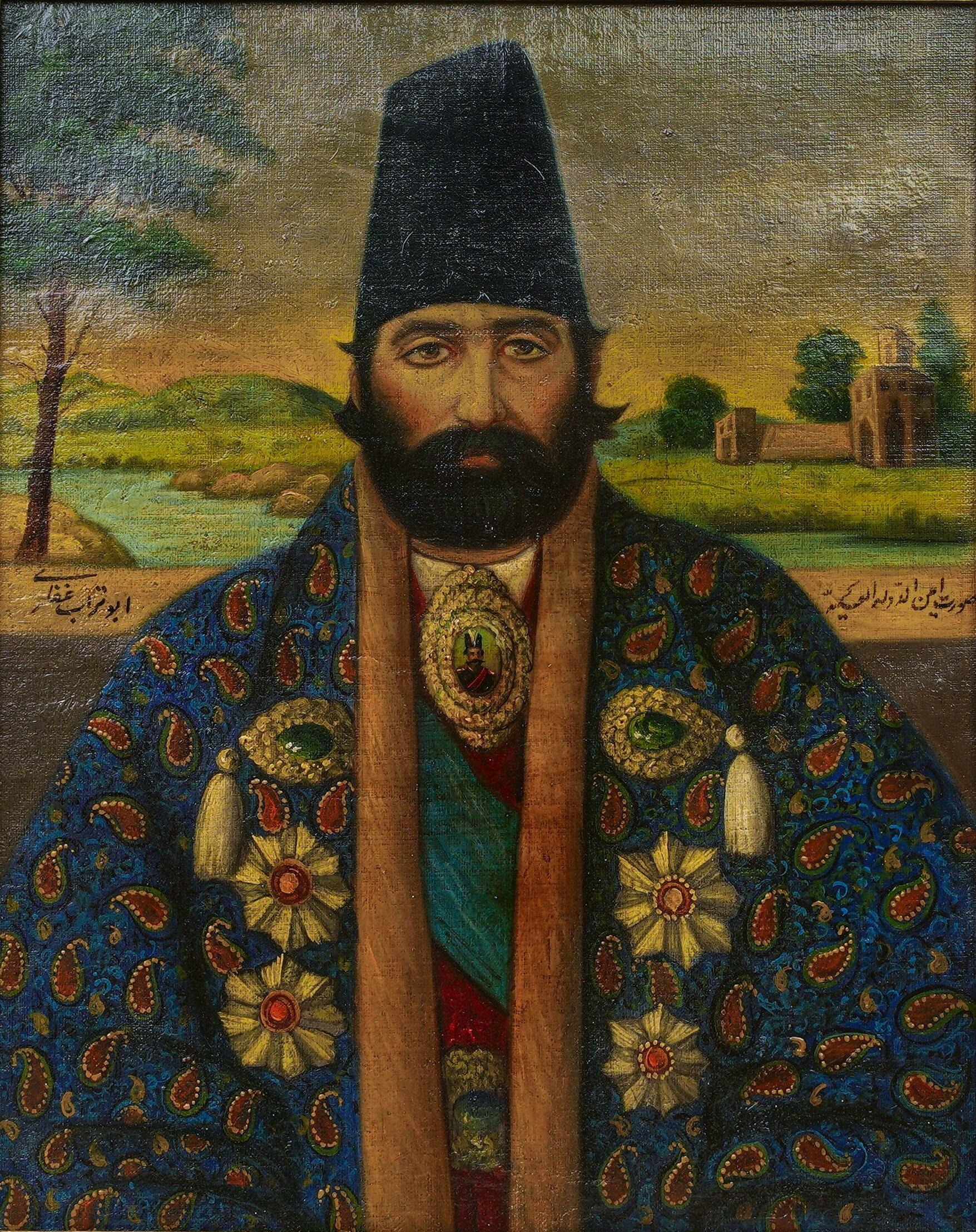
Portrait of Farrokh Khan

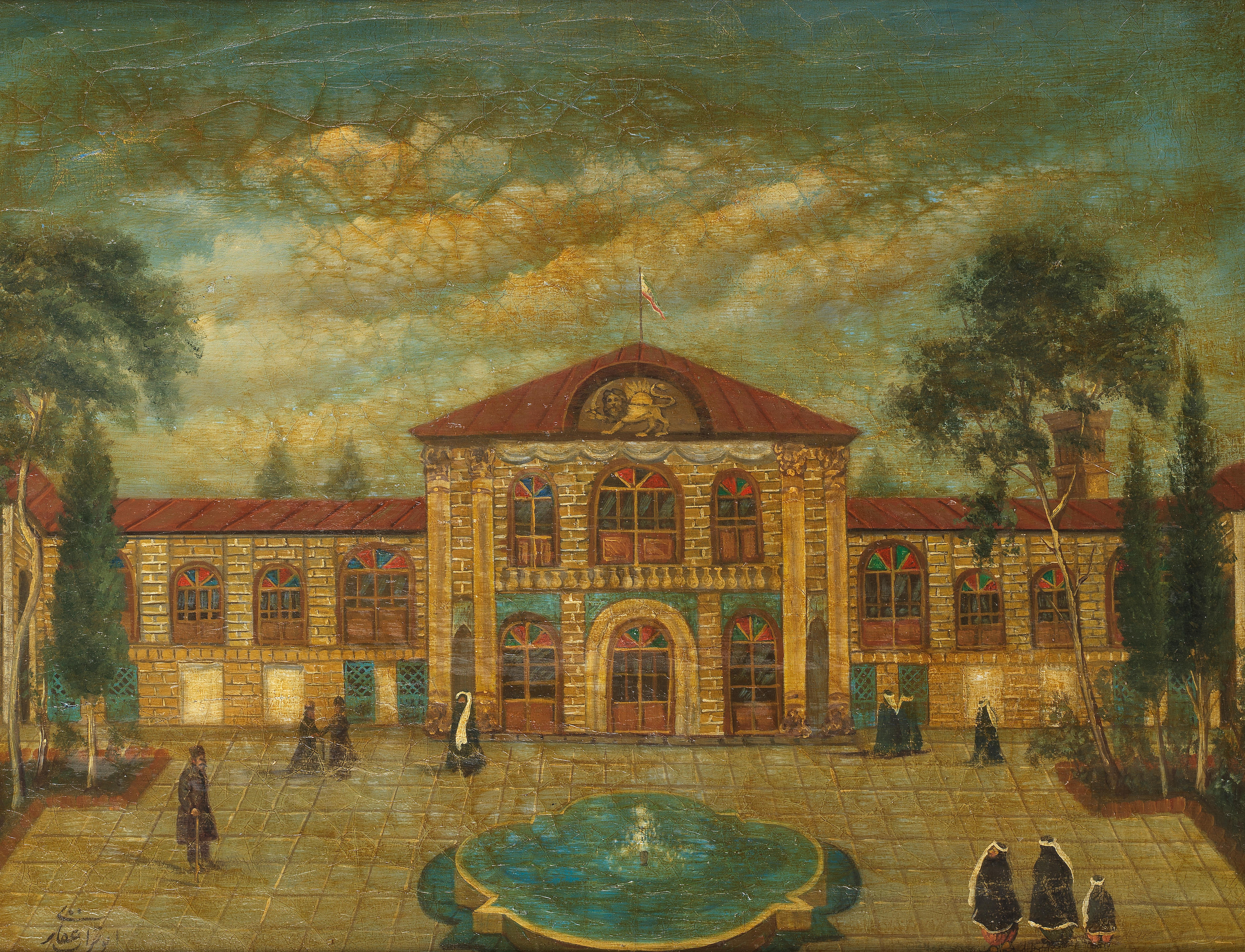
A view of a palace, c. 1880s, attributed to Abu Torab

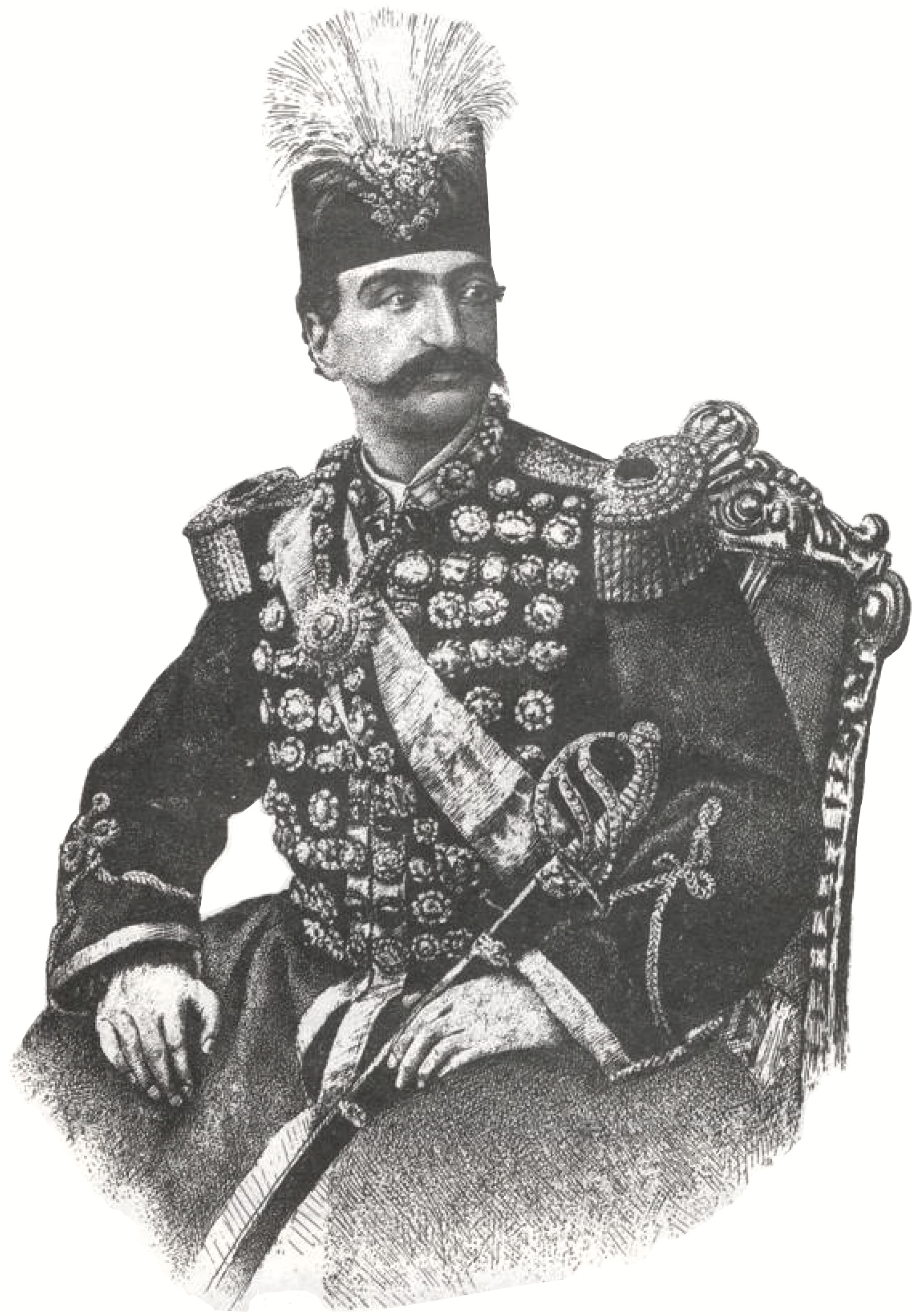
Naser al-Din Shah Qajar, 11 November 1882

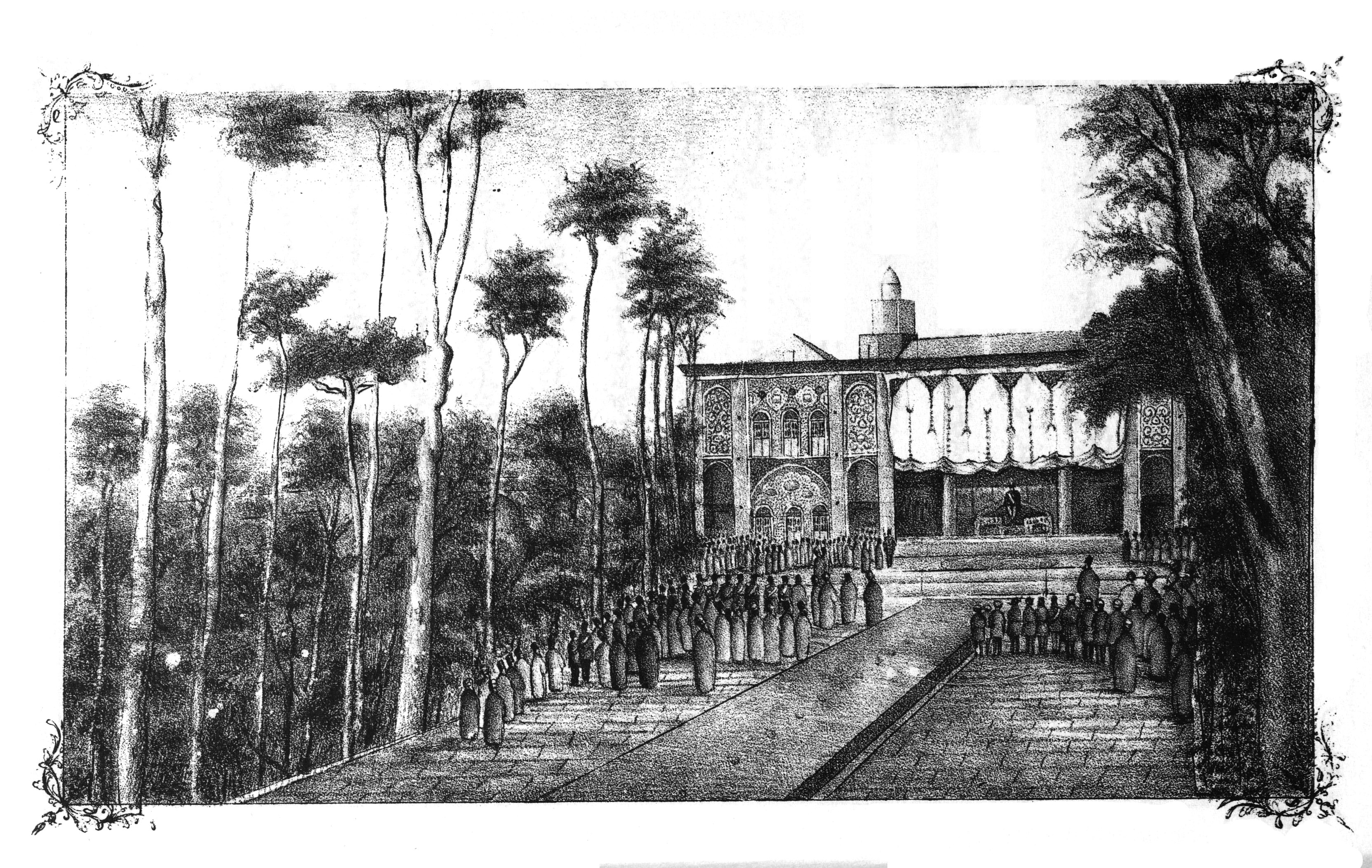
Golestan Palace, 13 October 1883

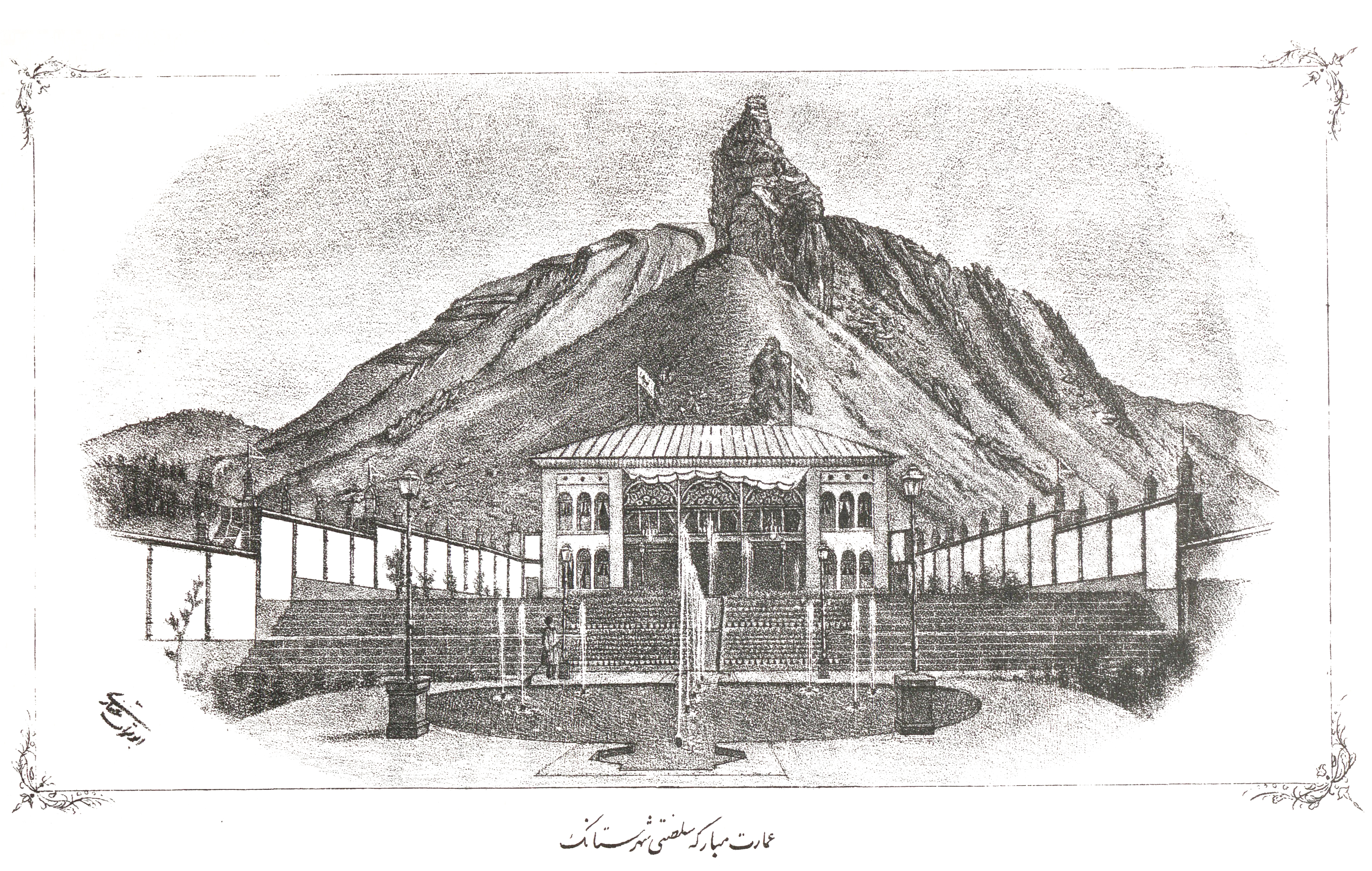
Shahrestanak Palace, 6 August 1884

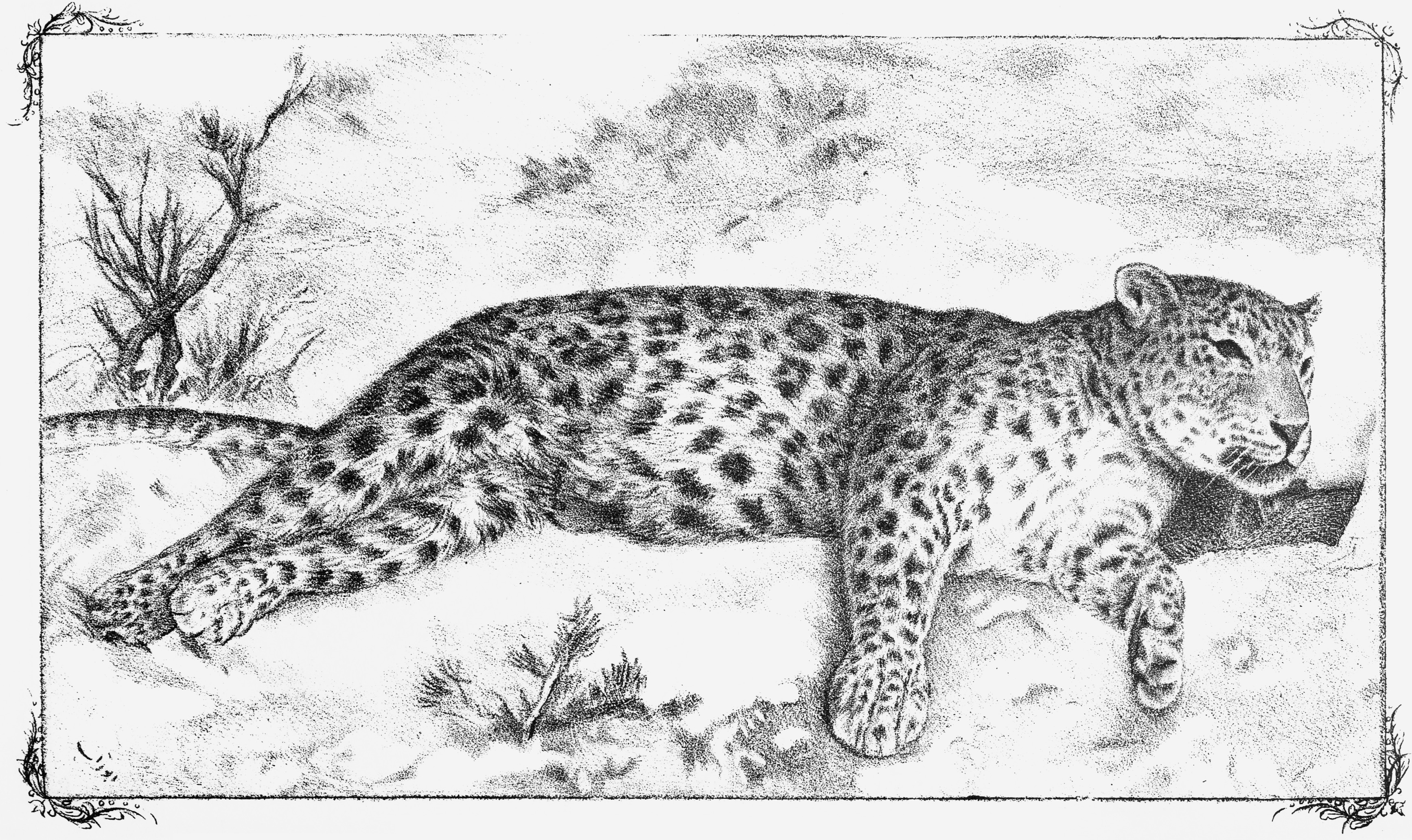
Jaguar hunted by Naser al-Din Shah, 12 November 1884

== Sources ==
- Floor, Willem (1999). "Art (Naqqashi) and Artists (Naqqashan) in Qajar Persia". Muqarnas. 13. Brill: 125–154. JSTOR 1523268. (registration required)
- Dhoka, Yahya (2015). "Abū Turāb Ghaffārī". In Madelung, Wilferd; Daftary, Farhad (eds.). Encyclopaedia Islamica Online. Brill Online. ISSN 1875-9831.
