= Mirza Taghikhan Kashani =

Iranian journalist

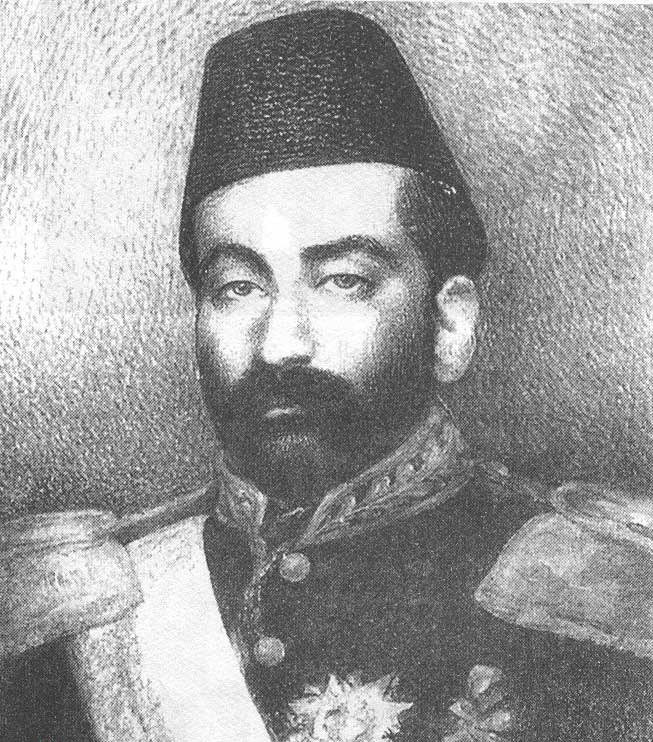
Mirza Taghikhan Kashani

Mirza Taghikhan Kashani (Persian: میرزا تقی‌خان کاشانی; titled: Hakim-Bāshi Zill-ul-sultān) was an Iranian writer and journalist during 19th century, Qajar era. He was the first to print articles about necessity of youth training in Fars newspaper in Shiraz and Farhang in Isfahan.

== See also ==
- Sani ol molk
