= Qajar coffee =

Type of poison in the form of coffee

Qajar coffee (Persian: قهوه قجری, romanized: Qahve-ye Qajari) was a type of poisoned coffee used in the court of Qajar Iran to kill the enemies of the government.

This method of removing opponents became popular especially after the reign of Naser al-Din Shah Qajar. Notably, his son Mass'oud Mirza Zell-e Soltan was notorious in using cyanide, arsenic acid or strychnine poisoned coffee to remove those who opposed him.

== Victims ==
These people are said to have died by consuming Qajar coffee:

1. Aqa Reza Khan Iqbal os-Saltaneh
2. Mirza Agha Khan Nuri, grand vizier
3. Mansur Nezam, constitutionalist and tribal leader
4. Abolfath Khan
5. Mirza Mohammad Khan Sepahsalar, grand vizier
6. Hossein Gholi Khan Ilkhani
7. Mirza Habibollah Khan Moshir ol-Molk, politician
8. Mirza Ali Khan, Treasurer
9. Mirza Mohammad Khan Amin od-Dowleh
10. Mirza Mohammad Hasan Sheikh ol-Eslam, cleric
