= Abu'l-Hasan Sani al-Mulk =

Iranian painter and miniature artist (1814–1866)

Mirza Abu'l-Hasan Ghaffari Kashani Sani al-Mulk
- ابوالحسن غفاری صنیع‌الملک
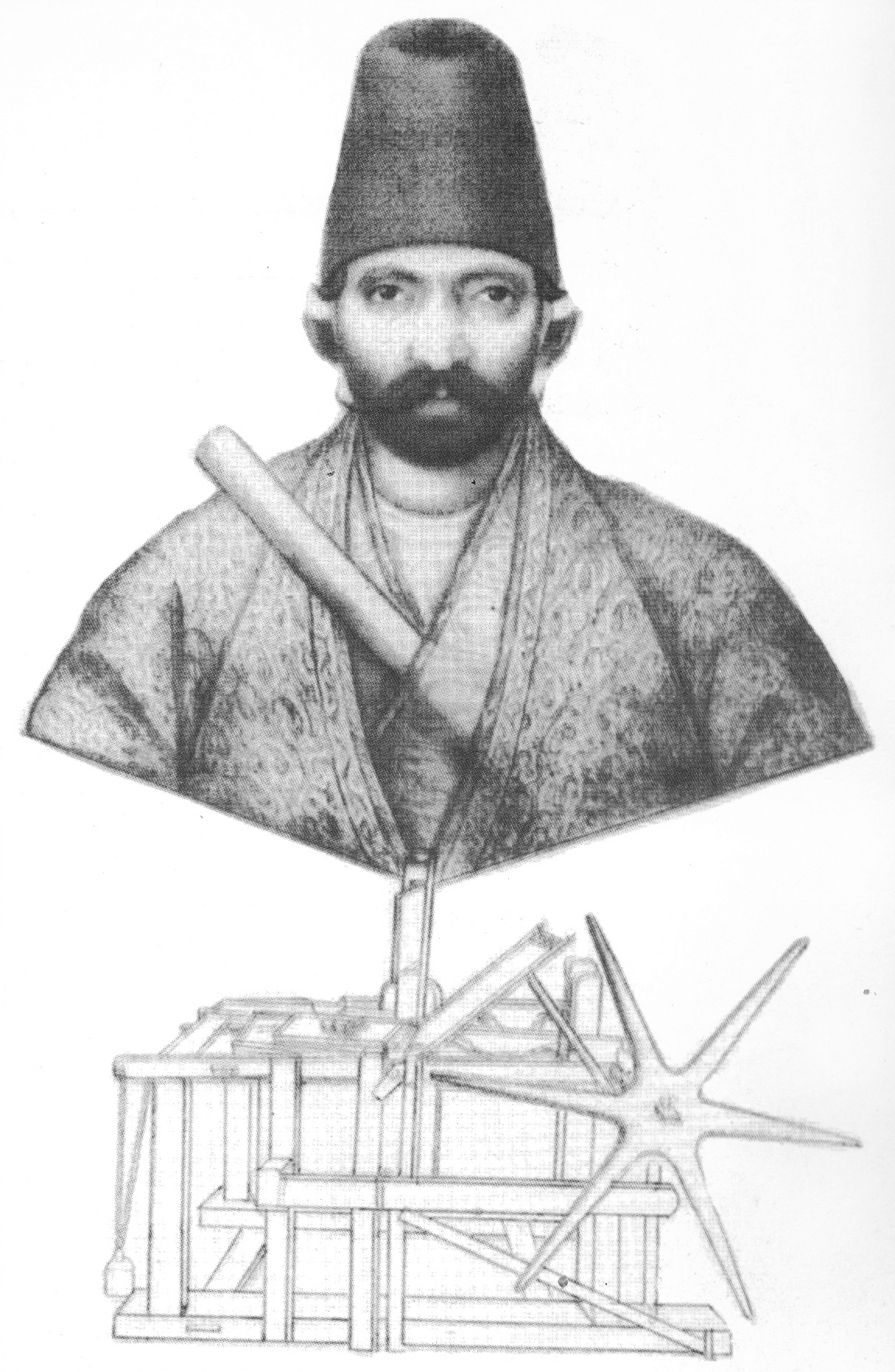
- Self-portrait of Abu'l-Hasan Khan Ghaffari Kashani
- Born: Abu'l-Hasan Ghaffari Kashani; 1814; Iran
- Died: 1866 (aged 51–52); Iran
- Era: Qajar Iran
- Employer: Qajar Royal Court
- Known for: Painting
- Title: Khan
- Children: Asadollah Khan, Seyfollah Khan, Yahya Khan
- Father: Mirza Mohammad Ghaffari

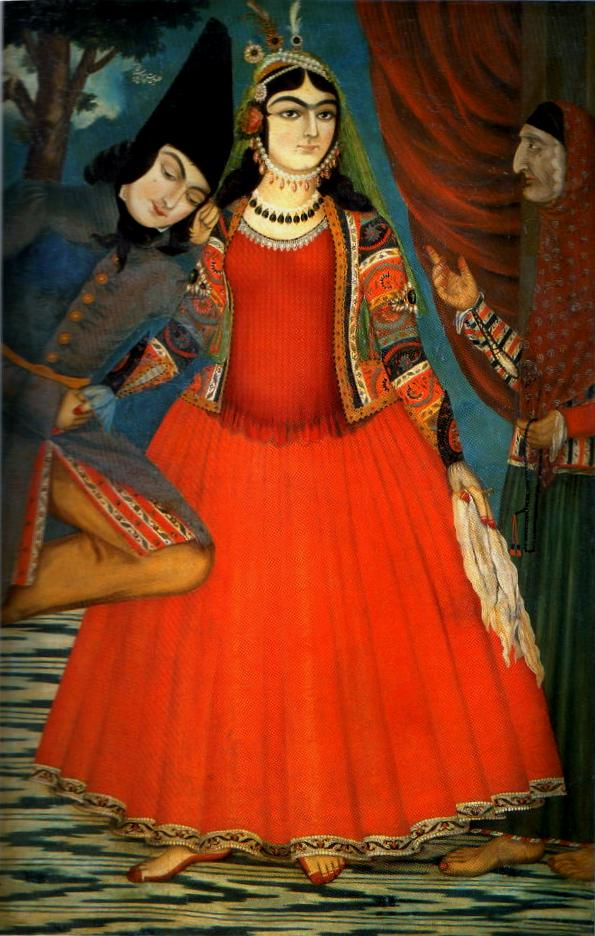
Two young lovers and a hairdresser. Sani al Mulk, 1843, oil painting, Golestan Palace

Mirza Abu'l-Hasan Khan Ghaffari Kashani (Persian: میرزا ابوالحسن‌ خان غفاری کاشانی; 1814–1866) was an Iranian painter, miniature and lacquer artist, and book illustrator. When he became the Chief Court Painter, he also became known as Sani al-Mulk (صنیع‌الملک), meaning "the Crafter of the Kingdom." He was a student of Mihr 'Ali and a court painter in Mohammad Shah Qajar's court. After being dismissed as a court painter, he went to Europe to study, most notably in Italy. When he returned to Iran, he became the Director of Printing and Chief Illustrator for Naser al-Din Shah and earned the separate title Chief Court Painter. He supervised the illustration of a famous One Thousand and One Nights manuscript, which can be viewed today in Tehran in the Golestan Palace Library.

== Family ==
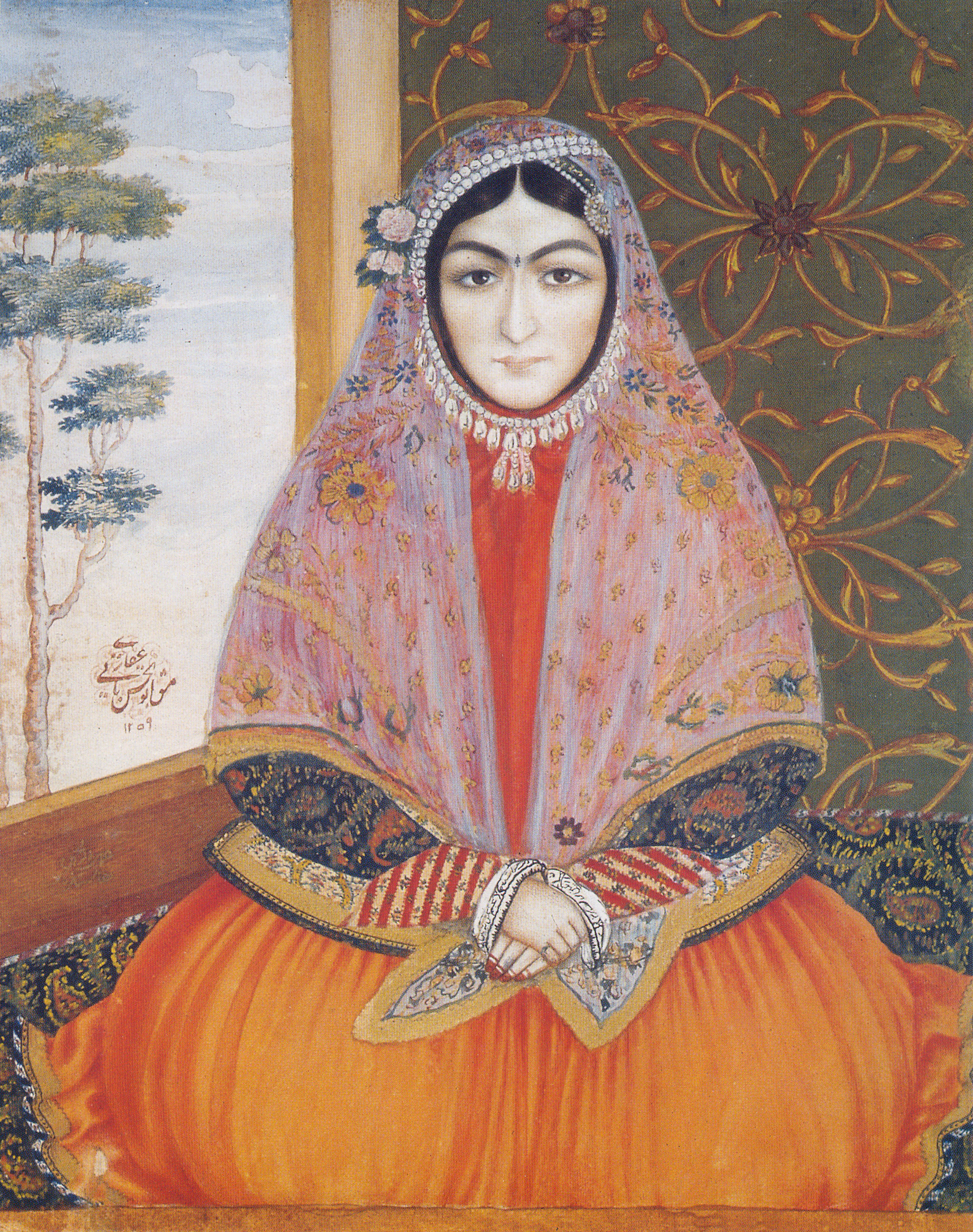
Portrait of Khorshid Khanum Ghaffari, his first cousin once removed, by Sani al Mulk, 1835/35

He was born in Kashan, Iran. He was the uncle of Mohammad Ghaffari (Kamal ol-Molk), who became an acclaimed court painter during the reign of Naser al-Din Shah. He was the oldest son of Mīrzā Moḥammad Ḡaffārī, and great-nephew of Abu'l-Hasan Mostawfi Ghaffari. In total, there were 11 significantly talented painters in his family line.

== Education ==
Scholars agree that he was likely taught by his father Mīrzā Moḥammad Ḡaffārī before becoming a pupil of Mihr ʿAlī. Mihr Ali was a renowned painter and master of Fatḥ Alī Shāh's court. Abu'l-Hasan went to Europe to continue his education sometime between the 1820s and 1830s, although most of the information about his time abroad focuses on his two to three year stay in Italy. There are several possibilities for his motivations to go abroad. It is not clear if he paid his own way or if he was sponsored by the court. Yale professor of Iranian studies Abbas Amanat offers three theories. One of Amanat's theories is that he went to Europe using personal funds due to the state of Iran's financial constraints and changing court politics with the demise of the Āqāsī government. These changes meant that the court commissioned fewer and smaller paintings, making it difficult for a painter to earn a living. Amanat's second theory is predicated on changes in the court order when Mīrzā Taqī Khān became the Shah's tutor and chief of the army. Because the new court order likely included promoting modern artistic culture beyond the court and in the press, Abu'l-Hasan may have been terminated as a court painter and sent to Europe by the government to learn about the art of the press. Amanat's third theory is that he was influenced to go abroad by prominent European artists in Iran at the time, including the Italian-French army engineer officer and watercolor artist Colonel F. Colombari. Some of Abu'l-Hasan's later watercolor portraits and a sketch of the crown prince in 1845 resemble the Colonel's style, suggesting that he had significant influence on him.

While in Europe, he studied mainly Renaissance masters. In 1862, a public announcement of the opening of his art academy suggested that he studied works of Master Raphael, Michelangelo, and Titian. Studying during this era was mainly learning how to recreate the works of earlier artists. The copies he created indicate that he spent time in Rome, the Vatican and Florence, and Venice. The art academy that he opened followed the European model of copying previous works, which leads scholars to believe that he received a classical training at an art academy, likely in Florence.

Abbas Amanat illuminates the possibility that Abu'l-Hasan witnessed Risorgimento, an Italian attempt at unification, firsthand. This could have included the arrival of revolutionary forces led by Giuseppe Garibaldi in Rome (1882) or the proclamation of the Roman Republic (1849). Two months later, Amanat says Abu'l-Hasan may have witnessed the collapse of the Roman Republic when French troops took control of Rome. Amanat points out that these events were similar to events at home in Iran, such as whenʿAlī Muḥammad challenged the Shiite mujtahids and his troops were crushed in seven months. Furthermore, he argues that these events demonstrated the power of the press and that Abu'l-Hasan would harness the same power as director of the press later in his life. He returned to Iran in 1850. He continued to follow the Persian pictorial tradition, although according to art historian and curator Donna Stein, his style "is indicative of a modern character, unlike more stylized traditional Persian painting."

== Career ==
Abu'l-Hasan first became a Qajar court painter near the end of Mohammad Shah Qajar’s reign (r. 1834–1848). His work caught the attention of the subsequent ruler, Naser al-Din Shah, who made him chief court painter and gave him the title Sani al Molk, meaning "Craftsman or Painter of the Kingdom" or Artisan of the Kingdom According to Stanislaus State professor Staci Gem Scheiwiller, he distinguished himself with "lifelike portraits of dignitaries, which convey a profound psychological intensity, such as in his work Prince Ardishir Mirza, Governor of Tehran." He is also well-known for his skillful and detailed depictions of hands, feet and facial expressions.

In 1861, he was appointed as Director of Printing and Chief Illustrator by Naser al-Din Shah, who said that Abu'l-Hasan earned this new title to his superior lithographic abilities. His main responsibility was to edit the weekly court newspaper, called the Ruznameh-ye Dowlat-e ʿAliyeh-ye Iran (The newspaper of the great government of Iran). The newspaper was printed using a lithographic process. It contained representations of notable events, portraits of people from the royal palace, prints of inner spaces in the palace, and showcased Naser al-Din Shah's daily activities. Bringing these images to the public allowed Naser-al Din Shah to establish more of a relationship with his subjects. Sani al Molk mostly used oil painting and watercolor to create the realistic images. According to scholar Staci Scheiwiller, lithography can be in Arabic is "basma tasvir," which also means "painting after printed picture." The term suggests that Persian artists learned to reproduce photography with painting.

Around 1862, Naser al-Din Shah initiated a Royal Art School. As part of the school, Abu'l-Hasan taught a workshop in lithographic printing. The main goal of this workshop was to teach more students to bring images to the public, but the workshop also reproduced the work of famous European artists and sold them for a commission.

=== One Thousand and One Nights ===
In 1853, Naser al-Din Shah commissioned Abu'l-Hasan to design and supervise 34 painters in the creation and illustration of the six volume manuscript One Thousand and One Nights, also known as Arabian Nights in European languages. Scholars Mahyar Asadi and Azadeh Amjadi at the University of Fine Arts in Tehran, Iran believe that his work on this manuscript was influenced by previous Iranian painters during the reign of Caliph Noaman. They find many similarities in the depiction of the Caliph's son Zu-olmakan and Naser al-Din Shah. They use semiotics (the study of origins) to discover that both sets of illustrations have very similar detailing in facial features, clothing, hands and feet. Today, the manuscript is preserved in the Golestan Palace in Tehran, Iran. The manuscript contains 1,134 pages and at least three miniatures per page.

== Gallery ==
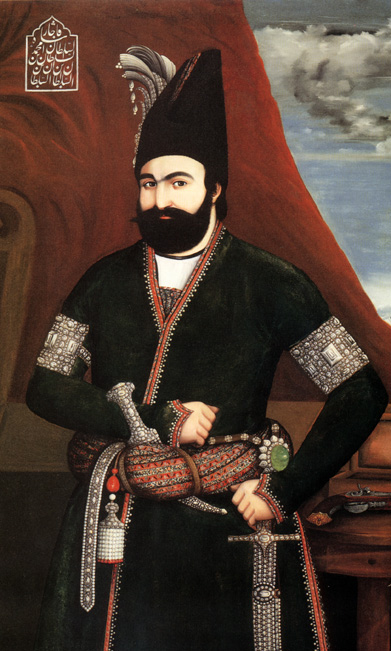
Portrait of Mohammad Shah Qajar, 1841

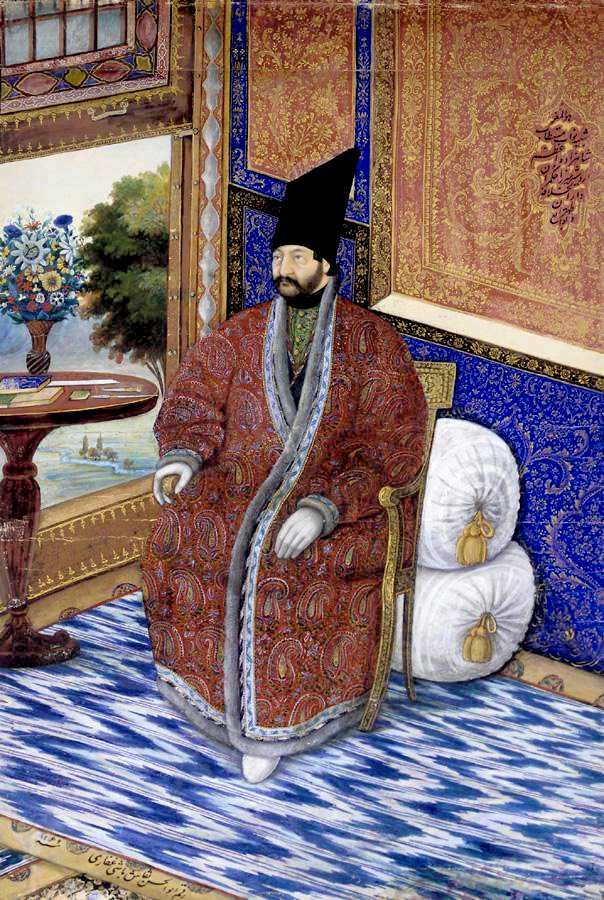
Portrait of Ardashir Mirza, 1853

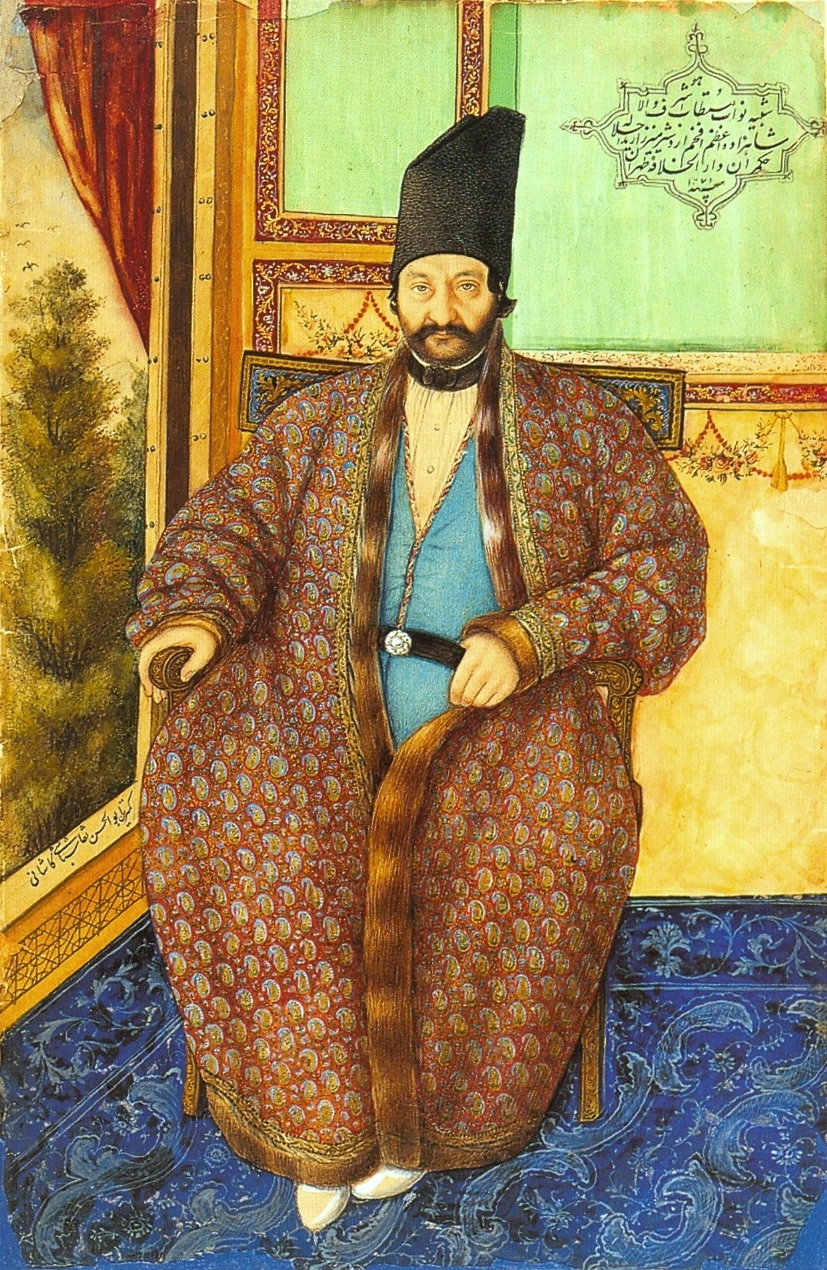
Portrait of Ardashir Mirza, 1854, gouache on paper.

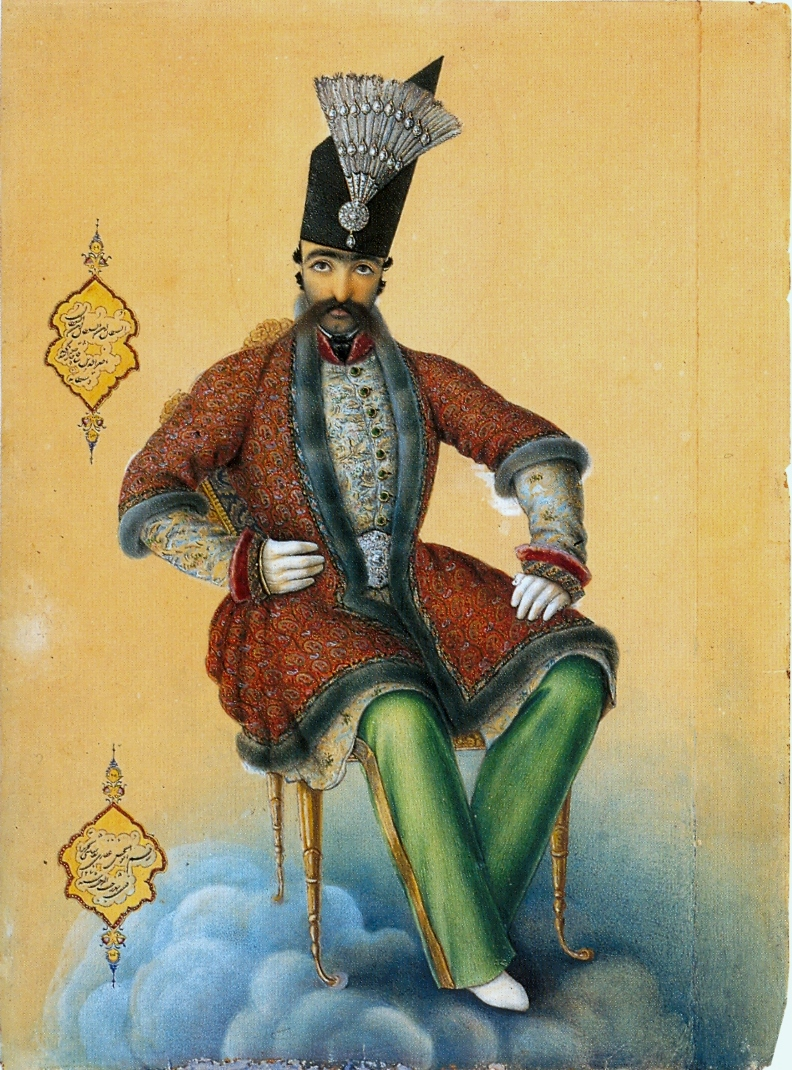
Portrait of Naser al-Din Shah Qajar, 1854, miniature, Louvre

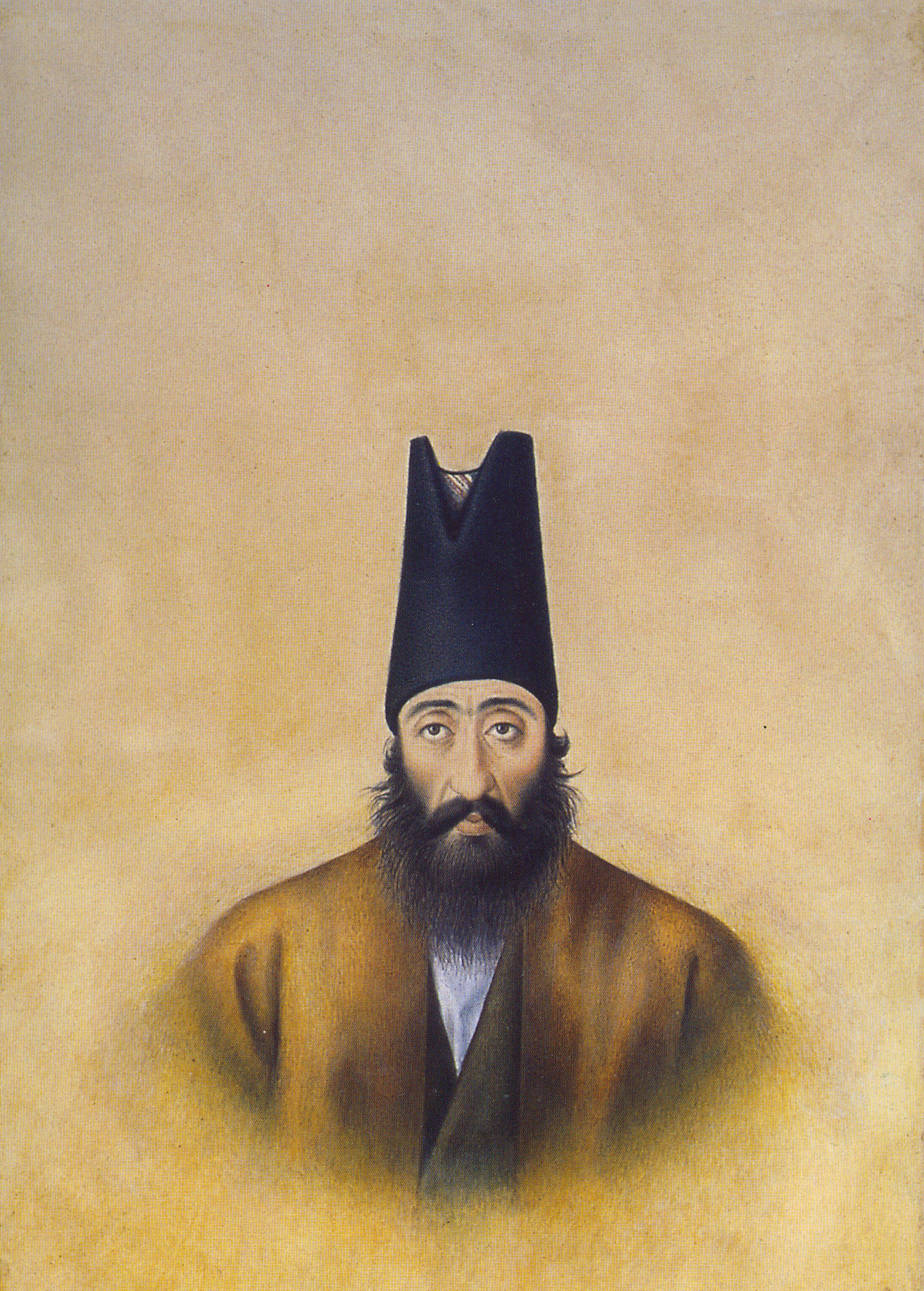
Portrait of Mostofi ol Mamalek, 1860s, miniature, Malek National Museum and Library

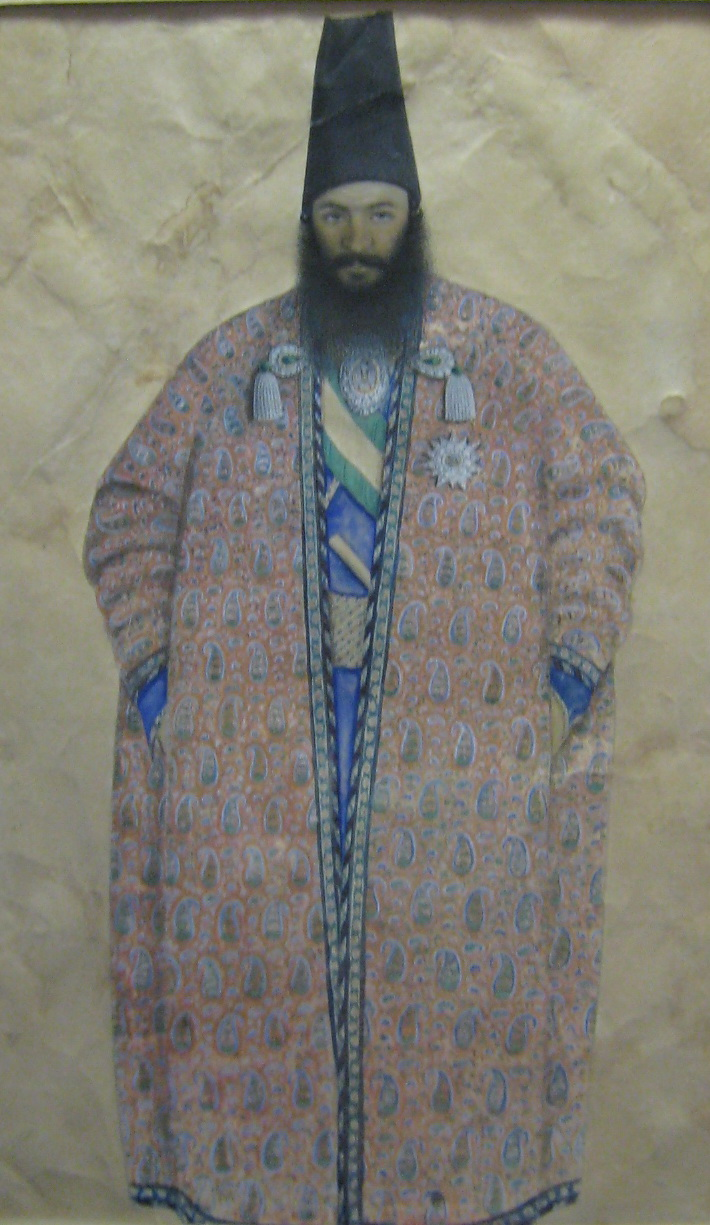
Portrait of a Qajar man

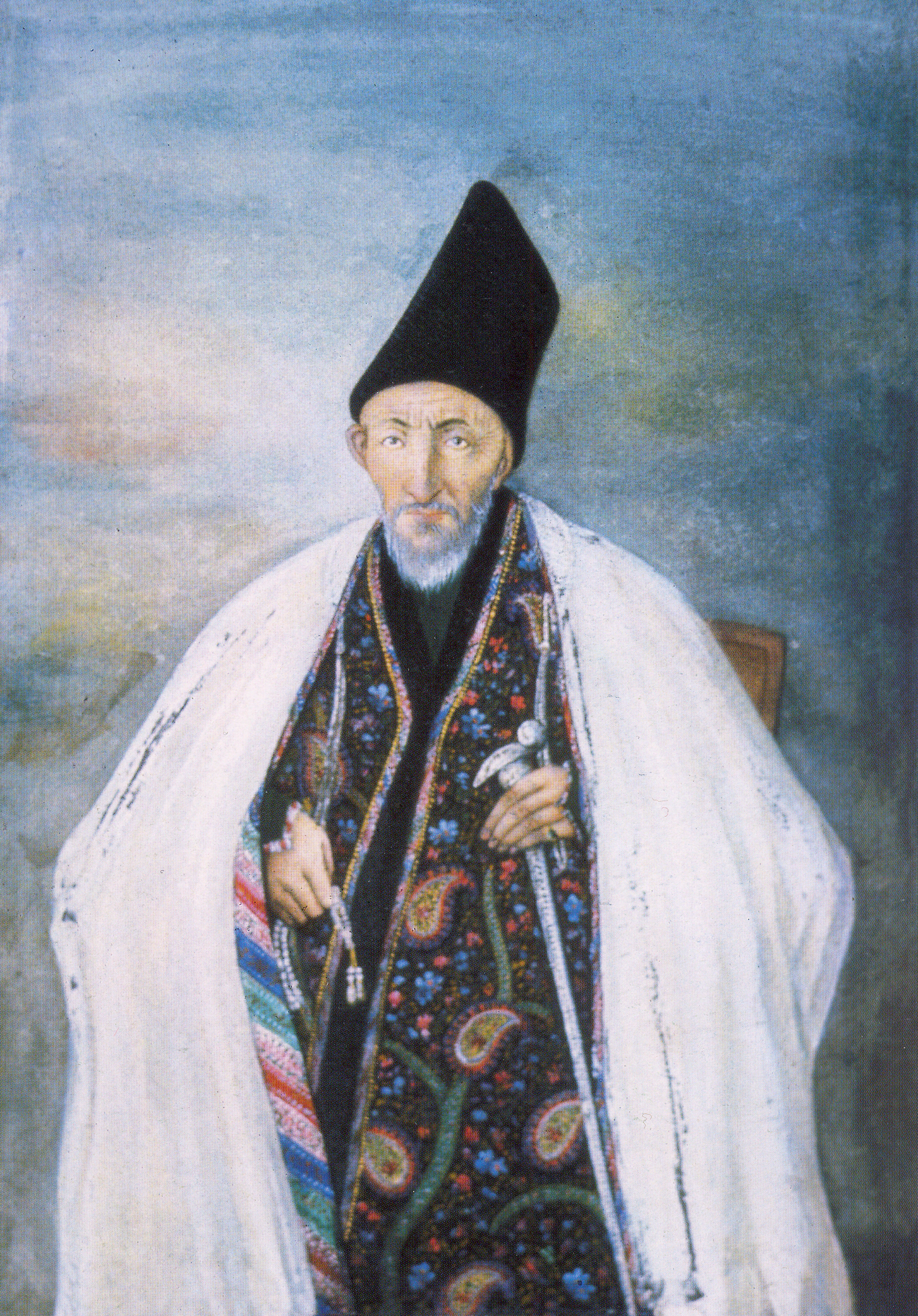
Portrait of Haji Mirza Aqasi, c. 1846

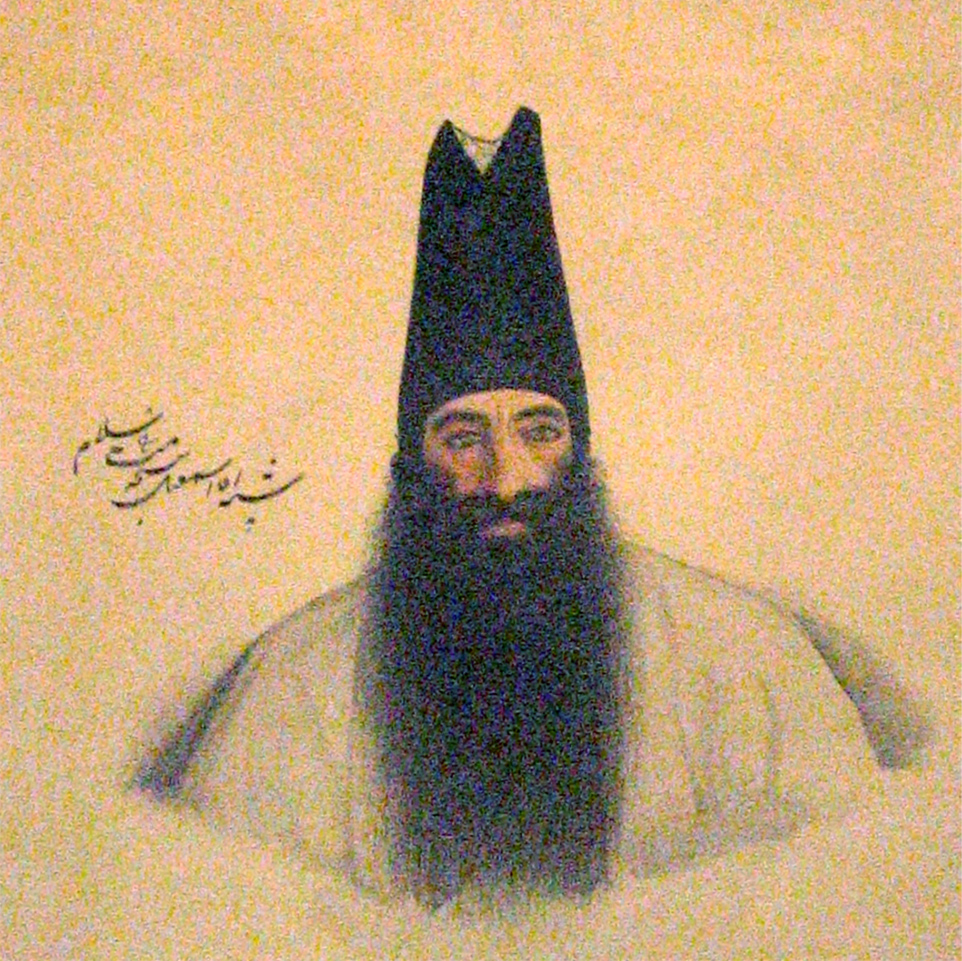
Portrait of Aqa Ismail

=== Illustrations of One Thousand and One Nights ===
Miniature illustrations of a Persian version of One Thousand and One Nights, created by Sani ol Molk and other artists under his supervision. 1853, Golestan Palace library.

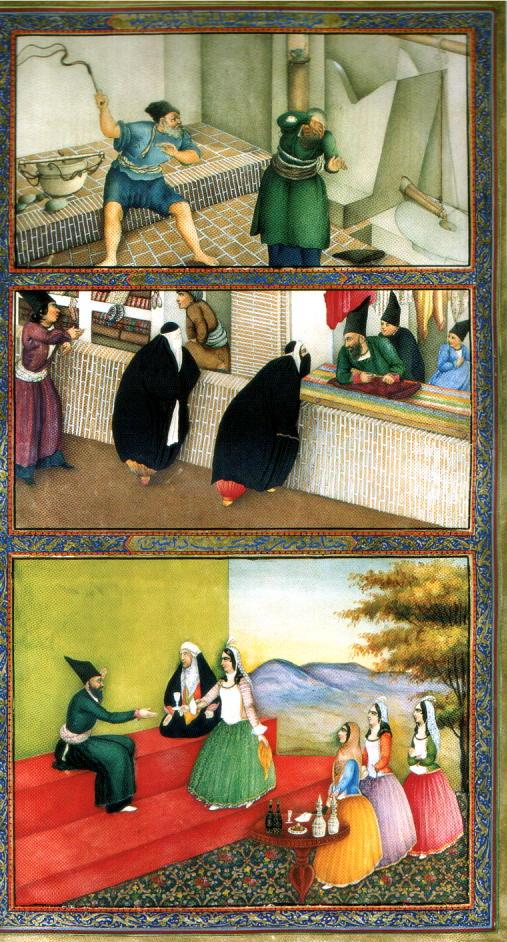

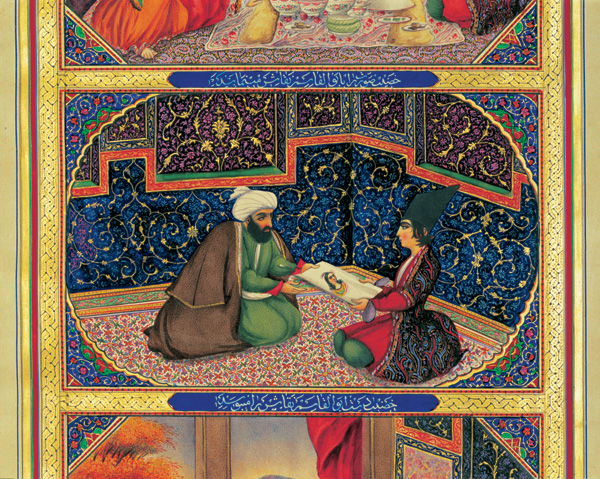

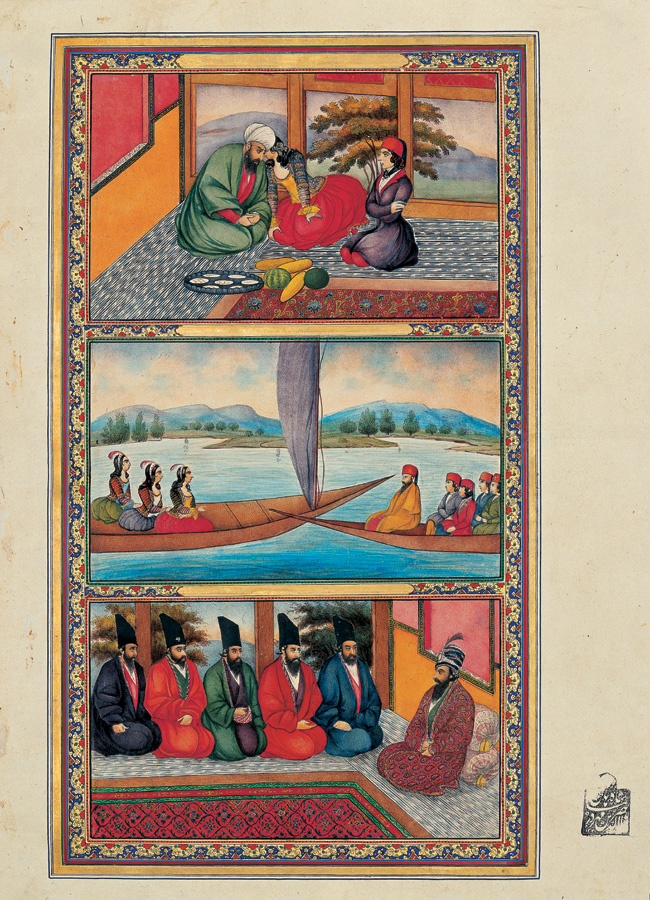

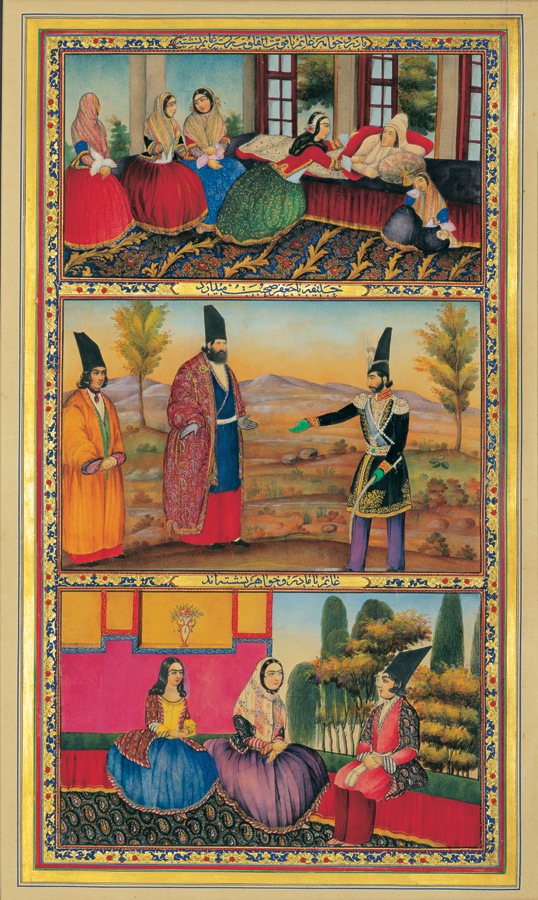

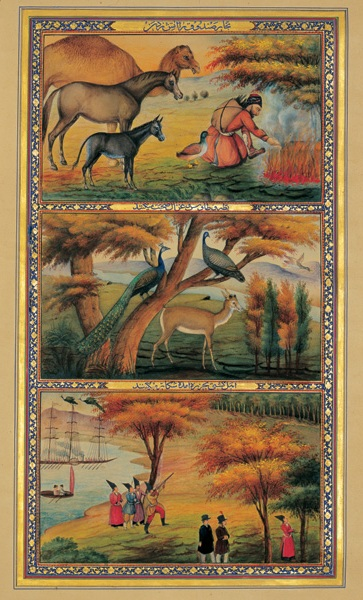

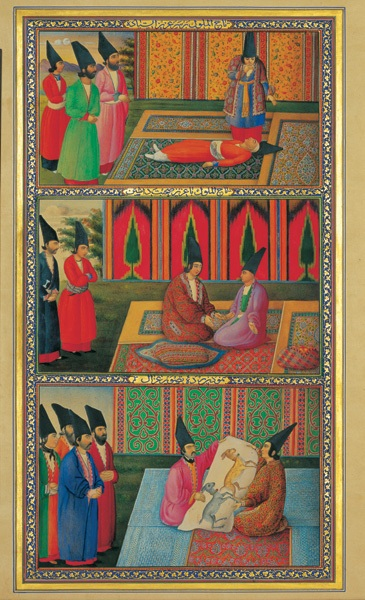

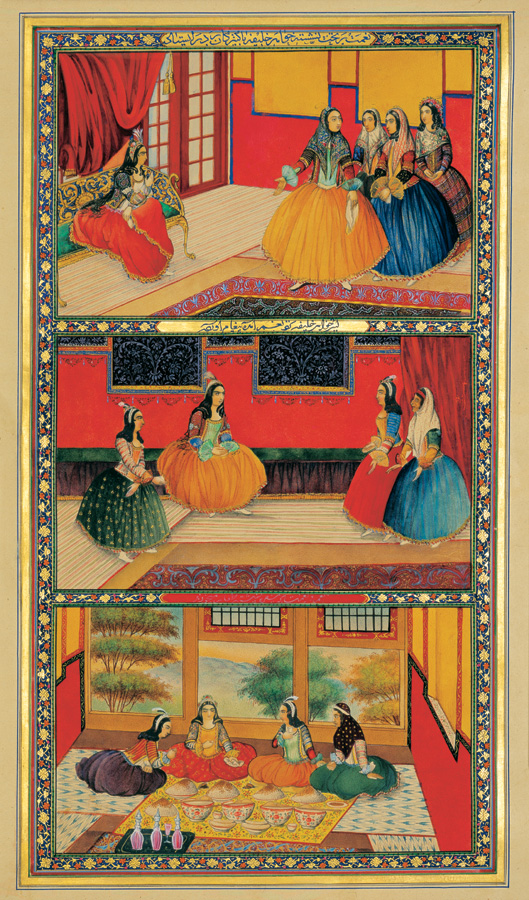

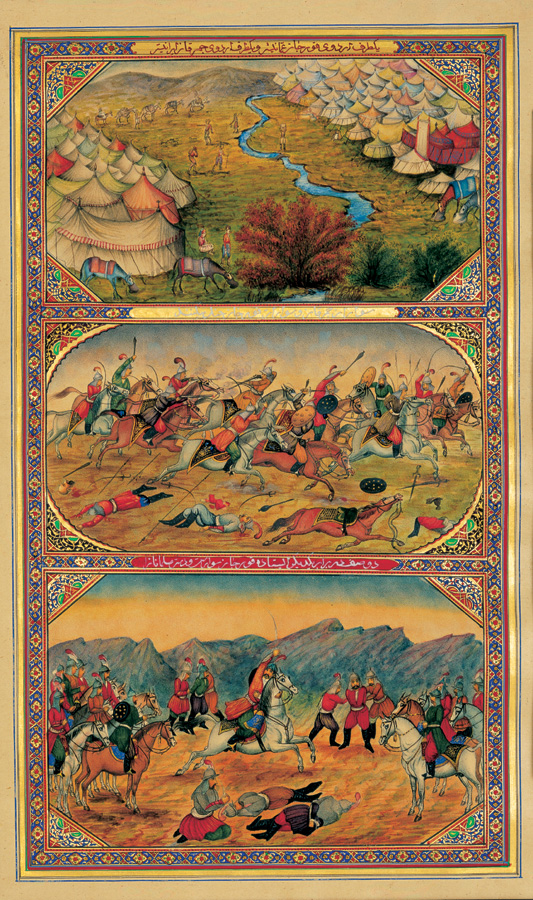

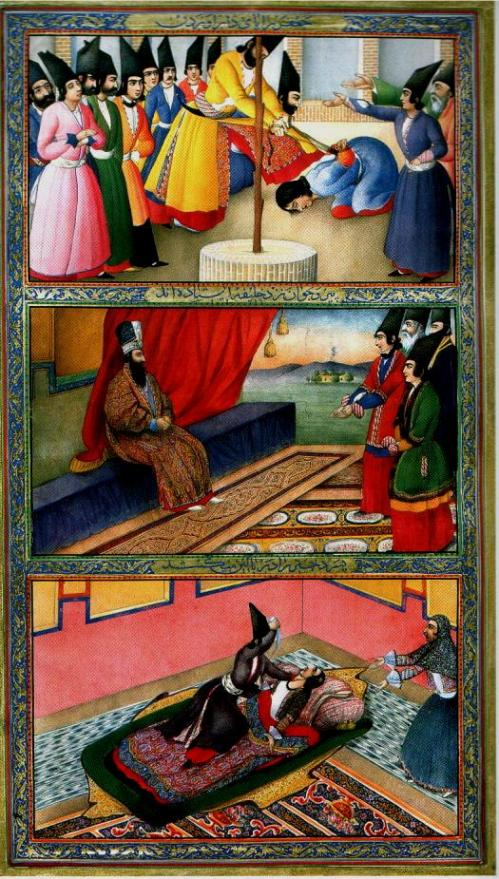

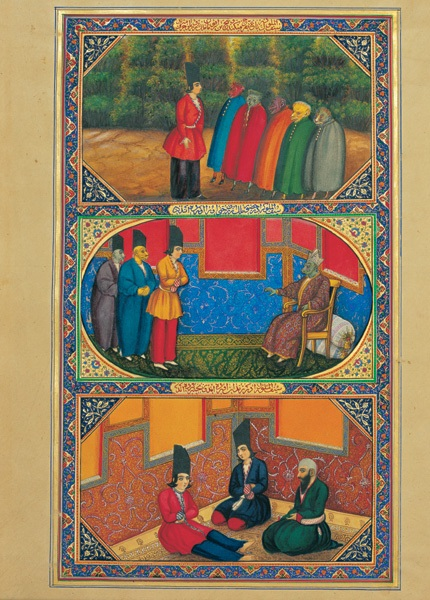
