= Aqa Reza Khan Iqbal os-Saltaneh =

Iranian photographer (1843–1890)

Aqa Reza Khan
- آقا رضا خان
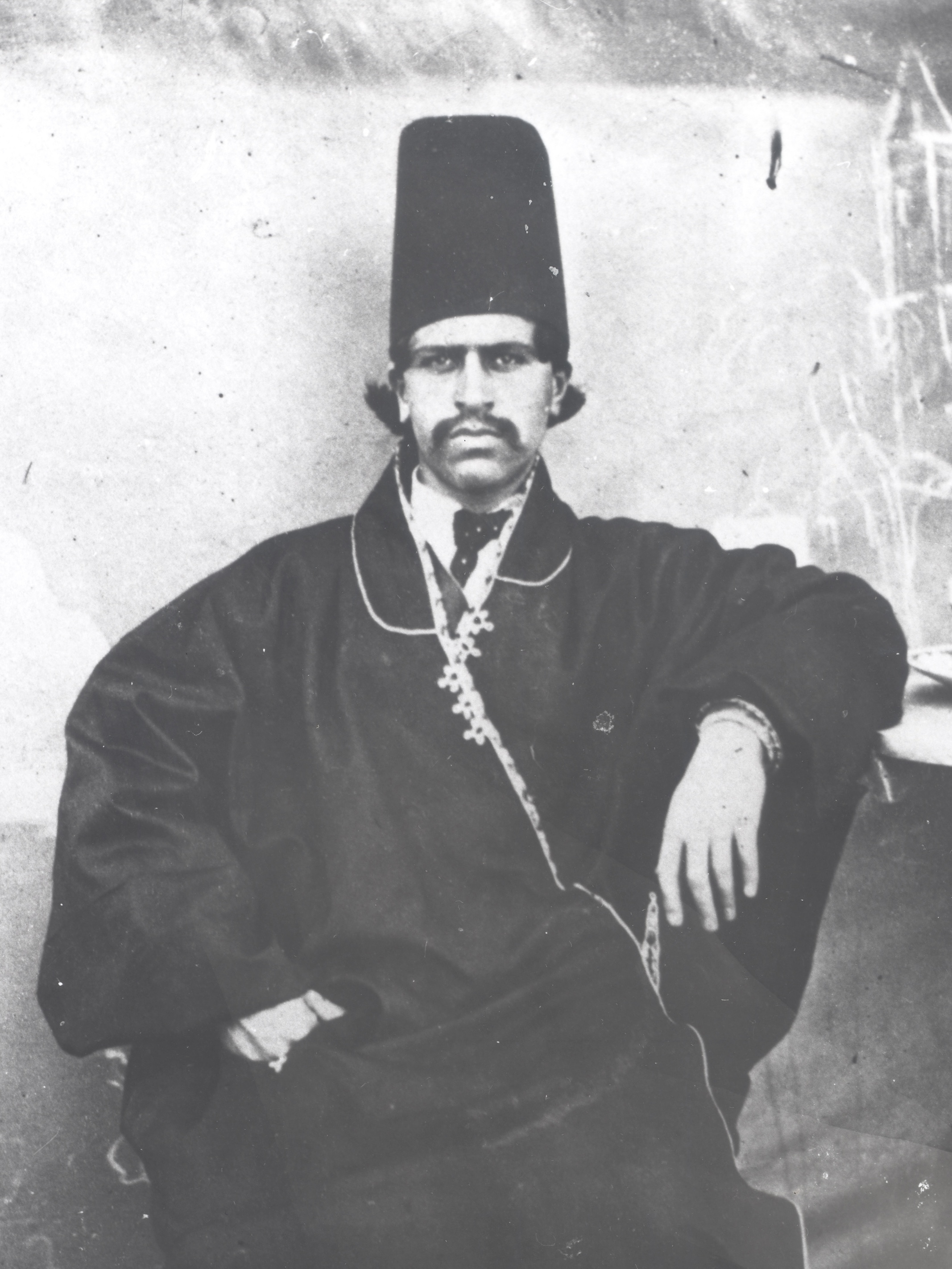
- Photograph of Aqa Reza Akkas-Bashi, Golestan Palace library.
- Born: 1843
- Died: 30 January 1890 (aged 46–47); Shemiran, Iran
- Cause of death: Poisoning with Qajar coffee
- Occupations: Photographer, Statesman, Official
- Era: Qajar
- Notable work: See Gallery
- Title: Ajudan-e Makhsus; Akkas-Bashi; Iqbal os-Saltaneh
- Father: Agha Esmail Jaded ol-Eslam
- Relatives: Mirza Ali-Naqi Khan Hakem ol-Mamalek (brother)

Aqa Reza Khan Iqbal os-Saltaneh (Persian: آقا رضا خان اقبال‌السلطنه; 1843 – 1890), also known by the titles of Ajudan-e Makhsus (Persian: آجودان مخصوص, lit. 'Special Adjutant') and Akkas-Bashi (Persian: عکاس‌باشی, lit. 'Chief photographer'), was the first professional Iranian photographer.

== Biography ==
Aqa Reza Khan was a son of Agha Esmail Jaded ol-Eslam, a prominent court official who served as Chief Attendant of Royal Presence and head of ceremonial arrangements for the Salam ceremonies of Fath-Ali Shah, Mohammad Shah and Naser al-Din Shah. His brother, Mirza Ali-Naqi Khan Hakem ol-Mamalek, was the shah's personal physician.

== Career ==
He learned photography from French photographer Francis Carlhian and specialized in portrait photography. In 1871, Naser al-Din Shah bestowed upon him the title of Akkas-Bashi (Persian: عکاس‌باشی, lit. 'Chief photographer'). In 1885, Aqa Reza was granted the title Iqbal os-Saltaneh. In 1887, in addition to serving as Minister of Arsenal, he was entrusted with deputyship of Fath-Ali Mir, son of Kamran Mirza Nayeb es-Saltaneh, who had been appointed Commander of Artillery despite his young age.

Aqa Reza died on 30 January 1890 at his private garden in Shemiran. Various theories have been proposed concerning his death. Mehdi Bamdad, author of Sharh-e Haal-e Rejaal-e Iran, believed that Aqa Reza had been poisoned with Qajar coffee on order of Naser al-Din Shah.

== Gallery ==
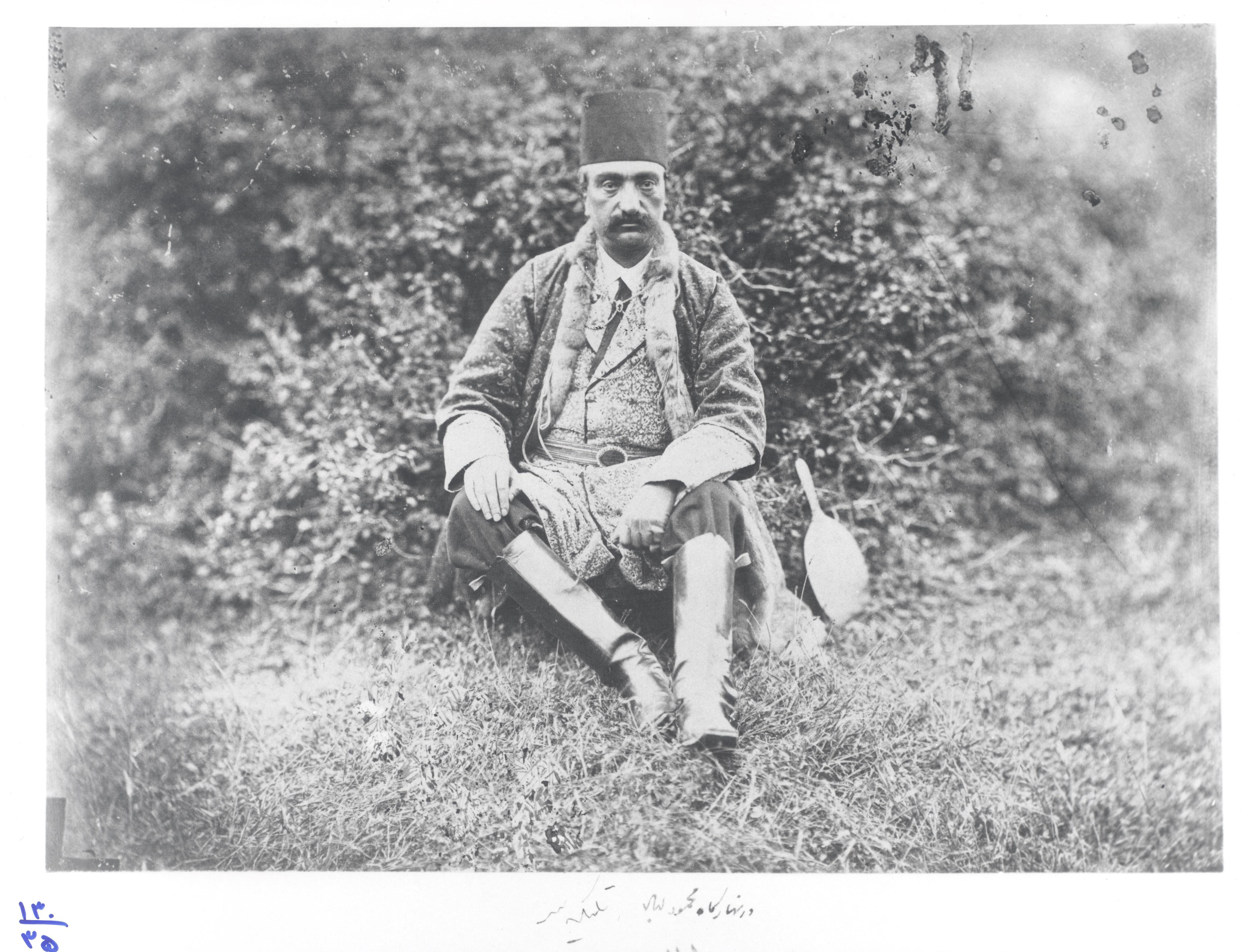
Photograph of Naser al-Din Shah

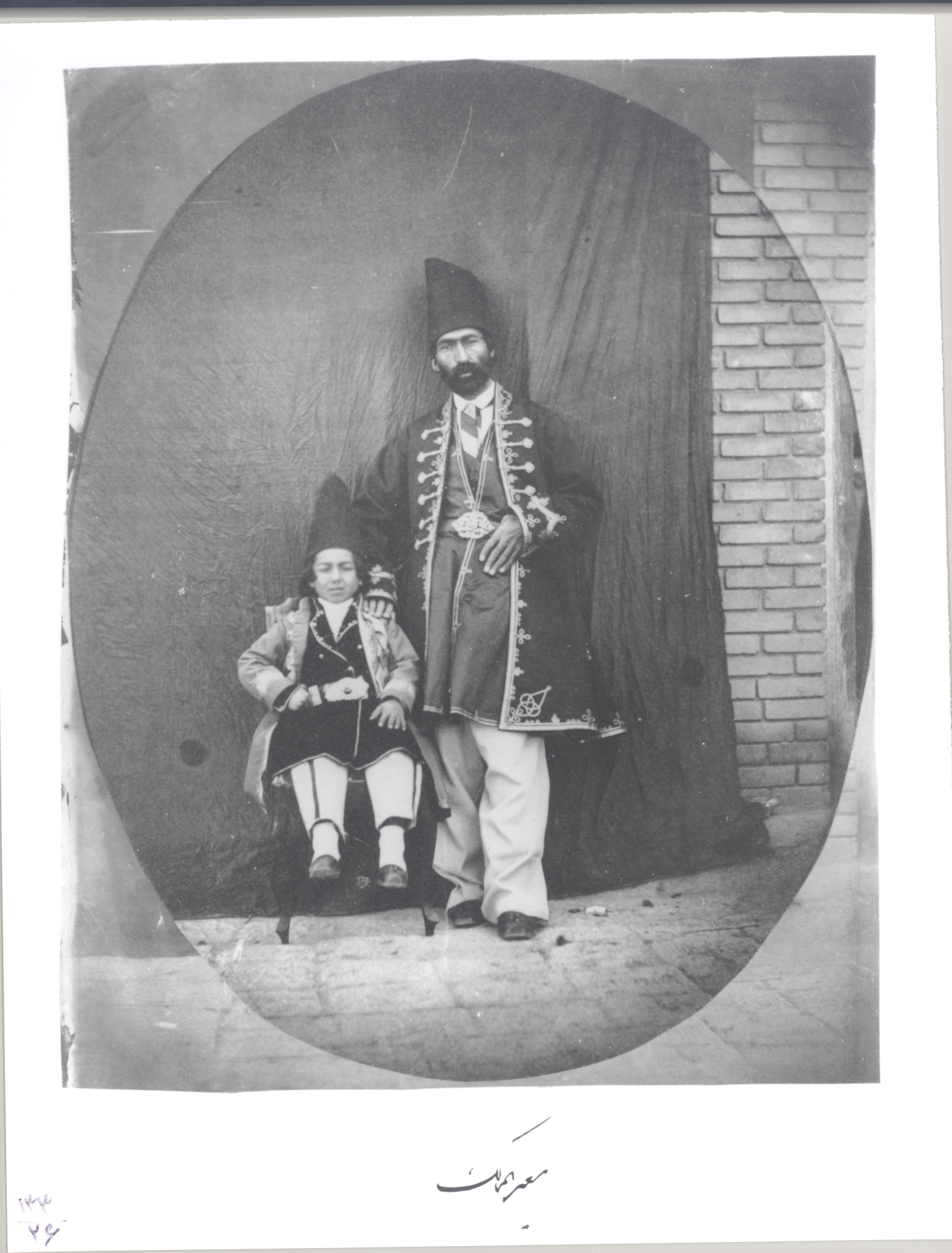
Photograph of Dost Ali Khan Moayyer ol-Mamalek

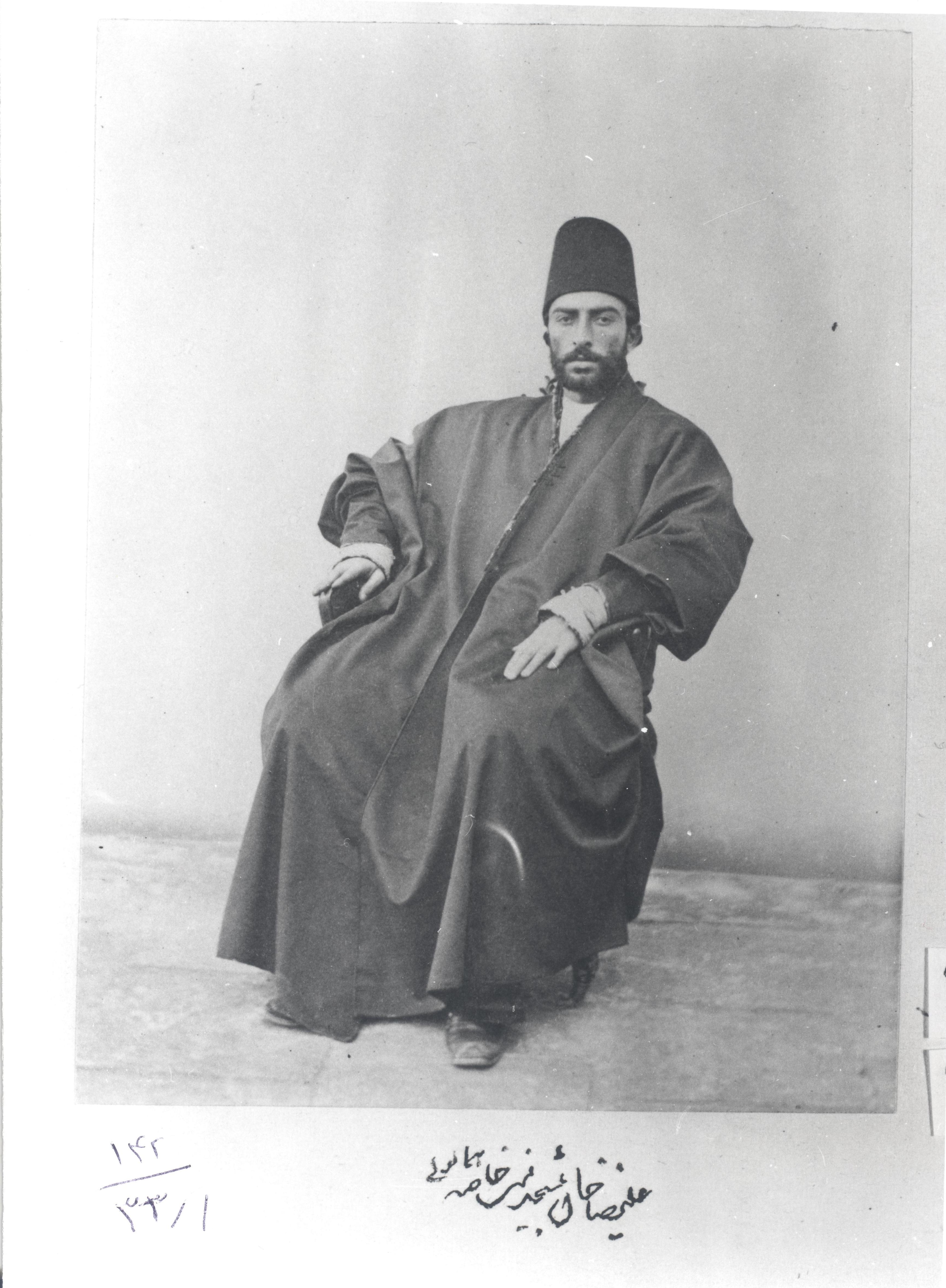
Photograph of Ali Reza Khan Azod-ol-Molk

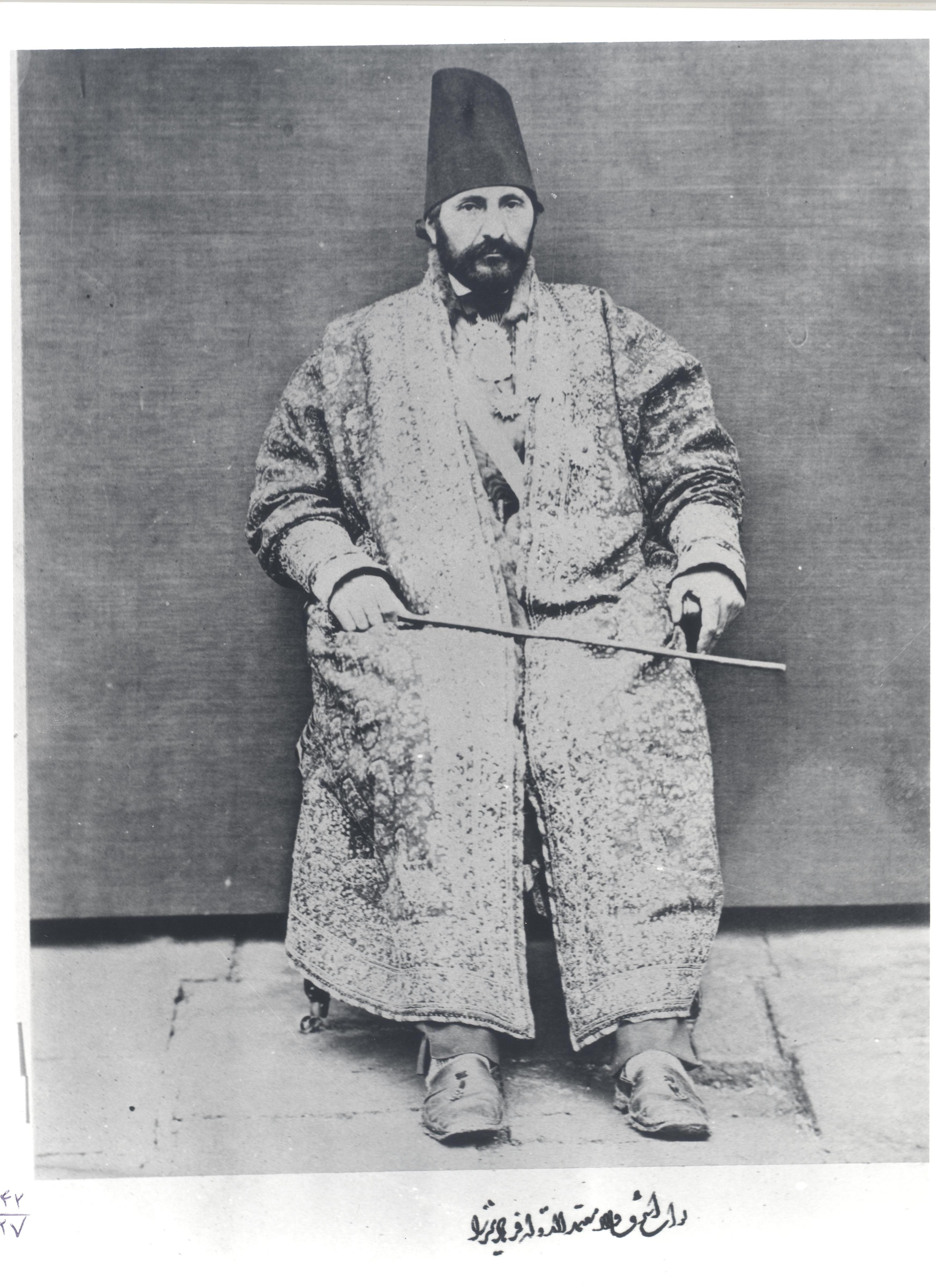
Photograph of Farhad Mirza

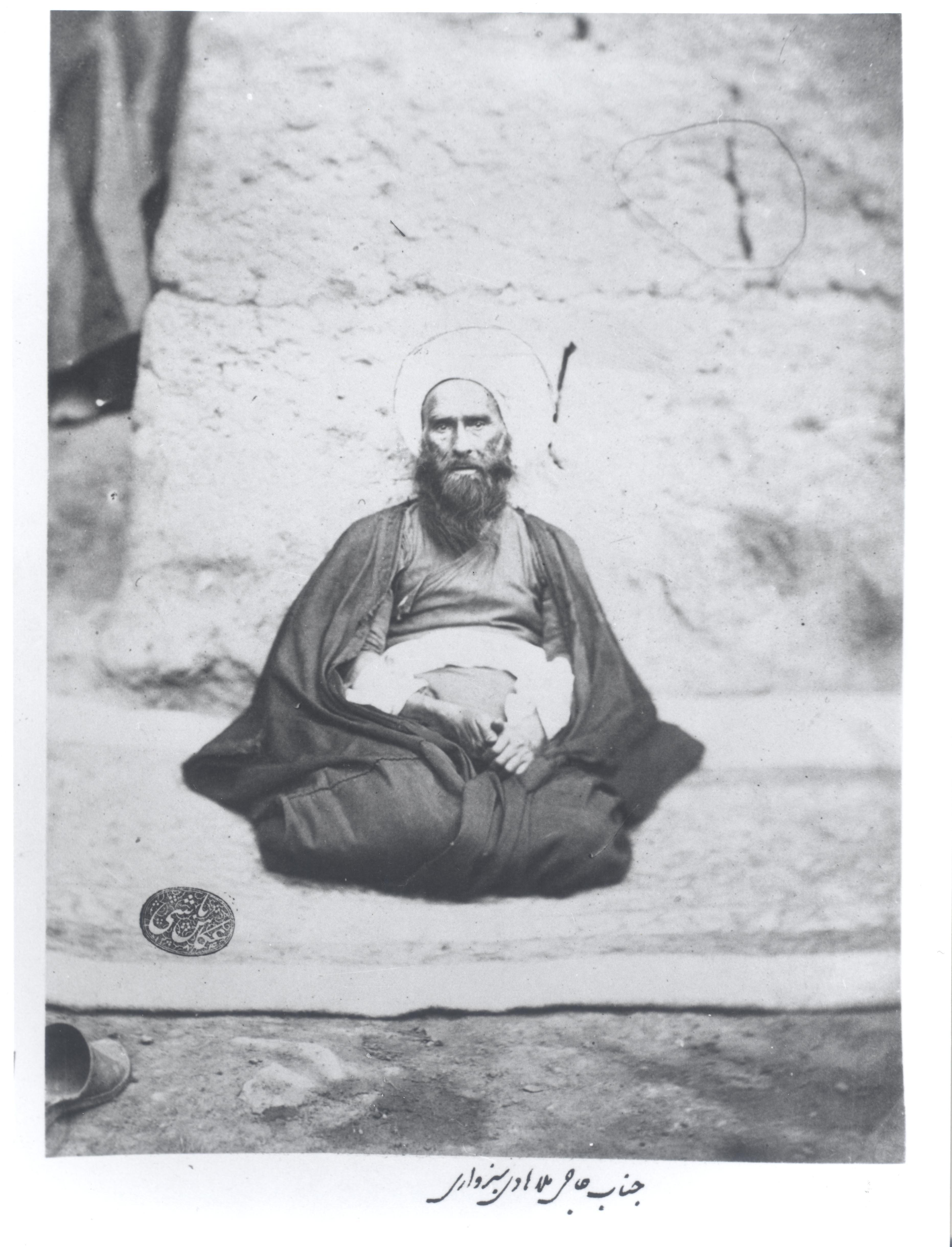
Photograph of Hadi Sabzavari

== Sources ==
- Saadat Nuri, Hossein. "رجال دوره قاجاریه: حاج آقا اسماعیل پیشخدمت‌باشی سلام، آقا رضاخان اقبال‌السلطنه، میرزا علی‌نقی حکیم‌الممالک (بخش سوم)" [Notables of the Qajar Period: Haj Aqa Esmail Pishkhedmat-Bashi Salam, Aqa Reza Khan Eqbal al-Saltaneh, Mirza Ali-Naqi Hakim al-Mamalek]. Notables of the Qajar Period (in Persian). 3.
- Sepehr, Abdolhossein Khan (2007). Navaei, Abdolhossein (ed.). مرآت الوقایع مظفری [Mirror of the Mozaffari Events] (in Persian). Vol. 2. Tehran: Markaz-e Pazhuheshi-ye Mirath-e Maktub. ISBN 9789648700275.
- Gonzales, Carmen P. (2012). Local Portraiture. Leiden: Leiden University Press. ISBN 9789087281564.
- Zoka, Yahya. تاریخ عکاسی و عکاسان پیشگام ایران [History of Photography and the Pioneering Photographers of Iran] (in Persian).
