= Farhang (newspaper) =

Newspaper

Farhang (Persian: فرهنگ, lit. "culture") was the first newspaper to be published, in Persian, in Isfahan during the Qajar era. It was published from 1878/1879 (1296 AH/ 1257/1258 HS) until 1890/1891 (1308 AH/ 1269/1270 HS). It was occasionally published weekly. The newspaper was owned by Mirza Taghikhan Kashani.

== Pictures ==
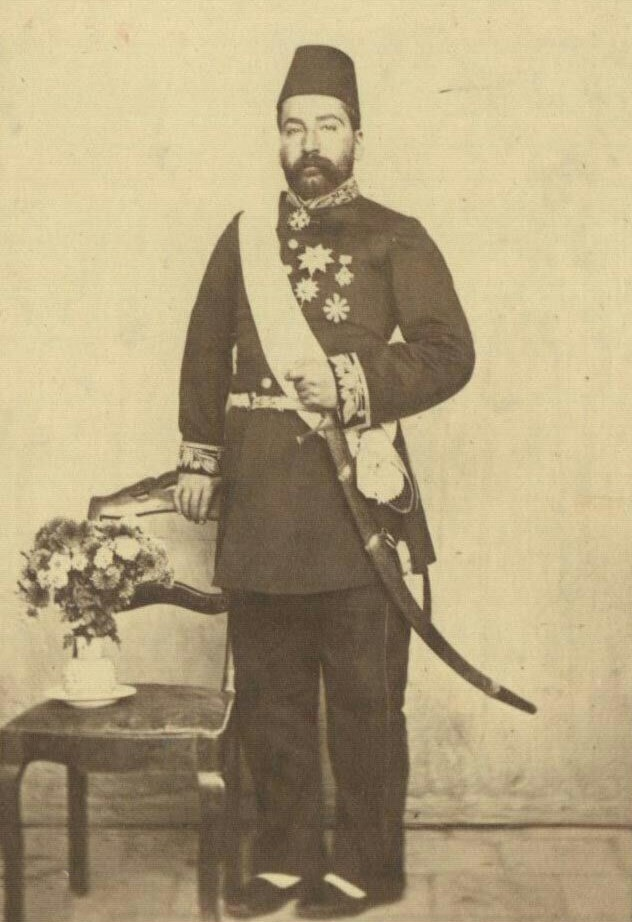
Mirza Taghi Khan Kashani

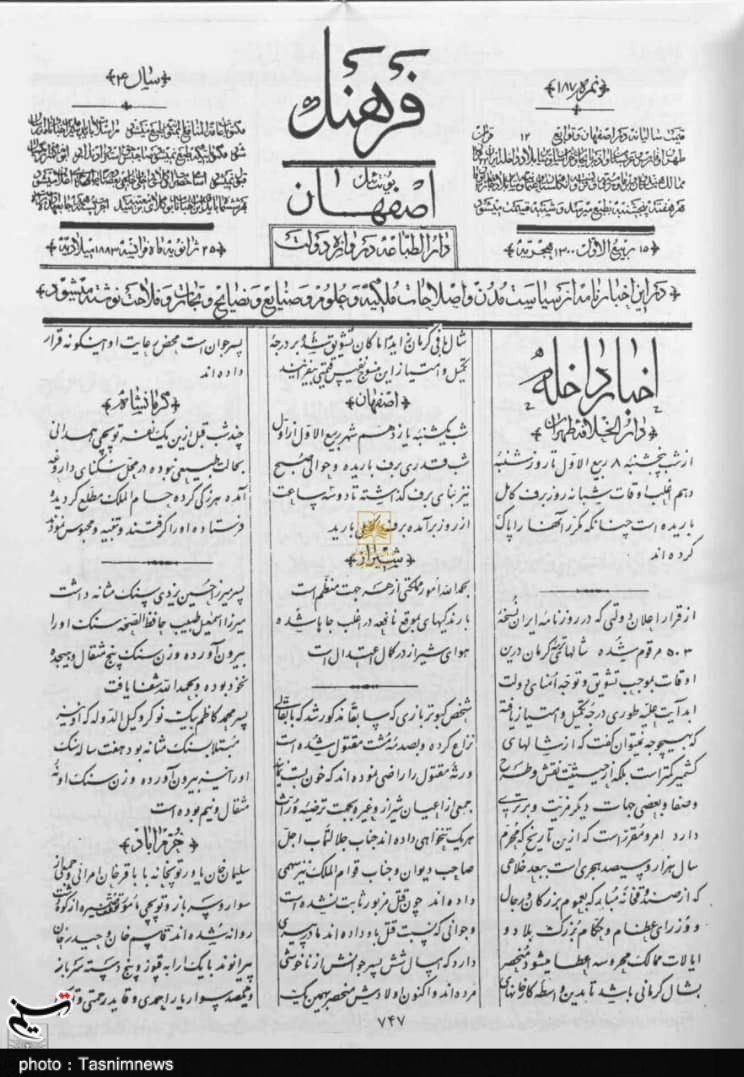
Sample issue of the paper
