= Agha Esmail Jaded ol-Eslam =

Qajar courtier (d. 1874)

Hajji Agha Esmail Jaded ol-Eslam
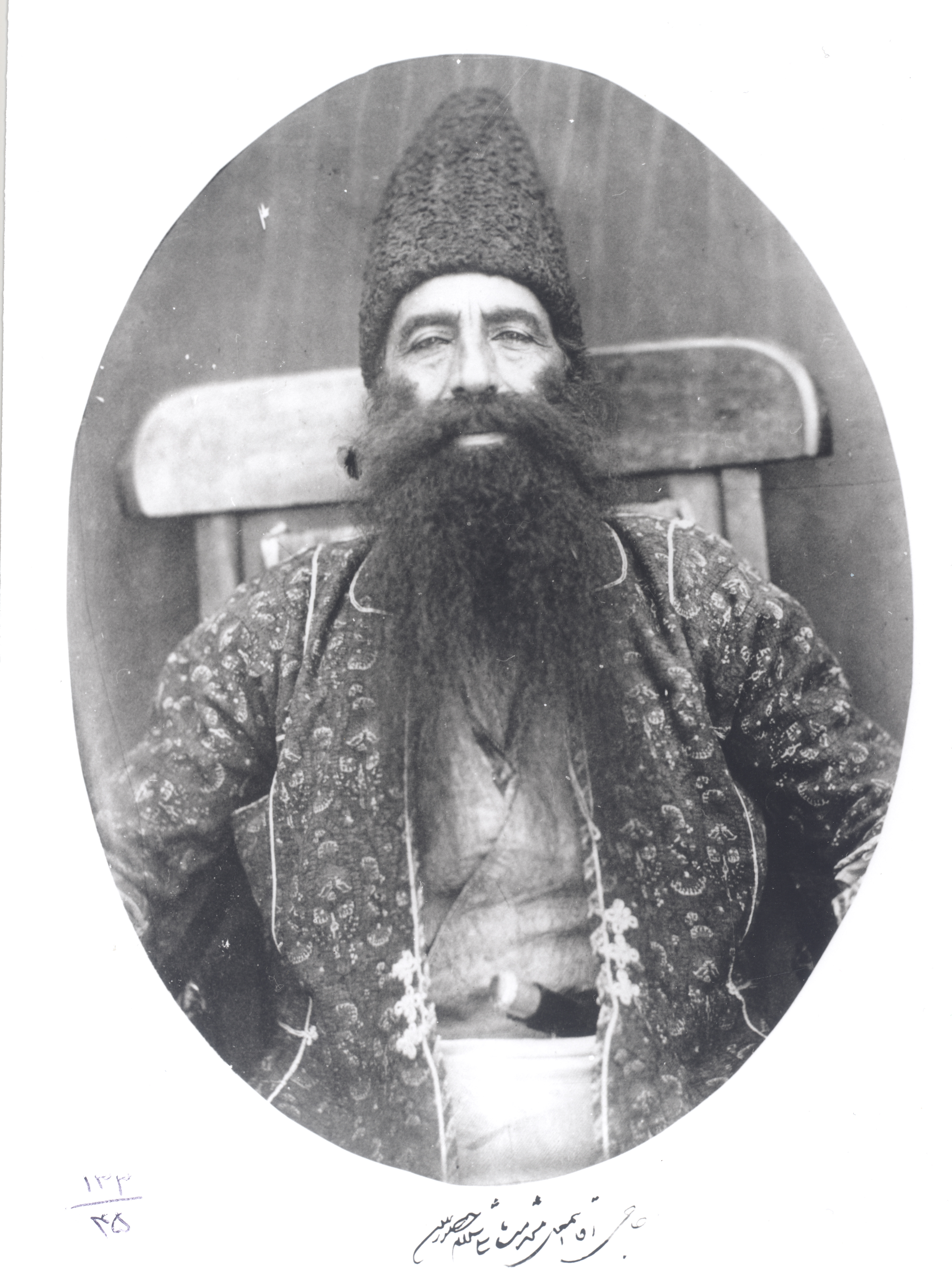
- Photograph of Jaded ol-Eslam

Personal details
- Died: 1874
- Children: Aqa Reza Khan Iqbal os-Saltaneh
- Parent: Molla-Baba Kelami Esfahani (father)

Agha Ismail Jadid ol-Eslam (Persian: آقا اسماعیل جدیدالاسلام; d. 1874) was a Qajar era courtier who served under Fath-Ali Shah, Mohammad Shah and Naser al-Din Shah.

== Biography ==
His father, Molla-Baba Kelami Esfahani, was an Iranian Jew from Isfahan. After entering the court of Fath-Ali Shah and converting to Islam, Agha Ismail became known as Jaded ol-Eslam (Persian: جدیدالاسلام, lit. 'New Muslim'). Under Fath-Ali Shah, Agha Esmail became Chief of ceremonies of Salaam ceremony. During the ceremony, he would stand beside the shah's throne with an ornamented Hookah and hand its pipe to the shah, who would occasionally smoke it.

In 1826, during the rebellion of Abd ol-Reza Khan Yazdi, Aqa Esmail was charged with recovering property that Abd ol-Reza Khan had forcibly seized from Mohammad Vali Mirza. He subsequently accompanied Hasan Ali Mirza Shoja ol-Saltaneh on his expedition to Yazd.

== Sources ==
- Mowlana al-Borujerdi, Gholam-Reza (1974). تاریخ بروجرد [History of Borujerd] (in Persian). Vol. 1. Ketabkhaneh-ye Sadr.
- Navaei, Abdolhossein (2006). ایران و جهان [Iran and the World] (in Persian). Tehran: Moasseseh-ye Nashr-e Homa.
- Saadat Nuri, Hossein. "رجال دوره قاجاریه: حاج آقا اسماعیل پیشخدمت‌باشی سلام، آقا رضاخان اقبال‌السلطنه، میرزا علی‌نقی حکیم‌الممالک (بخش سوم)" [Notables of the Qajar Period: Haj Aqa Esmail Pishkhedmat-Bashi Salam, Aqa Reza Khan Eqbal al-Saltaneh, Mirza Ali-Naqi Hakim al-Mamalek]. Notables of the Qajar Period (in Persian). 3.
